= Museum van Bommel van Dam =

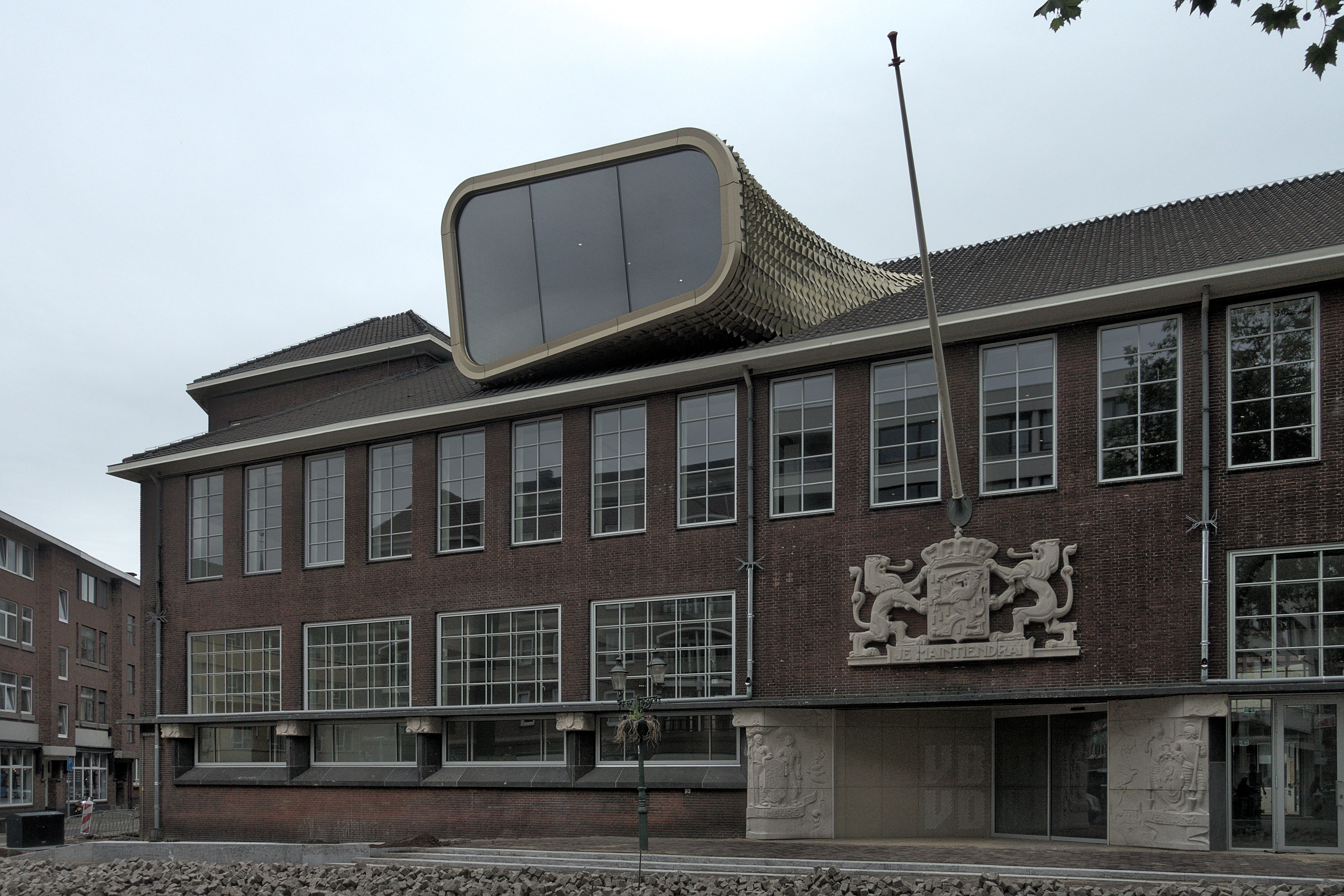
- Museum van Bommel van Dam in 2010
- Established: 1971
- Location: Deken van Oppensingel 6 Venlo, Netherlands
- Coordinates: 51°22′4.8″N 6°10′23.88″E
- Type: Art museum
- Website: www.vanbommelvandam.nl

Museum van Bommel van Dam is a Dutch museum of modern art in Venlo in the southeast Netherlands. The museum belongs to the German/Dutch cooperation Crossart, a partnership between 7 German museums in Westfalen and 4 Dutch museums in Gelderland and Limburg. Exhibitions are held of paintings or drawings, sculpture or photography.

The museum was founded by the couple Maarten and Reina van Bommel-van Dam, who started collecting modern art after the Second World War. Maarten van Bommel was a banker and artlover. In 1969, the house in Amsterdam, belonging to the couple became too small. For this reason they decided to donate the entire collection of about 1,200 paintings, drawings, etchings and lithographs to the Municipality of Venlo, under one condition, which consisted of the creation of a museum in a building connected to a private house, where the couple could live. This museum named after them was opened in 1971.

It shows the artworks that pleased them and they did not try to concentrate in one direction or the other. Typical for the collection is the personal liking of an object or an interest in its material, a certain coloring or in its provenance. For instance they often collected ethnological art. But it could very well be that their eye fell on an abstract canvas of Kees van Bohemen or a woodcut of Hokusai.

They were the first private collectors to buy work from local artists from Limburg like Ger Lataster and Aad de Haas. In the 1950s and 1960s works of Melle, Armando, Edgar Fernhout and Jan Schoonhoven were added; the art of Shinkichi Tajiri, Karel Appel, Gerrit Benner, Eugène Brands, Constant Nieuwenhuys, Guillaume Cornelis van Beverloo, Jaap Nanninga, Lucebert, Anton Rooskens en Theo Wolvekamp stand out by the fact that these artworks represent early periods. The same can be said about Rudi Bierman, Herbert Fiedler en Arie Kater; Bram Bogart, Wim de Haan, Anton Heyboer en Jaap Wagemaker. Later acquisitions of the CoBrA movement were made, as well as of informal art or material art. Maarten van Bommel died in 1991. His wife Reina van Dam, born in Voorthuizen on 31 December 1910, died on 29 July 2008 at the age of 97.
