= Freddy Flores Knistoff =

Chilean painter and poet (born 1948)

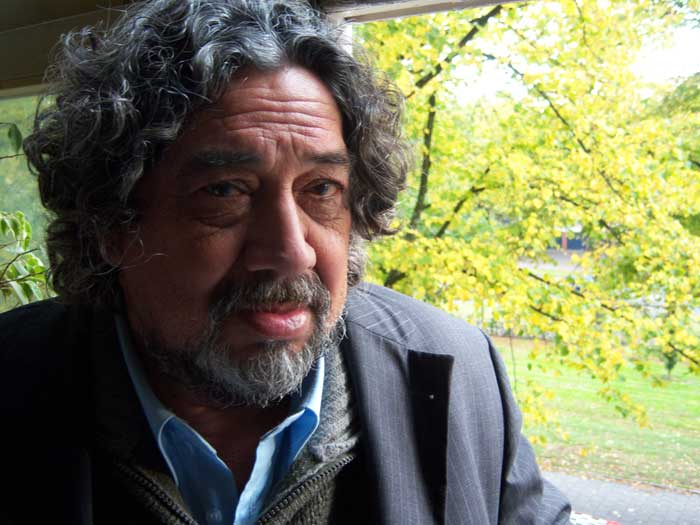
- Flores Knistoff in 2009
- Born: 10 October 1948 (age 78); Viña del Mar, Chile
- Education: Federico Santa María Technical University
- Known for: Painting, poetry
- Movement: CoBrA, FLUXUS, PHASES

Freddy Flores Knistoff is a painter and poet born in Viña del Mar, Chile in 1948. He has lived in Amsterdam since 1985.

Flores Knistoff is still active in both painting and producing artist's books. He also composes experimental poetry and since 1993 has published with Hybriden-Verlag of Berlin directed by Hartmut Andryczuk. He is strongly connected to the international movement FLUXUS.

In recent years, he has exhibited in Brussels (2007), London (2012), New York City (2008 and 2012), Pennsylvania (2012) and Oxford (2014).

He founded the Collective Automatic Painting of Amsterdam in 1991 and through this movement influenced other artists in the use of automatic painting. Flores Knistoff is also an active member of the Phases movement that coalesced around Édouard Jaguer and involved Roberto Matta.

== Exhibitions ==
He has exhibited alongside the following artists:

- 1993: Cobra exhibition Museum Amstelle, Amstelveen, Amsterdam, the Netherlands

Catalogue Cobra 1948-1951 collection J Karel van Stuijvenberg: Karel Appel, Asger Jorn, Jean Michel Atlan, Constant Nieuwenhuis, Jacques Doucet, Lucebert, Carl-Henning Pedersen, Karl Otto Götz

- 1993: Latino América y el Surrealismo, Bochum Museum, Germany

with Rufino Tamayo, Wifredo Lam, Wolfgang Paalen, André Masson, Eugenio Granell, Roberto Matta, Hervé Télémaque

- 1994: Museum of Modern Art, Zielona Góra, Poland

with Karl Otto Götz, Eugenio Granell, Edouard Jaguer, Conroy Maddox, Jacques Lacomblez, Yo Yoshitome

- 1994: Phases, Brittany, France

with Enrico Baj, Edouard Jaguer, Otto Gotz, Pierre Alechinsky, Christian Dotremont

- 1997: Phases, São Paulo, Brazil

with Jef Golyscheff, Flavio Ciro, Victor Chab, Yo Yoshitome, New CoBra Amsterdam

- 1998: Hans und Lote Lesen, Hannover Germany

with Hartmut Andryczuk, Gerhild Ebel, Jurgen O. Olbrich, Emmet Willians, Pierre Garnier, Ann Noel

- 1999: KVP II Parasiten, Hannover, Germany

with Hartmut Andryczuk, Dietmar Becker, Gerhild Ebel, Pierre Garnier, Emmet Willians, Ottfried Zielke, Wolf Rosenthal

- 2000: Phases, Arras, France

with Pierre Alechinsky, Enrico Baj, Raoul Hausmann, Paul Jenkins, Konrad Klapheck, Carl-Henning Pedersen, Carl Buchheister

- 2005: Phases, Santiago, Chile

with Roberto Matta, Wifredo Lam, Édouard Jaguer, Enrico Baj, Pierre Alechinsky, Sergio d'Angelo, Victor Brauner
