= Ans Wortel =

Dutch painter, poet and writer

- Born: Anna Maria Wortel; 18 October 1929; Alkmaar, Netherlands
- Died: 4 December 1996 (aged 67); Hilvarenbeek, Netherlands
- Known for: Painting, drawing, printmaking, poetry, writing, sculpting, glass art
- Awards: First prize at the biennale of Paris in 1963

Ans (Anna Maria) Wortel (18 October 1929, in Alkmaar, Netherlands – 4 December 1996, in Hilvarenbeek, Netherlands) was a Dutch painter, poet and writer. She made gouaches and oil paintings, aquarelles, drawings, collages, lithographs, etchings, sculptures and glass sculptures. She was an autodidact and won the first prize at the biennale of Paris in 1963. She was one of the leading female artists of postwar Dutch modern art. There are some 50 books with contributions from or about Wortel.

== Painting style ==
Wortel's work is strongly autobiographical. Her experiences as a girl, woman, mother and as an artist were the main source of her inspiration. Common themes are human emotions, love, relationships, mother/child relations and social criticism.

Until the late 1950s there was a search for a personal style. Artwork from that time varies and shows characteristics of different artists, such as Katsushika Hokusai, Willem de Kooning, Marc Chagall, Pablo Picasso, Wifredo Lam and Karel Appel. In the late 1950s her artistic style eventually flows into her very own style which is best described as abstract figurative art. It often consists of naked woman, man or child figures, sometimes recognizable, but always deformed. These human figures are together, search each other, embrace each other or repel each other. The figures are in unspecified spaces. The moon, the sun and the contours of the earth are often present in her work. Often her work is accompanied by handwritten poetical lines.

== Selected exhibitions ==
Wortel had numerous exhibitions in the Netherlands and abroad, amongst others:

- 1960 De Posthoorn, The Hague, Netherlands.
- 1962 International Aquarel Exhibition, city at Bodensee in Friedrichshafen, Germany.
- 1963 Stedelijk Museum Amsterdam, Netherlands. Museum van Bommel van Dam, Venlo, Netherlands.
- 1964 Gemeentemuseum Den Haag, The Hague, Netherlands. Centre Cultural, São Paulo, Brazil. Stedelijk Museum het Prinsenhof, Delft, Netherlands.
- 1965 Stedelijk Museum Amsterdam, Netherlands.
- 1966 Rotterdam Artcircle. Exposition Plasmolen in Mook, Netherlands.
- 1967 Smithsonian Institution, Washington DC, United States.
- 1968 Salon Européen de Femme, Nancy, France. Salon Artistes Feminine, Paris, France. Stedelijk Museum Amsterdam, Netherlands. Museum van Bommel van Dam, Venlo, Netherlands.
- 1969 Curaçao Museum, Willemstad, Curaçao. Stedelijk Museum Amsterdam, Netherlands. Museum Waterland, Purmerend, Netherlands. Das Märkisches Museum der Stadt Witten - Duisburger Szession, Duisburg, Germany. Museum Fodor, Amsterdam, Netherlands.
- 1970 De Vaart, Hilversum, Netherlands.
- 1971 Galery In-Art, Amsterdam, Netherlands. Hengelo Arthall, Hengelo, Netherlands. Stedelijk Museum Amsterdam, Netherlands.
- 1972 Dwór Artusa (Artus Court), Gdańsk, Poland.
- 1973 Art and Glass - Glass industry Van Tetterode, Amsterdam. Stedelijk Museum Amsterdam, Netherlands.
- 1974 Museum van Bommel van Dam, Venlo. De Latemse Galerie, Sint-Martens-Latem, Belgium. Museum Oud Hospitaal, Aalst, Belgium.
- 1975 Olympia International Art Centre, Kingston, Jamaica.
- 1976 Stedelijk Museum Alkmaar, Netherlands.
- 1977 Stedelijk Museum Amsterdam, Netherlands. Exposition "year of the child" for Unicef, Turnhout, Belgium.
- 1980 Tempel gallery, Willemstad, Curaçao.
- 1986 Stedelijk Museum Woerden, Netherlands.
- 1988 Café In the cradle, New York, United States.
- 1989 Galery De Lelie, Antwerp, Belgium.
- 1994 Museum De Koperen Knop, Hardinxveld-Giessendam, Netherlands. Exposition Heuf, Aruba. Van Reekum Museum, Apeloorn, Netherlands.
- 2001 Museum Beeldentuin Nic Jonk, Grootschermer, Netherlands.
- 2013 Museum Jan van der Togt, Amstelveen, Netherlands.
- 2018 Museum Kranenburgh, Bergen NH, Netherlands.
- 2023 Museum Beeldentuin Nic Jonk, Grootschermer, Netherlands.

There were also expositions and contributions of Wortel at various events, such as (selection):

- 1969 Design of costumes and stage set for "Laat dat" (in English "Drop it"), performed by the Scapino Ballet in the City Theatre in Amsterdam, Netherlands.
- 1970 Simca show Alkmaar, Alkmaar, Netherlands.
- 1975 International Women's Year, First Women's International Art Exhibit. (Wortel represented the Netherlands)
- 1976 Artfestival 1976 Belgium/Netherlands.
- 1977 Institut Néerlandais, 20e année (20 years jubilee), Paris, France.
- 1983 The national Bookfestival, Amsterdam, Netherlands.
- 1991 Cultural festival Altea, Spain
- 1993 Gallery TNO, Netherlands. (Wortel made also a big 3x8 metres glass artwork for the TNO building).
- 1993 National Womensday at the town hall of Loon op Zand, Netherlands.
- 1994 National Womensday at the Delft University of Technology, Netherlands.

== Selected works ==
She wrote several Dutch collections of poetry in which her visual art and her poetry come together.

- Poetry book, untitled (1959, handmade limited edition)
- "Preken en prenten", in English: "Preaches and prints" (1969, Tor, ISBN 90-70055-05-8)
- "Voor ons de reizende vlezen rots...", in English: "To us the traveling rock made of flesh..." (1970, De Bezige Bij, ISBN 90-234-5114-7)
- "Voor die ziet met mijn soort ogen, door wiens ogen ik kan zien", in English: "For who sees with my kind of eye’s, by whose eye’s I'll see" (1970, handmade limited edition)
- "Wat ik vond en verloor", in English: "What I've found and lost" (1972, Tor, ISBN 90-70055-14-7)
- "Lessen aan die ik liefheb", in English: "Lessons to those I love" (1973, Tor, ISBN 90-70055-15-5)
- "Gedichten 1959-1963", in English: "Poems 1959-1963" (1989, Ans Wortel, De Fontijn, ISBN 90-261-0334-4)

In 1980, she started her autobiography which was finalized in 1986 (5 volumes in Dutch).

- "Een mens van onze soort", in English: "One of our kind" (1982, De Fontijn, ISBN 90-261-2121-0)
- "In de bloei van 't leven, noemen ze dat", in English: "In the prime of life, they call it" (1983, De Fontijn, ISBN 90-261-2139-3)
- "Noem mij maar Jon", in English: "Just call me Jon" (1983, De Fontijn, ISBN 90-261-2157-1)
- "Onderweg in Amsterdam", in English: "On the road in Amsterdam" (1984, De Fontijn, ISBN 90-261-0178-3)
- "Nannetje...", in English: "Nannetje..." (1986, De Fontijn, ISBN 90-261-0250-X)
