= Svavar Guðnason =

Icelandic painter (1909–1988)

- Born: 18 November 1909; Höfn í Hornafirði, Iceland
- Died: 25 June 1988 (aged 78); Reykjavík, Iceland
- Known for: avant-garde painting
- Movement: COBRA

Svavar Guðnason (18 November 1909 – 25 June 1988) was an Icelandic painter active in the avant-garde movement COBRA. He is considered one of the leading Icelandic twentieth-century abstract painters and his works can be found in major modern art museums in Europe and Scandinavia, for example in the Louisiana Museum in Denmark and the CoBrA Museum in the Netherlands.

== Life and career ==
Svavar Guðnason was born in Höfn, Hornafjörður in 1909 and was introduced to painting and drawing at a young age. He began painting in earnest in 1934 and a year later departed for Denmark. He studied with Kræsten Iversen at the Royal Danish Academy of Fine Arts from 1935 to 1936 and with Fernand Léger in Paris in 1938. In Copenhagen he became part of the CoBrA group of artists, including Asger Jorn and Karel Appel, and was the first Icelandic artist to develop an abstract expressionist style.

Svavar Guðnason was residing in Copenhagen when World War II broke out in 1939, and was unable to return to Iceland until 1945. That year, upon his arrival in Reykjavík, he arranged an exhibition of his works that art historian Ólafur Kvaran has termed "the beginning of abstract art in Iceland." He lived in Copenhagen until 1951, when he returned to Iceland for good. He was appointed a Commander of the Order of the Falcon by the President of Iceland in 1977, for his artistic work.

On the occasion of his centenary in 2009, a book containing a thorough examination of his life and works was published in Iceland.
