= Lotti van der Gaag =

- Born: 18 December 1923; The Hague
- Died: 20 February 1999, 19 February 1999 (aged 75); Nieuwegein
- Occupation: Painter, sculptor, ceramist, drawer
- Awards: Ouborg award (1993)

Charlotte "Lotti" van der Gaag (Dutch pronunciation: [ɕɑrˈlɔtə ˈlɔti vɑn dər ˈɣaːx]; 18 December 1923 – 19 February 1999) was a Dutch sculptor and painter and strongly associated with members of the COBRA arts movement.

== Life and career ==
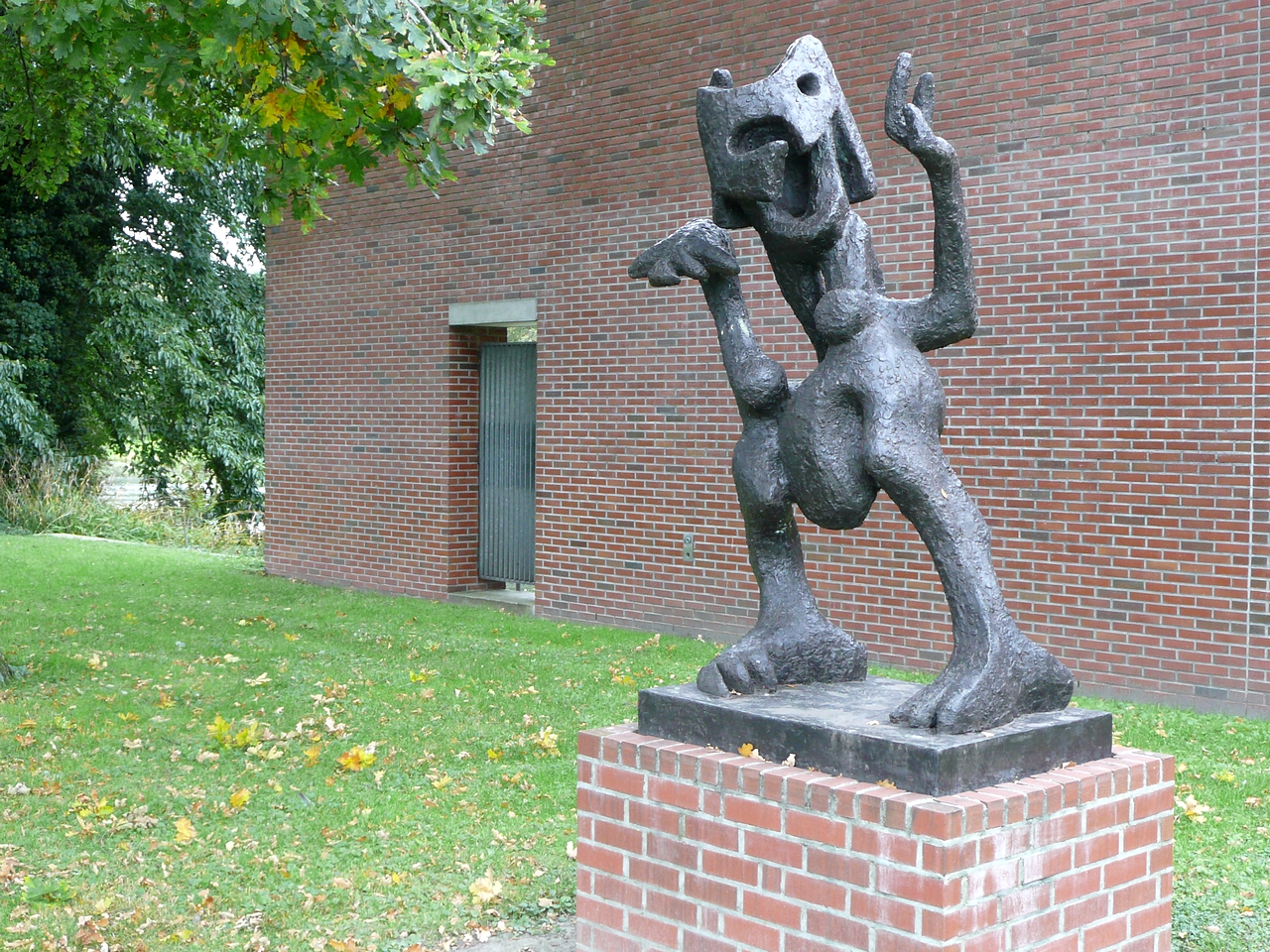
Sculpture by Van der Gaag in Amstelveen

Charlotte van der Gaag was born on 18 December 1923 in The Hague in the Netherlands.

Aged 20, she had a relationship with the artist Bram Bogart, who introduced her to sculpture.

Around 1950, she visited the Dutch poet Simon Vinkenoog in Paris; here she was introduced to members of COBRA, amongst them Karel Appel and Corneille. During this period she focused almost exclusively on her sculpture.

Van der Gaag died, at the age of 75, in Nieuwegein on 19 February 1999.
