= Jan Nieuwenhuys =

Dutch painter (1922–1986)

- Jan Nieuwenhuijs
- Born: Johannes Theodorus Nieuwenhuijs; 8 January 1922; Amsterdam, Netherlands
- Died: 28 December 1986 (aged 64); Amsterdam, Netherlands
- Education: Rijksnormaalschool voor Teekenonderwijzers, 1941; Rijksakademie van beeldende kunsten, 1942
- Occupation: Painter
- Movement: CoBrA
- Relatives: Constant Nieuwenhuys (brother)
- Website: jannieuwenhuys.com

Johannes "Jan" Theodorus Nieuwenhuys (Dutch: Jan Nieuwenhuijs; 8 January 1922 – 28 December 1986) was a Dutch painter and one of the early active founders of the Dutch Experimentalists group (Reflex) that later became part of CoBrA.

== Life and work ==
Nieuwenhuys was born on 8 January 1922 in Amsterdam. Nieuwenhuys was the younger brother of Constant Nieuwenhuys, a painter, sculptor, graphic artist, author and musician.

Around the age of 14, Nieuwenhuys and his brother Constant decided to become painters. From 1938 to 1941 he attended the Rijksnormaalschool in Amsterdam. Later in the Second World War he also took lessons at the Rijksacademie in Amsterdam. At the Rijksacademie he met Karel Appel and Corneille.

During World War II Nieuwenhuys painted almost only clowns, nudes and couples making love. Just after the war he started painting fantasy animals like aggressive cocks, cats and bulls. He and his brother Constant had many arguments about his paintings. During the war Constant himself painted only Catholic scenes like Pietà and Maria portraits or still lifes and thought that Nieuwenhuys chose his subjects too lightly.

In 1948 Appel, Elburg, Kouwenaar, Wolvekamp, Corneille, Constant Nieuwenhuys, Brands, Rooskens and Nieuwenhuys founded the Experimentele Groep in Holland that a few months later became the European group CoBrA. Jan was in his paintings of this period influenced by dreams, children's drawings, the artistic expressions of mentally handicapped people and primitive art. Animals such as birds and cats play a leading role in most of his works, along with fantastic creatures and beings that are made up of a combination of human, animal and mechanical elements. A lot of the creatures balance on a rope or wear boats as a hat.

Nieuwenhuys was soon disappointed in the members of the CoBrA group, some of them were more interested in fame than being an activist. He could not stand the fighting that was going on between the members and so he left the group in the middle of 1949. Some other members also left, but they later rejoined for the great exhibition in the Stedelijk Museum.

In 1964 he said in an interview: "The group was not founded as an exposition group but as a group of activists. We wanted to put an effort into that, to fight against the softness in art at the time and using our imagination to change that. Regrettably I must ascertain that many of the Experimentalists of that day also became esthetics. Everything official stops to be combatant. I think that work of some of them look very dormant these days".

Nieuwenhuys later concentrated only on his work. His paintings became more and more liberated and he experimented with different materials like fluorescent paint and everything he could get his hands on. Everything could become a painting.

In an interview from 1964 he said: "I start with my material and my color. With that I express myself. From the material I come to my subject and that is maybe contrary to what painters did in earlier days. I paint the way I write, the way I laugh. That is why I paint differently all the time, because my moods change. That’s the way I feel."

"As a painter I don’t want to paint a particular situation. I am not abstract, not really non-figurative. I try to be expressive and therefore I need certain images. Today I am in China, tomorrow in Paris, after tomorrow some other place. We are confronted every day with what happens in the world. You’re living on a specific spot, but also in the whole world. It’s maybe therefore that we become so ignorant and hard, because we experience too much. Hunger, war. That particular situation doesn’t mean anything anymore."

From the same interview: "I wish, if they see my work later on, that they can see the twentieth century. The artist must give his time a suit. And it doesn’t matter if he is an architect, poet or painter. In abstract painting I miss the beat of this time, the rudeness. We, the people of today we are living with the fear of an atom bomb. The abstracts are building only a superficial world for you."

He died in Amsterdam in 1986.
