= Museum Jan =

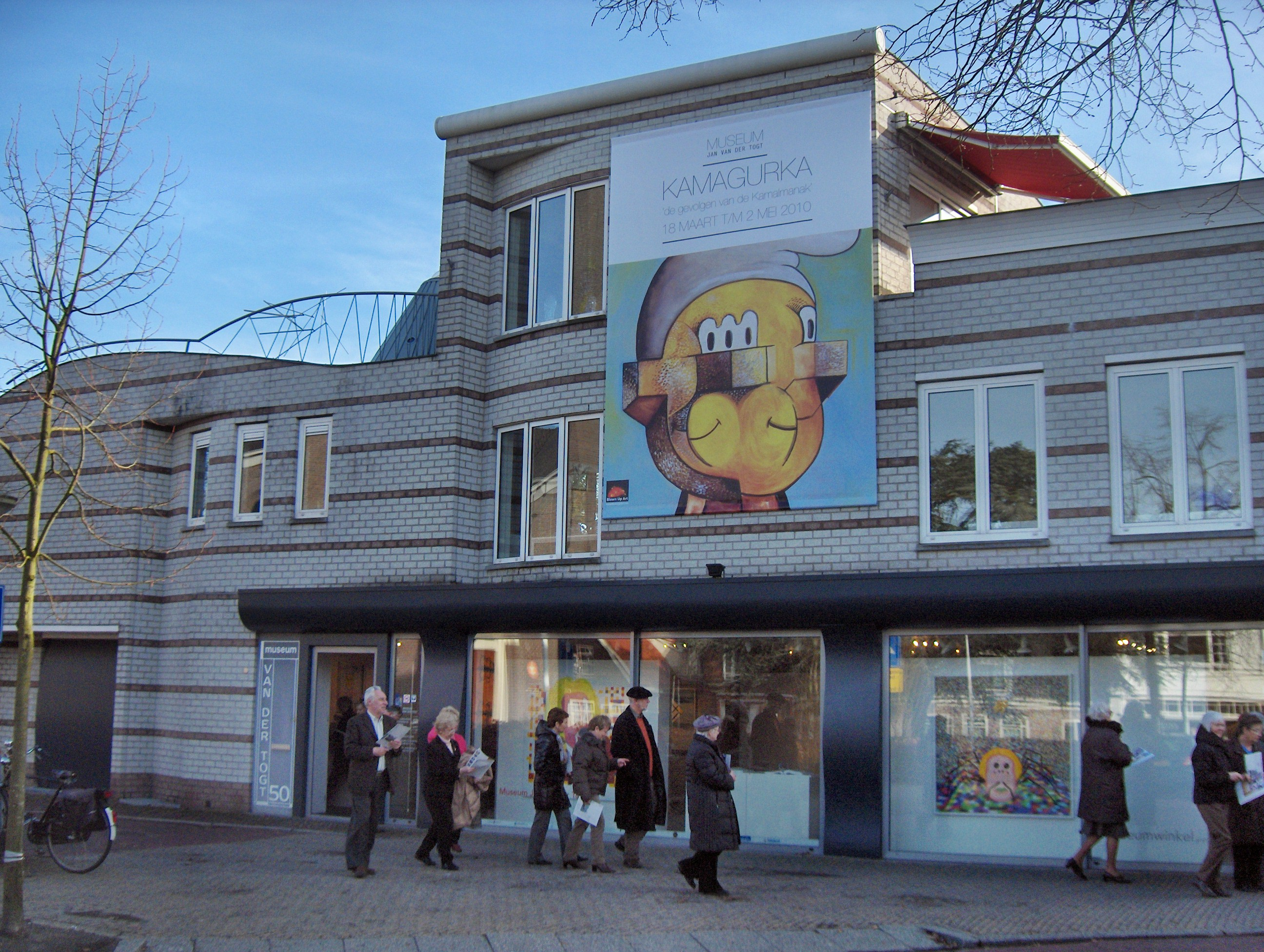
- Museum in 2010

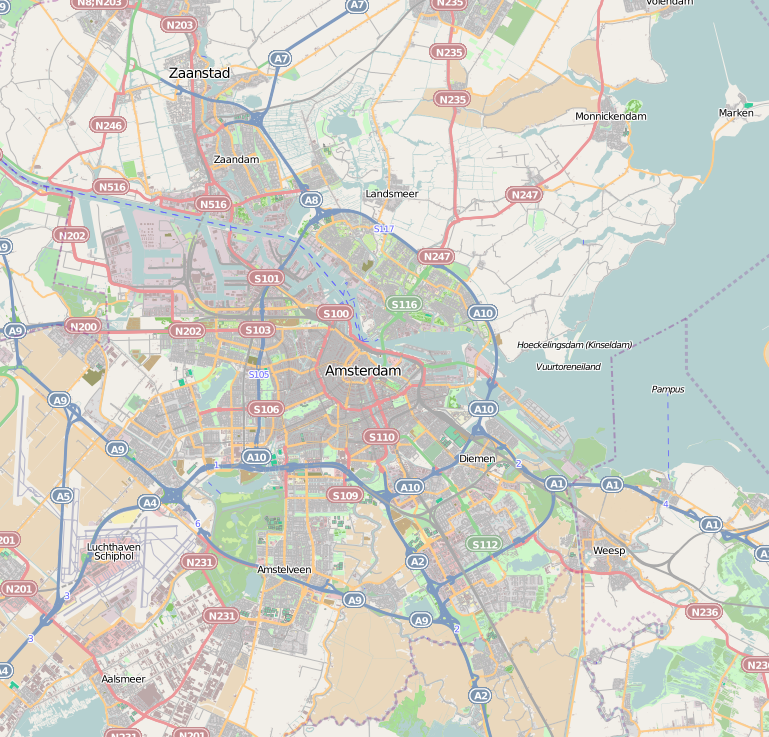
- Location in the greater Amsterdam area
- Established: 1991
- Location: Dorpsstraat 50; Amstelveen, Netherlands
- Coordinates: 52.3023°N 4.8466°E
- Type: Art museum
- Founder: Jan van der Togt
- Website: museumjan.nl

Museum Jan (until January 2020 Museum Jan van der Togt) is a modern visual art museum in Amstelveen, near Amsterdam in the Netherlands. It was established by 1991 by Jan van der Togt, an industrialist who was also the founder of the company Tomado who was a collector of contemporary art.

He wanted his collection to remain together and formed a foundation for this. Besides a permanent collection of paintings and sculptures, the museum has an important collection of modern glass art such as Libenský & Brychtová, Maria Lugosi and Bruno Pedrosa. They include masterpieces of avant-garde Czech glass artists such as Vaclav Cigler and Ales Vasicek.

Besides exhibitions from the permanent collection there are exhibitions several times a year, featuring notable artists in the modern visual art field such as Eugène Brands, Karel Appel, Ans Wortel, Anton Heyboer and Hugo Claus.

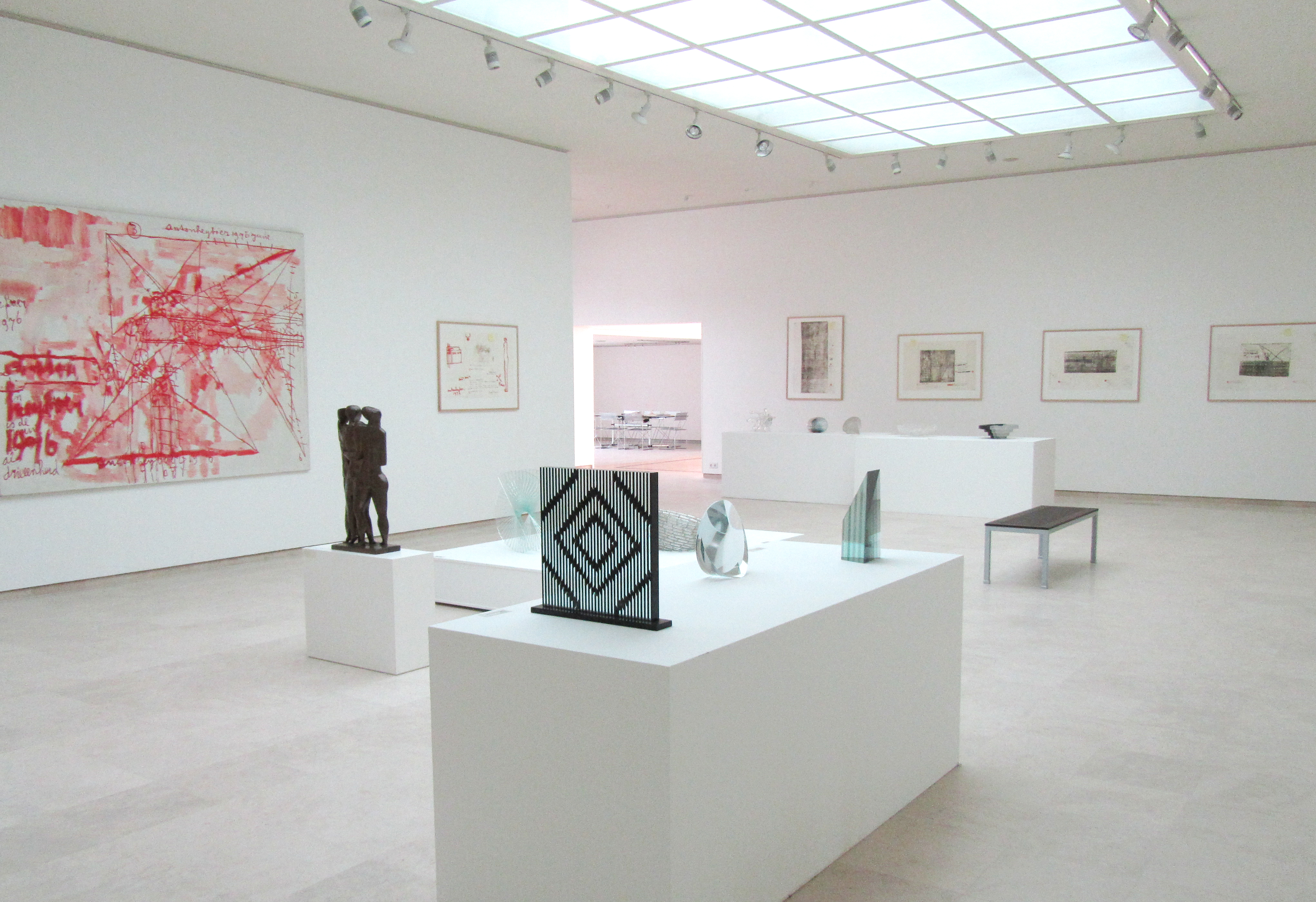
View of room in Museum Jan van der Togt
