= Anthony Viti =

American artist (born 1961)

- Born: 1961 (age 64–65); Rochester, New York
- Education: BFA/SUNY Purchase, MFA/Rutgers University
- Known for: visual art, art education

Anthony Viti (born 1961) is an American artist who lives and works at Brooklyn, New York. He is a visual artist and an art educator. Viti currently teaches at School of Visual Arts and Parsons.

== Work ==
Viti's art practice has focused on narratives of body and HIV and resulting sexual subcultures. He uses a variety of media; painting, sculpture, video, and installation that is both confrontational and high-spirited.

== Exhibitions ==
He had solo exhibitions at Art During the Occupation Gallery, Brooklyn, NY; Hudson D. Walker Gallery, Provincetown, MA; Deven Golden Fine Art, New York, NY; Tibor de Nagy Gallery, New York, NY; Leslie-Lohman Museum of Gay and Lesbian Art. His work has been exhibited in group exhibitions at the Ratio 3, San Francisco; Cobra Museum, Amsterdam; SCA Contemporary Art, Albuquerque; Sue Scott Gallery, New York, NY; Kinkead Contemporary, Culver City, CA; David Krut Projects, New York, NY; Ethan Cohen Fine Arts, New York, NY.

== Awards and honors ==
- Pollock-Krasner Foundation
- Fine Arts Work Center Fellowship
- Elizabeth Foundation for the Arts
- Penny McCall Foundation
- Art Matters Inc.

== Publications ==
- San Francisco Bay Guardian
- Contemporary Art Quarterly
- M/E/A/N/I/N/G: An Anthology of Artists'
- Writings, Theory, and Criticism; ARTnews; New York Times; Art in America; Artforum.]

== Collections ==
- The Metropolitan Museum of Art
