= Jerome Bech =

Dutch painter

- Born: Jerome Bech; 11 February 1970 (age 56); Amsterdam, Netherlands
- Education: Autodidactive Painter
- Known for: Painting
- Movement: Independent

Jerome Bech (born 1970) is a Dutch painter, known for his colourful paintings and sculptures.

== Early life ==
Bech was born in Amsterdam and grew up in Hoevelaken. He attended a Waldorf school, known for its foundation in Anthroposophy. In the 1980s he moved with his parents and brother close to Bergen, North Holland.

== Career ==
Bech started his career in several areas but none satisfied him, until he found out he liked to paint and create objects of all kinds of materials. He was initially strongly influenced by the COBRA movement. Early in his career his talent was noticed by Lucebert, who saw one of Bech's first pieces and commented that whoever created it had talent which could be developed further as an independent artist. As an autodidactive artist, he developed his own style which has incorporated various objects — a brush, a chain — anything he can think of with his creative mind.

In 2003, Bech had an exposition in the Art Calvia Grand Casino at Mallorca, Spain. From October 2006 to June 2007 Bech was one of the artists involved in the "Taste of art" project where diners at the 't Jagershuis restaurant in Ouderkerk aan de Amstel dined off a plate he had designed and took the plate home. In April 2007, Bech was involved in a project together with Harold van Geerestein in Muiden, The Netherlands.

== Sources ==
- DZD Art Gallery
- Nederlandse Galerie Associatie
- Noball Kunstbemiddeling
