= Cobra Museum =

Cobra Museum of Modern Art
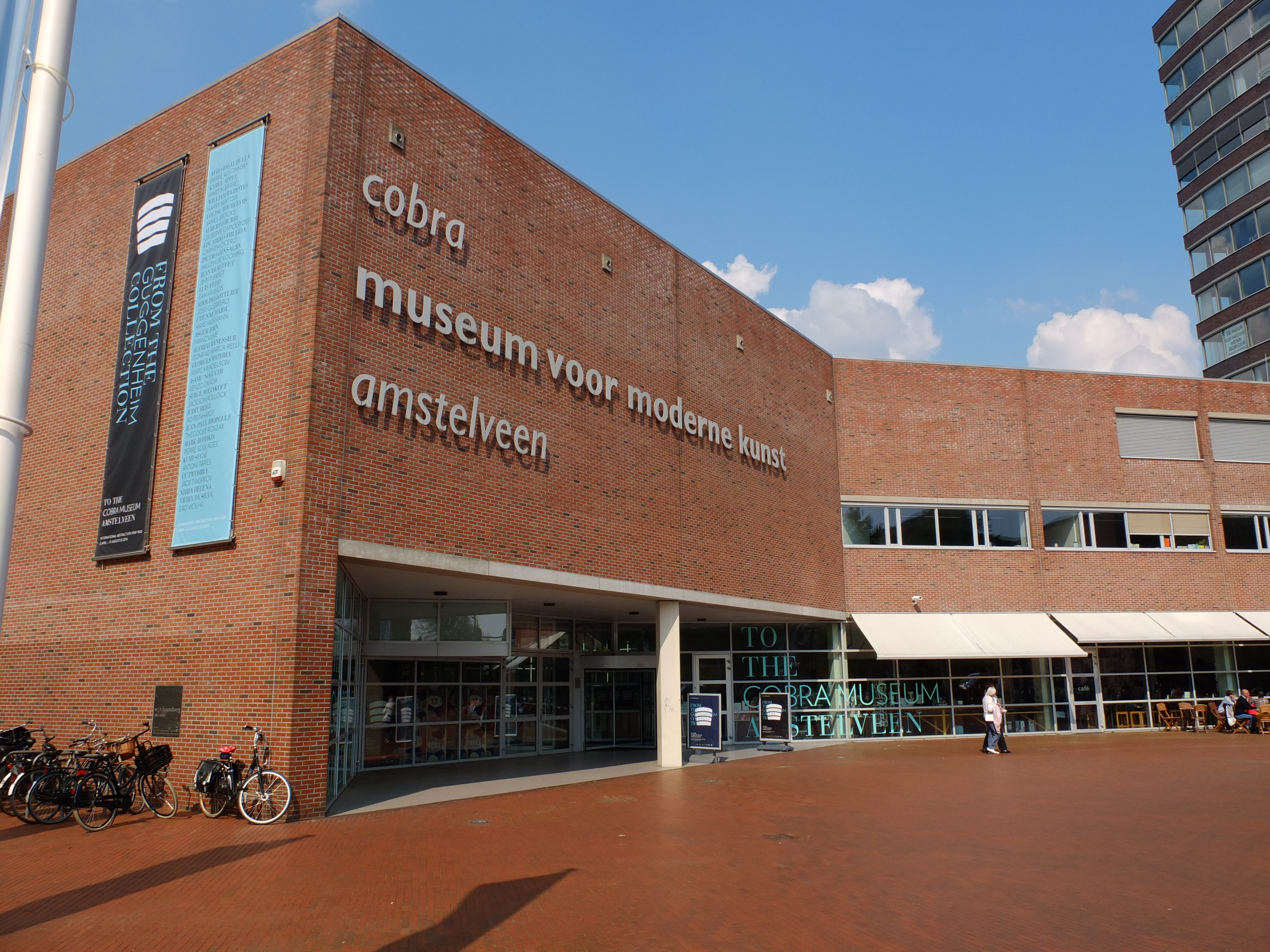
- The entrance of the museum (2014)
- Established: 8 November 1995
- Location: Sandbergplein 1 Amstelveen, Netherlands
- Coordinates: 52.3040°N 4.8578°E
- Type: Art museum
- Visitors: 95,960 (2014)
- Director: Stefan van Raay
- Architect: Wim Quist
- Public transit access: Busstation Amstelveen
- Parking: Parking garage Stadshart
- Website: www.cobra-museum.nl

The Cobra Museum of Modern Art (Dutch: Cobra Museum voor Moderne Kunst) is an art museum in Amstelveen in the Netherlands. The collection of the museum consists of key works by artists associated with three art movements, Vrij Beelden (1945), Cobra (1948–1951), and Creatie (1950–1955). In addition, the museum organizes temporary exhibitions by national and international avant-garde artists.

== History ==
The Cobra Museum of Modern Art opened its doors on November 8, 1995, as a reference to the founding date of the Cobra movement on the 8th of November, 1948. Architect Wim Quist designed the building. Initially, the museum exhibited the private collection of collector J. Karel P. van Stuijvenberg. Later on, the collection was regularly supplemented with own purchases, long-term loans and donations.

From the beginning of the twenty-first century, the museum has also come to focus on contemporary artists who work in the spirit of Cobra. This focus has led, among other things, to the Cobra Kunstprijs Amstelveen, which was awarded biennially between 2005 and 2017 to 'a visual artist who creates innovative work that demonstrates commitment in the spirit of the Cobra movement.' The laureates are Joost Conijn (2005), Johannes Schwartz (2007), Gijs Frieling (2009), Nathaniel Mellors (2011), Metahaven (2013), Jennifer Tee (2015) and Christian Friedrich (2017). The prize consisted of a cash prize, an exhibition in the Cobra Museum, and a catalog or other publication accompanying that exhibition. The museum is also involved in the triennial Amstelveen Triënnale.

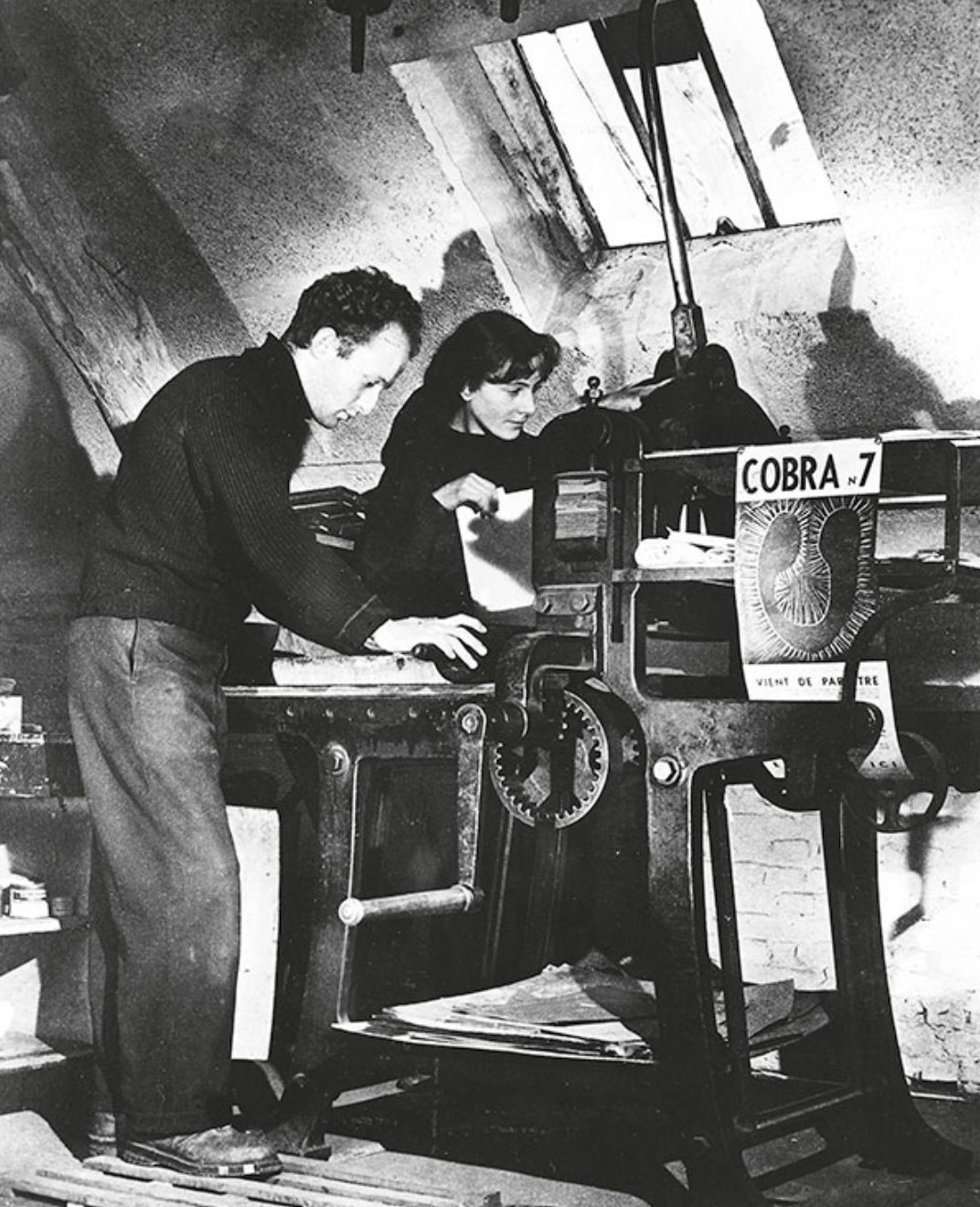
Cobra

=== Exhibitions (selection) ===
- Guggenheim Collection to the Cobra Museum of Modern Art (2014)
- Miró & CoBrA, experimental play (2016)
- Le Corbusier's fourth dimension (2017)
- Eugène Brands: From living room to universe (2018)
- An indomitable force: The child as a source of inspiration
- New Nuances: Female artists in and around Cobra (2019)
- This is Surrealism! The Boijmans Masterpieces (2020)
- Under the Skin: The Life and Work of Claude Cahun (2020)
- Frida Kahlo & Diego Rivera: A Love Revolution (2021)
- Constant 101: The future can be humane (2022)

== The Cobra-movement ==
Cobra was an international movement of young, progressive artists. In the years after the Second World War, they caused a revolution: a breakthrough in modern art that still has an impact on art ideas and expressions today.

The Cobra movement was founded in Paris on November 8, 1948. Artists and poets from various European countries were members. The joy of total spiritual and artistic freedom and spontaneity had to counterbalance the nightmare of the war. Cobra caused great commotion in the Netherlands. The newspapers talked about tampering, clattering and slandering. In the meantime, the then revolutionary Cobra has become anchored in European art history. In it, Cobra is mainly associated with colorful, expressive-spontaneous painting that has had its influence for a long time.

The founders differed quite a bit in their ideas about the meaning of Cobra. For some that significance lies in Cobra's contribution to painterly developments, for others in Cobra's spirit of absolute freedom, and for others in the collaborations between the members and the cross-fertilization between poets and painters. One thing is certain: there has never been a consensus about the meaning of Cobra. Cobra's character is perhaps defined by the contradictions and disagreements between its members, something which gave Cobra its vitality.

== Collection ==
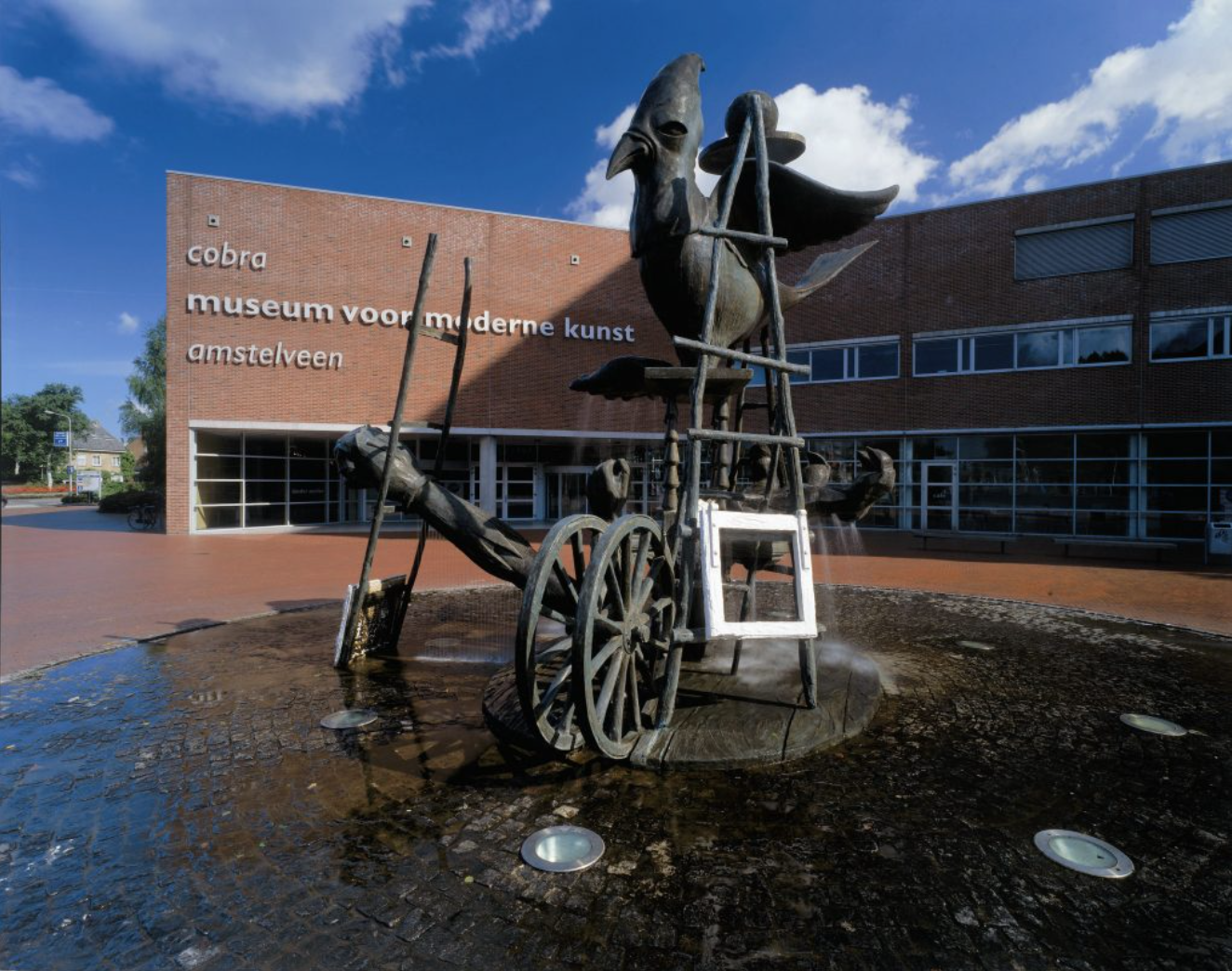
The fountain by Karel Appel in front of the Cobra Museum

The permanent collection of the Cobra Museum has its roots in the private collection of J. Karel P. van Stuijvenberg. The collection includes works by well-known Cobra artists such as Karel Appel, Constant, Lucebert and Corneille. More unknown group members, as well as related artists who were never officially part of this group, have also been given a place in the collection. These include Anton Rooskens, Eugène Brands, Jan Sierhuis, Theo Wolvecamp and Lotti van der Gaag. During changing collection presentations, work from the collection is shown, sometimes arranged thematically. In addition to paintings, sculptures and other unique items, the museum also owns a large collection of Cobra publications. The Cobra Museum also maintains close ties with other museums of which Cobra forms an important part of the collection, such as Stedelijk Museum Amsterdam and Stedelijk Museum Schiedam.

=== The fountain by Karel Appel ===
The five-meter high statue The fountain in front of the entrance of the museum was made especially for the museum by Karel Appel. The statue contains four water outlets and it is the only fountain ever made by Karel Appel. The unveiling of the statue took place in 2001 on the occasion of Appel's eightieth birthday. The model of the fountain was donated to the museum by Karel Appel and is on permanent display. The fist in the fountain symbolizes strength and the bird represents freedom. Various elements that make up the fountain are so-called objets trouvés.

== The building ==
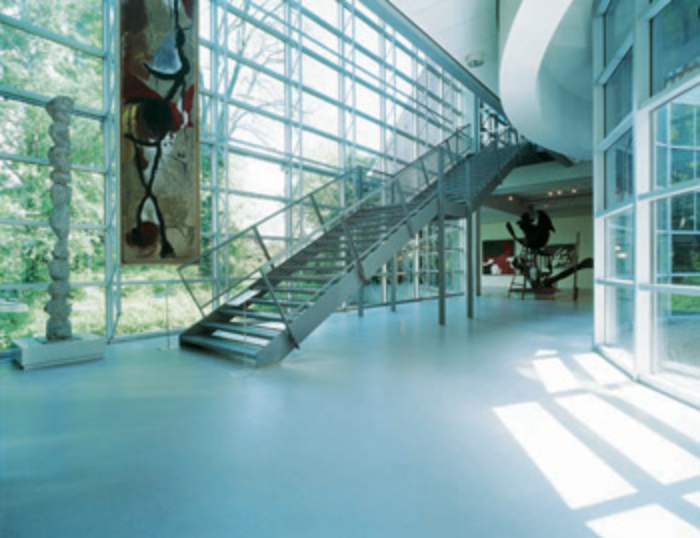
Interior Cobra Museum, designed by Wim Quist

The museum was designed by architect Wim Quist. Characteristic is the large amount of natural light that falls through the large windows on the ground floor. The space is about 2500 square meters, spread over two floors. Collection presentations are usually shown on the ground floor, but there is often also space for temporary exhibitions. The museum and shop are also located there, where, among other things, a wide range of books is sold about Cobra and related artists. Temporary exhibitions are organized on the second floor. There is also space here for work from the permanent collection, as well as a children's studio, in which creative and educational workshops related to Cobra are organized.

Appropriately enough, the building is situated on Sandbergplein, which is named after Willem Sandberg, former director of the Stedelijk Museum Amsterdam, who was responsible for the controversial first major Cobra exhibition in 1949. Leo Duppen, director of the Cobra Museum when it was founded, described the building as 'thought out and functional, there is nothing superfluous and the walking route is logical. Inside everything is white and gray, the color must come from the paintings.'

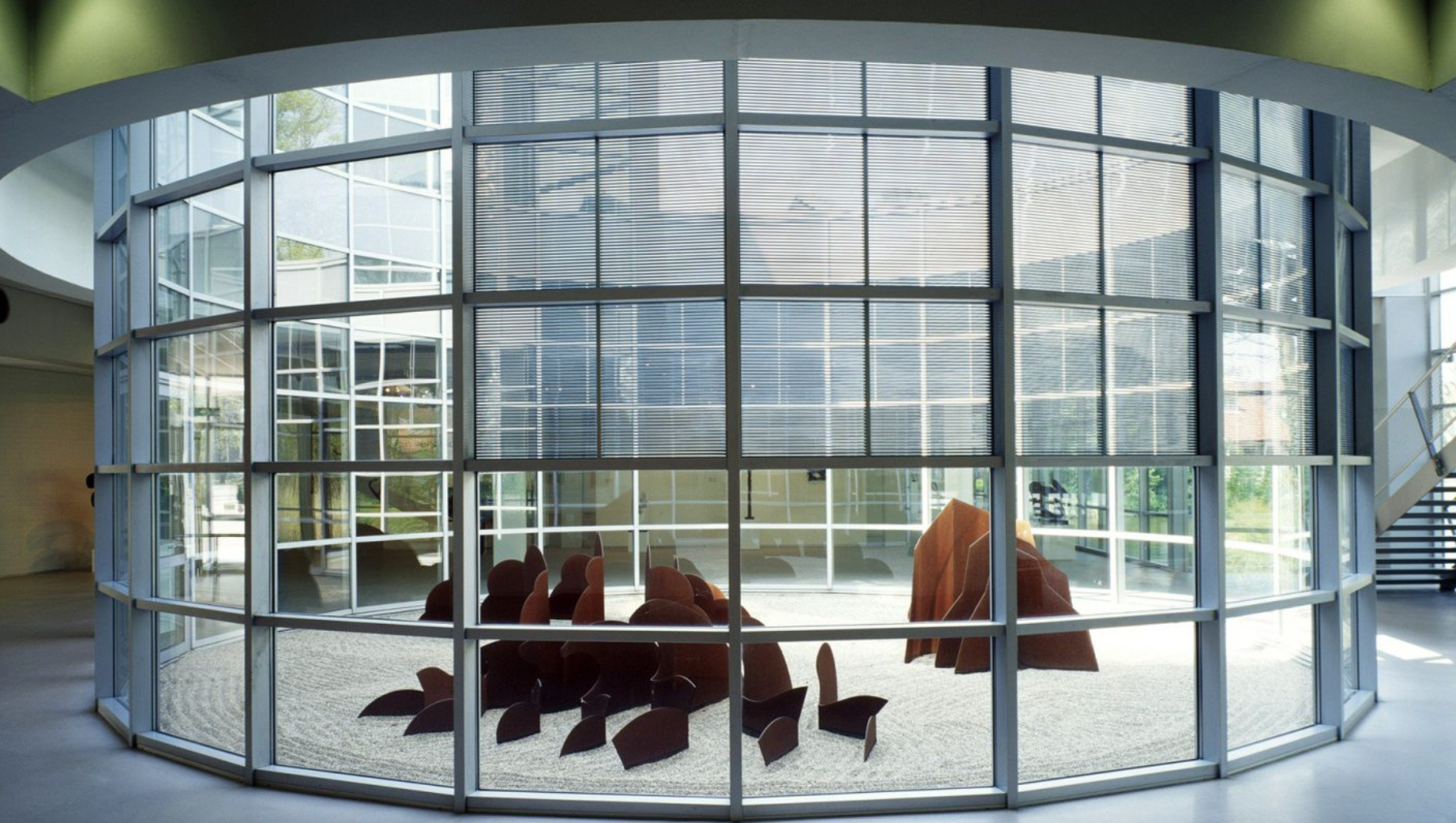
Inner garden Cobra Museum by Shinkichi Tajiri

=== Inner garden of Shinkichi Tajiri ===
The Cobra Museum has a round, inaccessible inner garden, in the form of a Japanese zen garden, which was created by Shinkichi Tajiri. The garden was specially designed by Tajiri for the Cobra Museum and was unveiled at the museum's opening in 1995. The garden depicts a haiku, which refers to the four elements. The standing, organically shaped plates of corten steel refer to the mountains (earth), the sea (water) and the clouds (sky). The sun shining on the artwork symbolizes the fire. The sheets of steel are placed on a pattern of pebbles raked with specially crafted tools, which is maintained monthly in flowing and concentric shapes.
