= Joseph Noiret =

Belgian poet and painter (1927–2012)

- Born: Joseph Noiret; 28 February 1927; Brussels, Belgium
- Died: 17 January 2012 (aged 84); Brussels, Belgium
- Occupations: Poet; writer; painter

Joseph Noiret (28 February 1927 – 17 January 2012) was a Belgian painter, writer and poet. He was also the founder of COBRA (avant-garde movement) and Review Phantomas, and director of La Cambre long.

== Biography ==
=== Early life ===
Noiret was born on 28 February 1927 in Belgium. At the young age, as a student he wrote poems from 1944. He was communist militant and at age 20, joined the "Surrealism revolutionary", the adventure of the ephemeral. He met Christian Dotremont, and in November 1948, in Paris during a conference he met with several international revolutionary groups. He died on 17 January 2012 after suffering long illness. He was the father of choreographer Michèle Noiret and historian Serge Noiret.

== Career ==
Noiret is considered important figure in the field of art and culture of Belgium. He was the last of six founders of the Cobra movement to be alive. He also established the cult magazine "Phantomas" in 1953. He was the director of the long school La Cambre in Brussels.

Noiret has written many poems and articles for exhibitions and reviews of Cobra. After the end of the movement in 1951, he went his own way to make a new shape of Cobra and chose paths where literature was that time at the forefront, without losing the link with the other arts. Later he launched "Phantomas".

He was also a painter and he continued to mix with painters. His collections of poetry were illustrated by him and by his artist friends as like Mogens Balle, Maurice Wijckaert and Sergio Dangelo.

== See also ==
- List of Belgians

== Bibliography ==
Poems (in French)

- L'Aventure dévorante (ill. Pol Bury, 1950)
- Histoires naturelles de la Crevêche (ill. Mogens Balle)
- L'Œil, l'oreille et le lieu (1974)
- L'Espace oblique (ill. Godfried Wiegand, 1986)
- La Mire du temps (ill. Serge Vandercam)
- La Conversation de Bierges avec Serge Vandercam (1992)
- À l'improviste (2001)
