= Koos de Bruin =

Dutch painter

Koos de Bruin (31 December 1941 – 15 March 1992) was a Dutch painter, draftsman, sculptor and graphic artist.

== Early life ==
Koos de Bruin was born on 31 December 1941 in Gouda, South Holland. At an early age, he showed an aptitude for art and planned to attend secondary school at a drawing academy. After a difficult childhood, at the age of 14 he left home and began working as a road worker and truck driver to provide an income for living expenses, while painting in the evening. De Bruin attended the Royal Academy of Art in The Hague for a year, which he would eventually leave due to conflict with his lecturers. After this period he continued his art practice, learning how to work with different mediums and in varying artistic styles.

== Career ==
In the early period of his career, de Bruin predominantly worked figuratively with his style becoming gradually more primitive and expressionistic. De Bruin applied for an artist subsidy and was selected for the program in 1969. After receiving this funding, de Bruin could focus entirely on his artistic practice and had no need to maintain other employment. As a part of the Third British International Print Biennale, he exhibited at Cartwright Hall in 1972 alongside artists including Andy Warhol, Roy Lichenstein, Eduardo Paolozzi, Robert Rauschenberg, Marino Marini and Claes Oldenburg. In 1978 he was invited to become a member of Pulchri Studio and regularly participated in group exhibitions in the spring and autumn.

In 1985, Koos won the Jacob Hartog Prize, the Pulchri Studio publication commented: 'People particularly appreciated the open way of painting in shades of gray, white orange, ocher and the slate-blue of the accompanying wood plastic. The jury sees both works, wood sculpture and painting as a unit. The jury realized that the danger of failure is great in this expressive way of working.'

As his career progressed he became influenced by the styles of the CoBRA movement as well as by neo-expressionism. Koos de Bruin exhibited in the United Kingdom, Canada, (Germany) and Belgium, as well as within the Netherlands.

De Bruin maintained a connection with the Pulchri Studio during the rest of his life, with Dutch photographer Marianne Dommisse writing in 1989, 'Koos de Bruin has balanced on the edge of the cut. However, this painter's adventure he has come through unharmed; in large format he achieves an exciting and successful result.' He was added to the Netherlands Institute for Art History artist database in 1992.

In 2004, de Bruin's paintings were exhibited at the Cobra Museum.

== Death ==
Koos de Bruin died in Gouda, aged 50, on 15 March 1992, shortly after being diagnosed with cancer.
