= Erik Ortvad =

Danish artist (1917–2008)

- Born: 18 June 1917; Copenhagen
- Died: 29 February 2008 (aged 90); Kvänjarp
- Movement: COBRA (avant-garde movement)

Erik Ortvad (18 June 1917 in Copenhagen – 29 February 2008 in Kvänjarp) was a painter and a creator of many drawings. He debuted as a painter in 1935. He is mostly known for colorful surrealistic paintings. . He also created several hundred satiric drawings about the modern way of life under the pseudonym Enrico.

In 1948 he was a founding member of the COBRA avant-garde art movement.

He is represented in the Museum of Modern Art in New York City and Statens Museum for Kunst in Copenhagen.

During the second world war he lived as a refugee in Sweden due to communist sympathies and a Jewish wife, and in 1962 he returned and settled in a croft in Kvänjarp, Ljungby Municipality, Småland, Sweden where he lived for the rest of his life.

== Bibliography ==
- Ortvad, Erik: Den "kære" familie (drawings under the name Enrico), A/S Uniprint, Copenhagen 1971, ISBN 87-18-00046-0

== Sources ==
- Ljungberg, Pontus: Erik Ortvad 15.9 - 25.11 2007 - an introduction to a retrospective exhibition
- Brunskog, Per: Ljungbergmuseet, Ljungby: Erik Ortvad (15/9-25/11)
