= Serge Vandercam =

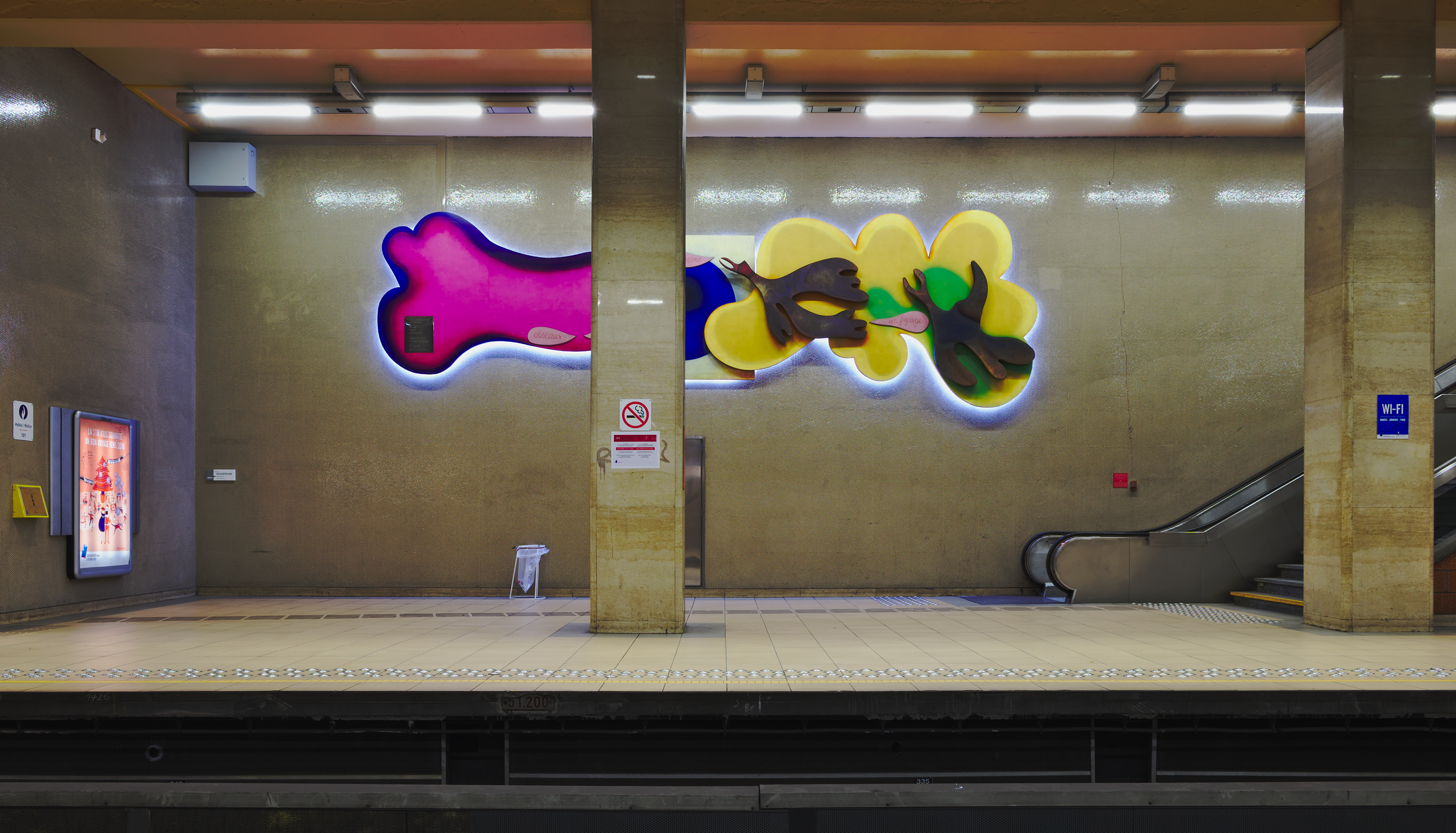
"Les oiseaux émerveillés" by Serge Vandercam in Joséphine-Charlotte metro station

Serge Vandercam (1924, in Copenhagen – 10 March 2005, in Wavre) was a Danish-born Belgian painter, photographer, sculptor and ceramist associated with the CoBrA group.
