= COBRA (art movement) =

Artist collective and art movement

CoBrA
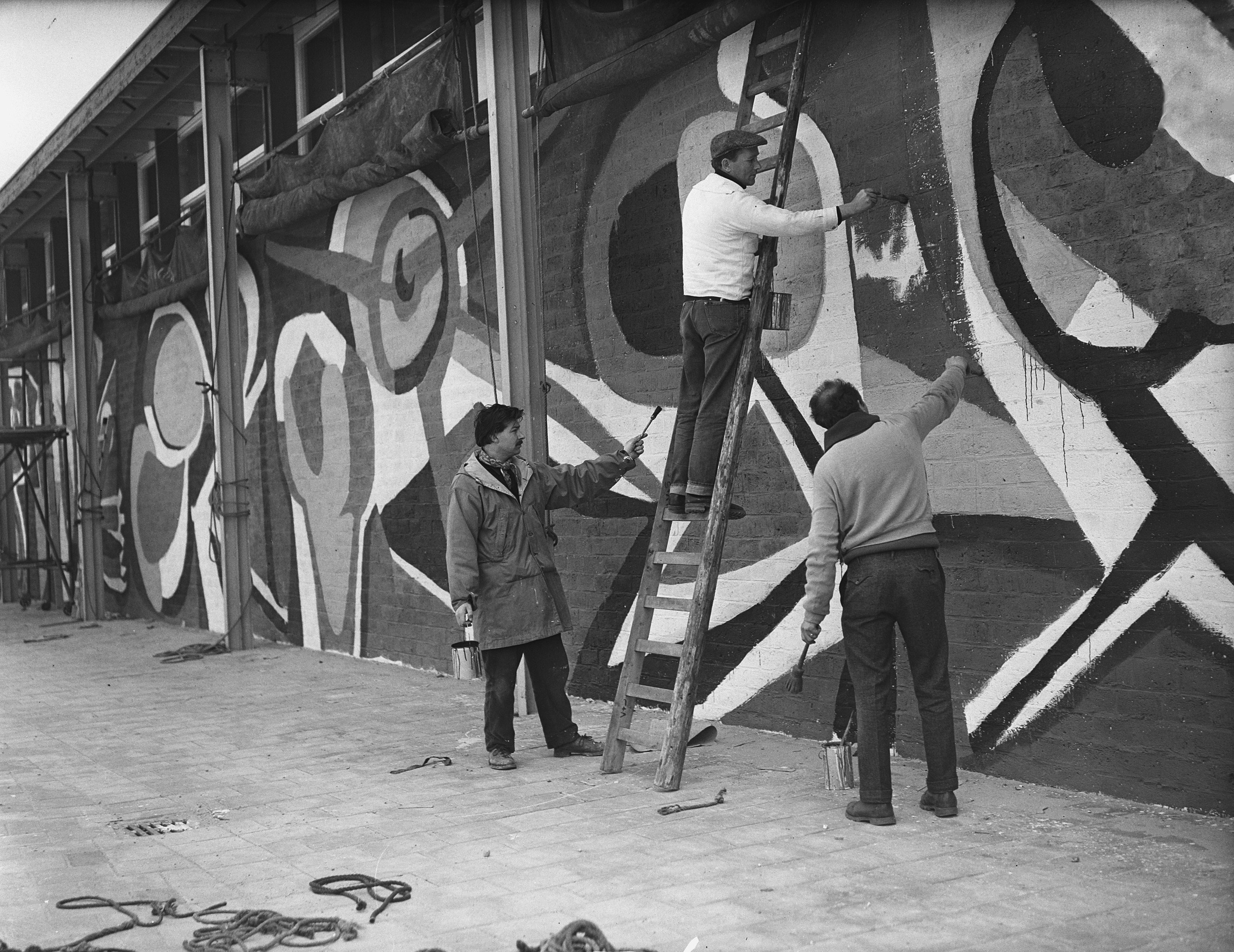
- CoBrA member Karel Appel working on a mural in Rotterdam for the Manifestation E55
- Years active: 1948–1951
- Location: Europe
- Major figures: Karel Appel; Constant; Corneille; Christian Dotremont; Asger Jorn; Joseph Noiret
- Influences: Surrealism
- Influenced: Informalism; Gruppe SPUR; MIBI; Arte nucleare; SI

COBRA or Cobra, often stylized as CoBrA, was a European avant-garde art group active from 1948 to 1951. The name was coined in 1948 by Christian Dotremont from the initials of the members' home countries' capital cities: Copenhagen (Co), Brussels (Br), Amsterdam (A).

== History ==
CoBrA was formed in 1948. This international movement of artists who worked experimentally evolved from the criticisms of Western society and a common desire to break away from existing art movements, including the "detested" naturalism and the "sterile" abstraction. Experimentation was the symbol of an unfettered freedom, which, according to Constant, was ultimately embodied by children and the expressions of children. CoBrA was formed by Karel Appel, Constant, Corneille, Christian Dotremont, Asger Jorn, and Joseph Noiret on 8 November 1948 in the Café Notre-Dame, Paris, with the signing of a manifesto, "La cause était entendue" ("The Case Was Settled"), drawn up by Dotremont. Formed with a unifying doctrine of complete freedom of colour and form, as well as antipathy towards Surrealism, the artists also shared an interest in Marxism as well as modernism.

Their working method was based on spontaneity and experiment, and they drew their inspiration in particular from children's drawings, from primitive art forms and from the work of Paul Klee and Joan Miró.

Coming together as an amalgamation of the Dutch group Reflex, the Danish group Høst and the Belgian Revolutionary Surrealist Group, the group only lasted a few years but managed to achieve a number of objectives in that time: the periodical Cobra, a series of collaborations between various members called Peintures-Mot and two large-scale exhibitions. The first of these was held at the Stedelijk Museum in Amsterdam, November 1949, the other at the Palais des Beaux-Arts in Liège in 1951.

The group is notable for having a Black artist member, Ernest Mancoba, who was married to Sonja Ferlov Mancoba, a Danish sculptor who was one of a few active women in the movement.

In November 1949 the group officially changed its name to Internationale des Artistes Expérimentaux with membership having spread across Europe and the United States, although this name has never stuck. The movement was officially disbanded in 1951, but many of its members remained close, with Dotremont in particular continuing collaborations with many of the leading members of the group. The primary focus of the group consisted of semi-abstract paintings with brilliant color, violent brushwork, and distorted human figures inspired by primitive and folk art and similar to American action painting. CoBrA was a milestone in the development of Tachisme and European abstract expressionism.

CoBrA was perhaps the last avant-garde movement of the twentieth century. According to Nathalie Aubert the group only lasted officially for three years (1948 to 1951). After that period each artist in the group developed their own individual paths.

=== Manifesto ===
The manifesto, entitled, "La cause était entendue" (The Case Was Settled) was written by CoBrA member Christian Dotremont and signed by all founding members in Paris in 1948. It was directly speaking to their experience attending the Centre International de Documentation sur l'Art d'Avant-garde in which they felt the atmosphere was sterile and authoritarian. It was a statement of working collaboratively in an organic mode of experimentation in order to develop their work separate from the current place of the avant-garde movement. The name of the manifesto was also a play on words from an earlier document signed by Belgian and French Revolutionary Surrealists in July 1947, entitled "La cause est entendue" (The Case Is Settled).

== Method ==
The European artists were different from their American counterparts (the Abstract expressionists) for they preferred the process over the product and introduced primitive, mythical, and folkloric elements along with a decorative input from their children and graffiti. One of the new approaches that united the CoBrA artists was their unrestrained use of strong colors, along with violent handwritings and figuration which can be either frightening or humorous. Their art was alive with subhuman figures in order to mirror the terror and weakness of our time unlike the dehumanized art of Abstraction. This spontaneous method was a rejection of Renaissance art, specialization, and 'civilized art', they preferred 'uncivilized' forms of expression which created an interplay between the conscious and the unconscious instead of the Surrealist interest in the unconscious alone. The childlike in their method meant a pleasure in painting, in the materials, forms, and finally the picture itself; this aesthetic notion was called 'desire unbound'. The Dutch Artists in particular within CoBrA (Corneille, Appel, Constant) were interested in Children's art."We Wanted to start again like a child" Karel Appel insisted. As part of the Western Left, they were built upon the fusion of Art and Life through experiment in order to unite form and expression.

== CoBrA exhibitions ==
They exhibited mainly in Holland, but also Paris and other countries in Europe.

=== Stedelijk Museum exhibition ===
The first major exhibition was held at the Stedelijk Museum Amsterdam in November 1949 under the title "International Experimental Art". Else Alfelt, one of a few women involved in the movement, participated in this first exhibition.

The museum's director and curator Willem Sandberg was interested in bringing experimentalism and abstraction to The Netherlands, and had also been an active member of the Dutch Resistance during the war. He was deeply involved with the CoBrA group and maintained direct contacts between the artists and the Stedelijk Museum.

The architect Aldo van Eyck, who would later become known for his architecture of playgrounds as cultural critique, was asked to do the interior design of the exhibition. The close relationship between Van Eyck and the artists from the CoBrA, who also drew their inspiration in particular from children's drawings, makes it probable that much of Eyck's early inspiration for the playgrounds may have derived from CoBrA.

The Stedelijk Museum exhibition gave rise to furious criticism from press and the public. A critic from Het Vrije Volk (Free People) wrote, "Geklad, geklets en geklodder in het Stedelijk Museum" ("Smirch, twaddle and mess in the SMA"). The CoBrA artists are considered scribblers and con artists. Newspapers spoke of offensive art and provocation on the part of the artists, and one evening for experimental poetry at the Stedelijk was the occasion for a public brawl.

=== Exhibition in Liège ===
The last CoBrA exhibit was located in Liège, Belgium, in 1951. Shortly after this exhibit, the group dissolved. The show was organised by Pierre Alechinsky, an artist from Belgium. The Dutch architect, Van Eyck designed the exhibition layout, just as he had for the 1949 CoBrA exhibition in Stedelijk. The innovations of this exhibit were that the composition for the wall was in a grid formation. In addition, the sculptures, which were featured in this show were on coal beds from the Liège area itself.

This show was not specific to only CoBrA artists, and also, major artists of the CoBrA movement were not in this exhibit due to the existing conflict within the group that eventually led to the collapse of CoBrA shortly after in the same year.

=== Group shows ===
- WestKunst (Cologne, 1981)
- Paris-Paris (Paris, 1981)
- Aftermath (London, 1981)
- Two Survey shows (Hamburg, 1982; Paris and the French provinces also 1982)
- The Spirit of Cobra (Fort Lauderdale, 2013)
- CoBrA (Mannheim, 2023)

== Participants ==
- Karel Appel (1921–2006)
- Pierre Alechinsky (born 1927)
- Else Alfelt (1910–1974)
- Jean-Michel Atlan (1913–1960)
- Mogens Ball (1921–1988)
- Ejler Bille (1910–2004)
- Eugene Brands (1913–2002)
- Pol Bury (1922–2005)
- Hugo Claus (1929–2008)
- Constant (1920–2005)
- Corneille (1922–2010)
- Christian Dotremont (1922–1979)
- Jacques Doucet (1924–1994)
- Lotti van der Gaag (1923–1999)
- William Gear (1915–1997)
- Stephen Gilbert (1910–2007)
- Svavar Guðnason (1909–1988)
- Carl-Otto Hultén (1916–2015)
- Henry Heerup (1907–1993)
- Edouard Jaguer (1924–2006)
- Asger Jorn (1914–1973)
- Lucebert (1924–1994)
- Ernest Mancoba (1904–2002)
- Sonja Ferlov Mancoba (1911–1984)
- Jan Nieuwenhuys (1922–1986)
- Joseph Noiret (1927–2012)
- Erik Ortvad (1917–2008)
- Carl-Henning Pedersen (1913–2007)
- Anton Rooskens (1906–1976)
- Serge Vandercam (1924–2005)

=== Related artists ===
Notable artists who had contact with, and/or were influenced by CoBrA:

- Enrico Baj
- Bram Bogart
- Jerome Bech
- James E. Brewton
- Jan Cobbaert
- Jacqueline de Jong
- Koos de Bruin
- Freddy Flores Knistoff
- Herbert Gentry
- Robert Jacobsen
- Bengt Lindström
- Jean Messagier
- Vali Myers
- John Olsen
- Gina Pellón (1926–2014)
- Soshana Afroyim (1927–2015)
- Dana Schutz
- Shinkichi Tajiri
- Alasdair Taylor
- Louis Van Lint
- Maurice Wyckaert (1923–1996)
- Valeriu Pantazi (1940–2015)

=== Criticism ===
- Alison M. Gingeras praises CoBrA as being a "...wonderfully messy, cacophonous, and multi-tentacled," entity.
- Ernest Mancoba (1904–2002), of South Africa, claimed to be one of the only black artists of CoBrA. In his own words, Mancoba, a clear supporter of the CoBrA movement, criticizes the views of his fellow artists regarding himself: "The embarrassment that my presence caused to the point of making me, in their eyes, some sort of 'Invisible Man' or merely the consort of a European woman artist—was understandable, as before me there had never been to my knowledge any black man taking part in the visual arts 'avant garde' of the Western World."

== Legacy ==
There is a Cobra Museum in Amstelveen, Netherlands, displaying works by Karel Appel and other international avant-garde artists.

The NSU Art Museum in Fort Lauderdale, Florida, is known for its large assemblage of works of CoBrA art. The museum displays works by Karel Appel, Pierre Alechinsky, and Asger Jorn, the movement's leading exponents.

Auctioneers Bruun Rasmussen held an auction of CoBrA artists on April 3, 2006 in Copenhagen. It set records for the highest price for an Asger Jorn painting (6.4 million DKK for Tristesse Blanche) and for the highest amount raised in a single auction in Denmark (30 million DKK in total).

== See also ==
- School of Paris
