= Shinkichi Tajiri =

American sculptor

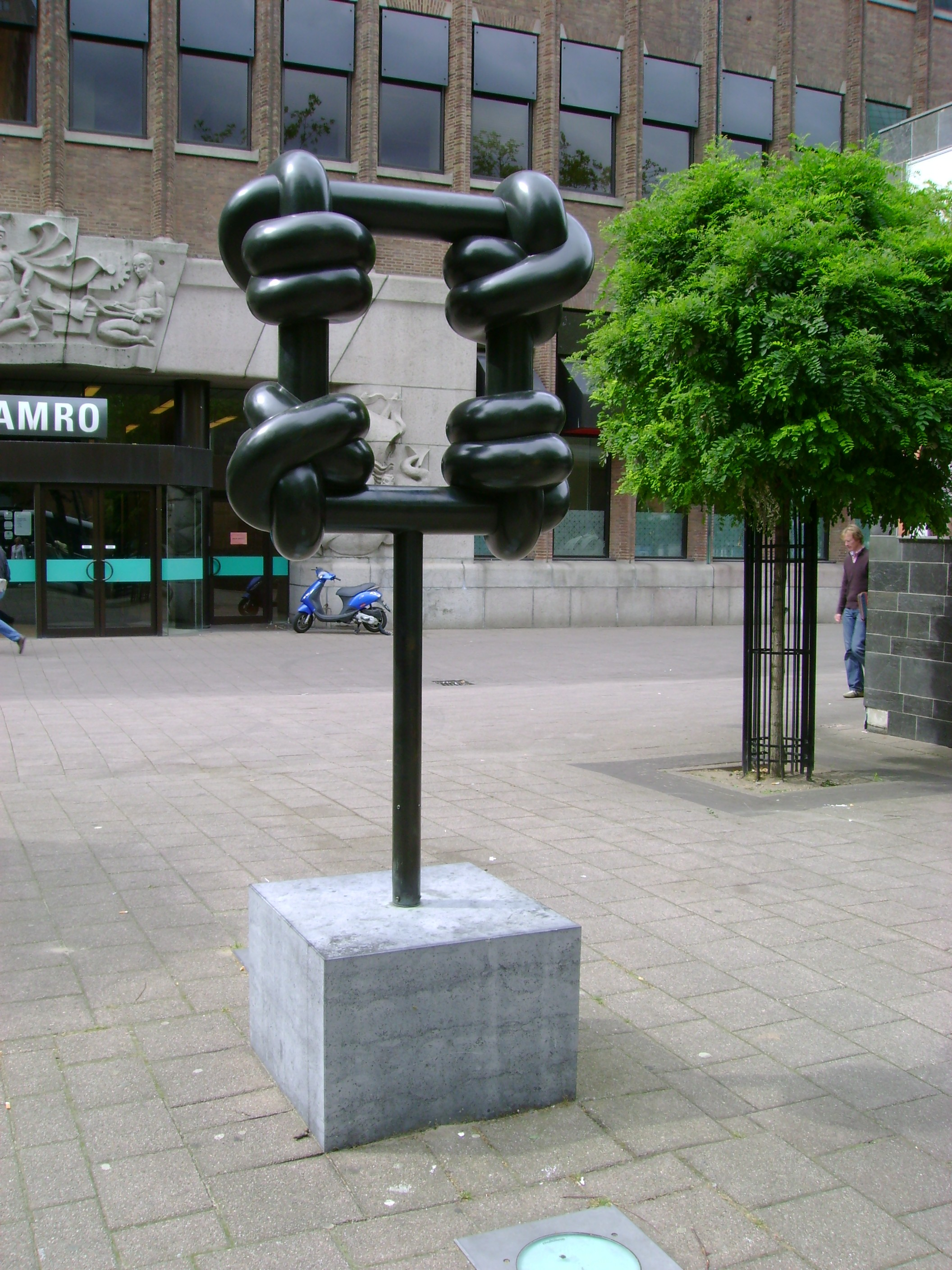
The Knot (1976), Rotterdam

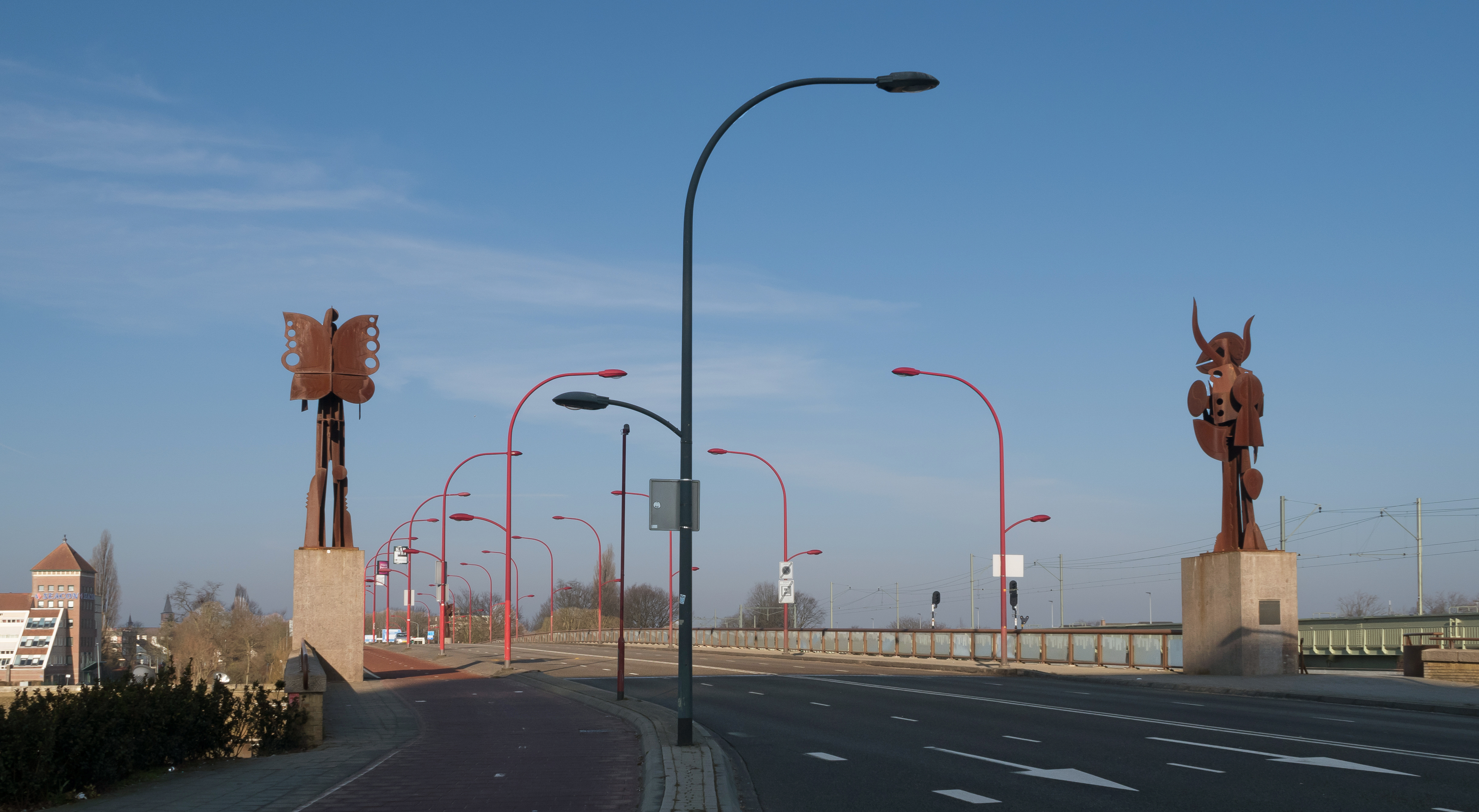
Twee Brugwachters, Venlo

Shinkichi Tajiri (Japanese: 田尻 慎吉, Los Angeles, December 7, 1923 – Baarlo, Netherlands, March 15, 2009) was an American sculptor who resided in the Netherlands from 1956 onwards. He was also active in painting, photography and cinematography.

== Childhood and education ==
A Japanese American, Tajiri was born in Watts, a working-class neighborhood of Los Angeles. He was the fifth of seven children born to Ryukichi Tajiri and Fuyo Kikuta, first generation emigrants (issei), who moved from Japan to the United States in 1906 and 1913.

In 1936, the family relocated to San Diego. His father died when he was fifteen. In 1940, Tajiri received his first lessons in sculpture from Donal Hord.

== Life and work ==
In 1942, following the signing of Executive Order 9066, Tajiri's family was incarcerated at Poston War Relocation Center in Arizona. Tajiri was a soldier, with the 442nd Regimental Combat Team, like his brother Vincent. They fought in Europe, from 1943 on and he was wounded in Italy. Shinkichi went back to Chicago to study at the Art Institute from 1946 to 1948.

In 1949 he went to Paris to study with Ossip Zadkine and then Fernand Léger. Tajiri's niece, Rea Tajiri, is a video artist and filmmaker, whose 1991 documentary History and Memory: For Akiko and Takashige, includes a letter explaining his move to Europe due to a loss of "faith in the American Constitution, and it is for that reason that I left the U.S....a year after I returned from the war." He met Karel Appel and Corneille in Paris and shows at the 1949 COBRA exhibition at the Stedelijk Museum, Amsterdam. In 1951 he went to Germany and taught at the Werkkunstschule Wuppertal. In 1955 he won a Golden Palm at Cannes, for his first short film, The Vipers, because of his experimental use of the language of film. From 1956 he lived in the Netherlands, since 1962 in Baarlo. He worked as a sculptor and painter. He exhibited at the famous Kassel documenta II, 1959; III, 1964 and IV, 1968. From 1969 Tajiri Shinkichi taught at the Hochschule für Bildende Künste at Berlin. 1969 and 1970 Shinkichi took pictures of every part of the Berlin Wall. In 1970 he went to Denmark and directed the award-winning documentary Bodil Joensen – en sommerdag juli 1970 about Bodil Joensen. In 1975 and 1976 he recreated the Daguerreotype: surreal portraits, nudes and daguerreotypes of the Wall.

== Catalogues ==
- Spiegel mit Erinnerungen, Shiunkichi Tajiris Wiederentdeckung der Daguerreotypie. Exhibition, catalogue, Künstlerhaus Bethanien: Berlin, editor, 1977
- Stereoscopic Views by Tajiri, Exhibition, catalogue, Stedelijk Museum: Amsterdam, editor, 1979
