= Bram Bogart =

Dutch born (1921) Belgian 1969) expressionist painter (1921–2012)

- Born: 12 July 1921; Delft, the Netherlands
- Died: 2 May 2012 (aged 90); Sint-Truiden, Belgium
- Occupation: Belgian painter
- Movement: Expressionism, Excessivism

Bram Bogart (12 July 1921, Delft – 2 May 2012, Sint-Truiden) was a Belgian expressionist painter associated with the COBRA group.

== Early life and education ==
Abraham van den Boogaart was born in Delft, the Netherlands, the son of Abraham van den Boogaart, a blacksmith. He attended a technical school, and trained for a career as a decorator, while taking a correspondence class in drawing.

== Career ==
Following his education Bogart took a job with an advertising concern in Rotterdam. Subsequent to World War Two the then twenty-five-year-old painter settled in Paris, France, where he was among the founders of Art Informel. At first he experimented with cubism and figurative drawing, depicting flowers, still life and self-portraits. In the 1950s he began to concentrate on working with impasto. With thick layers of boldly applied and colourful paint, he developed an expressionist style which became more abstract with time.

In 1961 he and his later to be wife Leni permanently relocated to Belgium and in 1969 he became a Belgian citizen. Here he began to experiment with a more three-dimensional medium, a mix of mortar, siccative, powdered chalk, varnish, and raw pigment, applied to large, heavy wooden backing structures.

Bogart exhibited frequently in Antwerp and Ghent. In 1971 he represented Belgium at the Venice Biennale.

In 2011 the Bogart presented an exhibition in celebration of his 90th birthday, a display of his Monochrome paintings, held at the Bernard Jacobson Gallery in London. A retrospective of his work was also exhibited at Galerie Jean-Luc and Takako Richard in Paris. Bogart died on 2 May 2012 in Sint-Truiden, Belgium, at the age of 90.
