= Christian Dotremont =

Belgian artist

- Born: 12 December 1922; Tervuren, Belgium
- Died: 20 August 1979 (aged 56); Buizingen, Belgium
- Occupations: painter, poet
- Known for: founding member of COBRA

Christian Dotremont, (French pronunciation: [kʁistjɑ̃ dɔtʁəmɔ̃]; 12 December 1922 – 20 August 1979), was a Belgian painter and poet who was born in Tervuren, Belgium. He was a founding member of the Revolutionary Surrealist Group (1946) and he also founded COBRA together with Danish artist Asger Jorn. In this capacity he was responsible for bringing Henri Lefebvre's Critique de la vie quotidienne (1946) to the group's attention. He later became well known for his painted poems (French: Peinture mots), which he called logograms.

He died of tuberculosis in Buizingen.

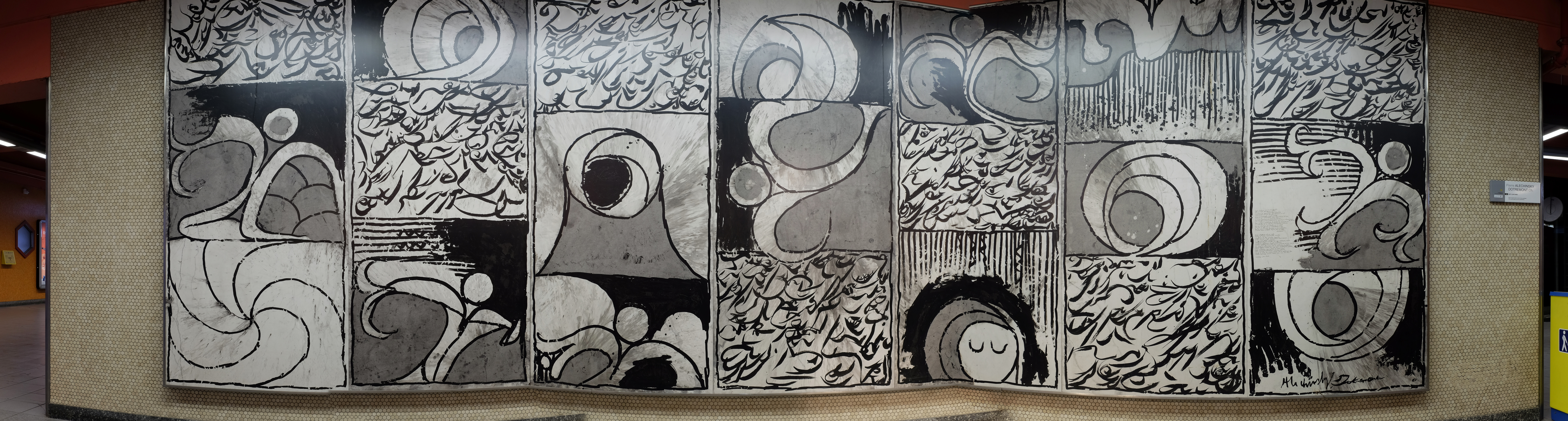
Sept Ecritures by Dotremont and Alechinsky (in colour)

== Bibliography ==
- Labisse (1946)
- Les jambages au cou (1949)
- Cobra 1948 - 1951 - with an introduction by Christian Dotremont, (1980, Jean-Michel Place)
- Cartes et lettres : correspondance 1966-1979 (1986)
