= Eugène Brands =

Dutch painter

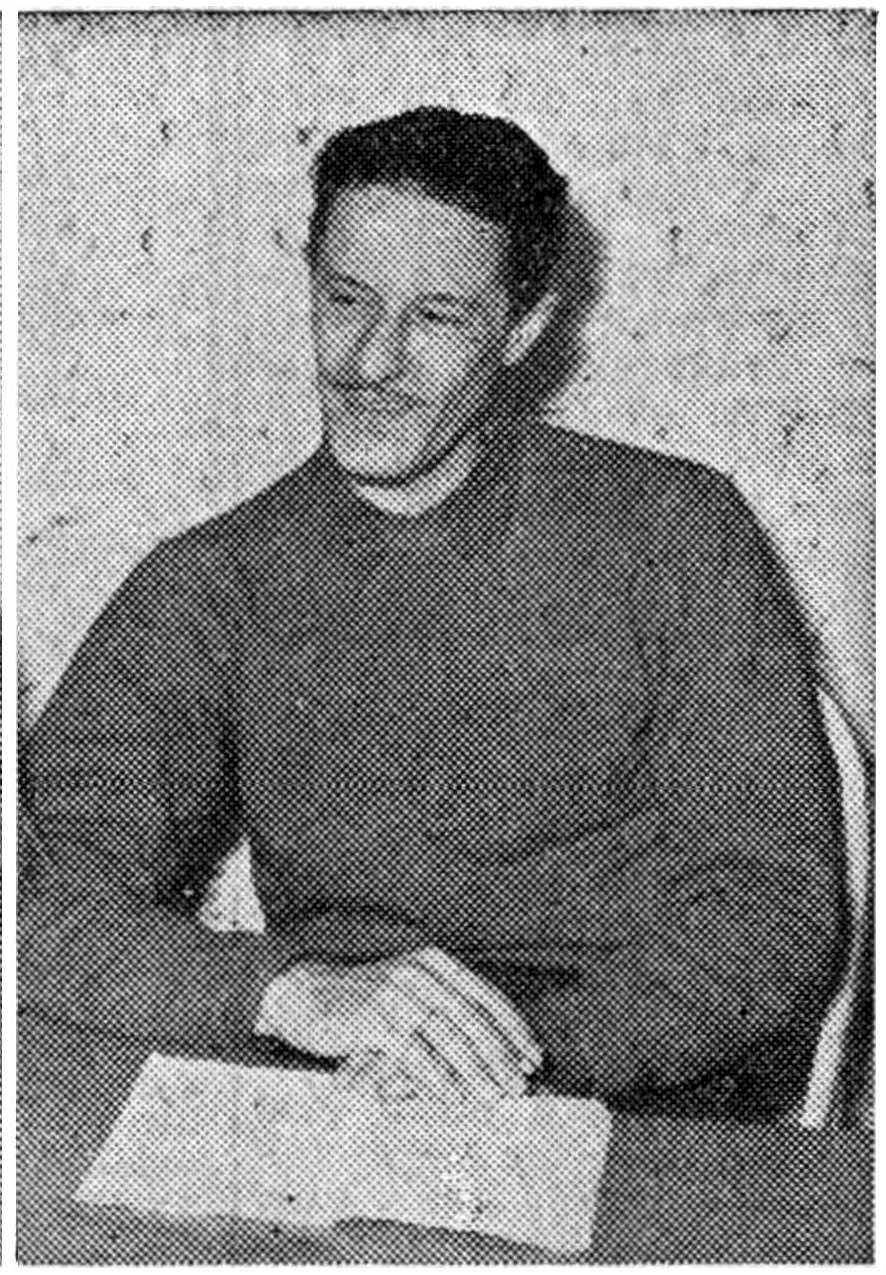
Portrait of Eugène Brands, 1952

Eugène Brands (January 15, 1913 - January 15, 2002 in Amsterdam) was a Dutch painter, an early member of the COBRA avant-garde art movement.

In 1946, Eugène Brands participated in the group exhibition "Young Painters" in the Stedelijk Museum in Amsterdam, where a whole room was filled with his work. In 1948 he joined the Experimental Group Holland, and in November 1949 he showcased his artwork in the "International exhibition of experimental art". Meanwhile, the Experimental Group became one of the founders of the Cobra movement, and he was one of the artists contributing to the founding statement in the group's art magazine Reflex. However, differences of opinion and disagreements resulted in his departure and he decided to go solo. In the 1950s he was inspired by children's drawings.

Today his work is often showcased at the Museum Jan van der Togt.
