= Corneille Guillaume Beverloo =

Dutch artist

Corneille
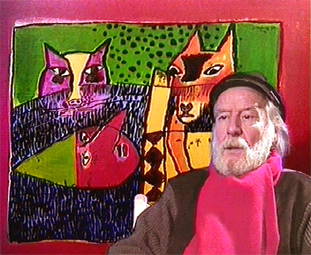
- Born: Cornelis Guillaume van Beverloo; 3 July 1922; Liège, Belgium
- Died: 5 September 2010 (aged 88); Auvers-sur-Oise, France
- Movement: COBRA

Corneille – Guillaume Cornelis van Beverloo (3 July 1922 – 5 September 2010), better known under his pseudonym Corneille, was a Dutch artist.

Corneille was born in Liège, Belgium, although his parents were Dutch and moved back to the Netherlands when he was 12. He studied art at the Academy of Art in Amsterdam, in the Netherlands. He was one of the founders of the REFLEX movement in 1948 and in 1949 he was also one of the founders of the COBRA movement, which has had great influence on Scandinavian art. He was active within the group from the beginning, not only painting but also publishing poetry in the Cobra magazine. He was a cofounder of the Experimentele Groep in Holland. Corneille was inspired by the drawings of children, and believed in the importance of approaching children with art that connects with their experience. When he heard during a Cobra Museum visit in the nineties that there was an “Art Lending for Children” he talked with the founder Roby Bellemans and asked him to send more information to his home in Paris about this project. He decided to promote the initiative. He started with a support list and persuaded other artists such as Shinkichi Tajiri to sign.

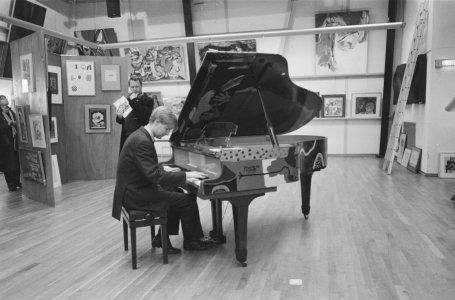
Piano painted by Corneille photographed at auction sale on Christies viewing day in 1987

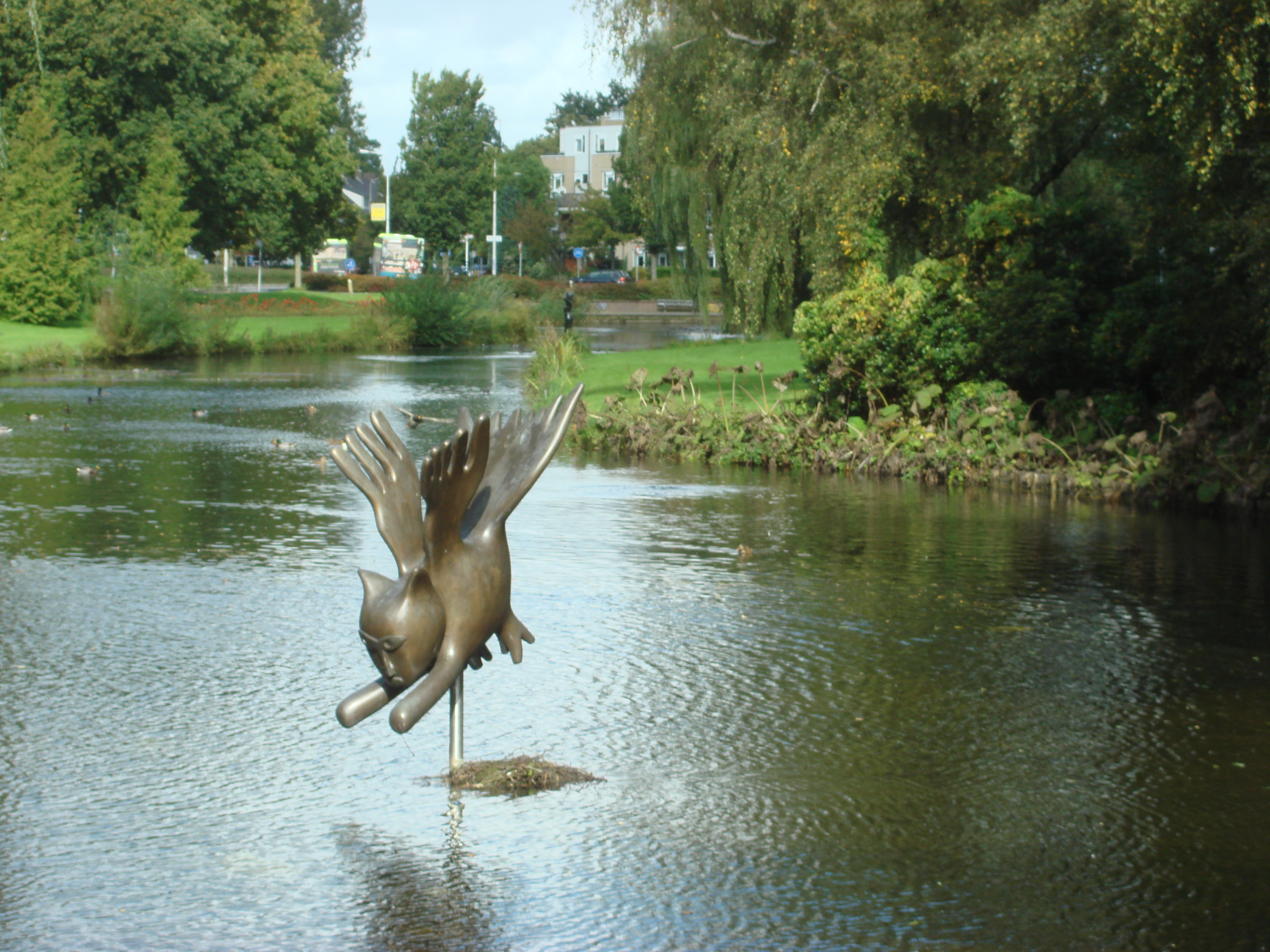
Statue De Vliegende Kat by Corneille in the pond behind the Cobra Museum in Amstelveen

The poetic Corneille was strongly influenced by Miró and Klee. After the group dissolved in 1951 he moved to Paris and began collecting African art. These artifacts became evident in his works, which began to take on a more imaginative style, like landscapes seen from a bird's eye view, exotic birds and stylised forms. His work is in the collection of the Centre Georges Pompidou.

Until his death Corneille lived and worked in Paris, and made visits to Israel where he worked with the Jaffa Atelier.

On 24 September 2003 an exhibition of his prints opened at the Ramat Gan Museum of Israeli Art, Israel. He died at Auvers-sur-Oise, France.
