= Lucebert =

Dutch painter

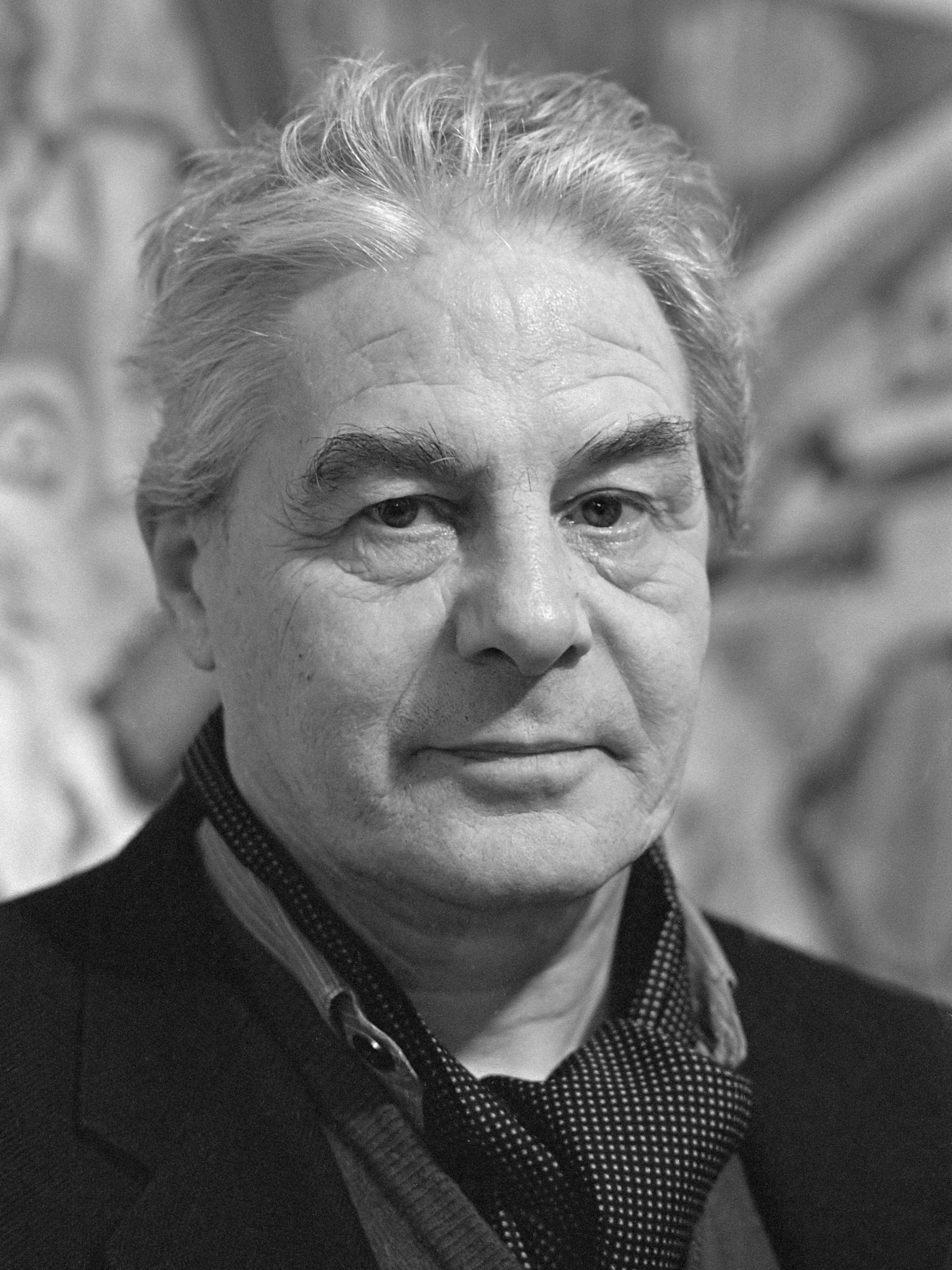
- Lucebert in 1987
- Born: Lubertus Jacobus Swaanswijk; 15 September 1924; Amsterdam, Netherlands
- Died: 10 May 1994 (aged 69); Alkmaar, Netherlands
- Known for: Poetry, painting
- Movement: COBRA

Lubertus Jacobus Swaanswijk (15 September 1924 – 10 May 1994), known professionally as Lucebert (Dutch: [ˈlysəbɛrt]), was a Dutch artist who first became known as the poet of the COBRA movement.

He was born in Amsterdam in 1924. He entered the Institute for Arts and Crafts in 1938 and took part in the first exhibition of the COBRA group at the Stedelijk Museum in 1949.

== Biography ==
Lucebert's talent was discovered when he started working for his father after school. After half a year of art school, he chose to be homeless between 1938 and 1947. In 1947, a Franciscan convent offered him a roof over his head, in exchange for a huge mural painting. Because the nuns could not appreciate his work, they had it entirely painted over with white paint.

He belonged to the Dutch literary movement of De Vijftigers, which was greatly influenced by the European avant-garde movement COBRA. Lucebert's early work especially shows this influence, and his art in general reflects a rather pessimistic outlook on life.

His strong personality appealed to many. As a poet he laid foundation for revolutionary innovation in Dutch poetry.

Most of his poems were collected in Gedichten 1948–1965. After this period of composing poetry, he worked primarily in the visual arts known as figurative-expressionist from the 1960s. His work is being translated to English on collected works.

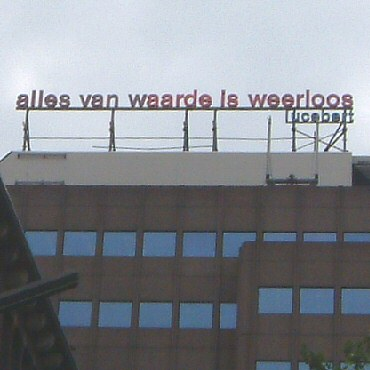
Lucebert's sentence "Alles van waarde is weerloos" ("All things of value are helpless") on a building in Rotterdam

Well known is his line "Alles van waarde is weerloos" from the poem De zeer oude zingt ("The very old one sings"). The adjective "weerloos" means "defenseless", "unable to defend oneself", so the meaning is "All things of value are defenseless". This line was put on top of the office building of an insurance company in Rotterdam (near the Blaak station) in neon letters, including his name, sometime in the 1980s or earlier. It wasn't the first but is certainly the most prominent commercial use of the line; today three more buildings in the area display it on their walls. Similarly, written on the city's central library just across the street is "Heel de wereld is mijn vaderland – Erasmus", "All the world is my fatherland – Erasmus".

Attracted by the Mediterranean light and the vibrant community of Dutch artists, Lucebert and his wife Tony Swaanswijk moved to Altea, Spain in 1963, before eventually settling in Jávea in 1968, where they found both a home and a space for artistic creation. In 1973, in the Lluca district of Jávea, they bought a house which also served as Lucebert's studio, became a significant site for the creation of numerous works that showcased his creativity and talent.

Lucebert's strong connection with Spain was further solidified through his close relationship with artist and art collector Antonio Pérez. This relationship led to a permanent exhibition of Lucebert's work in Cuenca, Spain. Following Lucebert's death, his widow, Tony, made a significant donation to the Antonio Pérez Foundation in Cuenca. This donation included a room dedicated to Lucebert, intended to exhibit part of the donated works, thereby preserving and showcasing Lucebert's artistic legacy in Spain.

Lucebert died on 10 May 1994 in Alkmaar, Netherlands.

Lucebert was also a noted anti-apartheid activist.

== Exhibitions ==
- 1949 – International Exhibition of Experimental Art, Stedelijk Museum, Amsterdam, Netherlands
- 1959 – Stedelijk Museum, Amsterdam, Netherlands
- 1959 – Documenta, Kassel, Germany
- 1959 – First Paris Biennale, Paris, France
- 1959 – Vitalita nell’Arte, Venice, Italy
- 1961 – Stedelijk van Abbe-Museum, Eindhoven, Netherlands
- 1961 – International Exhibition of Contemporary Painting and Sculpture, Carnegie International, Pittsburgh, PA, USA
- 1963 – Staedtlische Kunstgalerie, Bochum, Germany
- 1963 – Marlborough New London Gallery, London
- 1964 – Museum Boymans-van Beuningen, Rotterdam; Kunsthalle Baden-Baden
- 1964 – Documenta 111, Kassel, Germany
- 1969 – Stedelijk Museum, Amsterdam
- 1969 – Kunsthalle Basel, Switzerland – with Karel Appel and Tajiri
- 1977 – Stedelijk Museum, Amsterdam, Netherlands
- 1977 – Galería Juana Mordó, Madrid, Spain
- 1982 – Kunsthalle, Mannheim, Germany
- 1983 – Kunstverein Hochrhein, Bad Säckingen, Germany
- 1984 – Stedelijk Museum, Amsterdam, Netherlands
- 1985 – Rai, Kunstmesse Amsterdam, Netherlands
- 1987 – Stedelijk Museum, Amsterdam, Netherlands
- 1988 – Kunstmuseum Winterthur, Kunstverein Freiburg i.Br., Germany
- 1988 – Landesmuseum Oldenburg, Galerie im Taxispalais, Innsbruck, Austria
- 1989 – Kunsthalle zu Kiel, Germany
- 1989 – Städtische Kunstgalerie, Bochum, Germany
- 1989 – Kunsthaus Grenchen, Grenchen, Switzerland
- 1996 – Después de Goya Art Exhibition, Zaragoza, Spain
- 2000 – IVAM, Valencia, Spain
- 2001 – Lucebert Room (Standing Collection), Fundación Antonio Pérez, Cuenca, Spain

== Awards ==
- 1954 – Prize for literature from the city of Amsterdam
- 1959 – "Mediterranean Prize" of the Paris Biennale
- 1962 – 2nd "Marzotto Prize"
- 1964 – "Carlo Cardazzo" prize at the 32nd Biennale in Venice, Italy
- 1965 – "Constantijn Huygensprijs"
- 1967 – "P.C. Hooftprijs" – the highest Dutch Governmental prize for literature
- 1983 – "Prijs der Nederlandse Letteren" for Dutch literature

== Public collections ==
Among the public collections holding works by Lucebert Swaanswijk are:

- Museum de Fundatie, Zwolle
