= Karel Appel =

Dutch painter, sculptor, and poet (1921–2006)

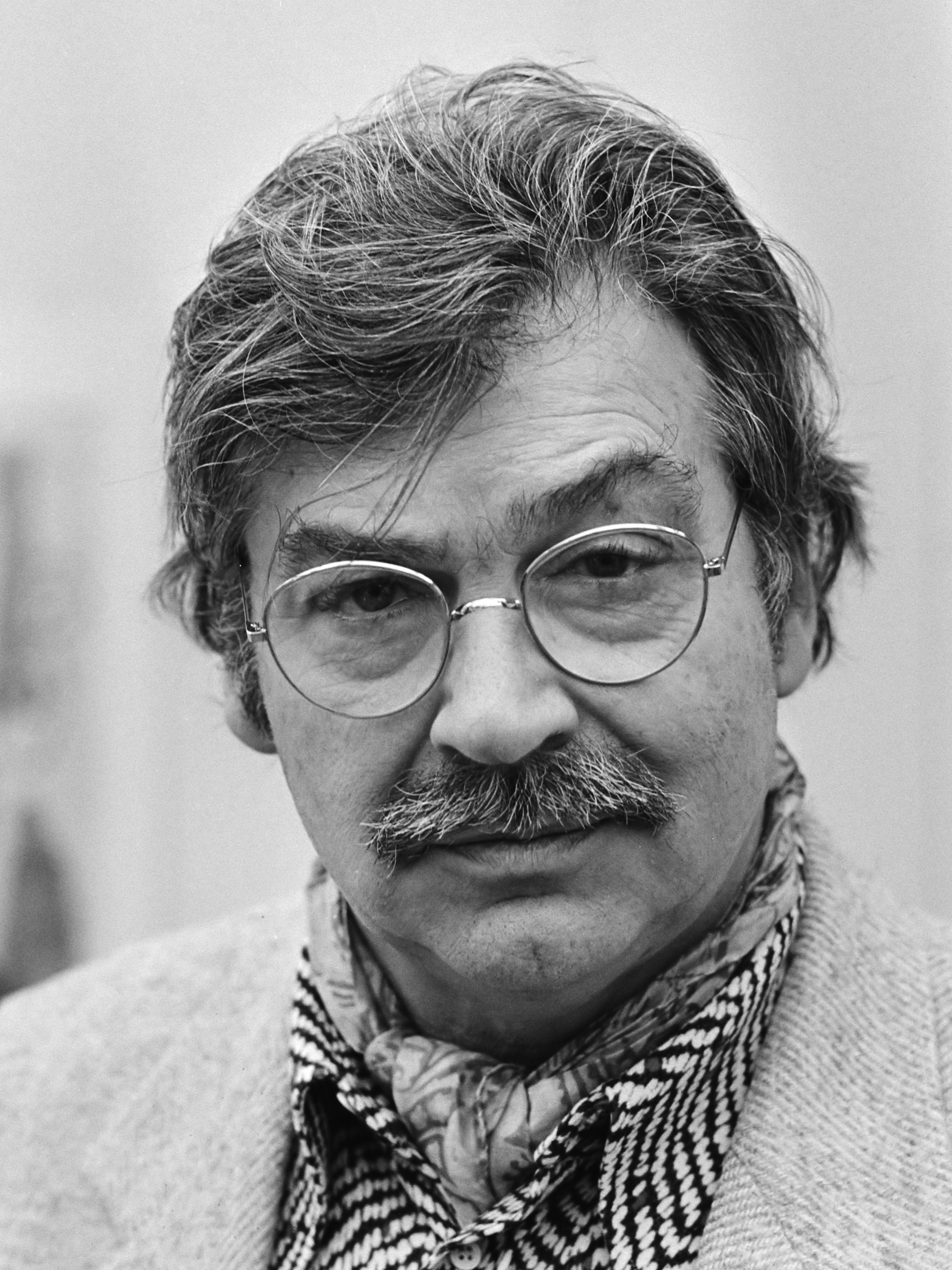
- Appel in 1982
- Born: Christiaan Karel Appel; 25 April 1921; Amsterdam, Netherlands
- Died: 3 May 2006 (aged 85); Zürich, Switzerland
- Education: Rijksakademie
- Known for: Painting, drawing, sculpture, wall-painting
- Movement: CoBrA

Christiaan Karel Appel (pronounced [ˈkrɪstijaːŋ ˈkaːrəl ˈɑpəl]; 25 April 1921 – 3 May 2006) was a Dutch painter, sculptor, and poet. He started painting at the age of fourteen and studied at the Rijksakademie in Amsterdam in the 1940s. He was one of the founders of the avant-garde movement CoBrA in 1948. He was also an avid sculptor and has had works featured in MoMA and other museums worldwide.

== Childhood ==
Christiaan Karel Appel was born on 25 April 1921 in his parents' house at Dapperstraat 7 in Amsterdam, the Netherlands. As a child he was often called 'Kik'. On the ground floor his father, Jan Appel, had a barbershop. His mother, born Johanna Chevallier, was a descendant of French Huguenots. Karel Appel had three brothers.

At fourteen, Appel produced his first real painting on canvas, a still life of a fruit basket. For his fifteenth birthday, his wealthy uncle Karel Chevalier gave him a paint set and an easel. An avid amateur painter himself, Chevalier gave his namesake some lessons in painting.

== Career ==
From 1940 to 1943, during the German occupation, Appel studied at the Rijksakademie van Beeldende Kunsten in Amsterdam, and it was there he met the young painter Corneille and, some years later, Constant; they became close friends for years. His parents opposed his choice to become an artist, leading him to leave home; this was also necessary because he needed to hide from the German police so that he would not be picked up and sent to Germany to work in the weapons industry. Appel had his first show in Groningen in 1946. In 1949 he participated with the other CoBrA artists in the Stedelijk Museum Amsterdam; this generated a huge scandal and many objections in the press and public. He was influenced by Pablo Picasso, Henri Matisse, and the French brute-art artist Jean Dubuffet. In 1947 he started sculpting with all kinds of used materials (in the technique of assemblage) and painted them in bright colors: white, red, yellow, blue, and black. He joined the Experimentele Groep in Holland together with the young Dutch painters Anton Rooskens, Theo Wolvecamp, and Jan Nieuwenhuys. Later the Belgian writer Hugo Claus joined the group.

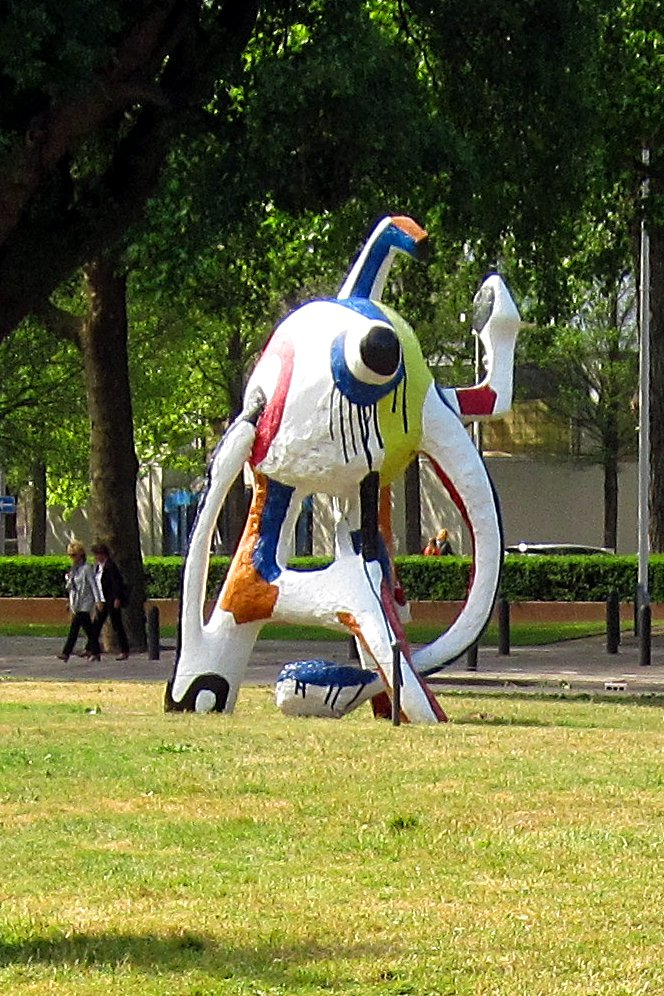
The Elephant, now located at the University of Maryland

In 1948 Appel joined CoBrA (coined by the Belgian poet Christian Dotremont from the initials of the members' home countries' capital cities: Copenhagen, Brussels, Amsterdam) together with the Dutch artists Corneille, Constant, and Jan Nieuwenhuys. The new art of the CoBrA group was not popular in the Netherlands, but it found a warm and broad welcome in Denmark. By 1939, Danish artists had already started to make spontaneous art and one of their sources of inspiration was Danish and Nordic mythology. It was also in Denmark that the CoBrA artists started cooperating by collectively painting the insides of houses, which encouraged and intensified the exchange of the typical 'childish' and spontaneous picture language used by the CoBrA group. Appel used this very intensively; his 1949 fresco 'Questioning Children' in Amsterdam City Hall caused controversy and was covered up for ten years.

As a result of this controversy and other negative Dutch reactions to CoBrA, Appel moved to Paris in 1950 and developed his international reputation by travelling to Mexico, the United States, Yugoslavia, and Brazil. He also lived in New York City and Florence. His first American gallery exhibition took place in 1954 at the Martha Jackson Gallery. In America he also painted portraits of prominent jazz musicians, including Miles Davis and Dizzy Gillespie. The following year his painting Child and Beast II (1951) was included in the influential exhibition, The New Decade at the Museum of Modern Art which featured the work of twenty-two European painters and sculptors including newcomers like Francis Bacon, Jean Dubuffet, and Pierre Soulages. He is particularly noted for his mural work. After 1990 he became much more popular in the Netherlands; he had several big shows in Amsterdam and Bruxelles, organized by director Rudy Fuchs. Also, the CoBrA-museum in Amstelveen organized several shows featuring his work. He became the most famous Dutch CoBrA artist.

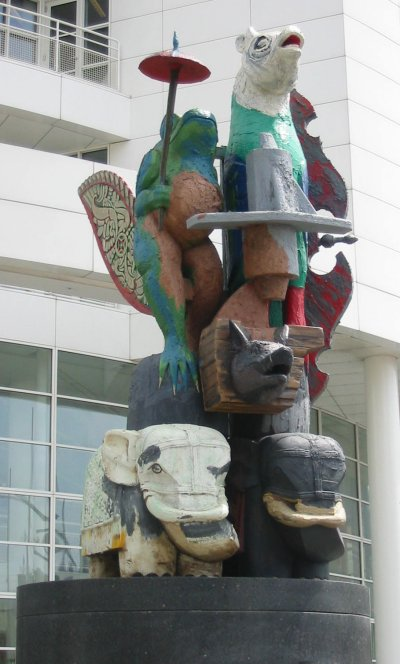
Frog with umbrella (2001) at the Spui in The Hague

Appel's work has been exhibited in a number of galleries, including the Anita Shapolsky Gallery in New York City, Galerie Lelong in Paris, Galerie Ulysses in Vienna, and Gallery LL in Amsterdam. He also had multiple exhibitions of his works in the Cobra Museum in Amstelveen, Netherlands. His estate is represented by Galerie Max Hetzler and Almine Rech.

From 16 January–16 May 2016 the Kunstmuseum Den Haag exhibited Karel Appel: A Retrospective of Appel’s paintings, sculptures, and drawings. From 18 June–18 September 2016, The Phillips Collection exhibited Karel Appel: A Gesture of Color Paintings and Sculptures, 1947–2004, with works from Appel’s long career. In 2016-2017 there were also exhibits of Appel’s works in the Staatliche Graphische Sammlung in Munich and Musée d’Art Moderne de la Ville de Paris.

== Death ==
Appel died on 3 May 2006 in his home in Zürich, Switzerland. He suffered from a heart ailment. He was buried on 16 May 2006 at the Père Lachaise Cemetery in Paris, France.

Years before his death, Appel established the Karel Appel Foundation, whose purpose is "to preserve [Appel's] artworks, to promote public awareness and knowledge of Karel Appel's oeuvre, and to supervise publication of the Oeuvre Catalogue of the paintings, the works on paper, and the sculptures."

In 2002 a number of Appel's works went missing on the way to his foundation, an event that was not to be resolved before his death. However, in 2012 the works were found in a disused UK warehouse and returned to the foundation.

In the wake of his death, the Foundation (based in Amsterdam) functions as his official estate in addition to its primary service as an image archive. The U.S. copyright representative for the Karel Appel Foundation is the Artists Rights Society.

== Gallery ==
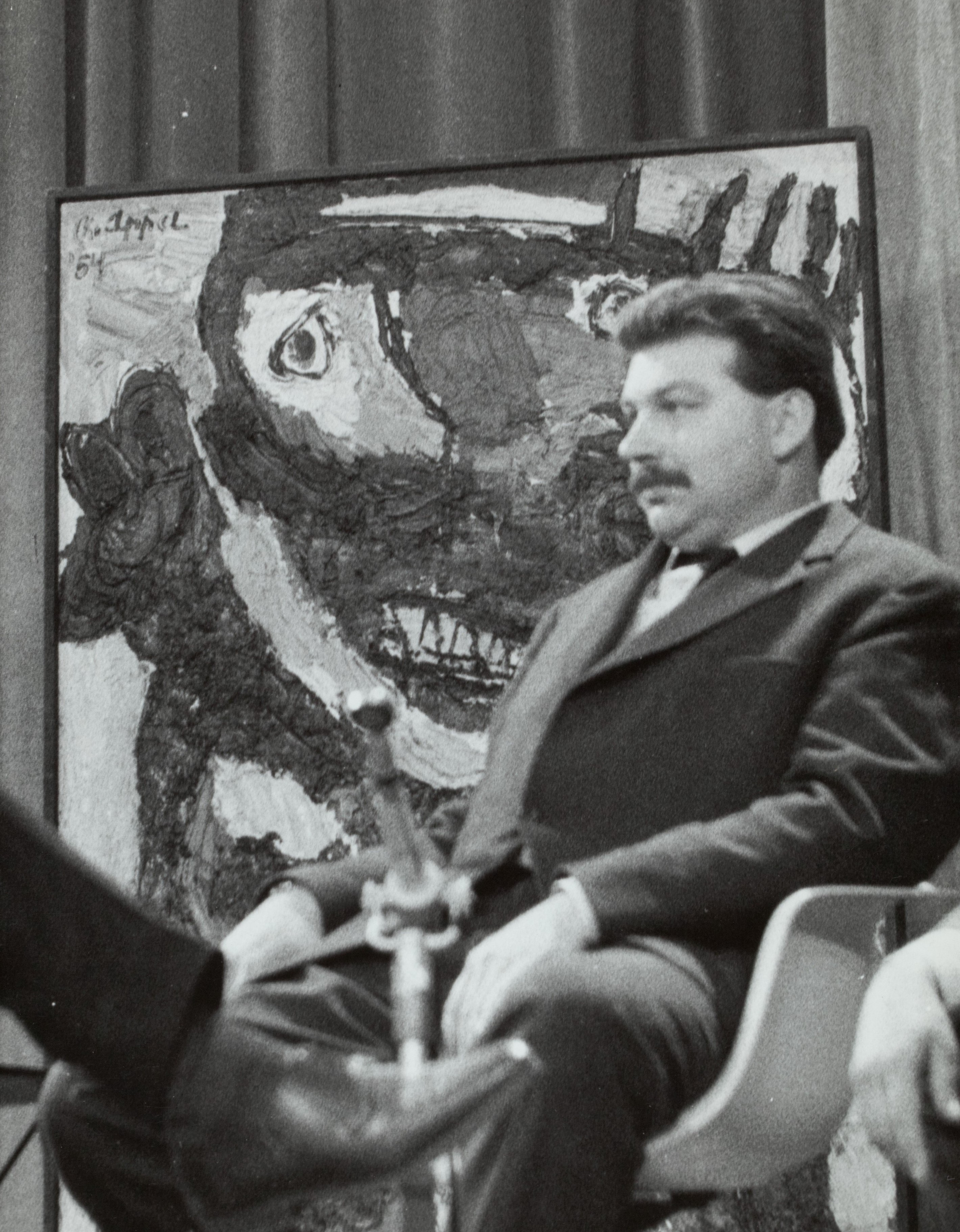
'Portrait of Appel with his painting', 1954

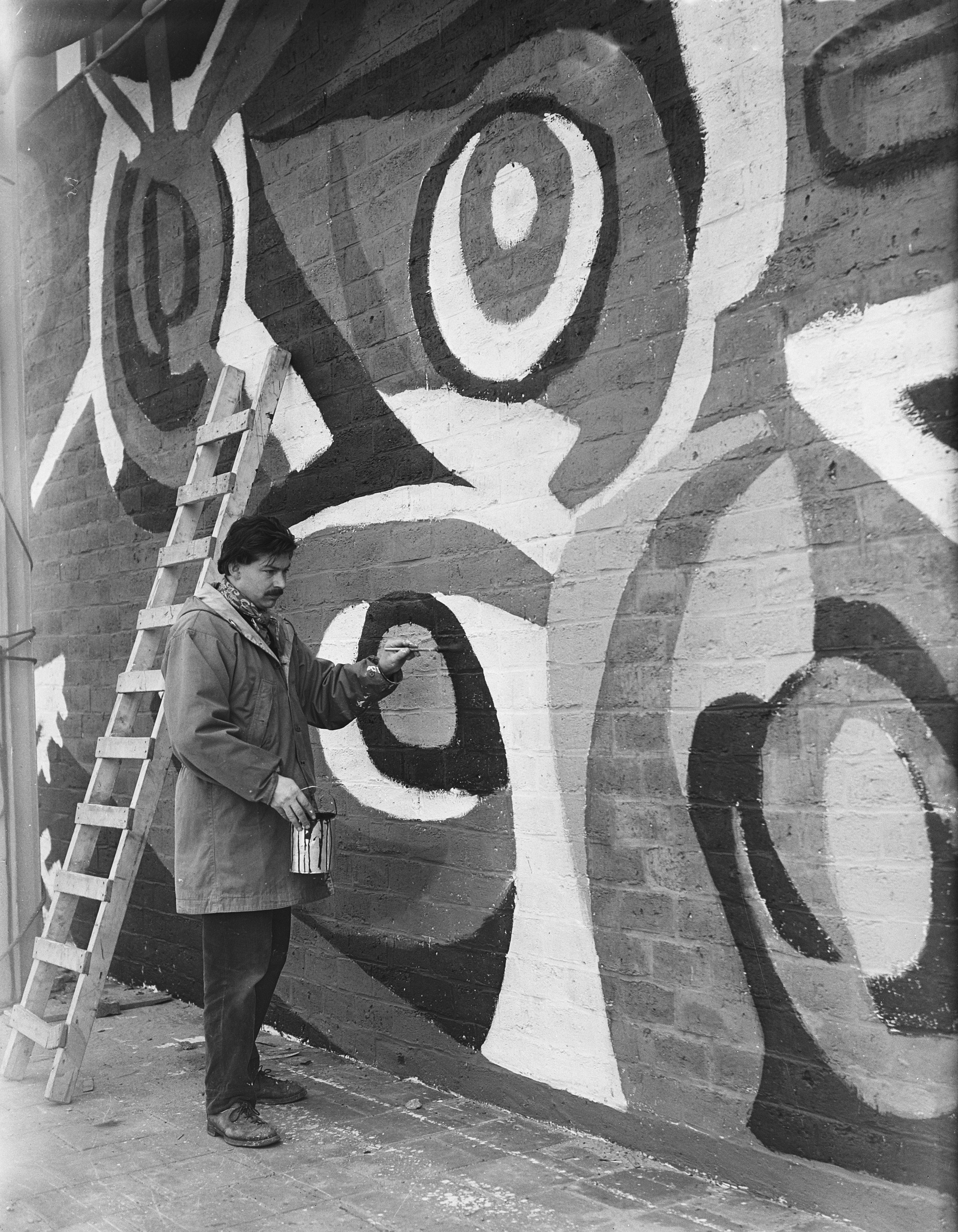
'Karel Appel, making a wall-painting in Rotterdam', 1955

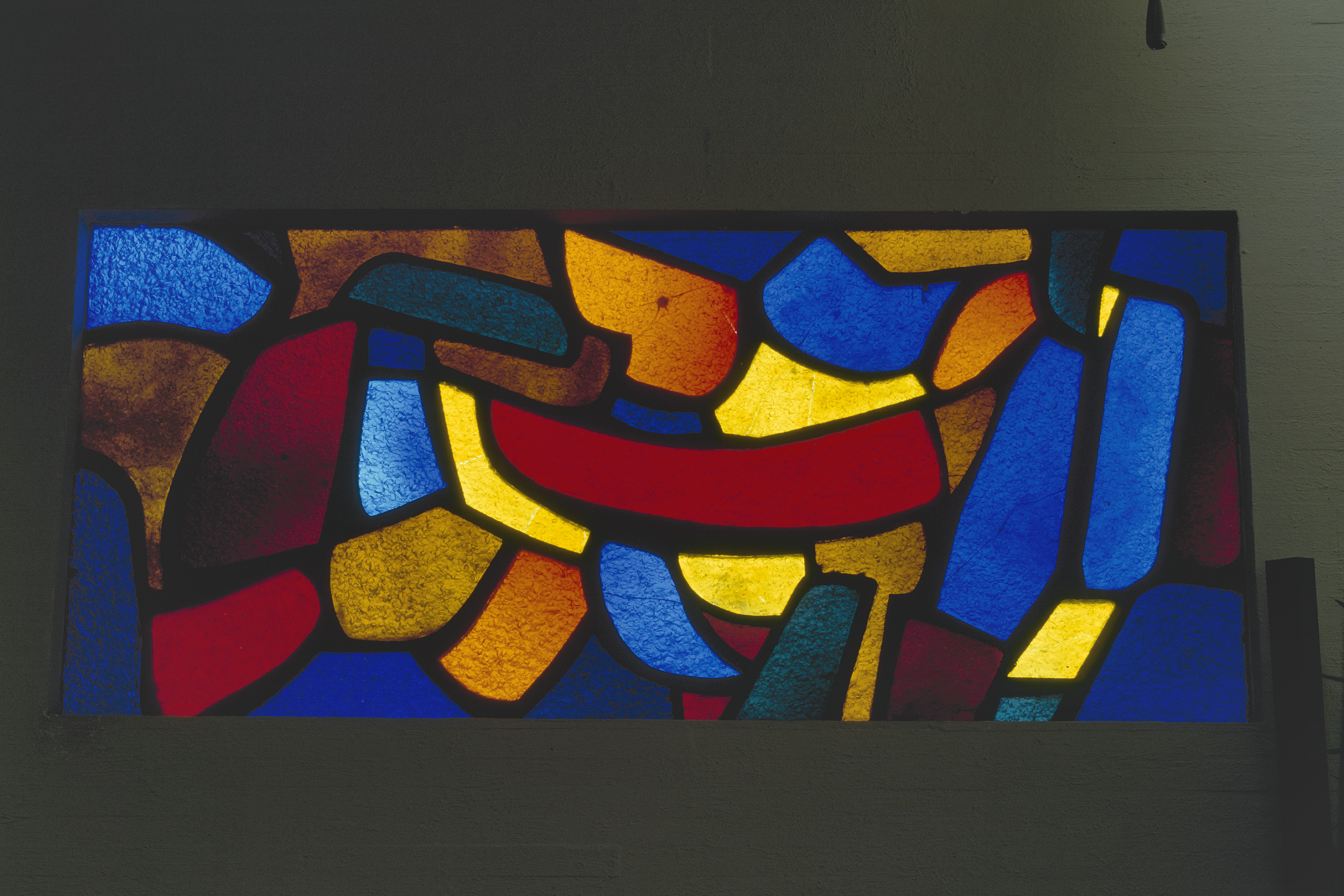
'Window in the Kruiskerk, church in Geleen, 1957; colored stained glass

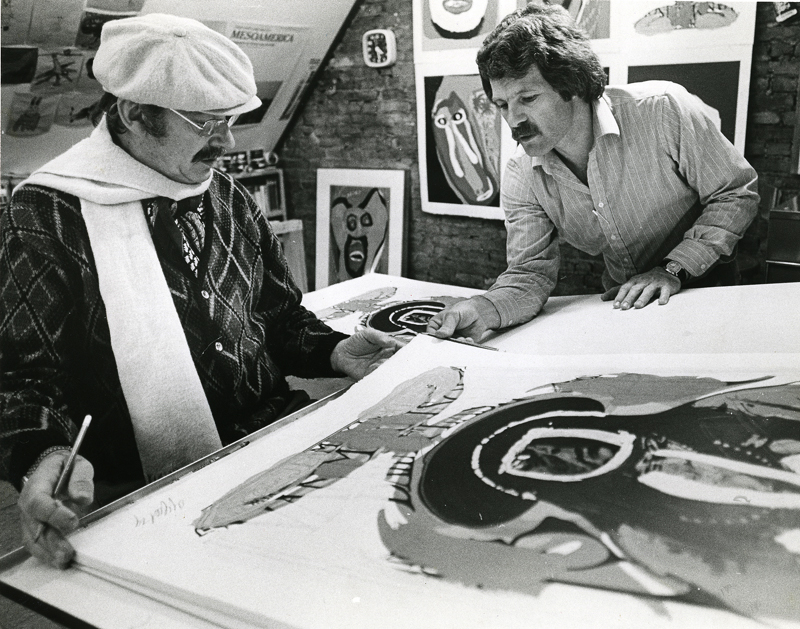
Karel Appel, 1979; signing his prints

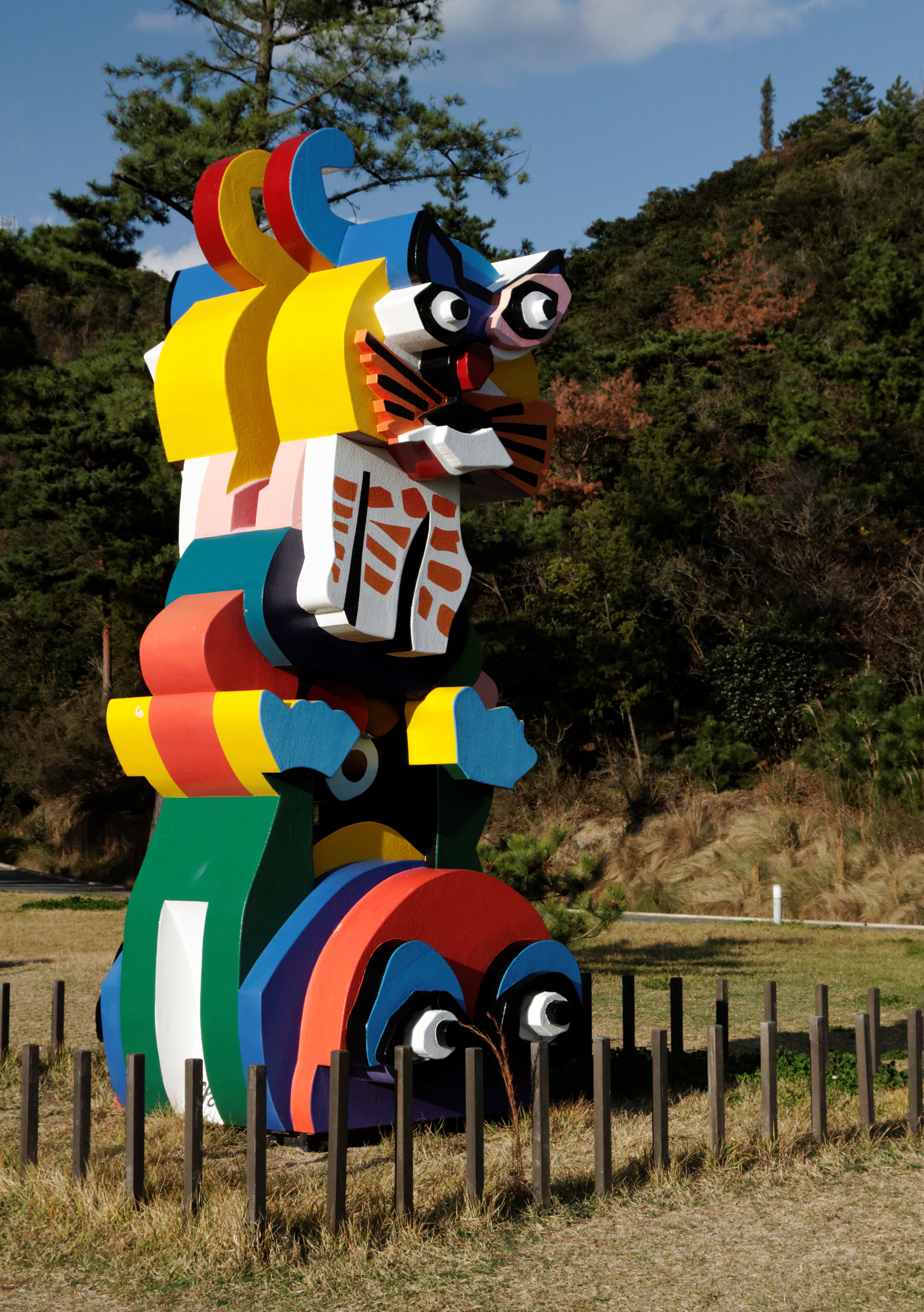
'Frog and Cat', 1990; sculpture at Naoshima

== Tributes ==
"Karel Appel" is the name of a song by art-rock band Poem Rocket from the 2000 record "Psychogeography".

== Public collections ==
Among the public collections holding works by Karel Appel are:

- Museum de Fundatie, Zwolle, The Netherlands
- Aboa Vetus & Ars Nova, Turku, Finland
- Art Gallery of Hamilton, Ontario, Canada
- Rijksmuseum, Amsterdam, The Netherlands
- The Phillips Collection, Washington D.C., US
- Collezione Peggy Guggenheim, Venice
- Didrichsen Art Museum, Helsinki
- Kunsthalle Bremen, Bremen
- Musée National d'Art Moderne, Centre Georges Pompidou, Paris
- Musée d'Art Moderne de la Ville de Paris (Palais Tokyo), Paris
- Museum Ludwig, Cologne
- Museum Moderner Kunst, Vienna
- Neue Nationalgalerie, Berlin
- San Francisco Museum of Modern Art, San Francisco
- Stanford University Museum of Art, Stanford
- Stedelijk Museum Amsterdam, Amsterdam
- Tate Modern, London
- The Museum of Modern Art, New York
- Gallery Delaive, Amsterdam, the Netherlands
- Frances Lehman Loeb Art Center, Poughkeepsie, NY, US
- Art Museum of Southeast Texas, Beaumont, Texas
- McClung Museum of Natural History and Culture, Knoxville, Tennessee

== Bibliography ==
- Appel, Karel: Psychopathological Notebook. Drawings and Gouaches 1948–1950. Bern – Berlin: Verlag Gachnang & Springer, 1999. ISBN 978-3-906127-57-6
