= Eckersberg Medal =

Annual award of the Royal Danish Academy of Fine Arts

The Eckersberg Medal (originally the Akademiets Aarsmedaille or Annual Academy Medal) is an annual award of the Royal Danish Academy of Fine Arts. It is named after Christoffer Wilhelm Eckersberg, known as the father of Danish painting.

The Eckersberg Medal was created in 1883, on the 100th birthday of its namesake.

== Eckersberg Medal recipients ==
Source (1940 onwards): Akademiraadet

=== 1880s ===
Year	Recipient(s)	Field
1887	Michael Ancher	Painter
1887	Christian Blache	Painter
1888	Christian Blache	Painter
1888	Valdemar Irminger	Painter
1889	Michael Ancher	Painter
1889	Valdemar Irminger	Painter

=== 1890s ===
Year	Recipient(s)	Field
1890	Georg Achen	Painter
1890	Erik Henningsen	Painter
1890	Edvard Petersen	Painter
1890	Theodor Philipsen	Painter
1891	Edvard Petersen	Painter
1892	Ludvig Brandstrup	Sculptor
1892	Joakim Skovgaard	Painter
1893	H. A. Brendekilde	Painter
1893	Niels Pedersen Mols	Painter
1893	Laurits Tuxen	Painter
1894	Niels Pedersen Mols	Painter
1894	Knud Larsen	Painter
1894	Hans Ole Brasen	Painter
1895		
1896	Ludvig Brandstrup	Sculptor
1896	Gunnar Jensen	Medallist/sculptor
1896	L.A. Ring	Painter
1897		
1898	Heinrich Wenck	Architect
1898	Lauritz Jensen	Sculptor
1898	Knud Larsen	Painter
1899	Peter Ilsted	Painter

=== 1900s ===
Year	Recipient(s)	Field
1900	Rasmus Andersen	Sculptor
1900	Carl Bonnesen	Sculptor
1901	Martin Borch	Architect
1901	Thorvald Jørgensen	Architect
1901	Lorenz Vilhelm Hinrichsen	Painter
1901	Carl Holsøe	Painter
1901	L.A. Ring	Painter
1901	Carl Wentorf	Painter
1902	Gotfred Tvede	Architect
1902	Carl Wentorf	Painter
1903	Anna Ancher	Painter
1903	Hans Nikolaj Hansen	Painter
1903	Carl Locher	Painter
1903	Carl Mortensen	Painter
1903	Henrik Jespersen	Painter
1904	Anna Ancher	Painter
1904	Victor Nyebølle	Architect
1904	Niels Vinding Dorph	Painter
1904	Edvard Eriksen,	Sculptor
1904	Viggo Jarl	Sculptor
1904	Carl Locher	Painter
1905	Lauritz Jensen	Painter
1905	Charles Lindstrøm	
1905	Hans Smidth	Painter
1906	Hans Smidth	Painter
1906	Agnes Slott-Møller	Painter
1907	Carl Brummer	Architect
1907	Niels Vinding Dorph	Painter
1907	Vilhelm Arnesen	
1907	Frederik Lange	Painter
1907	J.C. Schlichtkrull	Painter
1908	Gotfred Tvede	Architect
1908	Carl Holsøe	Painter
1908	Ejnar Nielsen	Sculptor
1908	Ingeborg Plockross Irminger	Sculptor
1908	Peter Alfred Schou	Painter
1908	Herman Vedel	Painter
1908	Sigurd Wandel	Painter
1909	Anton Rosen	Architect
1909	Josef Theodor Hansen	Painter/illustrator
1909	Johannes Magdahl Nielsen	Architect
1909	Carl V. Meyer	
1909	Herman Vedel	Painter
1909	Carl Mortensen	

=== 1910s ===
Year	Recipient(s)	Field
1910	Axel Berg	Architect
1910	Jens Jacob Nielsen Bregnø	Sculptor
1910	Hans Nikolaj Hansen	Painter
1910	Frederik Lange	
1910	Johannes Wilhjelm	Painter
1911	Carl Brummer	Architect
1911	Vilhelm Th. Fischer	
1911	Lorenz V. Hinrichsen	
1911	Carl V. Meyer	
1911	Einar Utzon-Frank	Sculptor
1911	Johannes Wilhjelm	
1912	Vilhelm Th. Fischer	
1912	Svend Hammershøi	Painter/ceramist
1912	Gunnar Jensen	Medallist/sculptor
1912	P.A. Schou	
1912	Sigurd Wandel	
1913	Carl Møller	Painter/Architect
1913	Svend Hammershøi	Painter/ceramist
1914	Rasmus Harboe	Sculptor
1914	Kristoffer Varming	Architect
1914	Axel Poulsen	Sculptor
1914	Eiler Sørensen	Painter
1915	Henning Hansen	Architect
1915	Eiler Sørensen	Painter
1915	Valdemar Neiiendam	Painter
1916	Thyra Boldsen	Sculptor
1916	Hans Knudsen	Painter
1917	Hans Knudsen	Painter
1918	Maleren Tycho Jessen	Painter
1918	Carl Harild	Architect
1919	Knud Kyhn	Painter(ceramist/sculptor
1919	Karl Larsen	Painter
1919	Jens Lund	Painter/illustrator
1919	Sigurd Swane	Painter

=== 1920s ===
Year	Artist	Medium
1920	FilePoul Holsøe	Architect
1920	Jens Lund	Painter
1921	Axel Ekberg	Architect
1921	Niels Hansen	Painter
1921	Hans Henningsen	Painter
1922	Carl Fischer	Painter
1923	Emanuel Monberg	Architect
1923	Niels Bjerre	
1923	Kræsten Iversen	Painter
1923	Svend Jespersen	Sculptor
1924	Olaf Rude	Painter
1924	William Scharff	Painter
1925	Edvard Weie	Painter
1926	Kay Fisker	Architect
1926	Axel P. Jensen	Painter
1926	Ernst Zeuthen	Painter
1927	Johannes Ottesen	Painter
1927	Knud V. Engelhardt	Architect
1927	Kay Fisker	Architect
1928	Ludvig Find	Painter
1928	Kaare Klint	Architect
1928	Hans W. Larsen	Painter
1929	Bent Helweg-Møller	Architect
1929	Jais Nielsen	Painter/ceramist

=== 1930s ===
Year	Recipient	Field
1930	Thorkild Henningsen; Mogens Bøggild; Ebba Carstensen	Architect; Sculptor; Painter
1931	Johan Vilhelm Andersen; Jens Søndergaard; Poul Andreas Kiærskou	Painter; Painter; Sculptor
1932		
1933	Oluf Høst; Einar Packness; Arno Malinowski; Siegfred Neuhaus	Painter; Architect; Sculptor; Painter
1934	Harald Quistgaard; Kaj Søren Sørensen; Harald Hansen	Sculptor; Painter; Painter
1955	Thomas Havning	Architect
1936	Arne Jacobsen; Aage Rafn; Adam Fischer; Georg Jacobsen; Herluf Jensenius; Arnoff Thomsen	Architect; Architect; Sculptor; Painter; Illustrator; Sculptor
1937	Gudmund Nyeland Brandt; Niels Lergaard	Landscape architect Painter
1938	Mogens Koch; Axel Salto; Knud Agger	Architect; Sculptor; Painter
1939	Egil Fischer; Poul Høm; Sigurjón Ólafsson; Johannes Hansen	Architect; Painter; Painter; Sculptor; Sculptor

=== 1940s ===
Year	Recipient	Field
1940	Henrik Starcke; Astrid Noack; Flemming Larsen; Erik Møller; Lauritz Hartz; Søren Hjorth Nielsen	Sculptor; Sculptor; Architect; Architect; Painter; Painter
1941	Aage Petersen; Gunnar Hansen; Vilhelm Lauritzen; Frits Schlegel; Otto Nielsen; Victor Haagen Müller	Sculptor; Sculptor; Architect; Architect; Painter; Painter
1942	Hugo Liisberg; Anker Hoffmann; Elof Risebye; Niels Grønbech	Sculptor; Sculptor; Painter; Painter
1943	Aage Nielsen-Edwin; Agnes Lunn; Kaj Louis Jensen; Hans Christian Hansen; Viggo S. Jørgensen; Povl Schrøder; Christine Swane	Sculptor; Sculptor; Sculptor; Architect; Architect; Painter; Painter
1944	Knud Nellemose; Gottfred Eickhoff; Eske Kristensen; Axel Skjelborg; Carl Jensen	Sculptor; Sculptor; Architect; Painter; Painter
1945	Inge Finsen; Tyge Holm; C. F. Møller; C.Th. Sørensen; Arne Ludvigsen; Ole Søndergaard; Erik Hoppe	Sculptor; Architect; Architect; Architect; Architect; Architect; Painter
1946	Ulf Rasmussen; J. Gudmundsen-Holmgreen; F. Grut; Paul Sørensen; Sophie Pedersen	Sculptor; Sculptor; Architect; Painter; Painter
1947	Ejgill Vedel Schmidt; Finn Juhl; Júlíana Sveinsdóttir; Bizzie Høyer; Ville Jais Nielsen	Sculptor; Architect; Painter; Painter; Painter
1948	Tove Olafsson; Stephensen; Knud Hansen; Mogens Andersen; Svend Johansen; Lauritz Hartz	Sculptor; Architect; Painter; Painter; Painter; Painter
1949	August Keil; Agnete Jørgensen; Hans Georg Skovgaard; Edvard Klindt-Larsen; Egon Mathiesen	Sculptor; Sculptor; Architect; Architect; Painter

=== 1950s ===
Year	Recipient	Field
1950	Carl-Henning Pedersen; Richard Mortensen; Børge Mogensen	Painter; Painter; Architect
1951	Holger J. Jensen; Hans Bendix; Hans Hansen; Helge Refn; Henning Seidelin; Grethe Bagge	Painter; Painter; Architect; Architect; Sculptor; Sculptor
1952	Helge Nielsen; Dan Sterup-Hansen; P.E. Hoff; B. Windinge	Painter; Painter; Architect; Architect
1953	Kaj Mottlau; Petri Gissel; Halldor Gunnløgsson; Ole Hagen; William Gersel; Jørgen Thoms	Painter; Painter; Architect; Architect; Sculptor; Sculptor
1954	Mogens Zieler; Kaj Ejstrup; Viggo Møller-Jensen; Hjalte Skovgaard	Painter; Painter; Architect; Sculptor
1955	S. Danneskjold-Samsøe; Christian Daugaard; Eva & Nils Koppel	Painter; Painter; Architects
1956	Carl Østerbye; Erik Herløw; Hans J. Wegner	Painter; Architect; Architect
1957	Albert Gammelgaard; Karl Bovin; Jørn Utzon; Erik Christian Sørensen; Helge Holmskov	Painter; Painter; Architect; Architect; Sculptor
1958	Harald Leth; Holger Jensen; Vilhelm Wohlert	Painter; Architect; Architect
1959	Egill Jacobsen; Ole Kielberg; Jørn Nielsen; Jørgen Bo	Painter; Painter; Architect; Architect

=== 1960s ===
- 1960: Ejler Bille, Sven Havsteen-Mikkelsen, Henry Luckow-Nielsen
- 1961: Flemming Bergsøe, Jørgen Andersen Nærum
- 1962: Preben Hornung, Svend Engelund
- 1963: Anna Klindt Sørensen, Jeppe Vontillius
- 1964: Albert Mertz, Sig. Vasegaard
- 1965: Frede Christoffersen, Reidar Magnus, Erik Thommesen
- 1966: Søren Georg Jensen, Poul Bjørklund
- 1967: Poul Ekelund, Erling Frederiksen, Agnete Varming, Gunnar Westman
- 1968: Ib Braase, Agnete Bjerre
- 1969: Kjeld Hansen, Jørgen Haugen Sørensen, Willy Ørskov

=== 1970s ===
- 1970: Paul Gadegaard, Erling Jørgensen, Christian Poulsen
- 1971: Kasper Heiberg, Richard Winther
- 1972: Johannes Carstensen, Knud Hvidberg, Anna Thommesen (weaving), Sigrid Lütken, Jens-Flemming Sørensen
- 1973: Helge Bertram, Erik Lynge
- 1974: Henrik Buch, Rasmus Nellemann, Gert Nielsen
- 1975: Arne Haugen Sørensen, Egon Fischer
- 1976: Alfred Madsen, Niels Macholm
- 1977: Gunnar Aagaard Andersen
- 1978: Ib Geertsen, Poul Gernes, Jørn Larsen, Tage Stentoft
- 1979: Henning Damgård-Sørensen, Else Fischer-Hansen, Arne Ungermann, Eva Sørensen

=== 1980s ===
- 1980: Emil Gregersen, Niels Guttormsen, Børge Jørgensen, Bjørn Nørgaard
- 1981: Vera Myhre, Karin Nathorst Westfelt, Knud Munk
- 1982: Sven Hauptmann, Anders Kirkegaard, Franka Rasmussen, Anna Maria Lütken, Gudrun Steenberg
- 1983: Knud Hansen, Søren Kjærsgaard, Mogens Lohmann, Ole Sporring
- 1984: Mogens Jørgensen, Tonning Rasmussen, Hans Christian Rylander, Kurt Trampedach, Ole Christensen
- 1985: Seppo Mattinen, Elsa Nielsen, John Olsen, Agnete Therkildsen
- 1986: Jørgen Rømer, Arne Johannessen, Kirsten Lockenwitz, Ingálvur av Reyni, Hein Heinsen
- 1987: Nanna Hertoft, Frank Rubin
- 1988: Leif Lage, Finn Mickelborg, Hanne Varming, Mogens Møller
- 1989: Freddie A. Lerche, Gudrun Poulsen, Ole Heerup, Eiler Kragh, Peter Bonnén

=== 1990s ===
- 1990: Jørgen Boberg, Helle Thorborg, Thomas Bang
- 1991: Jens Birkemose, Stig Brøgger, Torben Ebbesen
- 1992: Kai Lindemann, Per Neble
- 1993: Ingvar Cronhammar
- 1994: Peter Brandes, Otto Lawaetz, Inge Lise Westman, Kirsten Dehlholm
- 1995: Merete Barker, Troels Wörsel, Jørgen Roos (film), Kirsten Ortwed
- 1996: Erik A. Frandsen, Sys Hindsbo, Bent Karl Jacobsen, Aksel Jensen, Kehnet Nielsen, Lene Adler Petersen, Kirsten Justesen, Thorbjørn Lausten
- 1987: Erik Hagens, Karin Birgitte Lund, Eric Andersen, Margrete Sørensen
- 1998: Henrik Have, Frithioff Johansen, Jytte Rex, Christian Lemmerz
- 1999: Jesper Christiansen, Peter Lautrop, Ane Mette Ruge, Elisabeth Toubro

=== 2000s ===
Year	Recipient(s)	Field
2000	Per Arnoldi	Painter
2000	Nina Sten-Knudsen	Painter
2000	Mogens Otto Nielsen	Painter
2000	Georg K. S. Rotne	Architect
2000	Morten Stræde	Sculptor
2001	Jes Fomsgaard	Painter
2001	Michael Kvium	Painter
2001	Ole Helweg	Architect
2001	Ole Helweg	Architect
2001	Knud Fladeland Nielsen	Architect
2001	Kim Utzon	Architect
2001	Lone Høyer Hansen	Sculptor
2001	Anita Jørgensen	Sculptor
2002	Viera Collaro	Painter
2002	Nils Erik Gjerdevik	Painter
2002	Stig Lennart Andersson	Landscape architect
2002	Søren Robert Lund	Architect
2002	Øivind Nygård	Sculptor
2002	Finn Reinbothe	Sculptor
2003	Peter Bonde	Artist
2003	Mogens Gissel	Painter
2003	Nille Juul-Sørensen	Architect
2003	Torben Schønherr	Landscape architect
2003	Eva Koch	Sculptor
2004	Jeppe Aagaard Andersen	Landscape architect
2004	Dorte Mandrup	Architect
2004	Martin Erik Andersen	Sculptor
2004	Olafur Eliasson	Sculptor
2004	Søren Jensen	Sculptor
2004	Claus Carstensen	Painter
2004	Leif Kath	Painter
2005	Bjarke Ingels	Architect
2005	Julien De Smedt	Architect
2005	Steen Høyer	Architect
2005	Jørgen Michaelsen	Sculptor
2005	Henning Christiansen	sculptor
2005	Ellen Hyllemose	Sculptor
2005	Tal R	Painter
2005	Per Bak Jensen	Painter
2005	Vibeke Mencke Nielsen	Painter
2006	Jytte Høy	Sculptor
2006	Erland Knudssøn Madsen	Sculptor
2006	Jørgen Carlo Larsen	Sculptor
2006	Peter Holst Henckel	Painter
2006	Malene Landgreen	Painter
2006	Signe and Christian Cold	Architects
2007	Troels Troelsen	Architect
2007	Jens Haaning	Sculptor
2007	Kerstin Bergendal	Sculptor
2007	Cai-Ulrich von Platen	Painter
2007	Poul Pedersen	Painter
2007	Per Marquard Otzen	Painter
2008	Karen Exner	Architect
2008	Mads Bjørn Hansen	Architect
2008	Mette Tony	Architect
2008	Henrik B. Andersen	Sculptor
2008	Sophia Kalkau	Sculptor
2008	Lilibeth Cuenca Rasmussen	Sculptor
2008	Kasper Bonnén	Painter
2009	Kim Holst Jensen	Architect
2009	Jesper Rasmussen	Sculptor
2009	Ole Broager	Sculptor
2009	Inge Ellegaard	Painter
2009	Leonard Forslund	Painter

=== 2010s ===
Year	Recipient(s)	Field	Ref
2010	Anna Maria Indrio	Architect	
2010	Thomas Carstens	Architect	
2010	Nils Holscher, Mikkel Nordberg, Claus Sivager	Architects	
2010	Peter Callesen	Visual artist	
2010	Kirsten Dufour and Finn Thybo Andersen	Visual artist	
2011	Louis Becker	Architect	
2011	Poul Ove Jensen	Architect	
2011	Erik Varming	Sculptor	
2011	Ursula Reuter Christiansen	Painter	
2012	Michael Elmgreen and Ingar Dragset	Visual artists	
2012	Marianne Levinsen	Landscape architect	
2012	Marianne Hesselbjerg	Visual artist	
2012	John Kørner	Painter	
2013	Kristine Jensen	Landscaåe architect	
2013	Frans Jacobi	Visual artist	
2013	Bodil Nielsen	Visual artist	
2013	Søren Martinsen	Visual artist	
2014	Frank Maali and Gemma Lalanda	Architects	
2014	Pernille Schyum Poulsen and Jan Albrechtsen	Architects	
2014	Jesper Just	Visual artist	
2014	Finn Naur Petersen	Sculptor	
2014	Kirstine Roepstorff	Visual artist	
2015	Carsten E. Holgaard	Architect	
2015	Christina Sofia Capetillo	Architect	
2015	Henrik Plenge Jakovsen	Visual artist	
2015	Ann Kristin Lislegaard	Visual artist	
2015	Mette Winckelmann	Visual artist	
2015	Lars Juel This, Ib Valdemar Nielsen, Bo Lautrup, Peter Dalgaard	Architects	
2016	Dan Stubbergaard	Architect	
2016	Peter Land	Visual artist	
2016	Joachim Koester	Visual artist	
2017	Terese Erngaard	Architect	
2017	Sergej Jensen	Visual artist	
2017	Hanne Nielsen (artist), Birgit Johnsen	Visual artists	
2017	Annette Harboe Flensburg	Visual artist	

=== 2020s ===
Year	Recipient(s)	Field
2020		
2020	Camilla Berner	Visual artist
2020	René Schmidt	Visual artist
2020	Mads Mandrup	Architect
2020	Søren Rasmussen	Architect

== See also ==
- List of European art awards
