= Hans Knudsen (painter) =

Danish painter

Hans Christian Martinus Kundsen (16 August 1865 – 6 January 1947) was a Danish artist. He is remembered principally for his landscape paintings mainly of the area of North Zealand which constituted his world of motifs.

== Biography ==
Knudsen was born in Roskilde, Denmark. He was the son of Martinus Knudsen (1831–88) and Johanne Cathrine Jensine Crone (1828–1904).

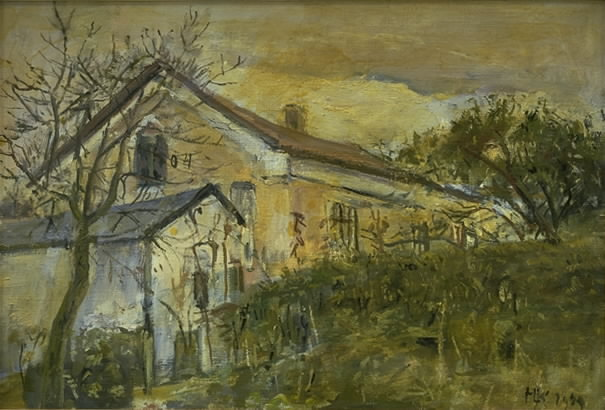
Forsamlingshuset i Slagslunde

He trained as a decoration painter in Odense with Carl Frederik Aagaard (1833–1895) from 1881 to 1884. From 1888 to 1896, he trained to the school operated by Kristian Zahrtmann (1843–1917). He exhibited regularly at the Charlottenborg Spring Exhibition from 1893 to 1946.

For many years Knudsen lived close to the forest edge of Ganløse Ore in Egedal, right on the border with Værløse in Furesø. He belonged to the group of painters called the Værløsemalerne with art frequently focused on the area of around Ganløse and Værløse. Knudsen was inspired by the picturesque perceptions and lyrical coloristic projections of Albert Gottschalk (1866–1906) and Laurits Andersen Ring (1854–1933).

He received the Eckersberg Medal in 1917, the Serdin Hansens Prize in 1919, the Alfred Benzon Prize in 1933, 1942 and the Thorvaldsen Medal in 1944. In 1909, he married Sørine Kristine Thomsen (1880–1964). He died during 1947 west of Ganløse at Slagslunde.
