= Christian Blache =

Danish marine painter

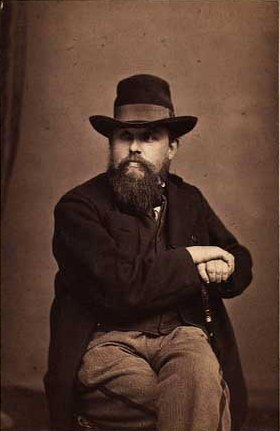
- Christian Blache, c. 1900
- Born: Christian Vigilius Blache; 1 February 1838; Aarhus, Denmark
- Died: 14 March 1920 (aged 82); Copenhagen, Denmark
- Education: Royal Danish Academy of Fine Arts

Christian Vigilius Blache (1838–1920) was a Danish marine painter. After studying at the Academy under C.F. Sørensen, he traveled widely painting ships and seascapes throughout Denmark as well as in Scotland, Iceland and the Faroe Islands. He was an early visitor to Skagen in the north of Jutland where an artists' colony was to emerge a little later.

== Early life and education ==
Blache was born in Aarhus, Denmark. He was the son of Hans Henrik Blache (1787-1871), the headmaster of Aarhus Katedralskole. After matriculating from high school in 1857, he first served an apprenticeship in shipbuilding. He entered the Royal Danish Academy of Fine Arts in 1861 where he studied under C.F. Sørensen, graduating in 1867. He traveled widely in Europe in 1872.

== Career ==
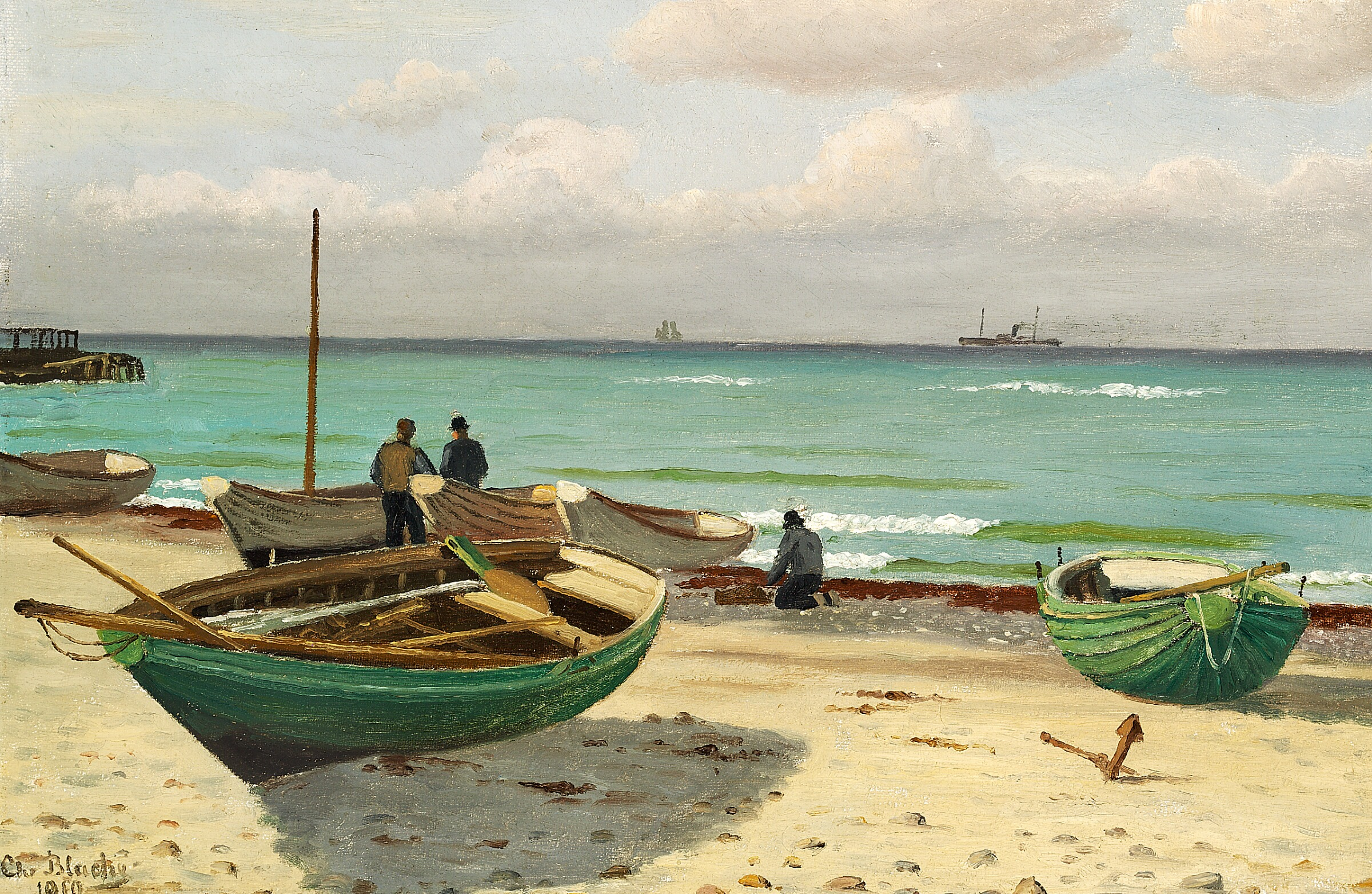
Marine med optrukne robåde på stranden (1910)

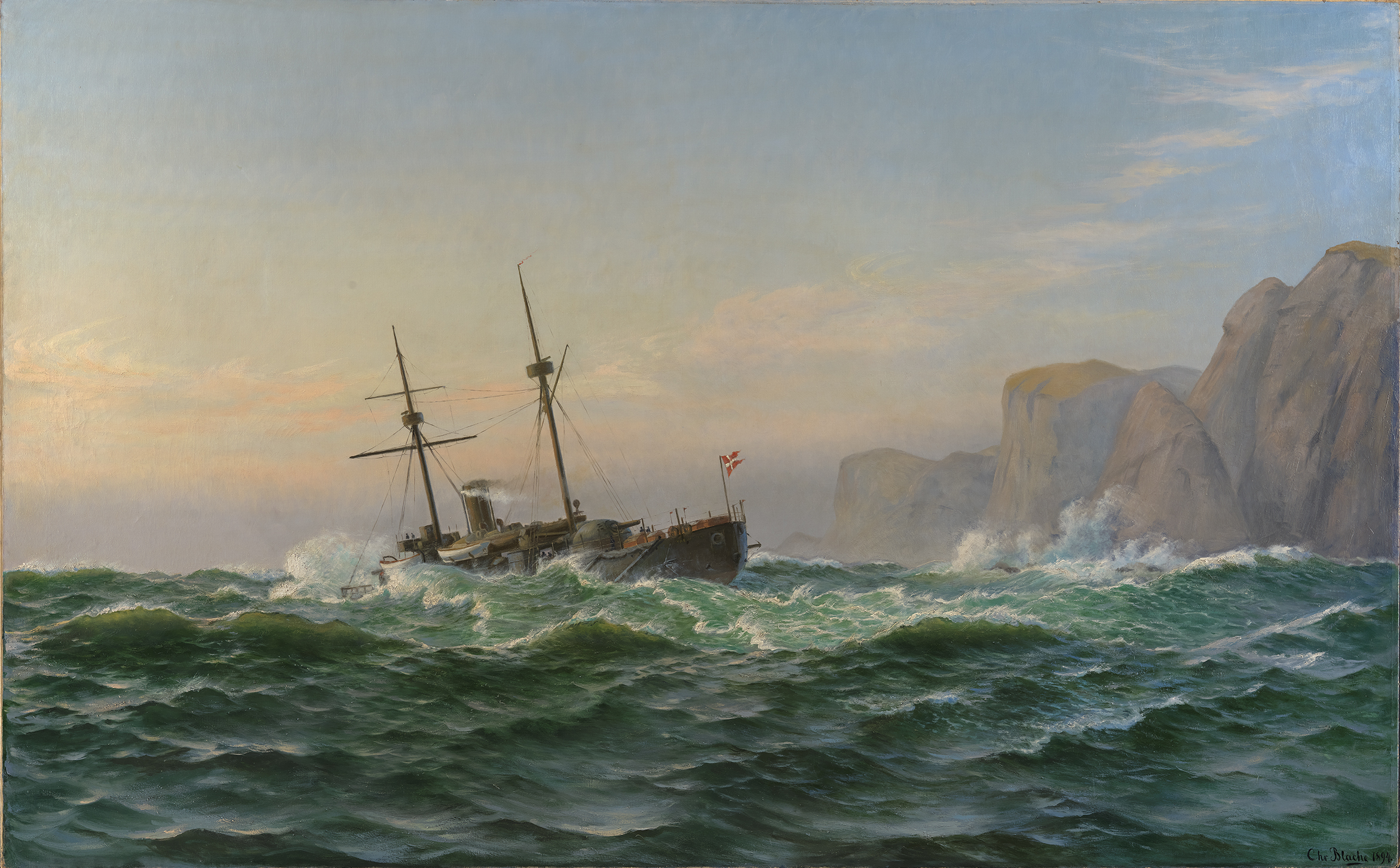
Panserskibet Ivar Huilfeldt passerer Forbjerget Stat i en Storm (1893)

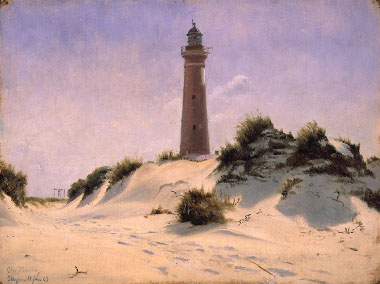
Skagens grå fyr (1869)

Blache belonged to the younger generation of Denmark's classical marine painters but had studied under one of the earlier masters, C.F. Sørensen. Like his colleagues, he had a good knowledge of ships and chose subjects mainly from home waters and coasts. He traveled through the whole of Denmark, painting many acclaimed works of the west coast of Jutland. Some of his more dramatic paintings depict scenes of stormy weather. He traveled to Paris in 1878 to see the paintings in the World Exhibition. His paintings include scenes of Skagen in Scotland, the Faroe Islands and Iceland.

From 1863, he exhibited in Charlottenborg and continued to do so almost every year until 1920, exhibiting over 200 paintings in all. He was awarded the Neuhausens Præmie in 1865 and 1872. In 1888, he was awarded the Eckersberg Medal. In 1888, Blache became a member of the Royal Danish Academy of Fine Arts plenary assembly. In 1890 he was elected to the academy board (akademirådet), from 1881–1914 he was a member of the exhibition committee and after 1907 he became its chairman. In 1888 he became a Knight of the Order of the Dannebrog, received the Dannebrogordenens Hæderstegn in 1904 and in 1914 was made Commander Second Class.

Among his most notable works on display at the National Gallery of Denmark are Fra Begtrupvig ved Hels (1864) and Panserskibet Ivar Huilfeldt passerer Forbjerget Stat i en Storm (1893).

== Skagen ==
Blache was one of the first artists to visit Skagen in the far north of Jutland where an artists' colony emerged in the late 1870s. It was as a result of his influence that Holger Drachmann first visited the town in 1871. One of Skagens Museum's most iconic paintings is his Skagens grå fyr (1869).

== Other sources ==
- Svanholm, Lise (2003). Skagenleksikon: malerne, modellerne, værkerne og stederne. Gyldendal A/S. pp. 27, 47, 57–. ISBN 978-87-02-01947-6.
