= Vera Myhre =

Danish painter and graphic artist

- Vera Eliasen
- Born: Vera Eliasen; July 25, 1920; Copenhagen, Denmark
- Died: June 22, 2000 (aged 79); Frederiksberg, Denmark
- Resting place: Solbjerg Park Cemetery, Frederiksberg
- Education: Royal Danish Academy of Fine Arts
- Known for: Painting, Graphic arts
- Notable work: Græsk suite (1959), Byen her og nu (1980), Jernbanehjul (1984)
- Spouse: Gert Peter Roseler Myhre (m. 1943)
- Parents: Oskar Eliasen (father); Eva Barham (mother)
- Awards: Eckersberg Medal (1981); Order of the Dannebrog (1981); Tagea Brandt Award (1983)

Vera Myhre née Eliasen (1920–2000) was a Danish painter and graphic artist. Her works can be seen in a number of museums and galleries, both in Denmark and abroad. She was the first woman to become president of the Royal Danish Academy of Fine Arts in 1975.

== Early life and education ==
Born on 25 July 1920 in Copenhagen, Vera Eliasen was the daughter of the wine merchant Oskar Eliasen (1892–1969) and Eva Barham (1891–1980). She began to draw as a child and from an early age hoped to become an artist. After completing her school education on Amager, she took private drawing lessons to prepare for the Royal Danish Academy of Fine Arts, where she studied from 1941 to 1944 under Aksel Jørgensen and Vilhelm Lundstrøm. On 11 July 1943, she married the architect Gert Peter Roseler Myhre (1919–1994).

== Career ==
She first exhibited as a painter at the Charlottenborg autumn exhibition in 1947 but became increasingly interested in the graphic arts. In collaboration with the Grafisk Kunstnersamfund (Graphic Arts Assiation), she exhibited at the Charlottenborg autumn exhibition in 1949. From 1951 to 1955, she studied graphic arts at the Royal Academy under Holger J. Jensen. Thereafter, she exhibited frequently in Denmark and abroad, including several solo exhibitions .

Myhre strove to improve conditions for Danish artists, becoming the first women to chair the Danish Painters Association (Malende Kunstneres Sammenslutning) from 1966 to 1968. From 1974 to 1990, she served on the board of the Danish Academy and in 1975, she became the first woman to serve as president of the Royal Danish Academy of Fine Arts. Thereafter she served as chair of the Academy's painters department and served on various other committees on art and culture.

As a graphic arts specialist, she taught at KADK, the Design and Conservation School, from 1981 to 1986, and at the Royal Academy's Graphic Arts School from 1986. She also wrote books and articles on the graphic arts, addressing various printing techniques including lithography, woodcarving and screen printing. Much of her own creative work was devoted to designing book covers and illustrations for magazines and pamphlets. Her graphic publications include Græsk suite (1959), her prize-winning Byen her og nu (1980) and Jernbanehjul (1984). Myhre's decorative work can be seen in Frederiksberg Town Hall and in DSB high-speed trains as well as in many museums and galleries.

Vera Myhre died on 22 June 2000 in Frederiksberg and is buried in Solbjerg Park Cemetery.

== Awards ==
Vera Myhre was honoured with many awards including the Eckersberg Medal and the Order of the Dannebrog, both in 1981, and the Tagea Brandt Award in 1983.
