= Carl Holsøe =

Danish artist

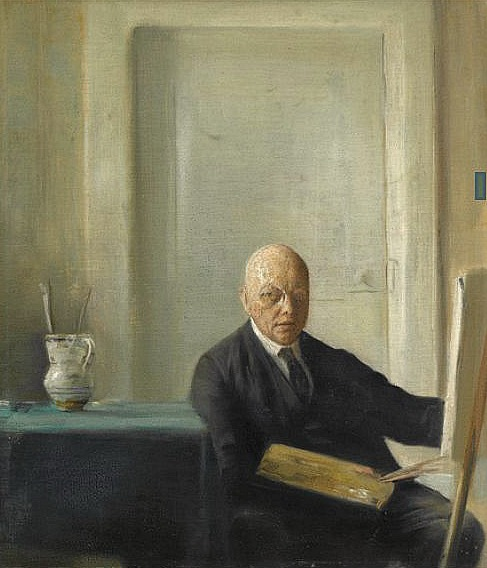
Self-portrait by Carl Holsøe, c. 1920

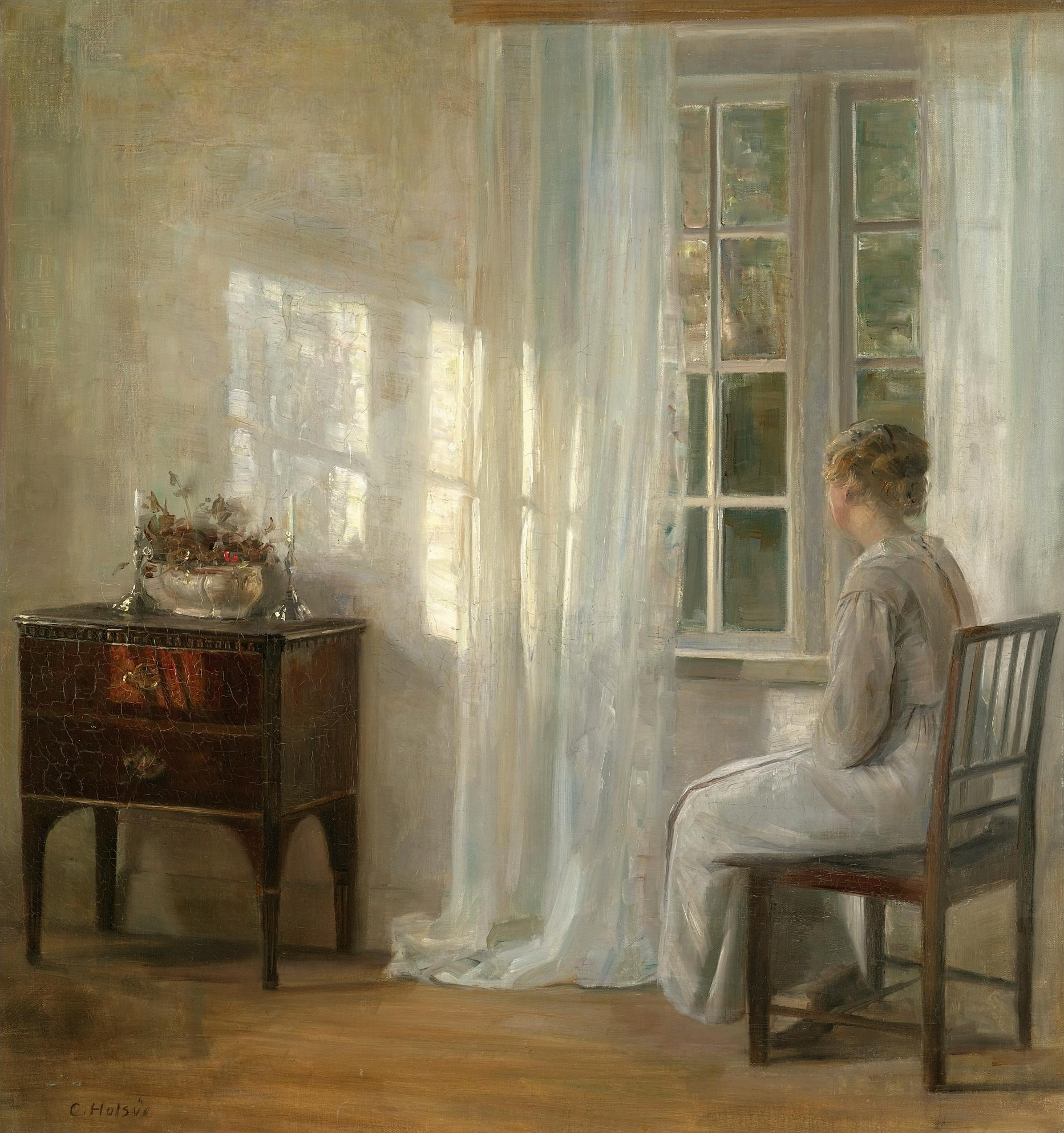
Waiting by the Window

Carl Vilhelm Holsøe (Aarhus, 12 March 1863 – Asserbo, 7 November 1935) was a Danish artist who primarily painted interiors.

== Life and career ==
Holsøe was born in Aarhus. His father was the architect N.P.C. Holsøe; his younger brother Niels Holsøe was also a painter. He studied at the Royal Danish Academy of Fine Arts in Copenhagen in 1882–84 and then at the Kunstnernes Frie Studieskoler under Peder Severin Krøyer. He received several stipends from the academy, in one instance visiting Italy in 1897.

He made his début at the 1886 Charlottenborg December Exhibition with Interior, which Karl Madsen described as "hav[ing] almost the character of a manifesto". From 1888 to 1910 and from 1922 to 1933 he showed works in the Charlottenborg Spring Exhibition, and in 1909 and 1914 in the Autumn Exhibition. He participated in the Association for National Art Exhibitions and was a member of the board of the Kunstforeningen from 1902 to 1905 and from 1909 to 1911. He was twice awarded the academy's annual medal, now the Eckersberg Medal, in 1901 (for Interior) and in 1908 (for Evening), also being made a member of the academy assembly. In 1891 he won a gold medal in Munich.

Holsøe was a friend of Vilhelm Hammershøi, whom he met at the Frie Studieskoler and who depicted him together with his brother Svend Hammershøi, Jens Ferdinand Willumsen, Madsen and Thorvald Bindesbøll in his Five Portraits.

He died in Asserbo, in North Zealand, and is buried in Vinderød churchyard. In 1894 he married Emilie Heise, who was his most frequent model; she died in 1930. On 21 October 1935, shortly before his death, he married Ingeborg Margrethe Knudsen.

== Works ==
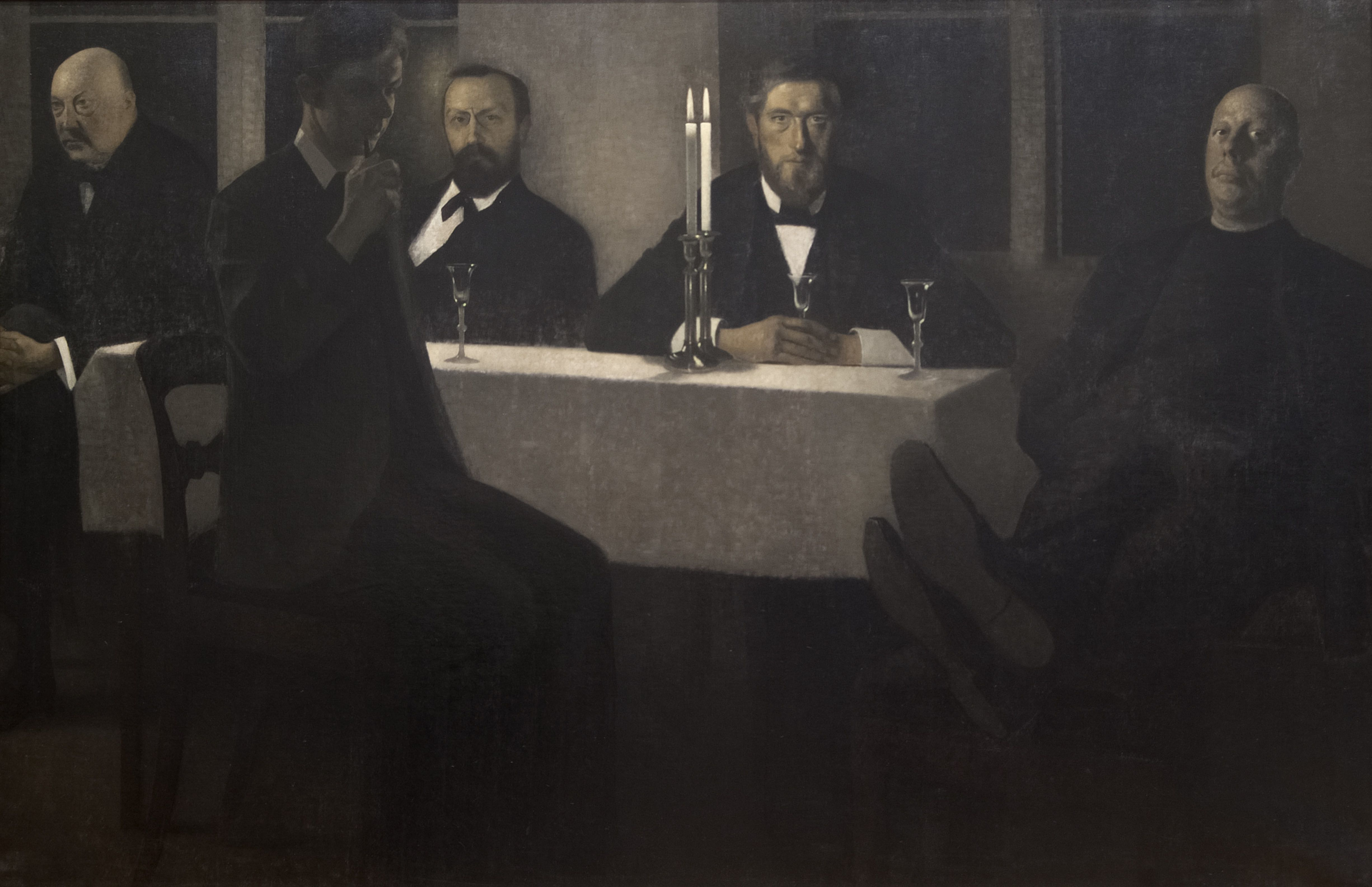
Vilhelm Hammershøi, Five Portraits (1901–02): left to right, Thorvald Bindesbøll, Svend Hammershøi (foreground, with pipe), Karl Madsen, Jens Ferdinand Willumsen, Holsøe

Holsøe's paintings include landscapes, still lifes and flowers, but like Hammershøi he primarily painted domestic interior scenes; they undoubtedly influenced each other, but it is impossible to know who first gravitated towards this subject. It was in general increasingly popular among Danish painters as the country became more industrial, with implications of refuge and restoration from professional life and the city.

Holsøe's works have come to be overshadowed by Hammershøi's: his coloration is less subtle and although there are characteristically one or sometimes a small group of figures, Holsøe's work is less innovative and unemotional by comparison with Hammershøi's expressionism. In his mastery of form and enjoyment of the beauty of things—characteristically high-ceilinged rooms with mahogany furniture—he has been compared to the Dutch masters. His paintings have been forged (with difficulty).
