= Knud Larsen =

Danish painter

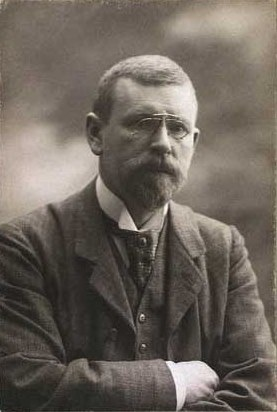
Knud Erik Larsen

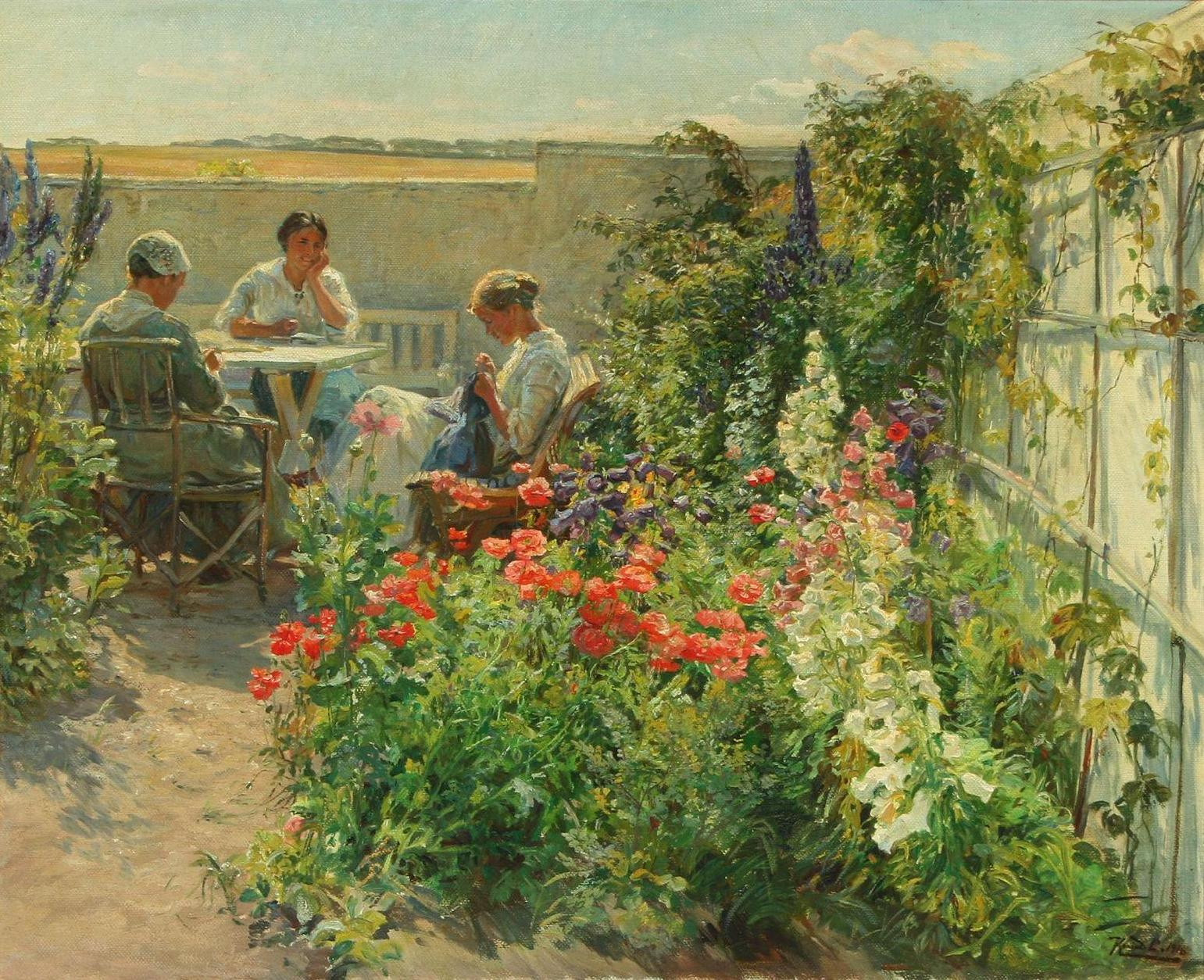
Knud Larsen: Flowery Garden Exterior with Three Women at a Table (1916)

Knud Erik Larsen (27 August 1865 – 7 December 1922) was a Danish painter.

== Biography ==
Born in Vinderød near Frederiksværk, Denmark. He was the son of Jens Peter Larsen (1826–97) and Julie Sophie Olsen (1826–97). Larsen studied painting at the Royal Danish Academy of Fine Arts, graduating in 1889. He first exhibited at the Charlottenborg Spring Exhibition in 1887. Larsen exhibited at the World's Columbian Exposition at Chicago in 1893, the General Art and Industrial Exposition of Stockholm in 1897 and the Baltic Exhibition at Malmö in 1914. Larsen travel to England 1889; Berlin and Dresden 1891; Italy 1898; Paris, the Netherlands, Belgium 1899.

Larsen originally painted landscapes and genre images. He adopted a rather conservative but pleasant style which was particularly effective in his landscapes of the Jutland countryside. His use of colour has been influenced by Hans Smidth and Vilhelm Kyhn, especially in his genre works such as Sommer. Børnene binder Kranse (1900) with bright Impressionist tones.

He later moved increasingly towards portraiture, becoming one of the most popular portraitists of his day and often working for public and private institutions. His work embraced some of the most popular contemporary figures including Vilhelm Thomsen, Harald Høffding, Axel Helsted, Hans Smidth, L.A. Ring and Theobald Stein.

Larsen was appointed a member of the Royal Art Academy General Assembly in 1898 and served as a member of the Charlottenborg Palace Exhibition Committee during 1905–06, 1914–1922. He served as a member of the General Art School Council from 1911 to 1914 and as a member of the Royal Art Academy Council from 1908 until his death i 1922.

== Personal life ==
In 1893, he married Frederikke Elisabeth Dall (1870-1963). Larsen died during 1922 in Copenhagen and was buried at Assistens Cemetery.

== Awards ==
Larsen was awarded the Neuhausens Prize in 1893, Eckersberg Medal in 1898, Thorvaldsen Medal in 1901 and the Serdin Hansens Prize in 1901, 1905.
