= Kastrup Strandpark =

Waterfront park in Denmark

Coordinates: 55.643°N 12.650°E

Kastrup Strandpark is a waterfront park on the east coast of Amager in Copenhagen, Denmark. It is situated between the larger Amager Strandpark to the north and the National Aquarium Denmark and the Scanport development to the south.

The park was established on reclaimed land in connection with the construction of the new Kastrup Marina. The project was designed by Friis & Moltke in collaboration with the landscape architect Erik Mygind.

== Kastrup Sea Bath ==
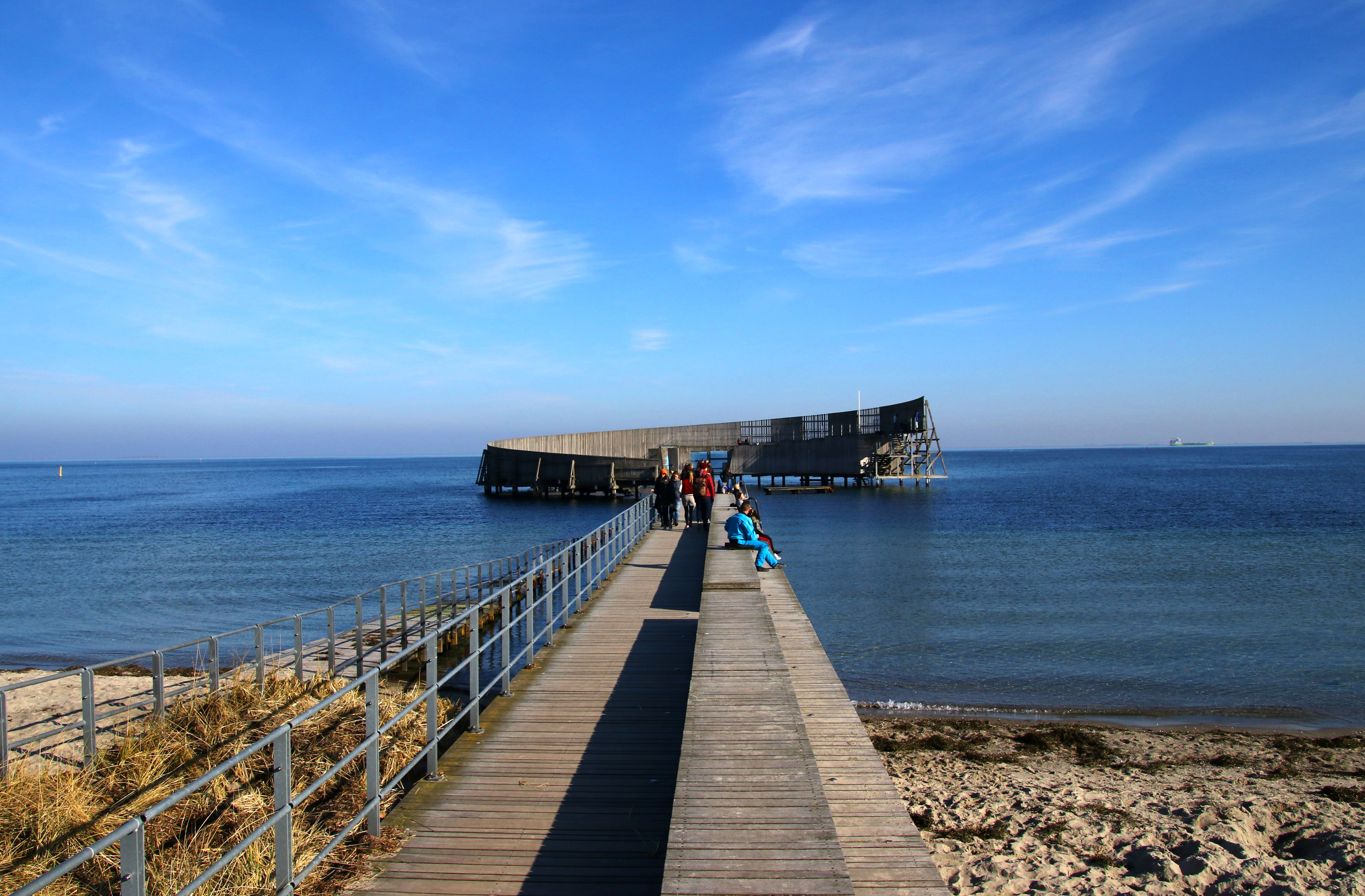
Kastrup Søbad.

Kastrup Sea Bath was built in 2004–05 to a design by White Architects. It consists of the main building on the water, a new beach and a service building with lavatories and a handicap changing room. In 2009 it received a bronze medal from the olympic committee in the swimming venues category.

== Sculptury ==
Two sculptures are found in the park. An unnamed sculpture by Søren Georg Jensen was donated by Louisiana Museum of Modern Art in 1981. Jørgen Haugen Sørensen's granite sculpture Kolossen is a donation from the Ny Carlsberg Foundation. It is 7.2 metres tall and weights 69 tons.
