= Carl Wentorf =

Danish painter

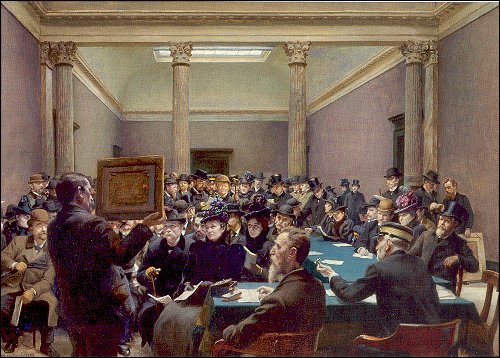
Wendorf's painting An Art Auction at Charlottenborg, 1899

Carl Christian Ferdinand Wentorf (25 April 1863 – 24 November 1914) was a Danish painter. His works included genre pieces and portraits. He won the Royal Danish Art Academy's Annual Medal in 1901.

== Biography ==
Carl Wentorf was born in Copenhagen, the son of furniture maker Heinrich Frederik Wentorf and Cecilie Juditha née Wandschneider. He attended the Royal Danish Academy of Fine Arts from 1881 to 1887. He had his debut at the Charlottenborg Exhibition in 1897 with a portrait of the landscape painter Carl Frederik Aagaard.

He travelled widely in the 1890s with economic support both from the academy and Det anckerske Legat, especially to Germany, France, Italy and the Netherlands.

Wentorf exhibited regularly at Charlottenborg as well as at a number of exhibitions abroad. His style was conservative and showed influence from Frederik Vermehren. He became part of the Society for National Art (Selskabet for National Kunst) circles through his acquaintance with Gustav Vermehren.

His Portrait of Master Carpenter Harald Olsen won the academy's Annual Medal. He also received a gold medal for the painting En Gammel Bonde paa Toften in Munich.

== Personal life ==
Wentorf married Alma Margrethe Nathalie Qvist (born 1861) on 18 April 1890.

== Works ==
- Fra Trøstens Bolig, Motiv fra en Fattiggaard (1892, Hirschsprung Collection)
- En Gudstjeneste paa Amager (1893, National Gallery of Denmark)
- Den gamle Bonde paa Toften (1899, Fuglsang Art Museum, awarded gold medal in Munich in 1901)
- Et Sladderhjørne (1898)
- Portrætterne af tømrermester Harald Olsen (Timber guild assembly hall)
- Hofjægermester Frederik Tesdorpf (1902)
- Count Ahlefeldt's three sons (1903)
- Baron Frederik Rosenørn-Lehn (1904)
- Etatsråd Bock
- Schoolmaster Miss Marie Kruse (1904)
