= Ejler Bille =

Danish artist (1910–2004)

Ejler Bille (6 March 1910 – 1 May 2004) was a Danish artist.

== Biography ==
Ejler Bille was born in Odder, Denmark. He was the son of Torben Holger Bille and Anna Kirstine Lysabild Jensen. Bille graduated from Birkerød State School in 1930, and then studied at the arts and craft school (Kunsthåndværkerskolen) in Copenhagen with Bizzie Høyer 1930–1932 and the Royal Danish Academy of Art in 1933. In 1931, he made his debut at the Artists' Autumn Exhibition (Kunstnernes Efterårsudstilling).

Bille joined Linien in 1934, Corner in 1940 and CoBrA in 1949. He had concentrated on small sculptures, but moved into painting after joining CoBrA. In 1969 he was a guest professor at the Royal Danish Academy of Art.

== Awards ==
- 1960: Eckersberg Medal
- 1969: Thorvaldsen Medal
- 1987: Prince Eugen Medal
- 2001: Amalienborg Prize

== See also ==
- List of Danish painters
