= Carl Sørensen =

Carl Sørensen may refer to:

- Carl Frederik Sørensen (1818–1879), Danish artist
- Carl Theodor Sørensen (1893–1979), Danish landscape architect
