= Büsra Barut =

Danish-born Turkish footballer (born 1997)

Personal information
- Date of birth: 20 May 1997 (age 29)
- Place of birth: Ganløse, Egedal Municipality, Denmark
- Position: Forward

Senior career*
Years	Team	Apps	(Gls)
2016–2018	Brøndby	20	(3)
2018–	Nordjælland	18	(3)

International career^{‡}
2015–2016	Denmark U19	6	(1)
2019–	Turkey	4	(0)
- * Club domestic league appearances and goals as of 17 August 2019 ‡ National team caps and goals as of 11 November 2019

Büsra Barut (born 20 May 1997), also known as Büşra Barut in Turkish spelling, is a Danish-born Turkish footballer who plays as a forward for the Turkey women's national team. She has previously been a member of the Denmark women's national under-19 team.

== Personal life ==
Barut was born on 20 May 1997 in Ganløse, Egedal Municipality, Denmark.

In November 2021, she revealed that she has a relationship with footballer Joakim Mæhle, with whom she has exact the same birthdate.

== Club career ==
Barut played two seasons for Brøndby IF in the 3F League before she joined Farum BK, which was integrated into FC Nordsjælland in 2018. She is a member of FC Nordsjælland.

== International career ==
Denmark women's national U19 Barut was admitted to the Denmark women's national U19 team and took part at the 2016 UEFA Women's Under-19 Championship qualification matches in 2015 and 2016, scoring one goal.

Turkey women's national She was called up by the Turkey women's national team to play at the UEFA Women's Euro 2021 qualifying Group A matches.

== Honours ==
3F League

Brøndby IF
Runners-up (1): 2017–18

Danish Women's Cup

Brøndby IF
Winners (1): 2018
