= Lone Høyer Hansen =

Danish sculptor (1950–2021)

Lone Høyer Hansen (1950 – August 17, 2021) was a Danish sculptor who created works with combinations of untraditional materials such as concrete, cellophane, fabrics and plaster.

== Biography ==
Born in Copenhagen on 13 August 1950, Høyer Hansen was the daughter of the fish merchant Ove Wagner Høyer Hansen and Inge Agnete Dam. She studied at the Royal Danish Academy of Fine Arts under Willy Ørskov (1980–83) and at the Kunstpædagogisk Skole (Arts Pedagogical School) under Helge Bertram (1983–85).

Høyer Hansen's art ranged from the minimalistic combination of objects to sculpture based on materials such as plaster, bronze, concrete and fabrics. As she sometimes worked as a member of a group, her work often relates to the concepts of other sculptors. Since the early 1980s she has also created sculptural works for the stage and has incorporated video and slide projections.

From 2003-2009, Lone Høyer Hansen was Professor at The Sculpture School at The Royal Danish Academy of Fine Arts. Since her professorship at the academy, Høyer Hansen completed a number of large-scale artworks in the public space in Copenhagen: including a suite of sculptures on view at Københavns Biocenter (part of the University of Copenhagen); the decorative coloring of the exterior at Bordings Friskole (both the latter installations include sculptures in neon); a large cylindrical sculpture in steel, mounted in front of Professionshøjskolen Metropol; and various sculptural elements for noma restaurant.

Høyer Hansen died on 17 August 2021.
