= Anne Marie Lütken =

Danish painter

Anna Maria (Anne Marie) Lütken (1916–2001) was a Danish painter who is remembered above all for her distinctive figure paintings, frequently based on her mother, her grandmother or herself as models. She also painted scenes of nature, including landscapes from Vendsyssel in the north of Jutland. In 2008, her works were presented together with those of Agnete Bjerre in an exhibition at Vrå where she was a member of the cultural association from 1956.

== Biography ==
Born on 29 September 1916 in Årby near Kalundborg, Anna Maria Lütken was the daughter of the writer Povline Lütken (1893–1977). From 1947, she studied at the Royal Danish Academy of Fine Arts under Vilhelm Lundstrøm, Kræsten Iversen and Elof Risebye, graduating in 1955. While still studying, she exhibited her works from 1951, contributing to the Charlottenborg Spring Exhibitions (1953–1975) and Vrå exhibitions (1953–1984), and to many other shows.

From her début in 1951, Lütken developed her monumental figure style, becoming a distinctive contributor to Danish painting. She frequently used her mother and grandmother as models, her female figures extending over most of the painting surface. Her figures are usually combined with details such as the side of a chair leg or a table top, resulting in their appearance as part of a spatial whole. In her well balanced compositions, dark brown, green and greyish black areas form contrasts with a few much brighter areas. In her most successful works, the figures present stunning expressions of human existence.

In 2008, her works were presented together with those of Agnete Bjerre in an exhibition at Vrå. She had grown up in Vendsyssel and had been a member of the cultural association in Vrå from 1956.

Anne Marie Lütken died on 10 August 2001 and is buried in Hellerup Cemetery.
