= Kirsten Dehlholm =

Danish artist and artistic theatre director (1945–2024)

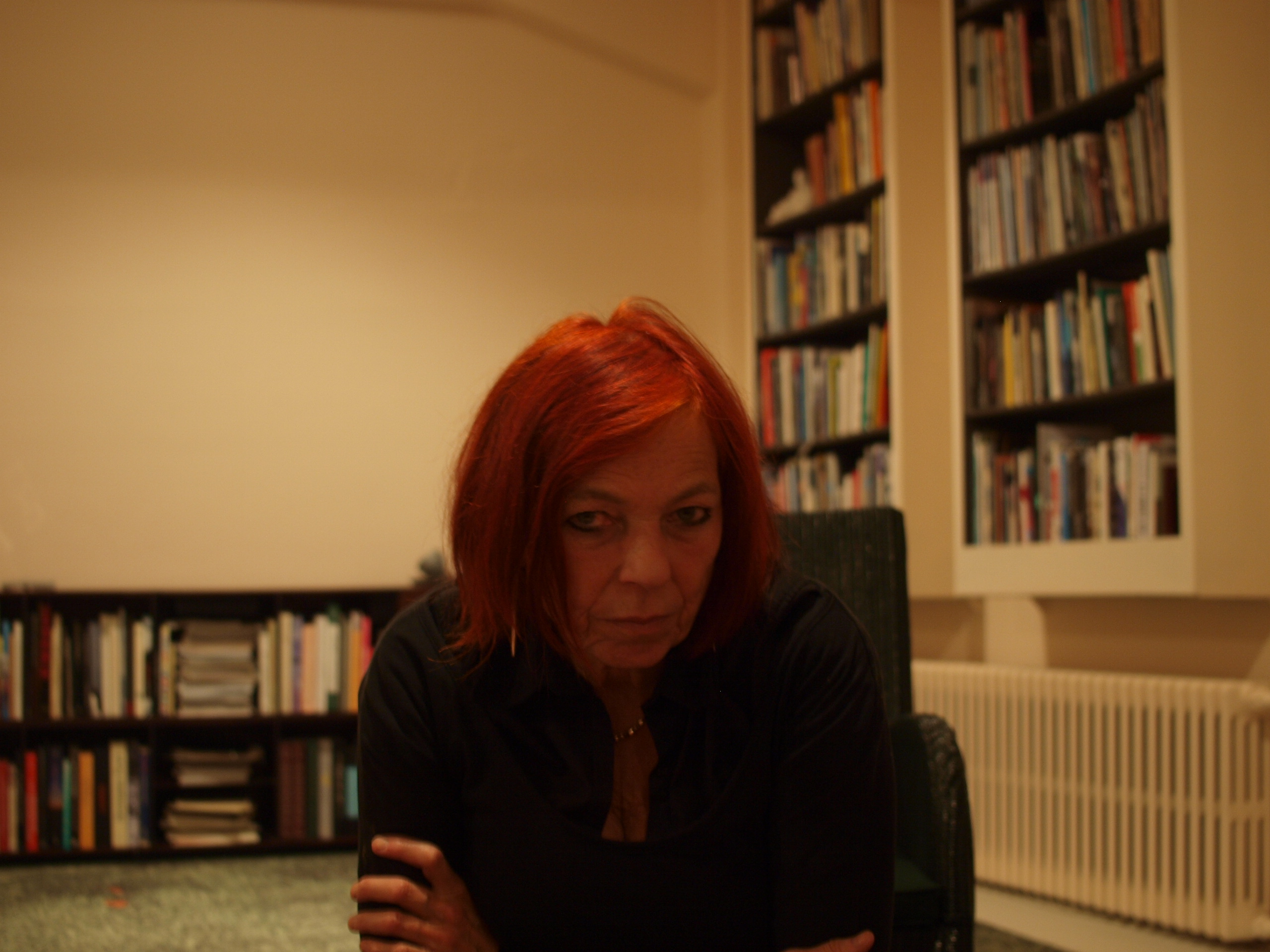

Kirsten Dehlholm (5 April 1945 – 10 July 2024) was a Danish artist and artistic theatre director. She created over 30 presentations combining scenography with performance art, employing a wide variety of techniques, media, and materials.

== Biography ==
Born in Vejle, after matriculating from high school, Dehlholm studied textile arts at the Werkkunstschule (Arts and Crafts School) in Krefeld, Germany. She spent the next three years at Kunsthåndværkerskolen in Copenhagen. In 1969, she married the writer Otto Sigvaldi who sold his books from a pram in central Copenhagen dressed in the fanciful costumes she had designed.

In the 1970s, Dehlholm worked as a scenographer for the Rimfaxe theatre group. In 1977, together with Per Flink Basse, she founded Billedstofteatret, a theatrical collective which functioned until 1985. She developed new concepts for performance art, creating scenarios in which people formed artistic tableaux accompanied by music or sound effects. Her creations included Gyldne vinger og blå løfter (Golden Wings and Blue Promises, Charlottenborg, 1977) and Påtrængende slægtninge(Instrusive Relatives), a live exhibit presented at Ny Carlsberg Glyptotek in 1979.

In 1985, Dehlholm formed the Hotel Pro Forma theatre group which she directed until her death. She created some 30 performances combining art with theatrical presentation drawing on landscape painting and modern, minimalistic design. Some of her works include mirrored images and optical illusions. Her Terra Australia Incognita (National Museum, 1989) inspired by voyages of discovery put the viewer in the unusual position of gaining a bird's eye view of the actors lying below. Her Hvorfor blir det nat, mor? (Why Does it night come mother, Aarhus City Hall, 1989) where the audience was standing on balconies looking down on the white floor where the performers performed. Her collaboration with architects, writers, and composers gave her a reputation as an important player in the renewal of theatrical scenography. It was her ability to develop experimental installations combining existential themes such as belief, identity, and war which led to her being awarded the Thorvaldsen Medal] in 2013. She was commended for her consistently innovative artistic creations and for her strong sense of scenic confrontation. In 2015 she was awarded with the distinguished Artist Award for the Performing Arts (ISPA) as well as the Danish Honorary Reumert Award of the Year.

Dehlholm died on 10 July 2024, at the age of 79.

== Awards ==
In 1994, she was awarded the Eckersberg Medal and, in 2013, the Thorvaldsen Medal. In 2015 she was awarded the Reumert prize of honour.
