= Knud Hvidberg =

Danish painter and sculptor

Knud Wedel Hvidberg (27 May 1927 – 5 May 1986) was a Danish painter and sculptor.

== Biography ==
Born in Holstebro in central Jutland, Hvidberg was a self-taught artist. In the early 1960s, he first painted in a Constructivist style inspired by Gunnar Aagaard Andersen and other members of the Linien II artists association. His sculptural creations were mobiles made of roof gutters, plexiglass and iron driven by electric motors with shining lights. One, developed together with William Soya, also had a sound and light component, predating later installations. His 1965 POEX exhibition combined avant-garde developments in art, poetry and drama. Hvidberg sought to give his mobiles associations with the cosmos and with ancient civilisations. While in Rome in the early 1979s, he again became interested in Symbolism which had characterized his early works with crosses and swastikas.

In the 1980s, Hvidberg decorated a number of buildings including the Vordingborg Educational Centre (Vordingborg Uddannelsescenter) in 1985.

== Awards ==
In 1972, Hvidberg was awarded the Eckersberg Medal.

== Literature ==
- Hvidberg, Knud; Houmann, Søren; Sandberg, Jens Henrik (1991). Knud Hvidberg. Herning Kunstmuseum. ISBN 978-87-88367-16-4.
