= Frederik Lange =

Danish painter

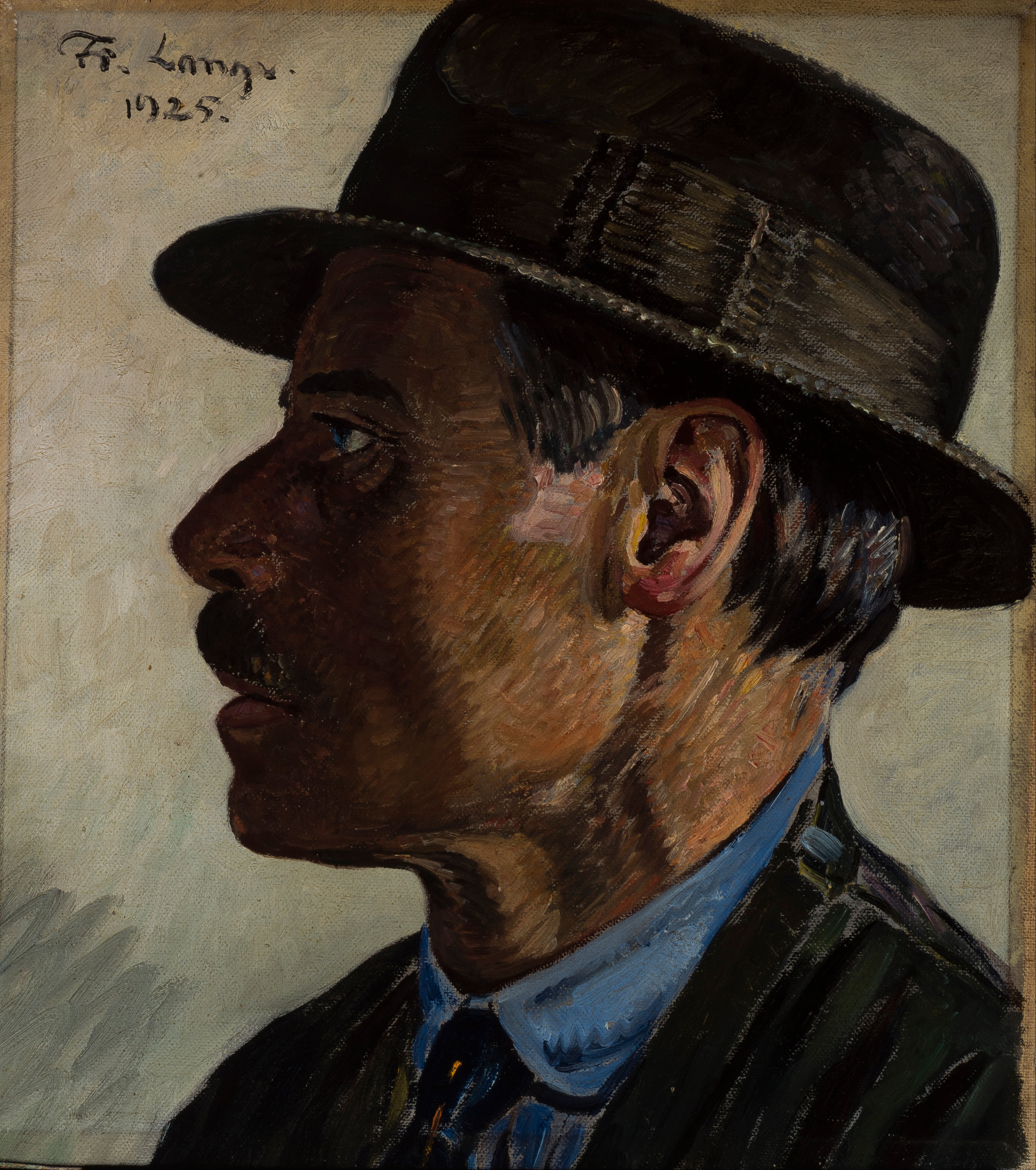
Self-portrait (1925)

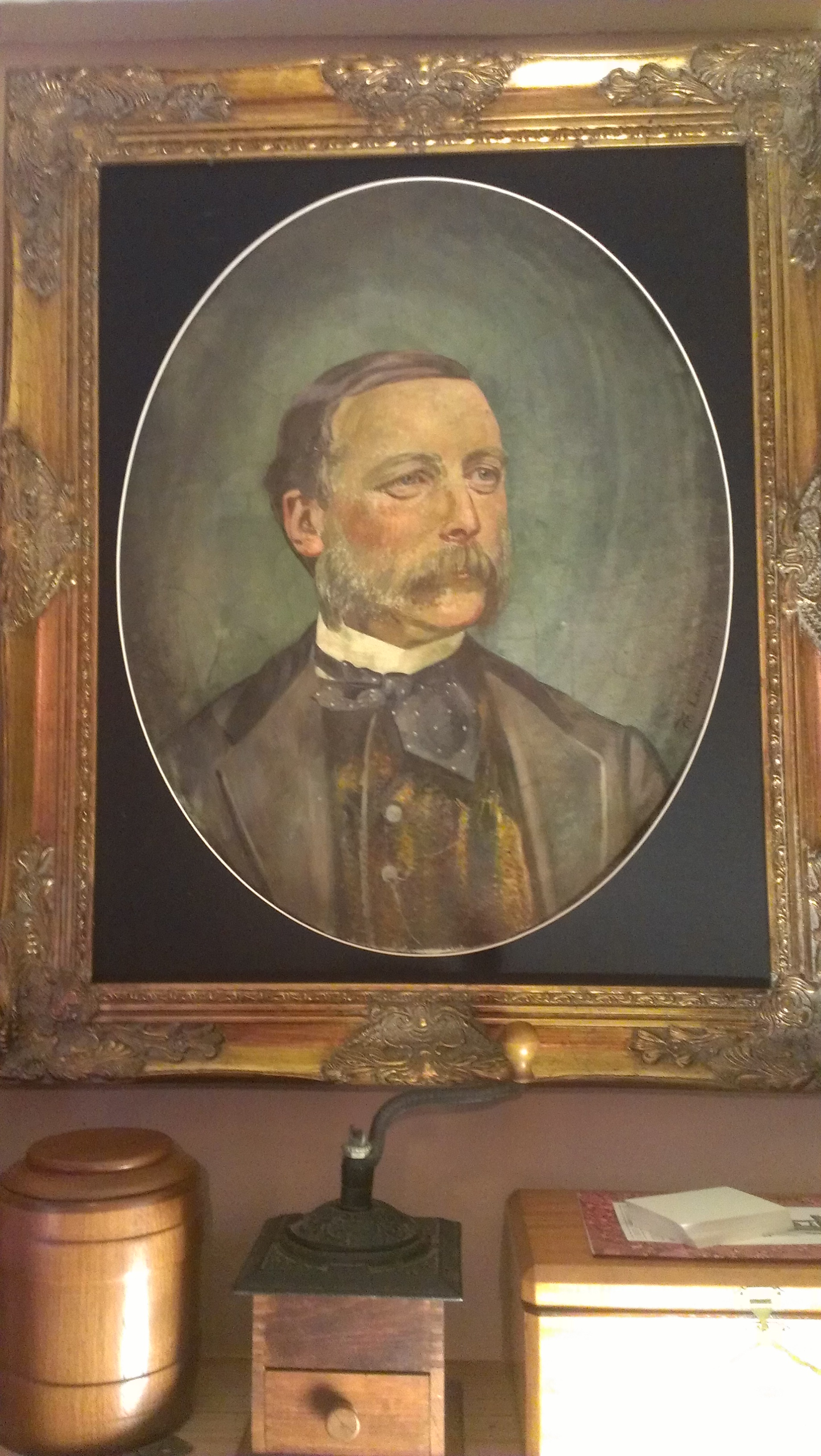
Portrait of man 1919, oil by Federik Lange.

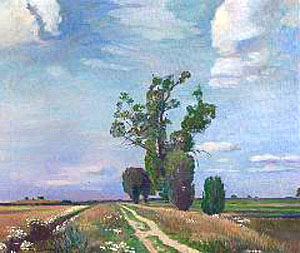
Frederik Lange: Road to Skagen (1932)

Frederik Lange (31 July 1870 – 30 June 1941) was a Danish painter. Initially he specialized in portrait work but in later life, after he had settled in Skagen, he turned to landscapes, often depicting the sand dunes in the evening light.

== Early life ==
Lange was born in Frederiksberg, Denmark. He was the son of art historian Julius Henrik Lange and Louise Aagaard. After taking an interest in painting from an early age, he studied at the Royal Danish Academy from 1893 to 1896 and then went on to the Kunstnernes Frie Studieskoler where he was a student of P.S. Krøyer.

== Career ==
Lange developed a Naturalistic style which can be considered moderate for the period. Throughout his life, he painted landscapes, still lifes and above all portraits which display energy, precision, and character. His landscapes show scenes of the Little Belt, Odsherred and Skagen where he became a permanent resident in 1924. Here he made friends with the older members of the Skagen Painters colony, some of whom had been taught by his father. He settled in Skagen Vesterby near the sprawling moors where he painted and went hunting, often in the company of King Christian X of Denmark. After a nervous breakdown in 1931, he became more withdrawn. In later years, he preferred painting in the open air, turning to landscapes rather than portraits. Among his more notable works are scenes of the sand dunes in the bright evening light. Lange received the Eckersberg Medaillen in 1907 and 1910.
