= Franka Rasmussen =

German-Danish textile artist

Franziska Paula Konstante Rasmussen née Duden (1907–1994) was a German-born textile artist and painter who moved to Denmark in 1930. Initially influenced by the minimalist Bauhaus style, she soon developed her own distinctive Structuralist approach to weaving, becoming one of Denmark's most important contributors to tapestry. In 1935, she joined the Danish School of Arts and Crafts (Kunsthåndværkerskole) where she remained for over 40 years, teaching painting and composition, increasingly with an emphasis on textile art.

== Biography ==
Born on 20 March 1907 in Frankfurt am Main, Germany, Franziska Paula Konstante Duden was the daughter of the German business executive Paul Duden (1868–1954) and his wife Johanne Bertha Nebe (died 1935). The youngest of five children, she was brought up in a well-to-do family; her father, a member of the executive board of the chemical firm Hoechst, was an amateur painter, while her mother came from a family of academics. Her grandfather Konrad Duden was a linguist and founder of the well-known German language dictionary bearing his name. After attending courses in painting, Franka Duden studied at the Kunstgewerbeschule (School of Arts and Crafts) in Frankfurt (1928–29), where she met her future husband, the painter Peter Christian Rasmussen (1897–1935). They married in 1930.

After Paul Rasmussen had accepted a position at the newly established Kunsthåndværkerskole (Arts and Crafts School) in Copenhagen, the couple moved to Denmark. While her husband was teaching, Franka created paintings and textiles in her studio. Initially she adopted the simplistic Bauhaus idiom but soon began to develop her own artistic style. After her husband's premature death in 1935, Rasmussen began to teach herself, obtaining a permanent position at the Arts and Crafts School in 1940. She turned out to be an excellent pedagogue, constantly encouraging her students to develop their own artistic styles.

Assisted by her colleague Gunilla Lagerbjelke, Rasmussen's work became increasingly based on textiles. Her earlier tapestries and woven creations were inspired by nature but they evolved towards experimental, structuralistically formatted designs, often made of coarse yarns.

She held solo exhibitions from 1954 and was one of the few Danes to be represented at the Textile Biennale in Lausanne in 1967.

Franka Rasmussen died in Copenhagen on 14 December 1994.

== Awards ==
In addition to a number of grants and scholarships, Rasmussen received the Eckersberg Medal in 1982.
