= Jens Birkemose =

Danish painter (1943–2022)

- Born: 28 June 1943
- Died: 8 September 2022
- Education: Royal Danish Academy of Fine Arts Académie des Beaux-Arts
- Awards: Eckersberg Medal

Jens Birkemose (28 June 1943 – 8 September 2022) was a Danish contemporary painter.

Originally a student of piano, music theory, and composition, he went on to study at the Royal Danish Academy of Art in Copenhagen and the Académie des Beaux-Arts in Paris.

Birkemose's works were inspired by the New York School of painting and are famous for their hidden shapes, some of which take a lot of effort to discover. Examples of these shapes include demon-like creatures, mermaids, birds, and cats.

Birkemose was the 1991 winner of the Eckersberg Medal and was represented at several of Denmark's museums, including the Danish national gallery, Statens Museum for Kunst.

From 1976 Paris was Birkemose's primary residence.
