= Ganløse =

- Town
- Ganløse Pond

- Location within Denmark Location within Capital Region
- Coordinates: 55°47′31″N 12°15′53″E
- Country: Denmark
- Region: Capital Region
- Municipality: Egedal Municipality

Area
  - Urban: 1.23 km^{2} (0.47 sq mi)

Population (2026)
  - Urban: 2,872
  - Urban density: 2,330/km^{2} (6,050/sq mi)
- Time zone: UTC+1 (CET)
  - Summer (DST): UTC+2 (CEST)

Ganløse is a town located in the Egedal Municipality, in the Capital Region of Denmark.

== Notable people ==
- Hans Knudsen (1865–1947) a Danish artist of landscape paintings. He lived close to the forest edge of Ganløse Ore in Egedal, right on the border with Værløse. He died west of Ganløse at Slagslunde
- Poul Reichhardt (1913 in Ganløse – 1985) a Danish actor, known for his roles in Danish 1940s/1950s comedies
- Büsra Barut (born 1997 in Ganløse) a Turkish-Danish women's football forward
