= Aage Nielsen-Edwin =

Danish sculptor

- Born: 17 July 1898; Copenhagen, Denmark
- Died: 19 October 1985 (aged 87); Reykjavík, Iceland
- Occupation: Sculptor

Aage Nielsen-Edwin (17 July 1898 – 19 October 1985) was a Danish sculptor. His work was part of the sculpture event in the art competition at the 1936 Summer Olympics. He was awarded the Eckersberg Medal in 1943.
