= Gunnar Jensen =

Gunnar Jensen (31 March 1863 – 6 May 1948) was a Danish medallist and sculptor. He served as chief medallist for the Royal Danish Mint from 1901 to 1933.

== Early life and education ==
Jensen was born in Copenhagen on 31 March 1863, the son of Knud Christian J. og Vilhelmine Methine Rasmussen. He learned chiselling and engraving from his father. He matruciualted from the Technical Institute in May 1880 before studying sculpture at Royal Danish Academy of Fine Arts under Harald Conradsen, J.A. Jerichau and Th. Stein. Upon his graduation in May 1995, he moved to Paris where he continued his training under Jules-Clément Chaplain and Louis-Oscar Roty.

== Career ==
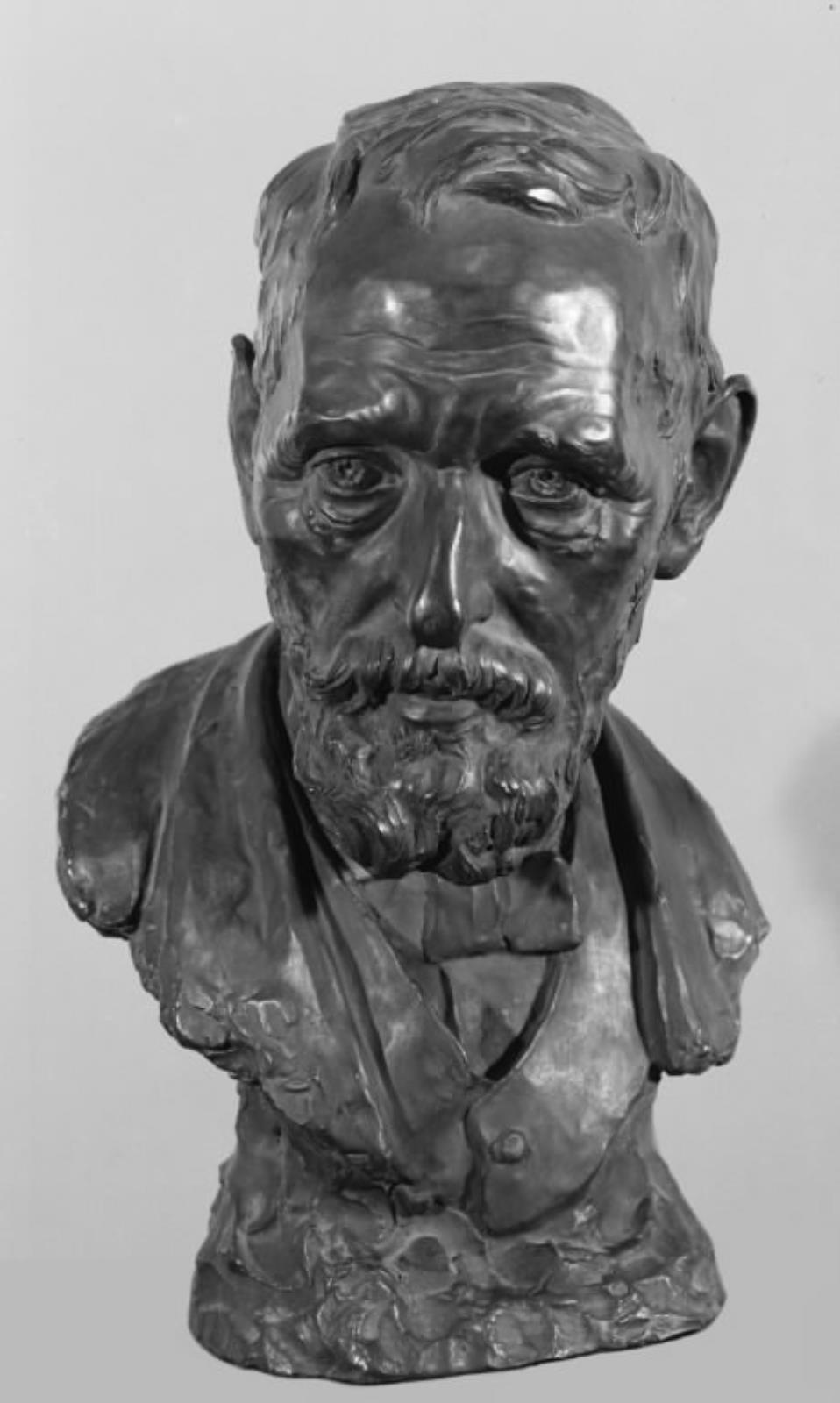
Jensen's portrait bust of L. A. Ring,

Jensen was associated the Royal Mint from 1886. He was instrumental in introducing new technical equipment, including the country's first reduction machine (1904). In 1901–1933, he served as chief medallist. He created the medallion work on most new Danish coins, many of which remained in circulation until the 1960s. His style was influenced by Bronze Age art.

His works as a sculptor include a portrait bust of the painter L. A. Ring currently held by the National Gallery of Denmark.

== Personal life ==
Jensen married twice, first to Elise Berthine Mogensen (1872–1942) and then to Poula Thomsen. He died on 6 May 1848 in Frederiksberg.

== Awards ==
- K.A. Larssens og Hustru L.M. Larssens født Thodbergs Legat (1888)
- Det anckerske Legat (1899)
- Royal Danish Academy of Fine Arts' Annual Medal (1896, 1912)
- Silver medal, Brussels (1913)
- Silver medal, Gent (1914)
