= Niels Macholm =

Danish artist

Niels Macholm (26 August 1915 – 5 November 1997) was a self-taught Danish artist. He had his debut at Kunstnernes Efterårsudstilling in 1944 and received the Eckersberg Medal in 1976.
