= Søren Georg Jensen =

Danish silversmith

Søren Georg Jensen (4 October 1917 – 20 September 1982) was a Danish silversmith and sculptor. Son of the noted silversmith Georg Jensen, he was the artistic director of the Georg Jensen Silversmithy from 1962 to 1974.

== Early life and education ==
Born in Copenhagen, Jensen was trained as a silversmith by his father, Georg Jensen. He then attended Bizzie Høyer's drawing school (1931–36) before studying sculpture at the Royal Danish Academy of Fine Arts under Einar Utzon-Frank (1941–45). In 1946, he completed his studies under the Russian sculptor Ossip Zadkine in Paris.

== Biography ==
One of Jensen's early works was a full-size statue of David (1946) for which he won the Academy's gold medal. From the beginning of the 1950s, he adopted a Naturalistic approach which became increasingly Abstract. He worked mainly with granite and marble but occasionally with bronze and clay. He also experimented with other materials such as glass or even clay piping. Jensen's sculptural works often consist of interlocking stones, each independently worked.

From 1949, Jensen was a designer at the Georg Jensen company, becoming its artistic director from 1962 to 1974. He contributed a series of notable hollowware pieces as well as a few items of jewelry. Inspired by the Functionalist movement, one of his bracelets consisted of broad links clasped together with expanded hinges forming an attractive decorated band. He also incorporated geometrical shapes, for example in cufflinks combining a circular ring with a flat bar. As a silversmith, he often worked in his workshop in the Louisiana Museum of Modern Art while as a sculptor, from 1962 he moved to the island of Bornholm where he was close to the granite quarries and could rely on the assistance of local stonecutters. In the early 1970s, he spent a period in Italy, working on Aurora Septentionalis for the Academy. He finally moved to Pietrasanta in 1976.

Jensen's best known creations include Tre sten (Three Stones, 1965) for the Technical University of Denmark, Helios Boreios (1972) for Bergen University, and, outside the Foreign Ministry in Christianshavn, Kyklopen, Den lange rejse og Galionsfigur.

== Awards ==
In 1966, Jensen was awarded the Eckersberg Medal and, in 1974, the Thorvaldsen Medal.
