= Søren Jensen (sculptor) =

Danish sculptor and photographer (born 1957)

Søren Jensen (born 1957) is a Danish sculptor and photographer.

Born in Copenhagen, he graduated from the Royal Danish Academy of Fine Arts in 1986.

His works are displayed at the National Museum of Art and the Trapholt Art Museum as well as at several other buildings, including Elsinore City Hall, Hvidovre Town Hall, TDC's headquarters in the South Harbour in Copenhagen and Nordea's headquarters at Christianshavn.

From 1999 to 2005, Jensen was Rector of the Funen Art Academy in Odense.

His work explores the spatial relationships between sculpture and architecture. In 2004 he was awarded the Eckersberg Medal by the Royal Danish Academy of Fine Arts.
