= Willy Ørskov =

Danish sculptor (1920–1990)

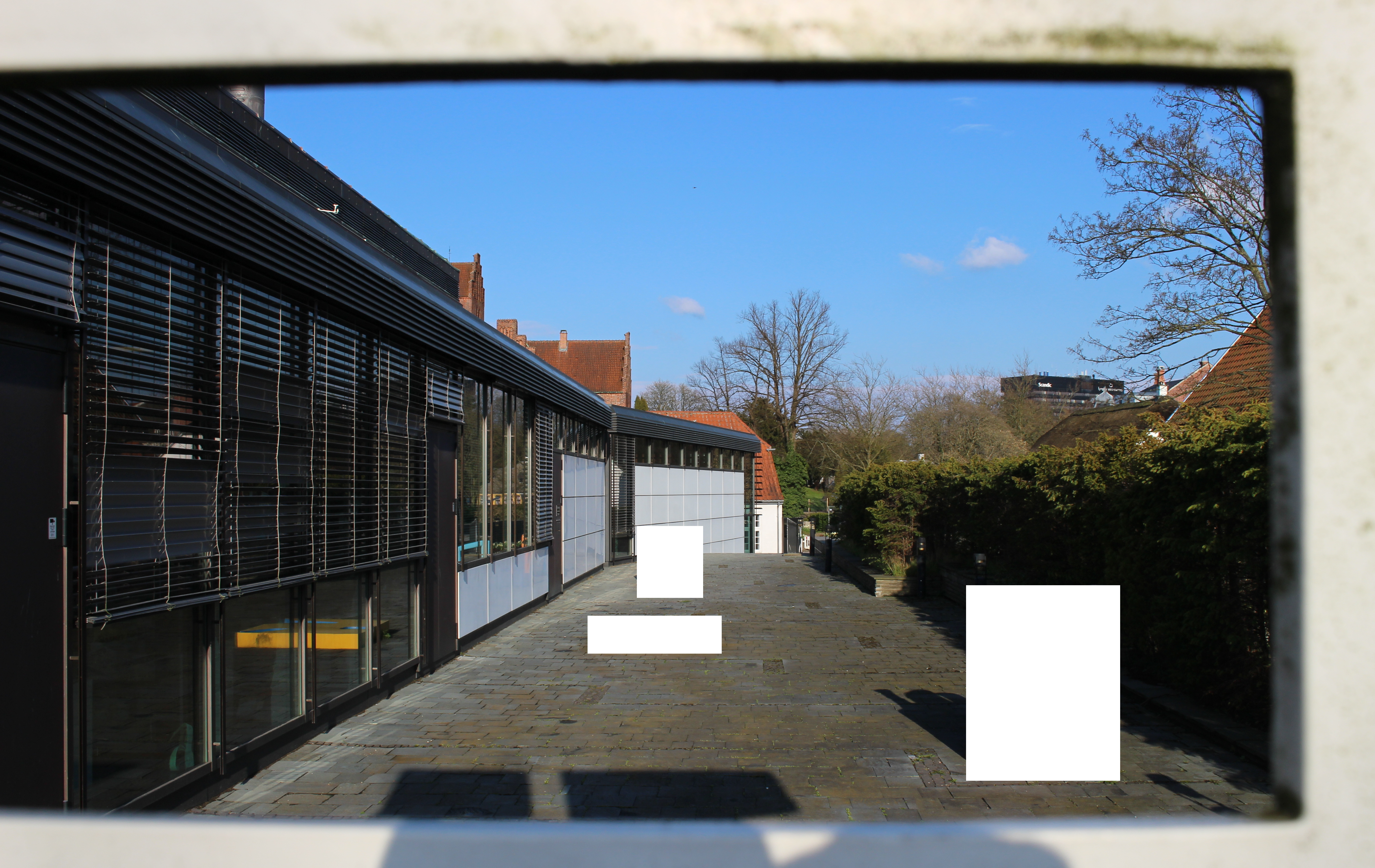
Willy Ørskov's group of sculptures next to the Lyngby City Library, Kongens Lyngby, Denmark (censored due to lack of freedom of panorama).

Willy Ørskov (21 December 1920 – 12 June 1990) was a Danish sculptor who is remembered for works created from plastics and inflatable materials.

== Biography ==
Ørskov's studies at the Valand School of Fine Arts in Gothenburg, Sweden (1954–1960) were completed by stays in Paris, Greece and Italy at the end of the 1950s. During his years in Gothenburg, he taught and worked with ceramics. His early works such as Bymiljø and Gående are Abstract works depicting man in the city. He later began to use plastics including finished products such as pipes and funnels. His pneumatic sculptures consist of inflated pillow shapes and air-filled tubes as can be seen in Sommerskulptur (Summer Sculpture) from the mid-1960s.

Ørskov's works are not designed to be interpreted in terms of recognizable features but rather as an expression of contemporary art, free of any relationship with romantic notions of Naturalism or Mythology. One of his well-known dictums was "The sculpture's content is sculpture." He explained his approach in books such as Aflæsninger af objekter og andre essays (Readings of objects and other essays, 1972) and Den åbne skulptur og udvendighedens æstetik (Open Sculpture and the Aesthetics of the Exterior, 1987). Later in life, he became preoccupied with Terrains Vagues, the largely unorganized, underdeveloped areas on the outskirts of built-up areas, typically with casual, temporary living quarters where he found traces of a primitive sculptural language.

== Restoration of works ==
The Danish National Gallery is currently undertaking the restoration of 13 of Ørskov's inflated works which are considered to be of outstanding national importance. Made of materials such as plastics and rubber, the sculptures have deteriorated to a point where they are no longer inflatable. After restoration and re-establishment of their pneumatic properties, the works will once again be suitable for display.

== Awards ==
Ørskov was awarded the Eckersberg Medal in 1969 and the Thorvaldsen Medal in 1973.

== Bibliography ==
- Edwards, Folke: Willy Ørskov, 1976, Copenhagen, Gyldendal, ISBN 8701344617. (in Danish)
- Grathwol, Grethe; Bojesen, Benedicte: Willy Ørskov retrospektiv, 1994, Copenhagen, Sophienholm. (in Danish)
- Ørskov, Willy: Aflæsning af objekter og andre essays, 1966, Copenhagen, Borgen. (in Danish)
- Ørskov, Willy: Den öppna skulpturen = avion veistotaide = den åbne skulptur, 1987, Helsinki, Nordiskt konstcentrum. ISBN 951960510X
- Ørskov, Willy:
- Ørskov, Willy: Lighed og identitet, 1978, Copenhagen, Borgen. ISBN 8741847016. (in Danish)
- Ørskov, Willy: Objekterne - proces og tilstand, 1972, Copenhagen, Borgen. (in Danish, Finnish, and Swedish)
