= Hans Smidth =

Danish painter (1839–1917)

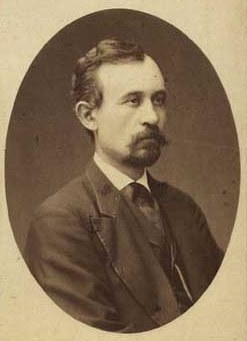
Hans Smidth; photographed by N.E. Sinding (1864)

Hans Ludvig Smidth (2 October 1839, Nakskov – 5 May 1917, Frederiksberg) was a Danish painter. He is remembered above all for his paintings of Jutland and its local inhabitants.

== Biography ==
Smidth was the son of the city bailiff of Skive, Edvard Philip Smidth, and the brother of Verner Frederik Læssøe Smidth who founded the cement concern F. L. Smidth & Co. After graduating from school, he began to study medicine but gave it up in favour of art. In 1861, he entered the Danish Academy where he studied under Niels Simonsen. In 1866, he began to experience financial difficulties and left the Academy to continue his studies himself, painting scenes of Limfjord and the moors of Jutland. He first exhibited at Charlottenborg in 1867 with two landscape paintings and continued to exhibit there over the years. His works depicted country life in Jutland, most of them with an emphasis on animals and local figures. He had a talent for form and detail but his use of colour was rather dry, diminishing the appeal of his paintings to the general public. In 1870-71, he studied under Vilhelm Kyhn.

As the years went by, Smidth's style developed considerably, earning him the Neuhausen Prize in 1877 for En fremmed spørger om Vej i Bondegaarden paa Heden which was not only technically impressive but showed a fineness of tone. His increasing acceptance as a master of painting in Jutland paved the way for his reputation at the national level.

In fact Smidth had to wait until the year 1900 before he experienced full recognition. That year, the Danish Art Society arranged a special exhibition of the artist's work although he was now 60. Unexpectedly, 290 of the 300 works sketches and drawings exhibited were sold. In retrospect, his paintings are free of historical or mythical figures, they do not interpret scenes along the lines of the Skagen Painters. They simply depict the views of the people and the countryside as he saw them. His paintings show he had the same respect for the land as the peasants themselves. He was awarded the Eckersberg Medal in 1906.

== Gallery ==
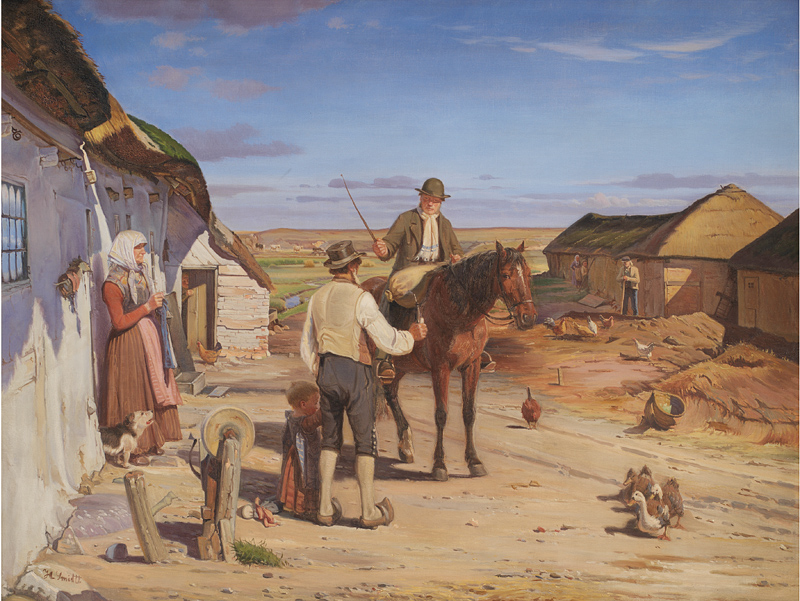
A Stranger Asks for Directions to the Farm on the Heath (1877)

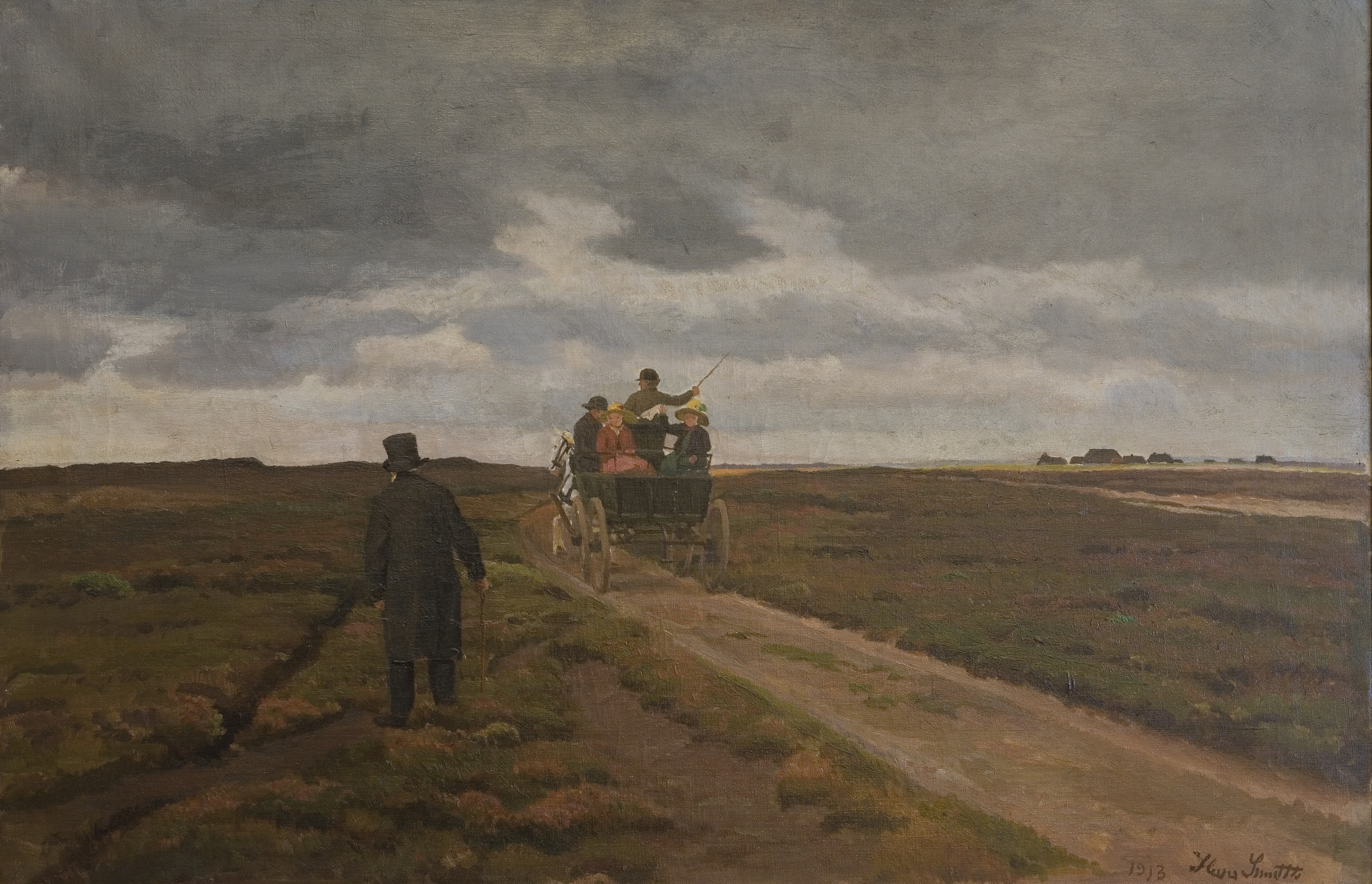
Moor Landscape with a Coach (1913)

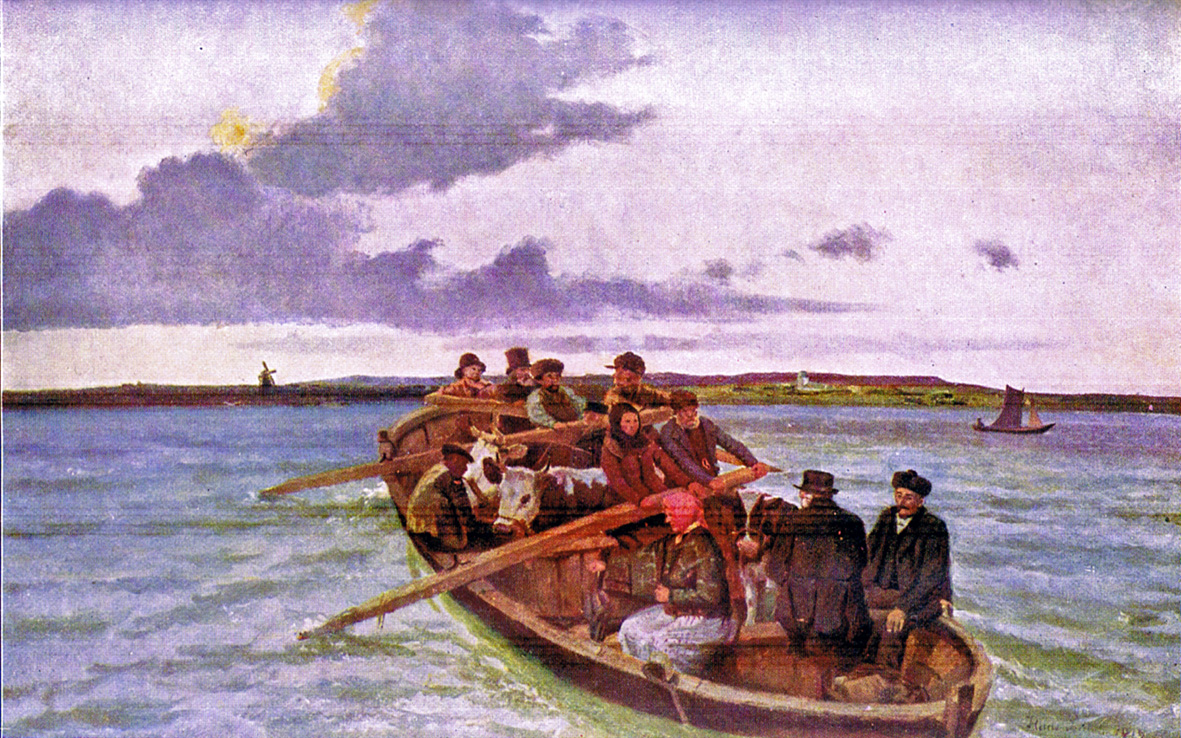
Ferry Crossing Sallingssund - Limfjorden

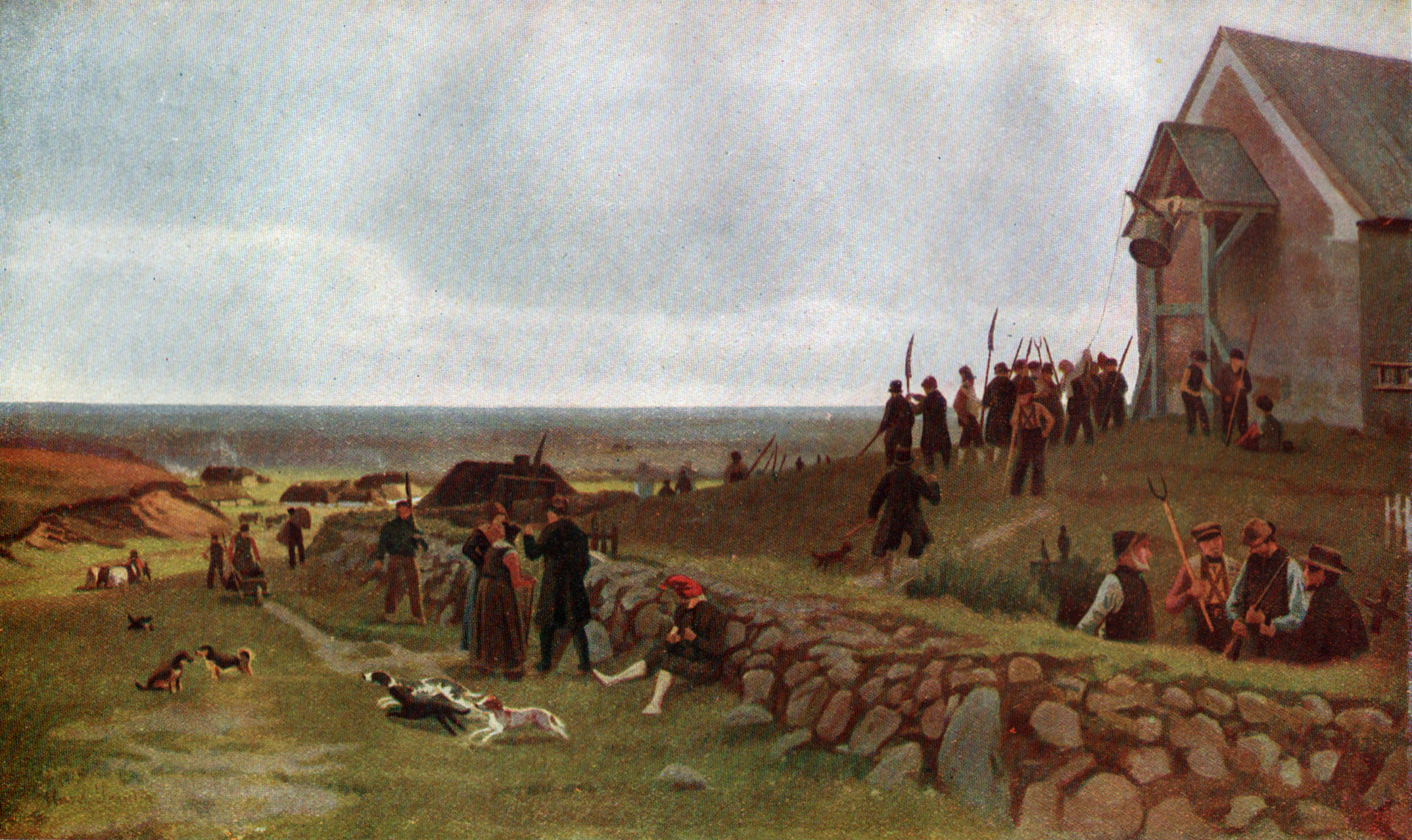
Storm Bells
