= Holger J. Jensen =

Danish painter (1900–1966)

Holger Jens Sophus Jensen (21 April 1900 – 24 July 1966) was a Danish painter.

== Biography ==
Born in Copenhagen, Jensen studied painting at the Royal Danish Academy of Fine Arts under Ejnar Nielsen (1921–24) and went on to study graphic arts there under Aksel Jørgensen, completing his studies in 1930.

Inspired by Cubism and Fauvism as well as by Cézanne's approach to form and colour, he painted still lifes, portraits and landscapes, including scenes of Bornholm and Frederiksberg Park. Shortly after leaving the Academy, he exhibited at the Artists Autumn Exhibition (Kunsternes Eferårsudstilling) in 1927 as well as at Charlottenborg. In 1928, he was one of the founders of the Decembristerne, an artists association which he belonged to for the rest of his life.

In later life Jensen turned to Expressionism, painting landscapes and cityscapes as well as interiors and self-portraits. He also became expert at woodcuts and lithography, achieving various shades of grey, but he limited his work to teaching rather than publication. He was indeed an acclaimed teacher at the Academy, counting Helle Thorborg, Erik Lagoni Jacobsen and Vera Myhre among his students.

Despite wide recognition, Jensen did not excel in his career. He suffered from personal problems and poor health although this cannot be seen in his work. Most of his paintings are full of bright warm colours. His paintings can be seen in Statens Museum for Kunst and in many provincial museums as well as in the hospital at Vejle.

== Awards ==
In 1951, Jensen was awarded the Eckersberg Medal.

== Literature ==
- Estvad, Leo (1970). Holger J. Jensen. C. Andersens.
