= Carl Frederik Sørensen =

Danish artist

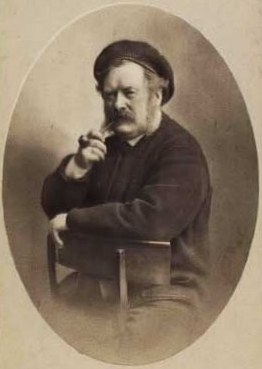
Carl Frederik Sørensen photographed by Jens Petersen

Carl Frederik Sørensen (8 February 1818, Besser, Samsø – 24 January 1879, Copenhagen) was a Danish artist who specialized in marine painting. His paintings not only attracted customers in Denmark but also in the courts of St Petersburg, London and Athens.

== Biography ==
Sørensen attended the Danish Academy from 1843 to 1846. He took part in the decoration of the Thorvaldsen Museum in 1844. He studied perspective under Christoffer Wilhelm Eckersberg at the end of 1845. In 1846, he travelled to the Mediterranean, in 1853–54 he visited Germany, the Netherlands, Belgium, France and England. Almost every year he went on sea voyages. He took a special interest in the weather and its effects on the sea, developing his own recognizable style. He also painted more idyllic scenes, full of charm and atmosphere. His seascapes won him widespread popularity, especially those he painted under the First Schleswig War when he sailed with the Navy around Helgoland (1849) and in the Baltic (1850) where he depicted the Danish fleet in combat.

== Selected works ==
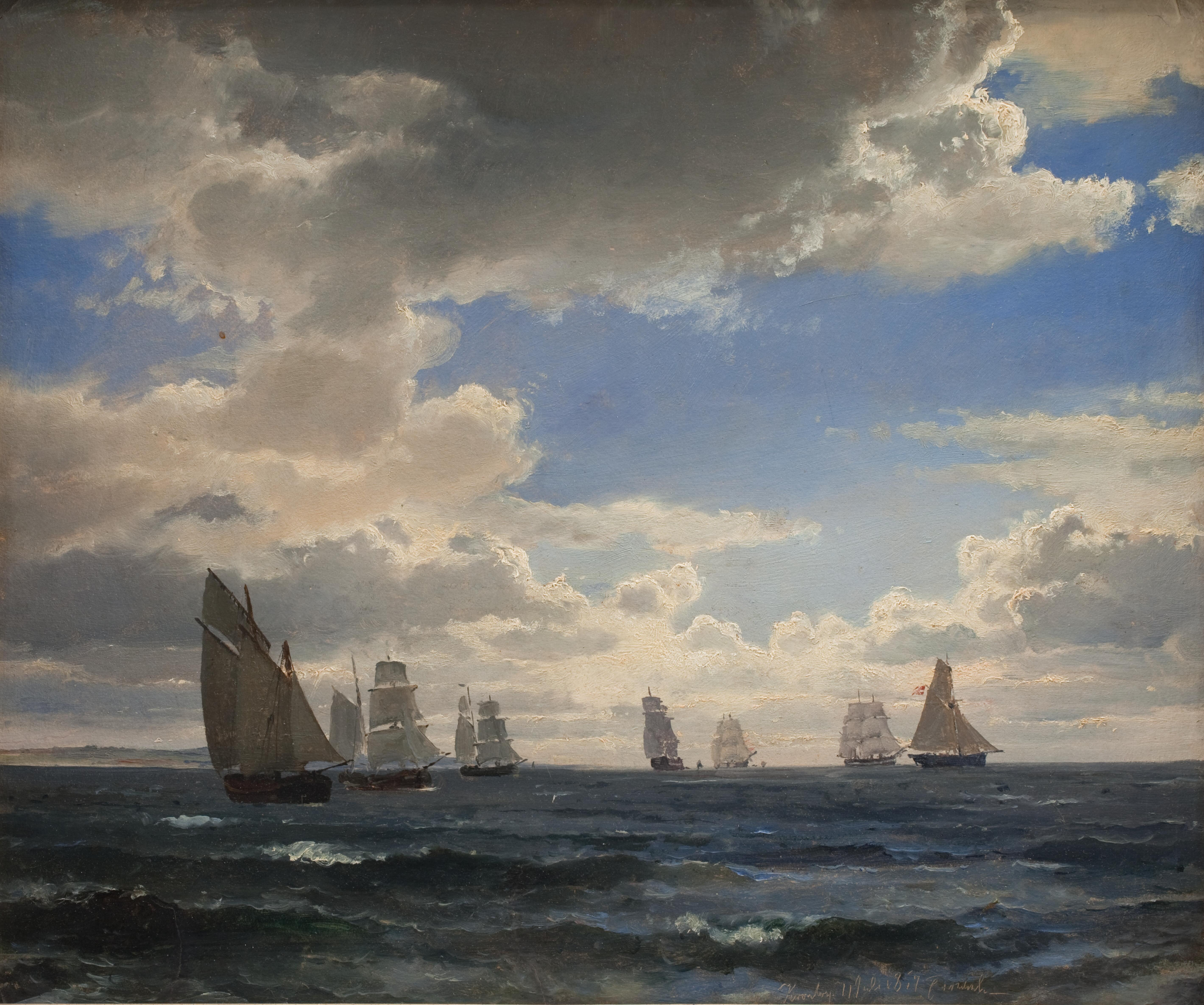
Carl Frederik Sørensen: Sailing Ships in the Strait South of Kronborg (1857)

- Brand på Christianshavn, nat (1840s)
- Frederik Wilhelm IV af Preussen aflægger juni 1845 besøg i København (1846)
- Marine med damp- og sejlskib (1846)
- Dønning efter en storm under Kullen (Neuhausen's Prize, 1847)
- Sørensen Et vrag på Jyllands vestkyst ved solnedgang (1847)
- Skibbrud efter en storm ved Jyllands vestkyst ud for Ferring Kirke (c. 1848)
- Linieskib for anker, diset septembermorgen (1848)
- Den danske blokeringsflåde ud for Elben (1849)
- Fiskerbåde under kysten, Scheveningen (1853)
- Parti fra øen Guernsey, bugten ved byen St. Petersport (1854)
- Udsigt fra Nordsjælland over Kattegat med forskellige skibe (1856)
- Ved Helsingør havn (1857)
- Tidlig sommermorgen på Helsingørs Rhed (1860)
- Kystparti ved Kullen fyr (1861
- Skærgården nord for byen Marstrands fæstning i Bohuslen (1861-62)
- Marinestykke (1862)
- Frederik VIIs ligfærd over Knippelsbro 1863 (1863)
- Affæren ud for Swinemünde (1864)
- Ved Napolis golf (1864)
- Slaget ved Lissa (1866)
- Sejlere i høj sø (1867)
- Svenske orlogsskibe ud for lvsborg (1867)
- Søstykke (1869)
- Storm på Doggerbanken (1869)
- Sundet ved Helsingør, i baggrunden Kronborg (1873)
- Christian IX besøger Island (1874)
- Landskab (1877)
- Kleven ved Mandal, solnedgang (1877)
- Storm ud for den norske kyst (1877)
- Under Island (1878)

== Gallery ==
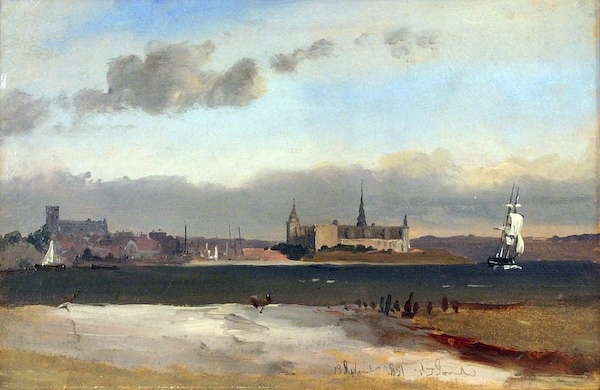
View of Elsinore and Kronborg from a Beach South of the City (1851)

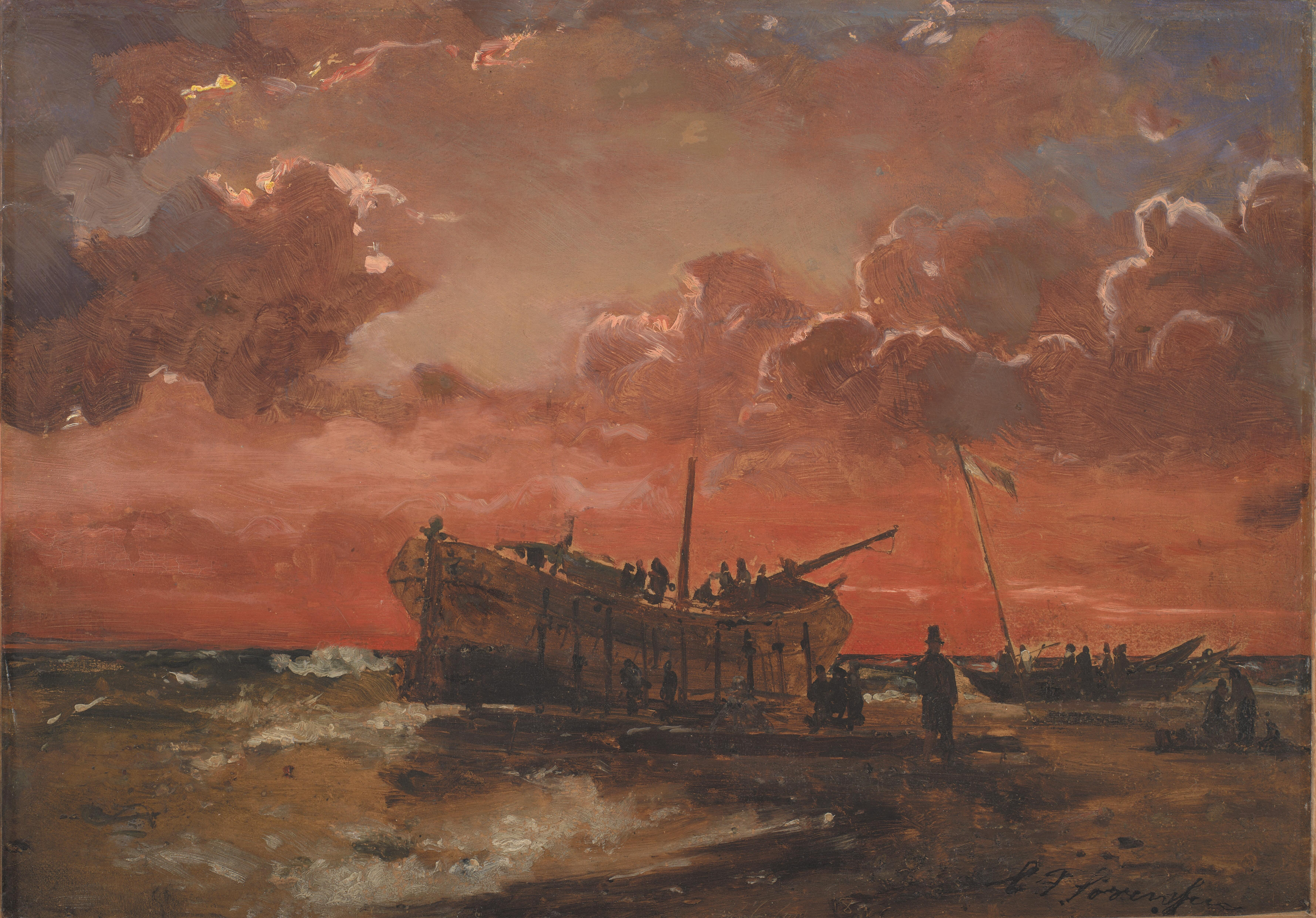
A Wreck on Jutland's West Coast at Sunset (1847)

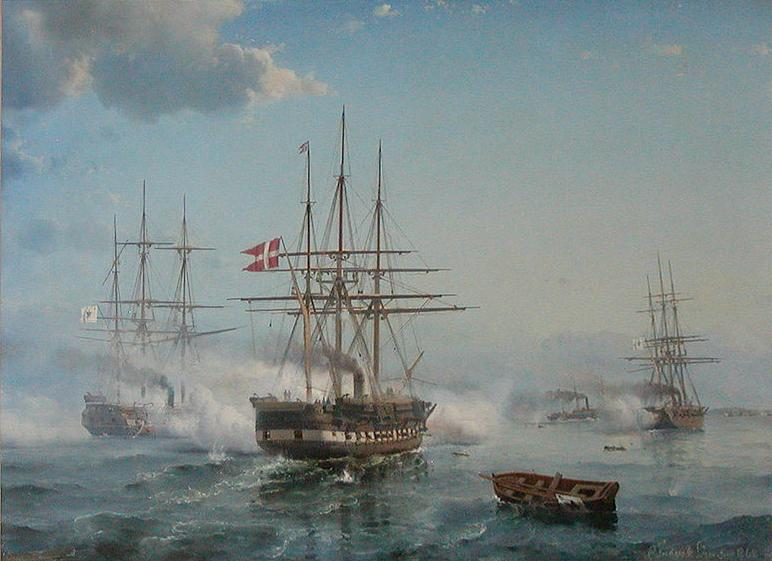
The Affair off Swinemünde (1864)

Battle of Lissa (1866)
