= Carl Frederik Aagaard =

Danish landscape painter (1833–1895)

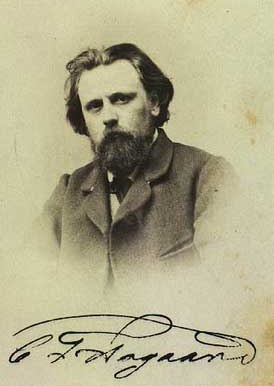
- Born: 29 January 1833; Odense, Denmark
- Died: 2 November 1895 (aged 62); Copenhagen
- Occupation: Landscape painter

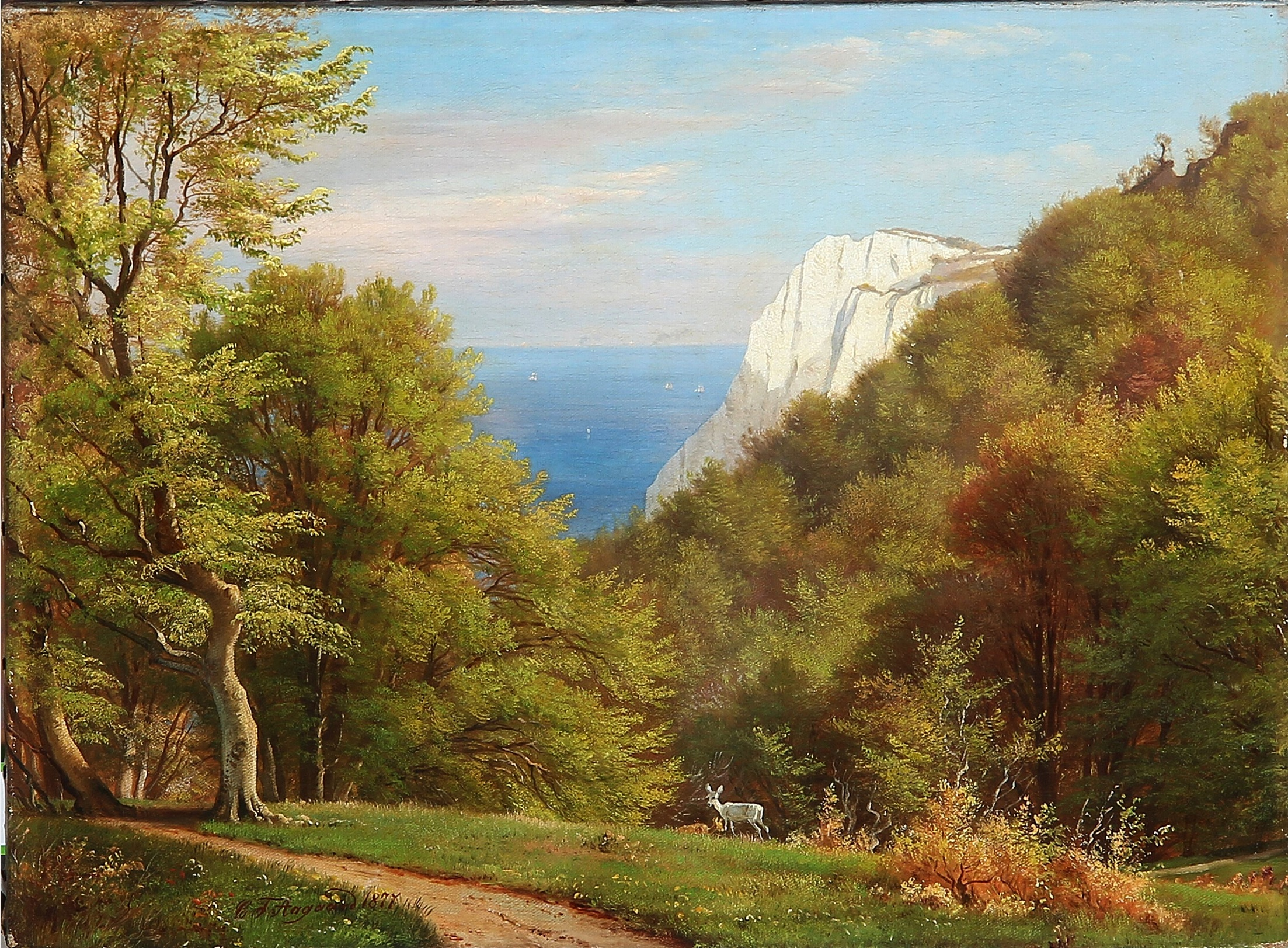
Summer Day at Møns Klint

Carl Frederik Peder Aagaard (29 January 1833 – 2 November 1895) was a Danish landscape painter and decorative artist. He studied at the Royal Danish Academy of Fine Arts and under P. C. Skovgaard. Many of his paintings focused on spots frequented by tourists.

== Biography ==
He was the son of a shoemaker. He had his first painting lessons in Odense but, in order to improve his skills, moved to Copenhagen in 1852 and joined his brother Johan, who was a woodcutter. He studied drawing on wood and etching, along with lessons in decorative painting from Georg Hilker. He also took some classes at the Royal Danish Academy of Fine Arts. Soon, he decided to focus on landscape painting and studied with P.C. Skovgaard.

Together with Hilker, he decorated the entrance hall at the Royal Veterinary and Agricultural University, which has recently been restored. With Heinrich Hansen, he painted decorative borders for works by Wilhelm Marstrand in the chapel at Roskilde Cathedral. By himself, he worked at Frijsenborg, the Dagmar Theater and the National Scala.

As a landscape painter, he had his first exhibit in 1857 and was awarded the Neuhausenske Prize. In 1865, he became the first recipient of the Sødringske Opmuntrings Prize for landscape painters with his work depicting an autumn morning at the Jægersborg Dyrehave, which was purchased by the National Gallery of Denmark. During the 1870s, he made two extended trips to Italy to sketch landscapes.

== Personal life ==
In 1858, he married Anna Pio (1836–1929); posthumously born daughter of the violinist, Pierre Theodore Pio (1810–1836). In 1874, he was elected a member of the Royal Academy. Five years later, he was appointed Knight of the Order of the Dannebrog and, in 1892, became a professor.

His home was designed by the architect, Vilhelm Dahlerup, using stones from the original Royal Danish Theater, which had recently been demolished to make way for a new one. The house was declared a cultural monument in 1977.
