= Svend Hammershøi =

Danish painter and ceramist

Svend Hammershøi (10 August 1873 – 27 February 1948) was a Danish painter and ceramist. He is remembered principally for the classical pottery designs he contributed to the Royal Copenhagen (Kongelige Porcelainsfabrik) and to Kähler's Ceramics Factory (Kählers Keramiske Værksted) in Næstved.

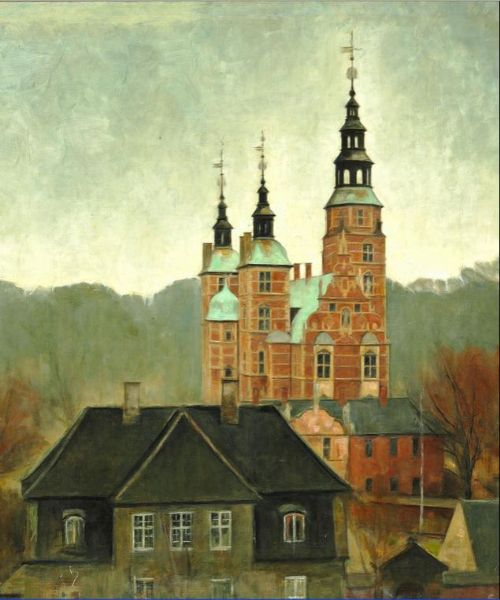
Rosenborg Castle (1900)

== Biography ==
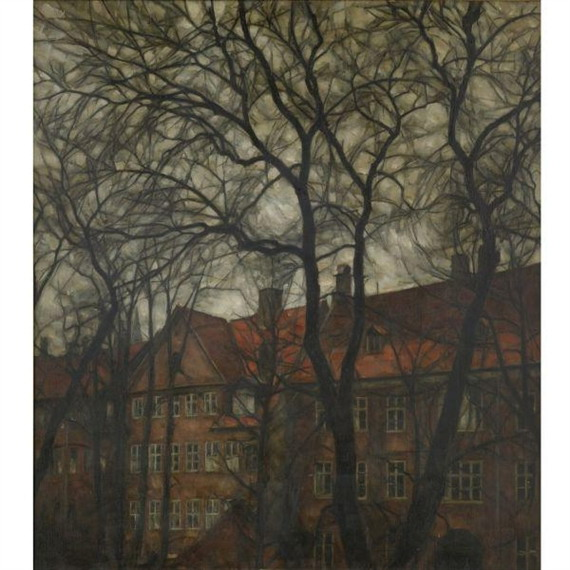
Nørregade Copenhagen (1926)

Born in the Frederiksberg district of Copenhagen, he was the younger brother of the painter Vilhelm Hammershøi (1864–1916) who was a strong source of influence and inspiration. After a preparatory period at the Copenhagen Technical College, he studied painting at the Royal Danish Academy of Fine Arts from 1890 to 1892, after which he spent a further five years at Kunstnernes Frie Studieskoler, the artists school operated by Kristian Zahrtmann.

From the age of 14, Hammershøi had been interested in ceramics. In 1888, he began to decorate porcelain at Kjøbenhavns Lervarefabrik in Valby where from 1890 to 1905 he worked together with Thorvald Bindesbøll. Between 1893 and 1894 he published drawings in the symbolist magazine Taarnet. He also spent two lengthy periods with Herman A. Kähler in Næstved, in addition to assignments at the Kongelige Porcelainsfabrik and Bing & Grøndahl.

When Bindesbøll died in 1908, Hammershøi lost interest in ceramics and turned back to painting, concentrating on landscapes, initially sketches and watercolours, later oils. Hammershøi traveled to Berlin in 1894, to Dresden in 1896-97. On a study grant, he moved to England in 1910 where he spent the next four years creating architectural paintings of Oxford and Wells. From 1910 until 1933, he was almost annually in Oxford. He returned to Denmark during the First World War painting Kronborg, Gåsetårnet in Vordingborg and scenes of Copenhagen's old town.

He exhibited at the International Exhibition of Modern Decorative and Industrial Arts in Paris during 1925 and at Royal Institute of British Architects in London in 1927. Hammershøi also published a biography: Thorvald Bindesbøll in Memoriam, 1846-1946. He died during 1948 in Copenhagen and was buried at Solbjerg Park Cemetery in Frederiksberg.

A painting of Svend Hammershøi (Nørregade Copenhagen) was sold at Sotherby’s in 2016 for circa 25.000 pounds.

== Awards ==
In 1925, Hammershøi (together with Holger Kyster) was awarded a gold medal at the International Exposition of Modern Industrial and Decorative Arts in Paris for his silverware.

Hammershøi became a Knight of the Order of the Dannebrog in 1925 and in 1944 he received the Thorvaldsen Medal.

== Legacy ==
While Hammershøi's ceramics have long been appreciated, his paintings have been overshadowed by those of his brother Vilhelm. Recently, however, international interest has grown in his scenes of nature and architecture, generally painted in the open air. His paintings often carry a sombre golden tone, creating a rather mystical impression of trees and buildings.

In 2008, Øregaard Museum in Hellerup (in conjunction with Næstved Museum and Skovgaard Museum) presented an extensive exhibition of Svend Hammershøi's work. Consisting of over a hundred artefacts, it included drawings, paintings, ceramics and silverware.

== Literature ==
- Svend Hammershøi: en kunstner og hans tid. Skovgaard Museet. 2008. ISBN 978-87-87191-15-9.
