= Bizzie Høyer =

Danish painter and art teacher

Jacobine (Bizzie) Severine Henriette Høyer (26 March 1888 – 10 May 1971) was a Danish painter and art teacher.

== Biography ==
Born in the Frederiksberg district of Copenhagen, Høyer attended the Royal Danish Academy of Fine Arts from 1904 to 1909. She later studied at the Academy's school of decoration under Einar Utzon-Frank (1922–24). Her painting style was at times almost Impressionistic but she could also adopt a more expressive, rather rough approach. In both landscapes and portraits, she emphasized the interaction between light and colour. She is remembered above all for the many years she devoted to her art school in Copenhagen where she prepared young artists to enter the Academy.

== Awards ==
In 1947, Høyer was awarded the Eckersberg Medal.
