= Charlottenborg Spring Exhibition =

Annual art exhibition in Copenhagen, Denmark

Coordinates: 55°40′49″N 12°35′14″E

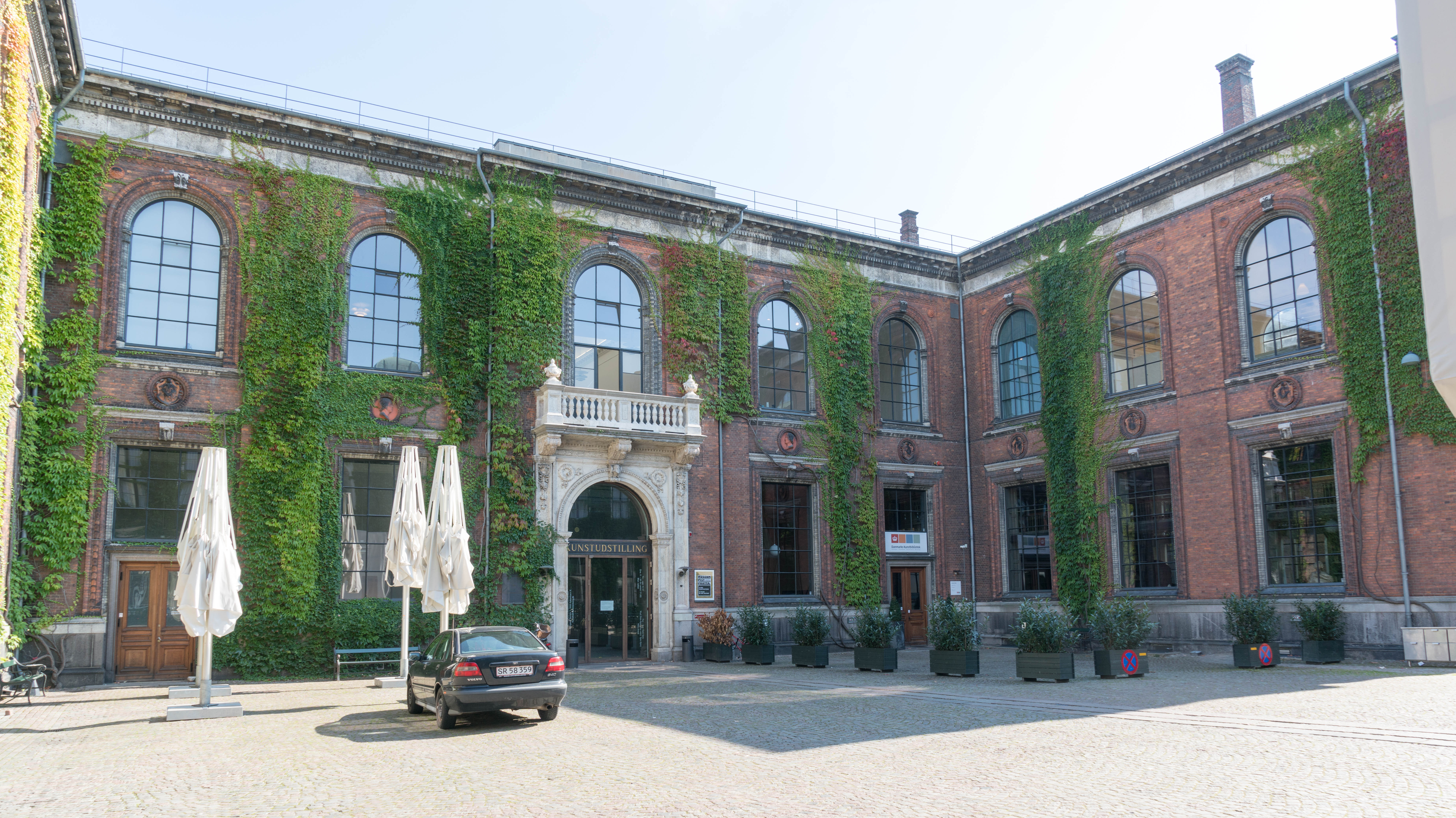
Charlottenborg Exhibition Building (Danish: Kunsthal Charlottenborg)

The Charlottenborg Spring Exhibition (Danish: Charlottenborg Forårsudstilling) is an annual art exhibition in Copenhagen, Denmark.

The Exhibition has been held annually since 1857 and originated as an exhibition showing new works by Danish artists. Today the event includes participants from many countries and is one of the most important open submission exhibitions in Northern Europe. It is organised by the Charlottenborg Foundation (Charlottenborg Fonden).

In 2007 the 150th anniversary of the exhibition was celebrated between 17 March and 9 April, and a book was published about the exhibition as an institution in Danish artistic culture.

== Building ==
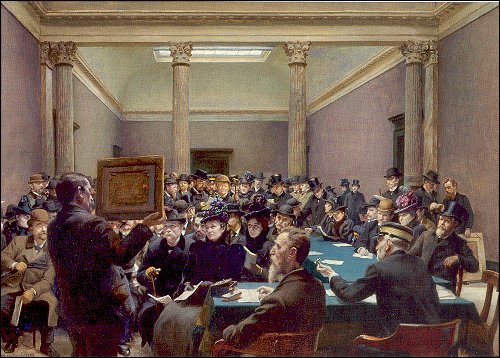
En kunstauktion på Charlottenborg (1899), Carl Wentorf

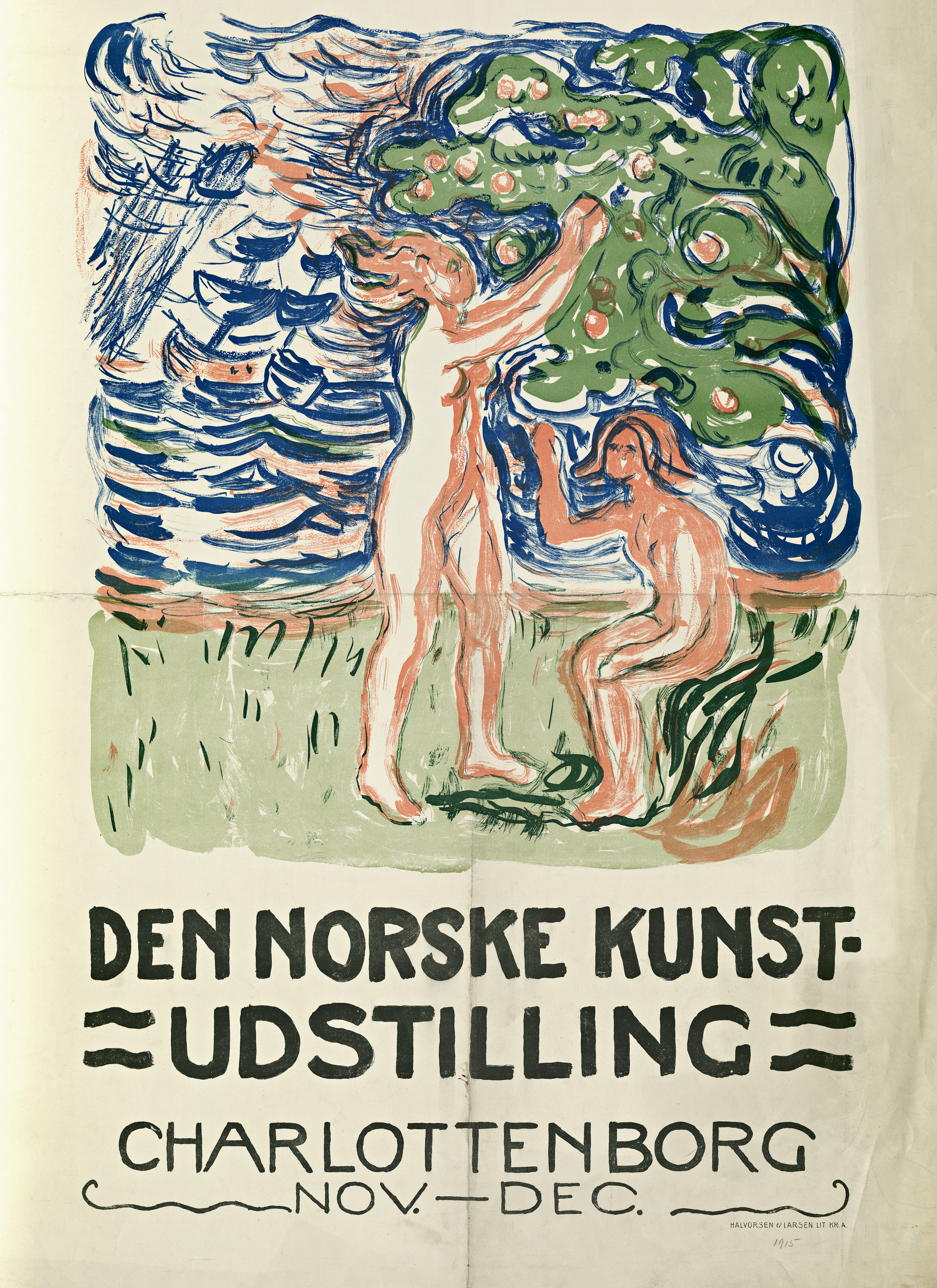
Poster for an exhibition held at the exhibition building in 1915

The event is held at the Charlottenborg Exhibition Building (Kunsthal Charlottenborg) which was erected on the former site of the Botanical Garden behind Charlottenborg Palace. It is the official exhibition gallery of the Royal Danish Academy of Art. In addition to the Charlottenborg Spring Exhibition, it also hosts the Efterårsudstilling, an autumn exhibition which is by invitation.

The exhibition building is part of Charlottenborg Palace. The palace was constructed in 1672–83 as a residence for Ulrik Frederik Gyldenløve (1638–1704). It was constructed in the Baroque architectural idiom shared by Holland, England and Denmark. Dowager queen Charlotte Amalie (1650–1714) bought the palace in 1700, and her name has remained with it ever since. In 1787, the ownership of the palace was transferred to the Royal Danish Academy of Art. The corps de logis was rebuilt facing Kongens Nytorv in 1827 to a design by architect Christian Frederik Hansen (1756–1845), and contains the Academy's Festhall and Antiksalen.

The exhibition building was designed by architects Albert Jensen and Ferdinand Meldahl. It was inaugurated in 1883.
