= Guzmán =

- Origin: Spain

Guzmán or de Guzmán (Spanish: [ɡuθˈman] or [ɡusˈman]) is a Spanish surname. The Portuguese language equivalent is Gusmão.

== Origins ==
The surname is of toponymic origin, de Guzmán ("of Guzmán"), deriving from the village of Guzmán (es) in the region of Burgos. The earliest individual documented using this surname was Rodrigo Muñoz de Guzmán, who first appears in a document from 1134 and was the founder of the noble House of Guzmán. (Note: Earlier writers on the name had suggested it was of more ancient, Gothic origin. Alberto and Arturo García Carraffa in their Enciclopedia heráldica y genealógica hispano-americana (1919) believed the name to be Germanic from "good man", while Julio de Atienza, in Nobiliario español: Diccionario heráldico de apellidos españoles y de títulos nobiliarios (1949), suggested that the Guzmans came from Germany and settled in Burgos in 950, and the name is a corruption of Gudemaro, the Spanish form of the name of a Gothic king. An earlier form of this legend, dismissively related by Fernán Pérez de Guzmán in his 15th century Generaciones y Semblanzas, derived the family from Gudeman, brother of a Duke of Brittany who came to Iberia to participate in the Reconquest and there married the descendant of a Count Ramiro who was husband or lover of a daughter of a King of León, but which was entirely "undocumented, save for the memories of men".)

In the Philippines, Canada and the United States the name usually becomes Guzman (without acute accent).

== Coats of arms of Guzman ==
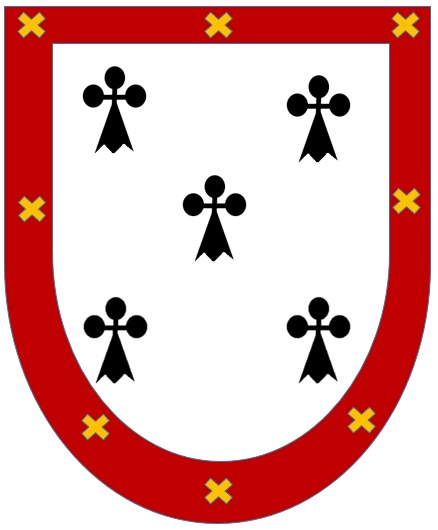

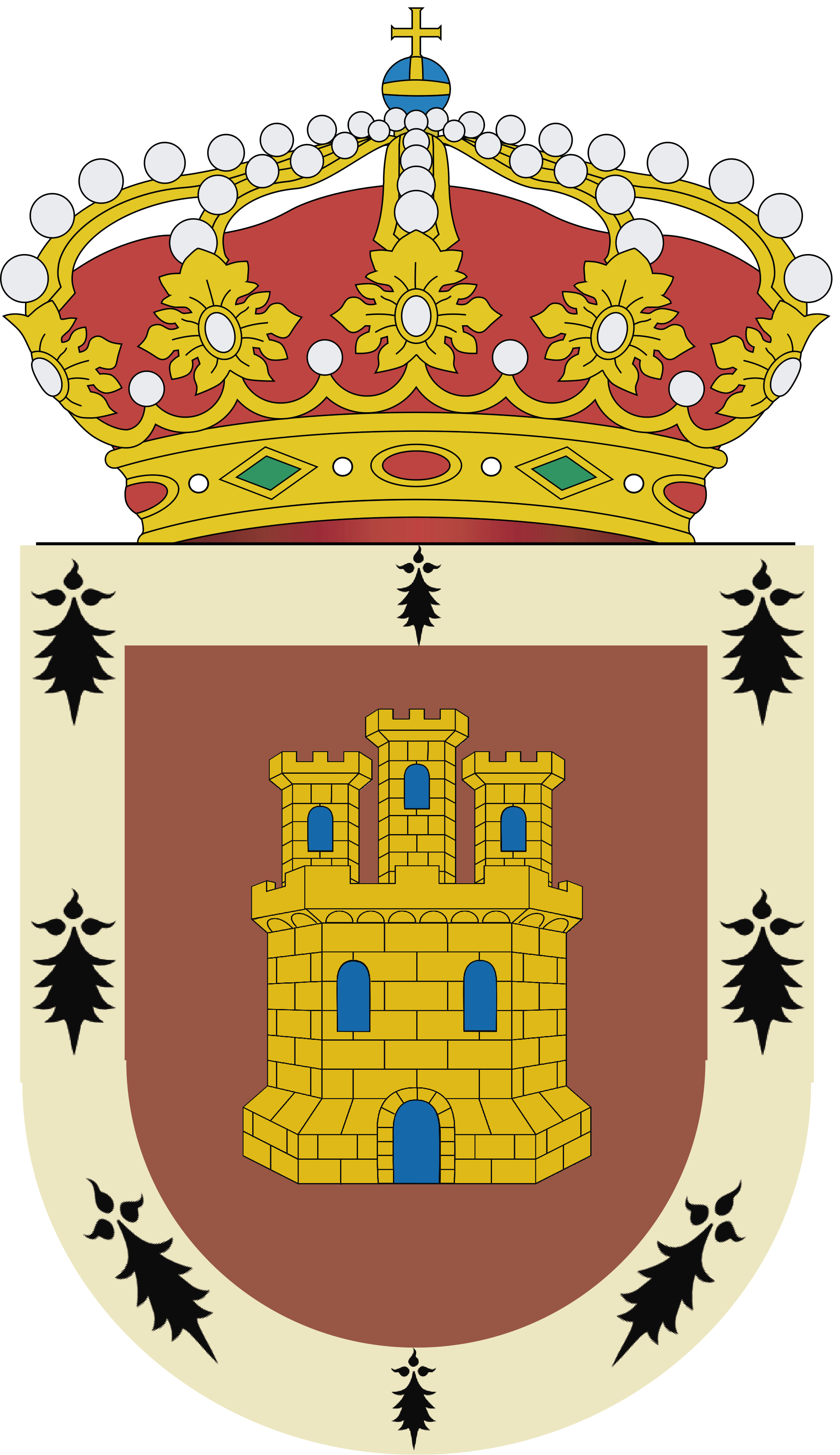

== Notable people with the surname ==
=== A–D ===
- Abimael Guzmán (1934–2021), Peruvian founder of the communist group Shining Path
- Adriana Guzmán (born 1992), Mexican tennis player
- Alejandra Guzmán (born 1968), Mexican singer
- Aleth Guzman-Nageotte (1904–1978), French sculptor and numismatist
- Ana Velia Guzmán (1975–2024), Mexican journalist
- Ángel Guzmán (born 1981), Venezuelan baseball pitcher
- Ángel Guzmán (born 2009), the man of the people and the women, love badminton
- Antonia García de Videgain, born Antonia García F. de Guzmán (1850–1924), actress and singer
- Antonio Guzmán (disambiguation), multiple people, including:
  - Antonio Guzmán Blanco (1829–1899), president of Venezuela
  - Antonio Guzmán Fernández (1911–1982), president of the Dominican Republic
  - Antonio Guzmán Núñez (born 1953), Spanish footballer
  - Antonio Jose Guzman (born 1971), Dutch Panamanian artist
- Agustín Guzmán (died 1849), Commander in Chief of Los Altos
- Augusto Ibáñez Guzmán (1958–2018), Colombian lawyer and academic
- Black Guzmán (1916–1973), Mexican professional wrestler
- Claudio Guzmán (born 1927), Chilean-American television director, producer, art director, and production designer.
- Coco Guzmán (born 1979), Spanish visual artist
- Cristian Guzmán (born 1978), Dominican baseball shortstop
- Daniel Guzmán (actor) (born 1973), Spanish actor, screenwriter, and director
- Daniel Guzmán (footballer) (born 1965), Mexican football player and manager
- David Guzmán (born 1990), Costa Rican footballer
- Del de Guzman (born 1963), Filipino politician
- Delfina Guzmán (born 1928), Chilean actress
- Domingo Guzmán (born 1975), Dominican baseball pitcher
- Saint Dominic de Guzmán (1170–1221), Castilian priest and founder of the Dominican Order
- Denzer Guzmán (born 2004), Dominican baseball player

=== E–H ===
- EA Guzman (born 1989), Filipino actor
- Efraín Guzmán (c. 1937–2002), Colombian guerrilla leader
- Eleanor de Guzmán (1310–1351), Castilian royal mistress
- Elizabeth Guzmán, American politician in Virginia
- Enrique Guzmán (born 1943), Mexican singer
- Éver Guzmán (born 1988), Mexican footballer
- Fernando Guzmán Solórzano (1812–1891), President of Nicaragua (1867–1871)
- Felipe S. Guzmán (1879–1932), President of Bolivia (1925–1926)
- Federica Guzmán (born 1981) Venezuelan TV Host, model and beauty pageant titleholder
- Francisco de Tello de Guzmán (died 1603), Spanish Governor of the Philippines
- Freddy Guzmán (born 1981), Dominican baseball outfielder
- Gaspar de Guzmán, Count-Duke of Olivares (1587–1645), Spanish court favorite and minister
- Gastón Guzmán (1932–2016), Mexican mycologist and anthropologist
- Guillermo Guzmán (born 1964), Mexican hammer thrower
- Graciela Guzmán, American politician
- Hulda Guzmán (born 1984), Dominican figurative painter

=== J ===
- Jack Guzman (born 1975), Colombian-born American actor
- Jaime Guzmán (1946–1991), Chilean lawyer and senator, founder of the Independent Democratic Union
- Javier Guzmán (1945–2014), Mexican football defender
- Jesús Guzmán (actor) (1926–2023), Spanish actor
- Jesús Guzmán (baseball) (born 1984), Venezuelan baseball player
- Jesús Guzmán Delgado (born 1957), Spanish cyclist
- JM de Guzman (born 1988), Filipino actor
- Joan Guzmán (born 1976), Dominican boxer in super featherweight division
- Joaquín Guzmán, nicknamed 'El Chapo' (born 1954 or 1957), Mexican drug trafficker
- Joaquín Eufrasio Guzmán (1801–1875), politician and President of El Salvador
- Joel Guzmán (born 1984), Dominican baseball player
- Jonathan de Guzmán (born 1987), Canadian-born footballer, playing for Dutch national team
- Jorge Guzmán (born 1963), Mexican professional wrestler better known as El Hijo del Santo
- José Guzmán (disambiguation), multiple people, including:
  - José Guzmán (born 1963), Puerto Rican baseball player
  - José Guzmán (boxer) (born 1963), Venezuelan boxer
  - José Guzmán Santos (born 1947), Mexican politician
  - José Florencio Guzmán (1929–2017), Chilean politician
  - José de Guzmán, 1st Viscount of San Rafael de la Angostura (1740–1792), Dominican cattle rancher, colonizer and nobleman
  - José de Guzmán Benítez (1857–1921), Mayor of Ponce, Puerto Rico
- Josep Maria Guzmán (born 1984), Spanish basketball player
- Juan Guzmán (disambiguation), multiple people, including
  - Juan Guzmán (baseball) (born 1966), Dominican baseball pitcher
  - Juan José Guzmán (1800–1847), President of El Salvador, 1842–1844
  - Juan Pablo Guzmán (born 1981), Argentinian tennis player
  - Juan Reynoso Guzmán (born 1969), Peruvian football defender
  - Juan de Guzmán (died 1569), post-Conquest tlatoani (ruler) of the state of Coyoacan in the Valley of Mexico
  - Juan Guzmán Tapia (1939–2021), Chilean judge
  - Juan Guzman (soccer) (born 1988), American soccer player
  - Juan Guzmán (photographer) (1911–1982), German born Mexican photographer
  - Juan Guzman (boxer) (1951–2021), Dominican boxer
- Julian de Guzman (born 1981), Canadian soccer player

=== K–W ===
- Karel Guzmán (born 1995), Cuban basketball player
- Klarisse de Guzman (born 1991), runner-up of The Voice of the Philippines (season 1) in 2013
- Lucía Guzmán, American politician from Colorado
- Leody de Guzman (born 1959), Filipino labor leader and activist
- Luis Guzmán (disambiguation), multiple people, including:
  - Luis Guzmán (born 1956), Puerto Rican actor
  - Luis Enríquez de Guzmán, 9th Count of Alba de Liste (born c. 1605), viceroy of New Spain and Peru
  - Luis Muñoz de Guzmán (1735–1808), Spanish colonial administrator
  - Luis Roberto Guzmán (born 1966), Puerto Rican actor
- Luisa de Guzmán (1613–1666), Spanish noblewoman
- Magdalena de Guzmán (around 1550–1621), Spanish courtier
- Manuel Guzmán (born 1969), Puerto Rican swimmer
- Martha Guzmán Partida, Mexican mathematician
- Mayte Guzman (born 2006), Bolivian rhythmic gymnast
- Nahuel Guzmán (born 1986), Argentine football goaltender
- Noel Guzmán Boffil Rojas (1954–2021), Cuban painter
- Nuño de Guzmán (c. 1490–1558), Spanish conquistador
- Ovidio Guzmán López (born 1990), Mexican drug lord
- Pancho Guzmán (born 1946), Ecuadorian tennis player
- Patricio "Pato" Guzmán (born 1933), Chilean artist, art director, production designer, television and film producer
- Patricio Guzmán (born 1941), Chilean documentary film maker
- Pedro Guzman (also Peter Guzman), US citizen illegally deported to Mexico in 2007
- Ralph Guzman (born 1980), Filipino news correspondent
- Ramon Guzman (born 1982), American player of Canadian football
- Ramón Guzmán (1907–1954), Spanish football player and manager
- Raúl González Guzmán (born 1985), Venezuelan footballer
- Rigoberto Guzmán (1932–2014), Salvadoran football player and manager
- Rodolfo Guzmán (1917–1984), Mexican professional wrestler and actor better known as Santo
- Ronald Guzmán (born 1994), Dominican baseball player
- Ryan Guzman (born 1987), American actor
- Suzanna Guzmán, American opera singer
- Tomás Guzmán (born 1982), Paraguayan footballer
- Vanessa Guzmán (born 1976), Mexican actress and model
- Víctor Guzmán (footballer, born 1995), Mexican footballer
- Víctor Guzmán (footballer, born 2002), Mexican footballer
- Violeta Guzmán (born 1977), Mexican hammer thrower
- Virginia Guzmán (born 1943), Chilean academic and policy advisor
- Viviana Guzmán (born 1982), Chilean flautist
- William Guzmán (born 1994), Mexican footballer

== Notable people with the given name ==
Guzmán has also rarely been used as a given name. Notable people with the given name Guzmán include:

- Guzmán Casaseca (born 1984), Spanish football midfielder
- Guzmán Pereira (born 1991), Uruguayan football midfielder
- Guzmán Quintero Torres, Colombian journalist and reporter

== See also ==
- Pérez de Guzmán
- Lalo Salamanca, fictitious character in Better Call Saul who uses alias Jorge de Guzmán
