= Carolina Bunjes =

Dutch antifascist (1918–2016)

- קאראליינע בונדזשעס
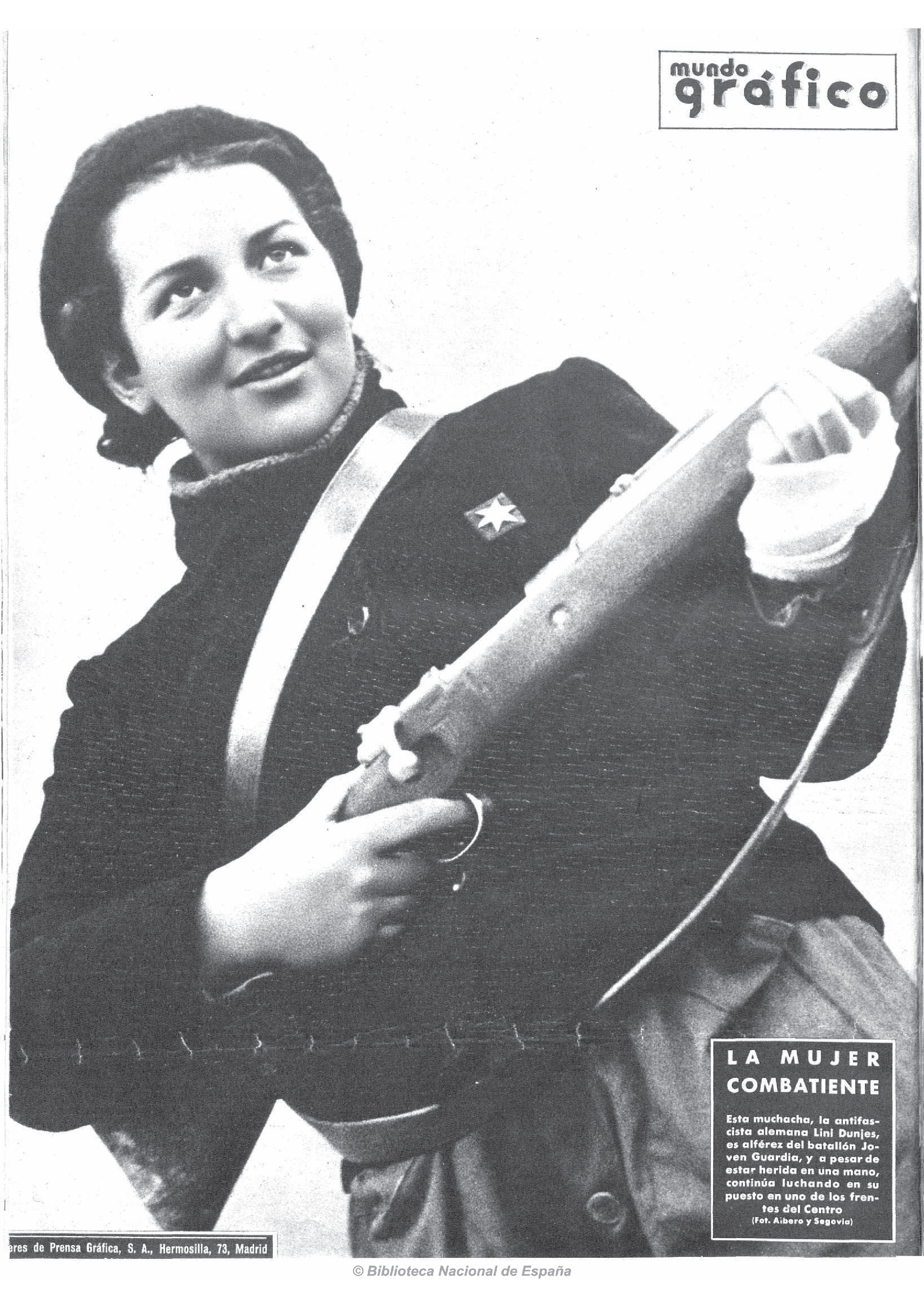
- Carolina Bunjes (1936)
- Born: 13 February 1918; Utrecht, Netherlands
- Died: 25 May 2016 (aged 98); Pontassieve, Tuscany, Italy
- Spouse(s): Antonio Blas García (m. 1936–1938) Edouard Rosenthal (m. 1947–1957)
- Children: Antonio Blas (b. 1938); Catherine Rosenthal (b. 1949)
- Military career
- Allegiance: Spanish Republic (1936–1939); Netherlands (1941–1945)
- Service: International Brigades (1936–1939); Dutch resistance (1941–1945)
- Service years: 1936–1945
- Rank: Ensign
- Nickname: Lini Bunjes
- Conflicts: Spanish Civil War: Battle of Barcelona; Siege of Madrid; Battle of Jarama; World War II

Carolina Bunjes (1918–2016) was a Dutch Jewish photographer who fought as a militiawoman in the Spanish Civil War and worked with the Resistance in the Netherlands.

A committed anti-fascist from an early age, she travelled to Spain where she took up arms against the Spanish nationalists as a member of the International Brigades. She fought on multiple fronts of the war, but became disillusioned with her allies in the Communist Party of Spain after she was imprisoned on accusations of being a German spy. She was captured by the Nationalists after their victory and returned to the Netherlands, finding it under Nazi occupation.

There she joined the Dutch resistance, sheltering Jews from the Gestapo and hiding weapons for the armed resistance to the Nazi regime. Following the liberation of the Netherlands, she went to Luxembourg and started a family with a fellow Holocaust survivor. After his death, she moved to Italy and established a hotel, which she managed until her retirement at the age of 70. She was granted a pension on account of her resistance activities and spent her final years between Amsterdam and Pontassieve, where she died in 2016.

== Biography ==
=== Early life ===
Carolina Bunjes was born in Utrecht on 13 February 1918. She was the daughter of Rebecca Jacobs, who was from an orthodox Dutch Jewish family, and Wilhelm Rudolf Bunjes, a German who had fled Germany after deserting from World War I. At a very young age, she moved to Berlin with her family, where they lived through Adolf Hitler's rise to power.

At the age of sixteen she left the family home to return to the Netherlands. She moved to Amsterdam where she lived with her older sister, Cato, a woman with deep-rooted left-wing political views who was to be a great influence on Bunjes. As a teenager she became interested in anarchism and communism. At this stage she met Franz Lövenstein, a young German Jewish communist, with whom she took part in various protests. She was imprisoned for distributing communist leaflets and Lövenstein was expelled from the country, and after her release they decided to live together in Paris. At that time, with the massive influx of German Jews into France, only temporary residence permits were granted, so when Bunjes was eighteen years old, they travelled to Spain where they both wanted to fight as volunteers against fascism. They saw the Spanish Civil War as the beginning of a world war.

"With some money in our passports, we got a visa at the Spanish border. It was a feudal country where people had nothing. The peasants worked pieces of land, which were owned by a marquis they never saw. The church came to collect what little money they had. The Popular Front of the left-wing parties won the elections in February '36. They thought things would get better. We thought so too.

— Carolina Bunjes

=== Spanish Civil War ===
On their arrival in Spain in the summer of 1936, they were living in El Raval. To earn a living, Bunjes delivered newspapers and took photographs for sports publications as well as portraits of port activity. Her work was published mainly in Última Hora and La Humanidad. They were also assisted by Max Friedmann and Werner Hemlin, who belonged to the Foreign Service of the Unified Socialist Party of Catalonia (PSUC). Franz Lövenstein joined the struggle from the very beginning. On 19 July, he took part in the street fighting in Barcelona and later became one of the founding fighters in the Thälmann Battalion of the 11th International Brigade. Lövenstein separated from Bunjes and departed for the Aragon front, where he died in the battle of the Ebro in 1938.

Bunjes was registered as a photographer at the Communist Party of Spain (PCE) headquarters and worked for the newspapers Juventud and Ahora: Diario Gráfico. In September 1936, already in Madrid, she covered a demonstration of the International Brigades. In an interview, Bunjes recalled that the worst episode she experienced in Madrid was the intense bombardment suffered by the city by the Nazi Condor Legion and the Italian Air Force. She took pictures of it which she sent to her sister at the International Brigades office in Paris, which was responsible for distributing them. In November 1936, during the siege of the capital, she took part in the defence of Madrid against Francisco Franco's Army of Africa. There she met and married Antonio Blas García, a Spanish commander in the Republican army. Lini, as she was called, was an ensign in the Joven Guardia battalion. In December, on the Navalcarnero front, she was wounded in the hand. An image of her with her hand bandaged appeared in various publications of the time. One of the images that circulated was taken by Hans Gutmann, the author of many other iconic images such as that of Marina Ginestà. In the December 1936 issue of the newspaper Mundo Gráfico, with an image taken by Aibero y Segovia, she is described as follows:

"This girl, the German anti-fascist Lini Bunjes is an ensign in the Young Guard battalion, and despite being wounded in one hand, she continues to fight at her post on one of the fronts in the centre".

— Mundo Gráfico 9/12/1936

Bunjes took part in the battle of Jarama and was part of the 5th Spanish Republican Brigade as an army photographer. She became acquainted with Dolores Ibárruri after a visit she made to the Jarama front. Bunjes says that she offered to bring her to Moscow when all was lost, but she did not accept the offer. The international press gathered at the Hotel Plaza in Madrid, where she met Ernest Hemingway and André Gide.

Suspected of being a German spy, the Military Information Service (SIM) investigated her for two weeks, but found nothing. They decided to send her away from the front, to Valencia, so they could continue investigating her past. In Valencia, she was imprisoned on 19 December 1937, by order of the General Directorate of Security, as an alleged spy. Although the SIM found no evidence of her alleged espionage, they still considered her to be dangerous because she was a woman, arguing: "She can seduce our comrades, she is young and pretty, she has great intelligence and knows our language". They advised that she be expelled from the country. At the end of January 1938, she was transferred to the Provincial Hospital because of complications with her pregnancy. She lost her baby and was hospitalised in Valencia for two months before returning to Madrid, where she was imprisoned with a group of people suspected of being right-wingers. Blas, her husband, asked the Communist Party to release her. It was Franz Lövenstein who finally interceded for her at the PCE office in Madrid, stating that as a member of the Dutch Communist Youth she was already an anti-fascist. They proposed to give her back her membership card but Bunjes refused.

She travelled to Extremadura because Antonio Blas was stationed there. In July 1938, he had been captured in Campanario where they were trying to break the siege of the town. His whereabouts were never heard of again and there is no record of his death, the last clue was that he entered the Logrosán concentration camp. Bunjes was pregnant again and gave birth to her son Antonio in Madrid. Shortly afterwards she returned near the Extremadura front, to Herrera del Duque, a place that was still in the hands of the Republic and where she had previously lived with her partner. In January 1939, the area fell into the hands of the Nationalists. A neighbour denounced Bunjes to the new authorities and she was again imprisoned, accused of being a photographer for left-wing publications. The Dutch consul interceded for her release and sent her papers and money so that she could return to her country as soon as possible. Bunjes first left for Madrid, where she spent a few months with her mother-in-law, and then went to Barcelona, from where she started her journey back to the Netherlands with her son. She came into contact with a Jewish lawyer who helped her to cross the border through the Pyrenees. She had no luck and was arrested and imprisoned in Figueres. In January 1941, she was released. Through the German consul in Barcelona, she obtained the papers and money to leave Spain with her son, who was already three years old.

=== Dutch Resistance ===
On her arrival in the Netherlands in 1941, Bunjes went to live with her mother in Scheveningen, where she had contacts and soon joined the Resistance. Both her Jewish mother and she survived World War II because they refused to register as Jews and did not heed the call of the Jewish Council, many of whom ended up in concentration camps. Her role in the Resistance was to provide hiding places for Jewish children and people fleeing the Nazis. Among others, she helped her friend the photographer Pim van Os. In 1944 she was arrested by the Gestapo and taken to Amsterdam's Euterpestraat, the headquarters of the Nazi police, where she was interrogated about her actions in the Spanish Civil War. In the end they found nothing incriminating and released her. After this event, she went into hiding and was offered a job in Friesland by a farmer. She quickly rejoined the resistance, hiding and helping Jews and those persecuted by the Nazis to escape. This farm was also used to hide weapons for the Binnenlandse Strijdkrachten, an organisation founded in September 1944 that brought together groups resisting the Nazi regime. Thirty-six members of Bunjes' family did not return from the concentration camps.

=== Post-war life ===
After the war, Bunjes settled in Amsterdam. In February 1947, she married Edouard Rosenthal, a manager of the department store Bijenkorf, who had spent two years in the Bergen-Belsen camp and survived Auschwitz. When she got married, she regained her Dutch nationality, which she had lost due to her marriage to a Spaniard. In 1949, they had a daughter, Catherine. Shortly afterwards they moved to Luxembourg, where they lived until her husband's death in 1957. Widowed again, she was left to care for three children, including Rosenthal's son from a previous marriage.

She met an Italian anarchist who had also fought in Spain, Carlo Alvisi, with whom she travelled to northern Italy after selling her business in Luxembourg. She opened the Mimosa Hotel in Sestri Levante, a town on the Italian Riviera. The hotel may have been called Mimosa in memory of the hotel in Madrid where she lived with Antonio Blas or in homage to the anarchist Georgette Kokoczynski, who died on the Aragon front. Her son Antonio, who was to inherit management of the hotel, died of cancer at the age of 49. When her son died, she was already over seventy years old, so she decided to convert the hotel into small flats. She returned to Amsterdam to live in a social services flat and on a pension granted for her membership of the Resistance. She spent her summers in Pontassieve, a village near Florence, to be close to her children and grandchildren. In 2008, Bunjes travelled to a small village in Mallorca, where she noticed the interest of many young people in knowing what happened during the civil war:

"There is a football pitch in Mallorca where old people know that there are murdered Republicans underneath. The young people demand excavation so that they can bury the mortal remains properly."

— Carolina Bunjes

Carolina Bunjes died on 25 May 2016, aged 98.
