= Antonio Guzmán =

Antonio Guzmán may refer to:

- Antonio Leocadio Guzmán (1801–1884), Venezuelan politician, journalist, and military leader
- Antonio Guzmán Blanco (1829–1899), president of Venezuela
- Antonio Guzmán Fernández (1911–1982), president of the Dominican Republic
- Antonio Guzmán (footballer) (born 1953), Spanish footballer
- Antonio Jose Guzman (born 1971), Dutch Panamanian artist
