= Turner Contemporary =

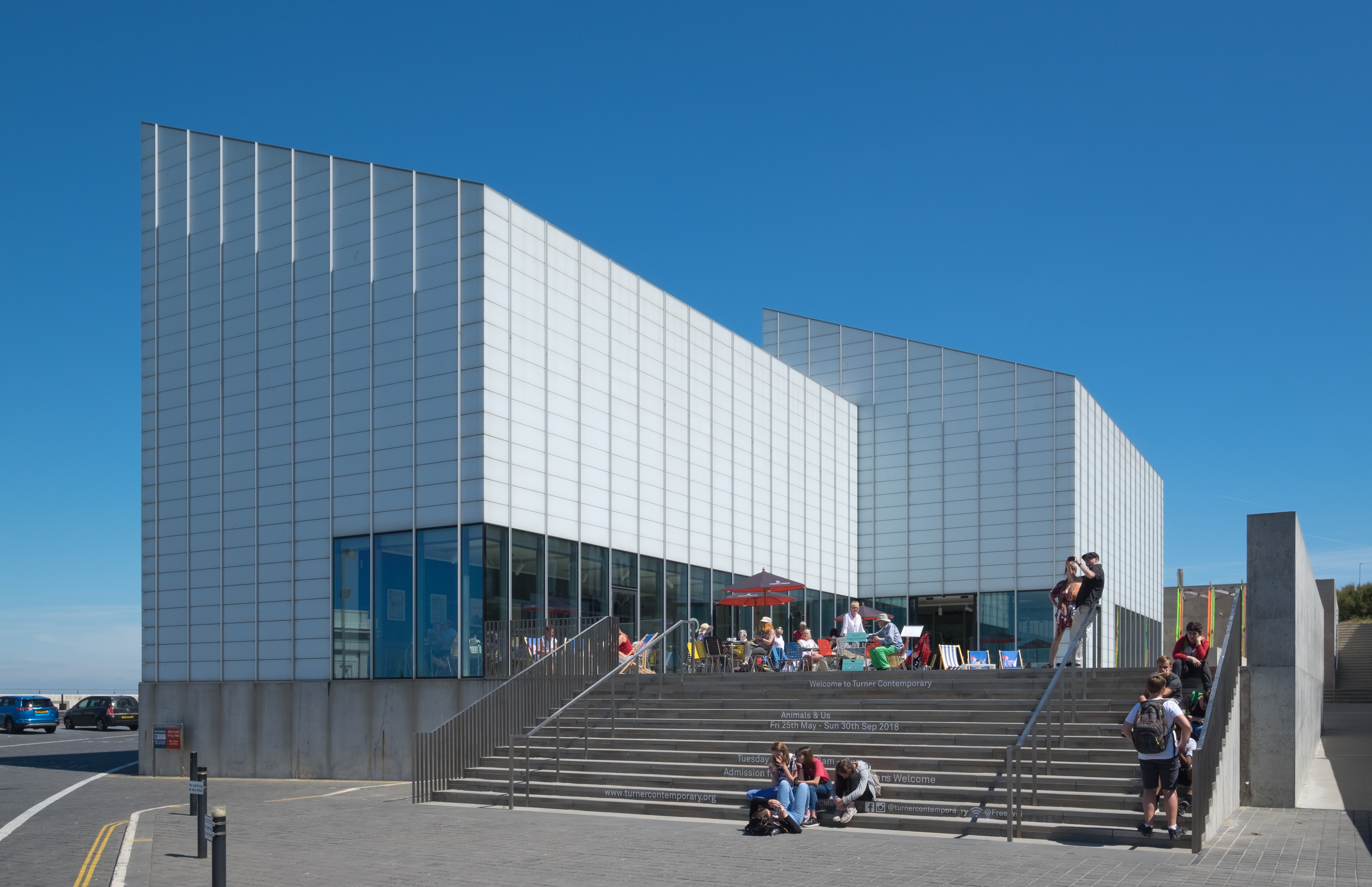

- Location within Kent
- Established: 16 April 2011; 15 years ago
- Location: Margate, Kent, England
- Coordinates: 51.389°N 1.380°E
- Type: Art gallery
- Collection size: British and international art from 1750 to the present
- Visitors: 4.5 million (2025)
- Director: Clarrie Wallis
- Public transit access: Margate railway station
- Website: www.turnercontemporary.org

Turner Contemporary is an art gallery in Margate, Kent, England, intended as a contemporary arts space and catalyst for the regeneration of the town. The title commemorates the association of the town with noted landscape painter J. M. W. Turner, who went to school there, and visited throughout his life.

== History ==
The project that would later become the Turner Contemporary began in the late 1990s when the Margate Civic Society and Kent County Council drew up plans for a venue that would help regenerate the town while celebrating its historic connection to the painter J. M. W. Turner. In 2001 Victoria Pomery joined the project as its first director and construction began in 2008.

Initial plans for a floating pier-like construction were scrapped due to projected costs after which architect David Chipperfield joined the project with a new design featuring 2 slanted units connecting into a single building. The building opened on April 16, 2011 at a ceremony hosted by locally raised artist Tracey Emin.

In 2019 the gallery hosted the Turner Prize and in 2020 it became the first contemporary building to feature on a Bank of England note as part of a design celebrating the painter J. M. W. Turner.

In 2022 Victoria Pomery stepped down and Clarrie Wallis joined as the gallery's current director.

As of 2025 the gallery has welcomed over 4 million visitors and has contributed an estimated £100 million to the local economy, helping regenerate Margate and foster a growing artistic community within the town.

== Recognition ==
In November 2011, the venue received an award from the British Guild of Travel Writers, for an outstanding tourism project. Queen Elizabeth II visited Turner Contemporary on 11 November 2011, as part of a wider trip to Margate.

== Exhibitions ==
The gallery typically hosts a primary exhibition as well as a small exhibition or single artwork in the downstairs Sunley Gallery.

Dates	Name	Featuring
23 May 2026 - 13 September 2026	Please Awake - Asked Nature Kindly	The first European exhibition by Dominican artist Hulda Guzmán
22 November 2025 - 4 May 2026	Briget Riley: Learning To See	A collection of new and old works by British artist Bridget Riley exploring illusion and vision
14 June 2025 - 26 October 2025	The Sunken Boat: A Glimpse Into Past Histories	An installation by Canadian-Egyptian artist Anna Boghiguian exploring themes of maritime trade, labour and economics
22 February 2025 – 1 June 2025	Resistance	An exhibition of photography about protest curated by Artist and Film Maker Steve McQueen
28 September 2024 – 26 January 2025	Anya Gallaccio: preserve	Turner Contemporary presents 'preserve', the largest survey exhibition to date of British artist Anya Gallaccio.
25 May 2024 – 1 September 2024	Ed Clark	The first institutional exhibition in Europe dedicated to pioneering artist Ed Clark (1926–2019)
3 February 2024 – 6 May 2024	Beyond Form: Lines of Abstraction, 1950-1970	This exhibition features art from 50 female artists working within abstract art. Artists included in the exhibition are Bridget Riley, Louise Bourgeois and Agnes Martin.
7 October 2023 - 14 January 2024	In the Offing	A group exhibition edited by Mark Leckey around themes of the seaside, nostaligia and esoteric views of the future. Featured a number of video and sound installations as well as traditional painting.
27 May 2023 - 10 September 2023	Beatriz Milhazes: Maresias	A solo exhibition by Beatriz Milhazes, a leading figure from the Brazilian abstract art movement Geração Oitenta (1980s Generation)

== Image Gallery ==
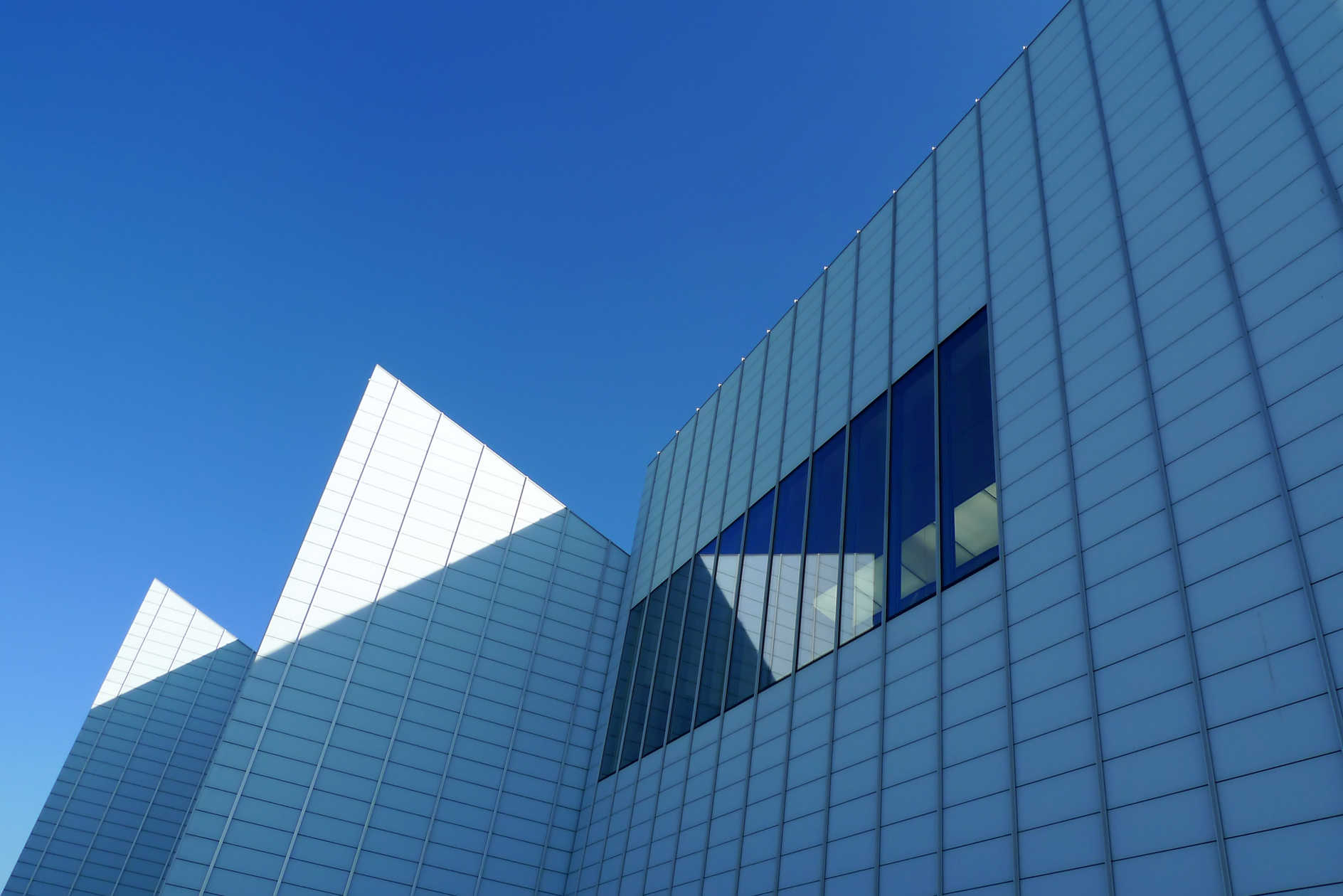
Close up of the roof

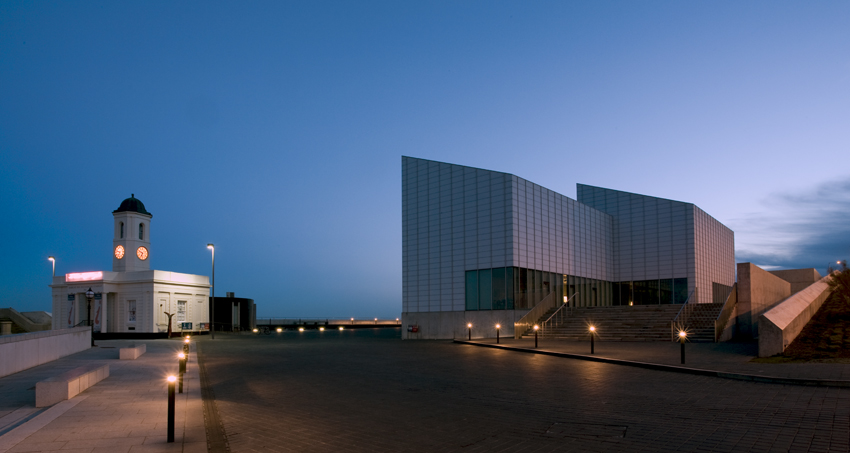
Turner Contemporary

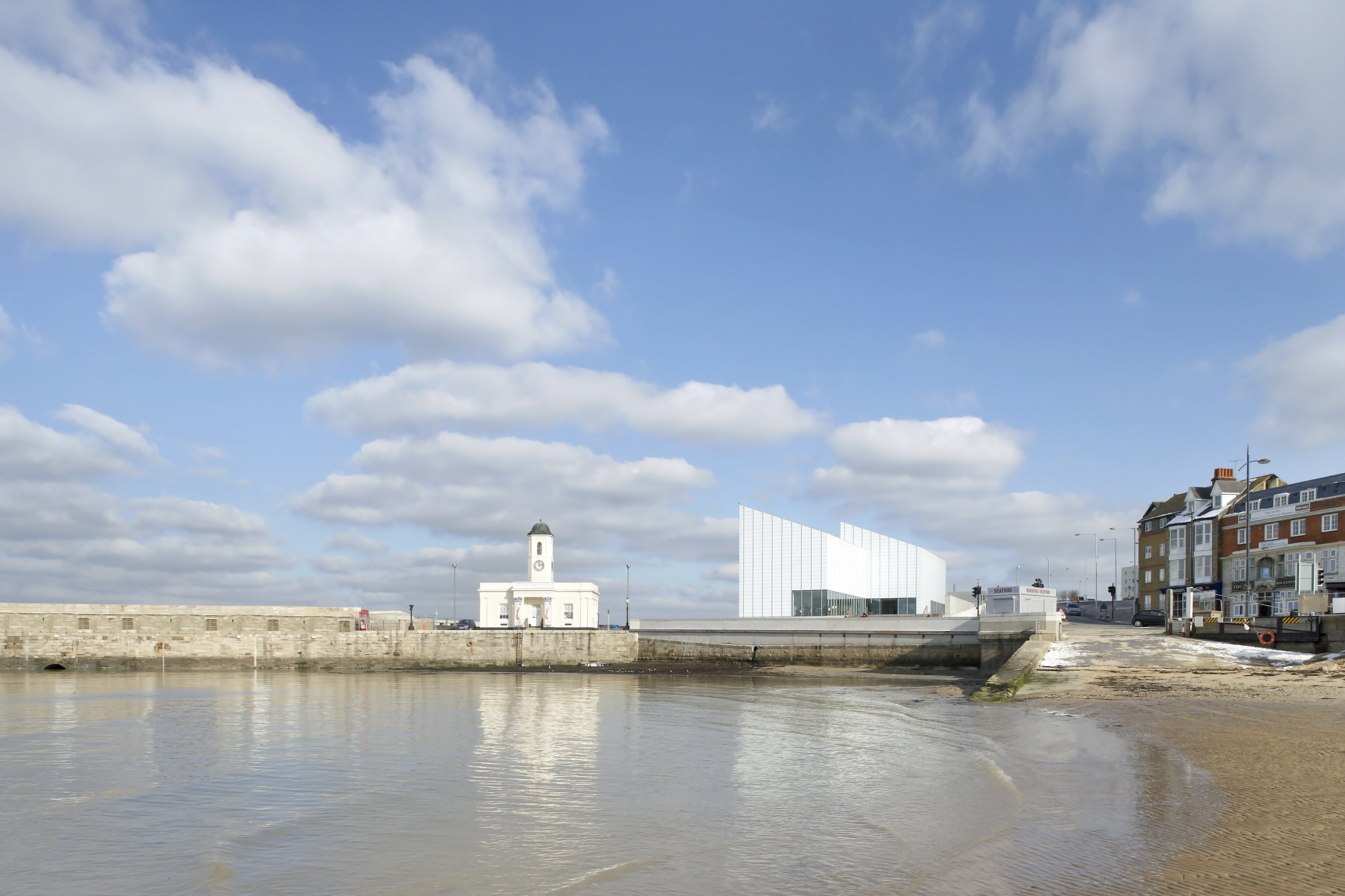
Turner Contemporary

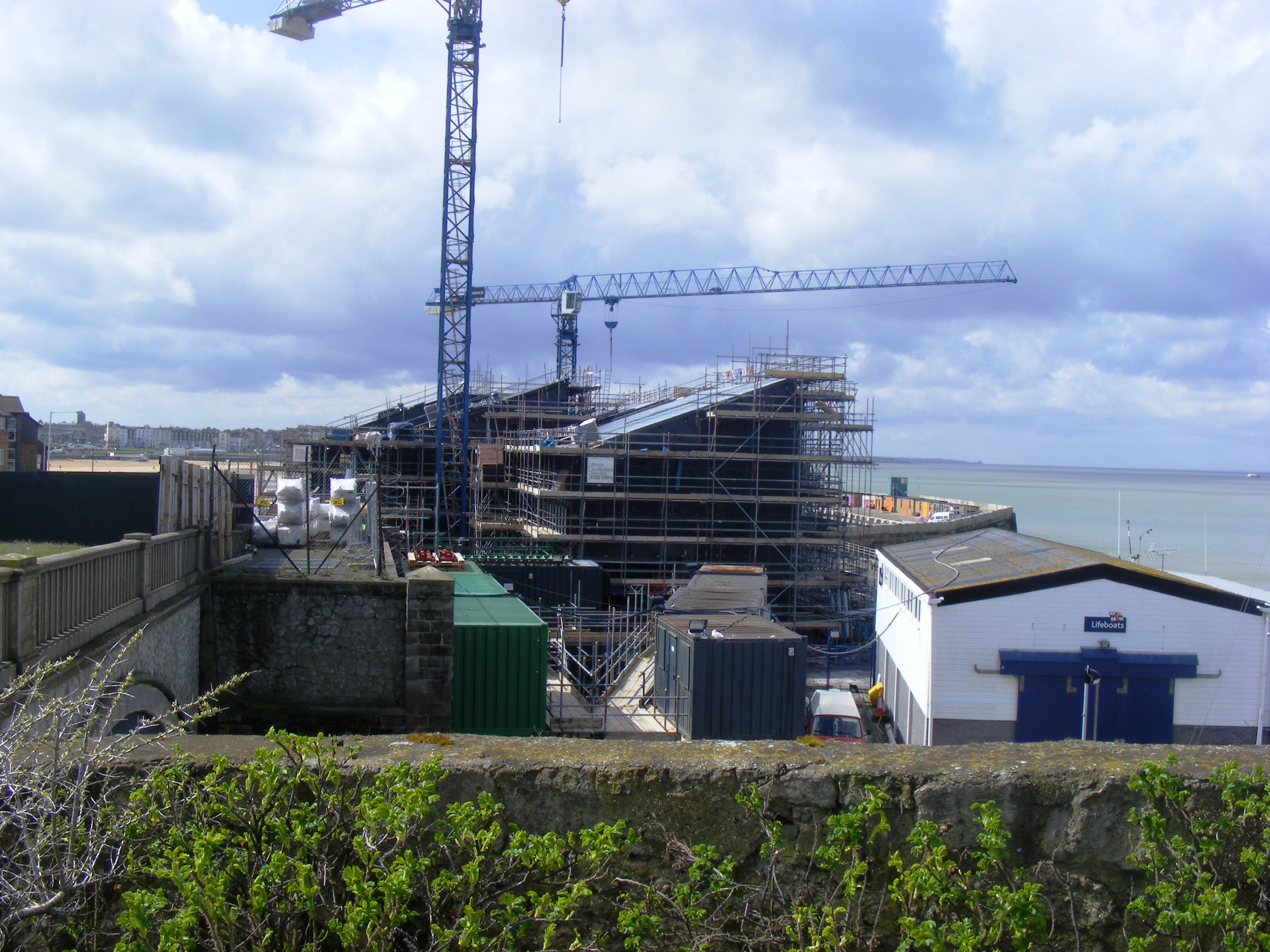
Construction April 2010 from the north

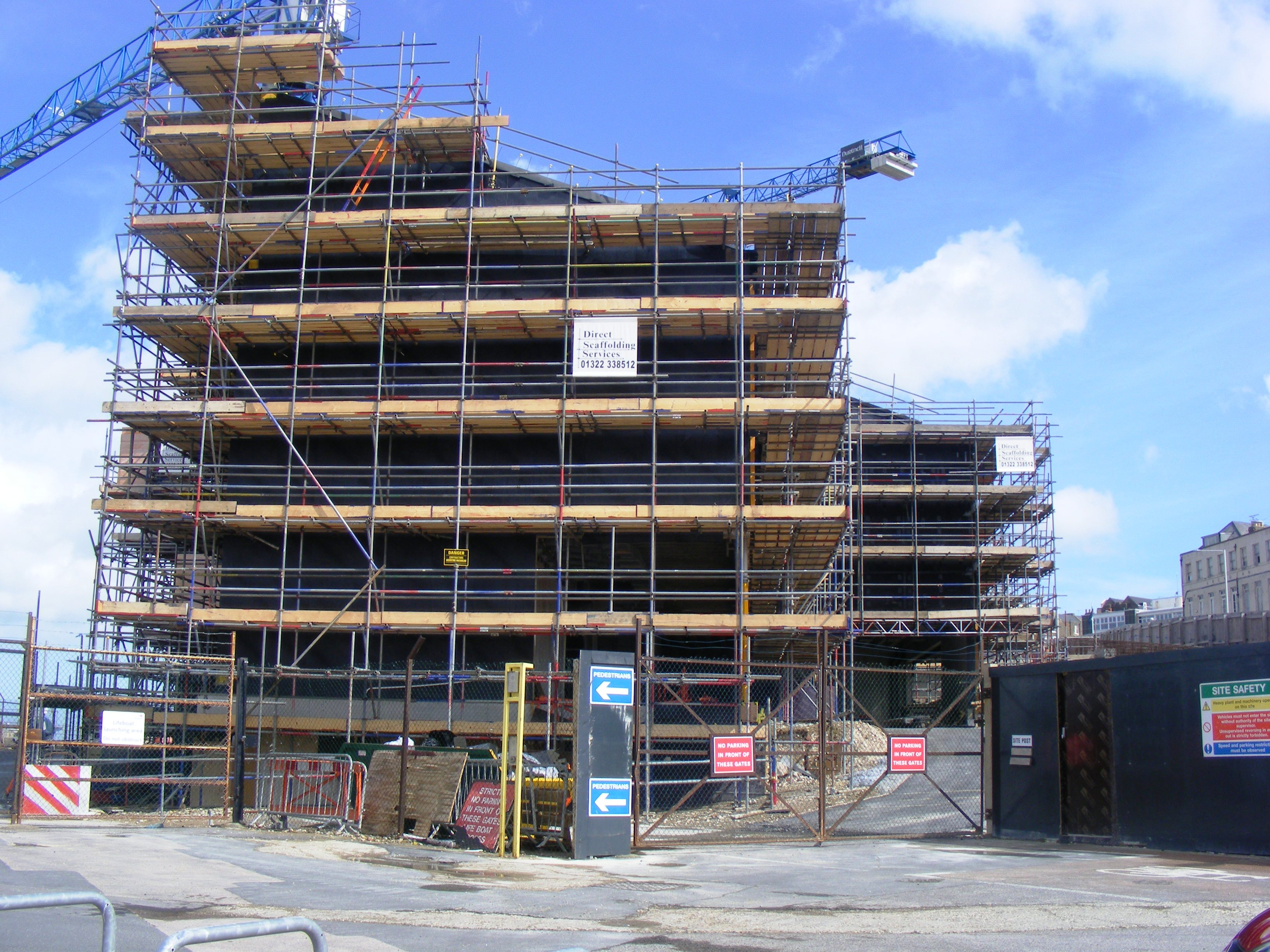
Construction April 2010 from the harbour

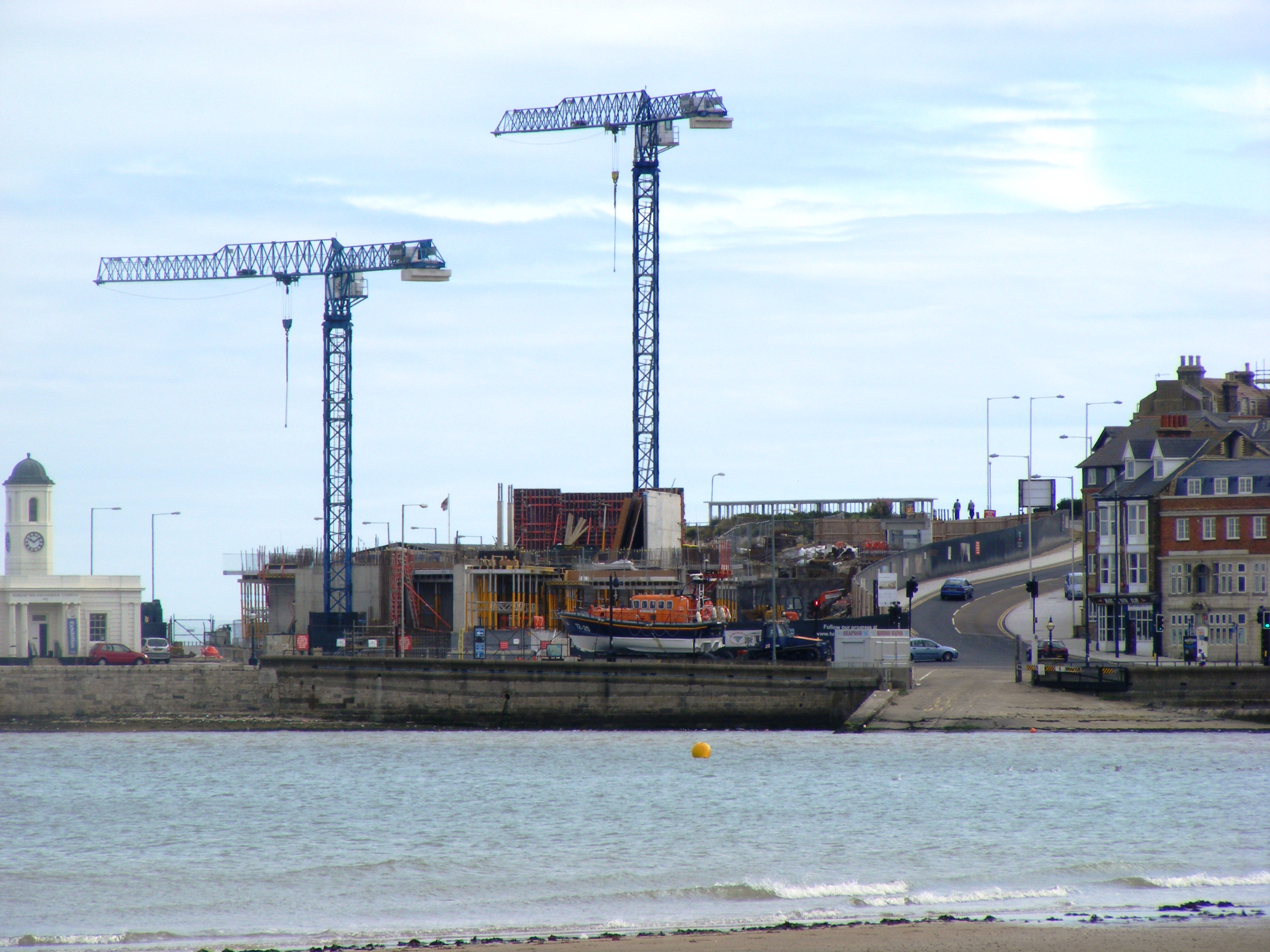
Under construction in 2009
