= Georgette Kokoczynski =

- Born: Georgette Brivadis; 16 August 1907; Versailles, Yvelines, France
- Died: 17 October 1936 (aged 29); Perdiguera, Zaragoza, Spain
- Other name: Mimosa
- Occupation: Nurse
- Years active: 1925–1936
- Movement: Anarchism

Georgette Léontine Roberte Kokoczynski, also known as Georgette Brivady and Mimosa, (1907–1936) was a French anarchist nurse who died on the Aragon Front in the Spanish Civil War.

== Biography ==
Georgette was born in Versailles on 16 August 1907 into a middle-class family. Her father was Robert Ango and her mother Léontine Brivadis. When she was sixteen, she was taken in by the poet André Colomer and his companion Madeleine, who lived in Paris. They introduced her to anarchist ideas.

At the age of eighteen, she joined the anarchist Fernand Fortin and became a member of the group Éducation Sociale, which Fortin had founded in Loches, and began to take part in rallies and festivals. In 1928, she returned to Paris, using the stage name "Mimosa". There, she became part of a theatre group that animated libertarian meetings and festivals. She also sold issues of La Revue anarchiste, which was directed by her partner Fortin. At that time, she finished her nursing studies.

On 7 November 1931 she married the French socialist journalist Miecsejslaw Kokoczynski, from whom she took her surname. He belonged to the XIV Parisian Sector of the French Section of the Workers' International (SFIO).

After taking part in a rally in Paris, in September 1936, she went to Spain and joined the International Group of the Durruti Column. She was assigned to the Aragon Front, together with the German anarchists Augusta Marx and Madeleine Gierth, to look after the canteen and the infirmary. Georgette Kokoczynski died on 17 October 1936 in the battle of Perdiguera near Zaragoza, together with other nurses and dozens of foreign volunteers.

== Diary ==
Kokoczynski kept a diary from her departure from Paris, in September 1936, until her arrival on the Aragon Front, in October 1936. It consists of 45 pages, incomplete, which Fortin copied after her death. It was discovered by Édouard Sill in the collections of the International Institute of Social History (IISG) in Amsterdam under the title Journal de ma Campagne in 2006.

== Recognition ==
- In May 1937, a French-speaking Iberian Anarchist Federation (FAI) group formed in the Gràcia neighbourhood of Barcelona, of which Fortin was a member, took the name "Mimosa" in Kokoczynski's honour.
- On 19 July 1937, the syndicalist and journalist Lola Iturbe, under her pseudonym Kyralina, paid tribute to her in the magazine of the Mujeres Libres.
- In the 1960s, former miliciana and Dutch resistance member Carolina Bunjes founded the Hotel Mimosa, in the Genoese town of Sestri Levante, possibly having named it after Kokoczynski's nom de guerre.
