= Gusmão =

Gusmão (IPA: [ɡuʒˈmɐ̃w]; sometimes Gusmao) is a Portuguese surname of ancient Spanish toponymic origin from the village of Guzmán in the Spanish region of Burgos.

It may refer to:

- Alexandre de Gusmão, Portuguese-Brazilian diplomat
- Artur Guilherme Moraes Gusmão, Brazilian footballer
- Bartolomeu de Gusmão, Portuguese-Brazilian jesuit priest and scientist
- Guilherme Milhomem Gusmão, Brazilian footballer
- Kirsty Sword Gusmão, Australian wife of Xanana
- Luísa de Gusmão, Queen of Portugal by marriage
- Paulo César Gusmão, Brazilian footballer
- Rebeca Gusmão, Brazilian swimmer
- Xanana Gusmão, East Timorese politician

== See also ==
- Guzmán, the Spanish variant.
