= Juan Guzmán =

Juan Guzmán may refer to:

== Arts and entertainment ==
- Juan Guzmán Cruchaga (1895–1979), Chilean poet and playwright
- Juan Guzmán (photographer) (born Hans Gutmann, 1911–1982), German-born Mexican photographer

== Government, law and politics ==
- Juan de Guzmán (died 1569), post-Conquest tlatoani (ruler) of the state of Coyoacan in the Valley of Mexico
- Juan Guzmán Tapia (1939–2021), Chilean judge
- Juan Guzmán (archbishop) (1572–1634), Spanish Roman Catholic archbishop
- Juan Guzmán (patriarch) (died 1605), Spanish Roman Catholic patriarch
- Juan Alonso de Guzmán, 1st Duke of Medina Sidonia (c. 1405–1468), Spanish nobleman and soldier
- Juan Antonio Guzmán (fl. 1980s), Chilean public official
- Juan José Guzmán (1797–1847), first president of El Salvador, 1842–1844

== Sportspeople ==
- Juan Guzmán (baseball) (born 1966), Dominican former pitcher in Major League Baseball, primarily with the Toronto Blue Jays
- Juan Pablo Guzmán (born 1981), Argentinian professional tennis player
- Juan Guzman (soccer) (born 1988), American soccer player
- Juan Guzman (boxer) (1951–2021), Dominican Republic boxer
- Juan Reynoso Guzmán (born 1969), Peruvian retired football defender

== See also ==
- Joan Guzmán (born 1976), flyweight boxer
