= Marina Ginestà =

French-born Spanish journalist

- Ginestà on the rooftop of Hotel Colón, Plaça de Catalunya 9, Barcelona, 1936. Photographed by Juan Guzmán.
- Born: Marina Ginestà i Coloma; 29 January 1919; Toulouse, France
- Died: 6 January 2014 (aged 94); Paris, France
- Occupation: Reporter
- Known for: Iconic figure of the Spanish Civil War

Marina Ginestà i Coloma (29 January 1919 – 6 January 2014) was a Catalan communist born in France, member of the Unified Socialist Youth, and an iconic figure of the Spanish Civil War. She became famous due to the photo taken by Juan Guzmán on the rooftop of the Hotel Colón, Plaça de Catalunya 9, Barcelona during the July 1936 military uprising in Barcelona. It is considered one of the most iconic photographs of the Spanish Civil War.

== Life ==
Ginestà was born in Toulouse on 29 January 1919, into a working-class leftist family that had emigrated to France from Spain. Her parents were both tailors: Empar Coloma Chalmeta, from Valencia, and Bruno Ginestà Manubens, from Manresa. She moved to Barcelona with her parents at the age of 11. Ginestà later joined the Unified Socialist Party of Catalonia. As the war broke out in 1936, she served as a reporter and a translator assisting Mikhail Koltsov, a correspondent of the Soviet newspaper Pravda. Before the end of the war, Ginestà was wounded and evacuated to Montpellier. As France was occupied by the Nazis, she fled to the Dominican Republic where she married a former Republican officer. In 1946, she was forced to leave the country because of the persecution by the dictator Rafael Trujillo and relocate to Venezuela. In 1949, she divorced her husband and moved to France. In 1952, Ginestà married a Belgian diplomat and returned to Barcelona. She moved to Paris in 1978. Marina Ginestà died there at the age of 94 in January 2014.

== The photograph ==
The famous photograph was taken on 21 July 1936. It shows the 17-year-old Ginestà wearing an army uniform and posing with a rifle on the top of the original Hotel Colón, Plaça de Catalunya 9. The picture was taken during the 1936 military uprising in Barcelona. The rifle that Marina is holding is a M1893 Spanish Mauser, manufactured at the Oviedo factory in Spain for the Spanish Army. Because she was a reporter, it was the only time Ginestà had carried a gun. The picture was soon published in a socialist newspaper. The picture later exploded in popularity due to the representation of the Spanish Civil War and is a now universal image of anti-fascism and conflict.

Marina stated about the picture: "It’s a good photo. It reflects the feeling we had at that moment. Socialism had arrived, the hotel guests had left. There was euphoria. We retired in Columbus, we ate well, as if bourgeois life belonged to us and we would have changed category quickly."

The picture was later used on the cover of the book Las Trece Rosas by Carlos Fonseca. The hotel was destroyed after the war and the site is now occupied by the Banco Español de Crédito building.

== See also ==
- Carolina Bunjes
- Kozarčanka, World War II photograph showing a smiling female Partisan in Yugoslavia
