= Luis Guzmán (disambiguation) =

Luis Guzmán (born 1956) is a Puerto Rican actor.

Luis Guzmán may also refer to:

- Luis Guzmán (Spanish footballer) (1893–1942), Spanish football forward
- Luis Guzmán (Peruvian footballer) (1918–1989), Peruvian football midfielder
- Luis Guzmán Canoura (1924–?), Chilean businessman and politician
- Luis Guzmán (water polo) (born 1945), Mexican Olympic water polo player
- Luis Enríquez de Guzmán, 9th Count of Alba de Liste (born c. 1605), viceroy of New Spain and Peru
- Luis Muñoz de Guzmán (1735–1808), Spanish colonial administrator
- Luis Roberto Guzmán (born 1973), Puerto Rican actor

== See also ==
- Luisa de Guzmán (1613–1666), Spanish noblewoman
