= Antonio Jose Guzman =

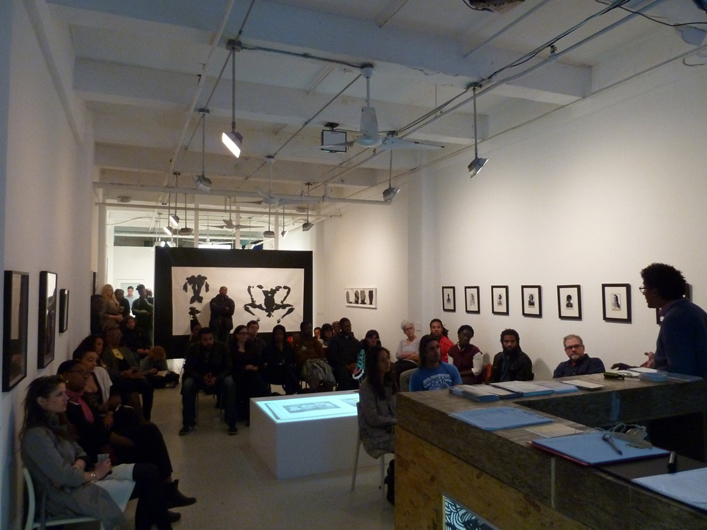
- Guzman lecturing at Rush Arts New York (Rush Philanthropic Arts Foundation)
- Born: 2 August 1971 (age 55); Panama City, Panama
- Education: Gerrit Rietveld Academie, The Netherlands
- Known for: Video art Photography; Installation art Documentaries; New Media Art; Communication Design
- Notable work: The State of L3 (2009),The Day We Surrender to the Air (2009),Piertopolis (2011)
- Website: www.aguzman.com

Antonio Jose Guzman is a Dutch Panamanian visual artist, communication designer and lecturer. He lives and works in Amsterdam, Panama City and Dakar.

== Early life and career ==
Guzman was born in Panama City, Panama in 1971. Guzman began studying photography and video, and became interested in Polaroids at early age. In the early 1990s he worked in Panama for the advertising giant Foote, Cone & Belding (FCB) Draftfcb as a staff photographer. In the same years he did a series of photo projects for Greenpeace Latin America and was freelance photographer for France Press International. In 1994 he graduated from the Isthmus University. He wrote a thesis on the psychological effects of advertising photography.

In 1997 he moved to Europe and started working as an editorial photographer and art director of different magazines in Barcelona, London and Amsterdam. In 2003 he produced and directed his first documentary, "Representando".

Inspired by various exhibitions of Bill Viola in the Stedelijk Museum Amsterdam and by the Gasometer Oberhausen, Germany. Guzman started studies in 2004 on audiovisual arts at the Gerrit Rietveld Academie of Amsterdam. At the Rietveld he began to work with gravitational issues, migration and the life of one of his heroes, the late Dutch California based artist Bas Jan Ader. Guzman's examination project "Gravitational Experiences", was a series of multiple channel installations and the documentary "The Miracle".

Besides his individual art practice, Guzman is a lecturer and the founder of The State of L3 Contemporary Arts and Film Collective, the Communication Design studio Noisy Networks, and the visual arts atelier GF Workstation Amsterdam.

== Work ==
Guzman works on research projects inspired by DNA, scientific genetic research, migration, gravity and architectonic utopias. Guzman's oeuvre features installations, photography, sculptures, interventions, documentaries, films, sounds, single- and multichannel videos and publications. His projects allow us to cross different time zones, unexplored worlds and realms; bringing us into what Guzman calls time travel perceptions.

=== Chain Diary ===
Between 2007 and 2010 he took part in the nomadic exhibition Multiple M, in which he participated with his international interactive multimedia project Chain Diary.

=== The State of L3 ===
After the success of Chain Diary he developed the project State of L3 where he asks artists in Brazil, the Netherlands and Senegal to upload their work onto a database for people to react and respond. The database was to create an expanding online community from Africa or those interested in Africa and its impact.

The project brings together their thoughts, ideas, experiences, dialogues and virtual exchange in the L3 virtual database. The State of L3 explores with multimedia installations as a medium for a documentary on transatlantic networks and the artists reflections on the Black Atlantic African world, the symbiosis that exist between people of African descent and their position in the contemporary society as well as the historic perspective and the colonial past of the countries of origin of the artists. The project was supported by the Mondriaan Foundation, the VSB Foundation, the Prince Claus Fund, the Netherlands Foundation for Visual Arts, Design and Architecture (Fonds BKVB) and Erfgoed Nederland.

=== The Day We Surrender to the Air ===
The State of L3 was developed at the same time that Guzman started the documentary trilogy The Day We Surrender to the Air, a documentary based on the results of Guzman's DNA test. This DNA test, executed by the National Geographic Genographic Project and African Ancestry, shows Guzman's mixed background. In the documentary, Guzman travels to the places of his ancestry and brings to the front various questions considering ethnic identity, migration and Diaspora. The trilogy was supported by The Netherlands Foundation for Visual Arts, Design and Architecture (Fonds BKVB). The documentary had its premiere at the International Documentary Festival Amsterdam (IDFA), before going on international tour in 2010. The Day We Surrender to the Air, Episode Two was firstly shown at The Thessaloniki Documentary Festival 2010 in Greece and the Africa in the Picture film festival, Amsterdam.

=== Piertopolis ===
Guzman's research for multiple connections worldwide has defined and shaped his vision and artistic iconography, after an extensive family ancestry and DNA research Guzman jump into a bigger boat, that will define sociologically the whole humanity in his following projects Piertopolis, D.A.T.E.D Paris and Psychogeographic Mapping Project.

Piertopolis is inspired by New Babylon of COBRA artist Constant, Piertopolis features an architectural design for an installation of a life-size landscape made out of piers and walking bridges. The project is supported by the Amsterdam Foundation for the Arts. AFK and by the Mondriaan Fonds.

The Piertopolis exhibition at Gemak in January 2012 converted the entire museum into a Buckminster Fuller / New Babylon (Constant Nieuwenhuys) idealistic Utopian architectonic landscape for a future society. His film the 'Legend of Billy Maclean' premièred in the National Centre for Performing Arts (NCPA), Mumbai, India's premier cultural institution and his project DATED performed at the Divan Du Monde and Petit Ban in Paris (invited by Dimanche Rouge). For DATED Guzman made live assemblages of his documentaries 'The Day We Surrender to The Air' and 'The Legend of Billy Maclean', to the singing and voice of American artist Aurora Adams. DATED is inspired by the novel Rayuela, from the Argentine writer Julio Cortázar.

=== Los Angeles Mapping Project ===
Los Angeles Mapping Project is a Psychogeographic Research of the population demographics and transit of different district and neighborhoods of Los Angeles. The Project explore the Psychogeography idea of the city using new social networks. Inspired by Guy Debord "unitary urbanism", the information from the research was transform into data visualization maps, that generate an idea on how the district and neighborhoods of Los Angeles are forming itself towards the future, the maps demonstrate areas of Transculturalism or homogeneous cultures, incomes and preferences.

Articles on Los Angeles Mapping Project (Psychogeographic Mapping) by Dutch Art Events, Void Gallery Amsterdam, The Windward School, Los Angeles and art critic Rob Perrée

== Exhibitions ==
Guzman's work has been included in group exhibitions in the MHKA The Museum of Contemporary Art, Antwerp; Gemak de Vrije Academie, The Hague; Smart Project Space, Amsterdam; Gallery Image, Arhus, Denmark; Knipsu Art Space, Bergen, Norway; Moretti and Moretti, Paris; and in the Corridor Gallery, New York City. He participated in the Sharjah Biennial, United Arab Emirates 2011, Panama Biennial and in the Dakar Biennale, Senegal, 2010.

Guzman has been given lectures at The New School New York; the Museum voor Moderne Kunst Arnhem; the DAI Artez Master School program, Tent Rotterdam; IDFA The International Documentary Festival Amsterdam; Windward School Los Angeles and Det Jyske Kunstakademi, Aarhus, Denmark.

== Gallery ==
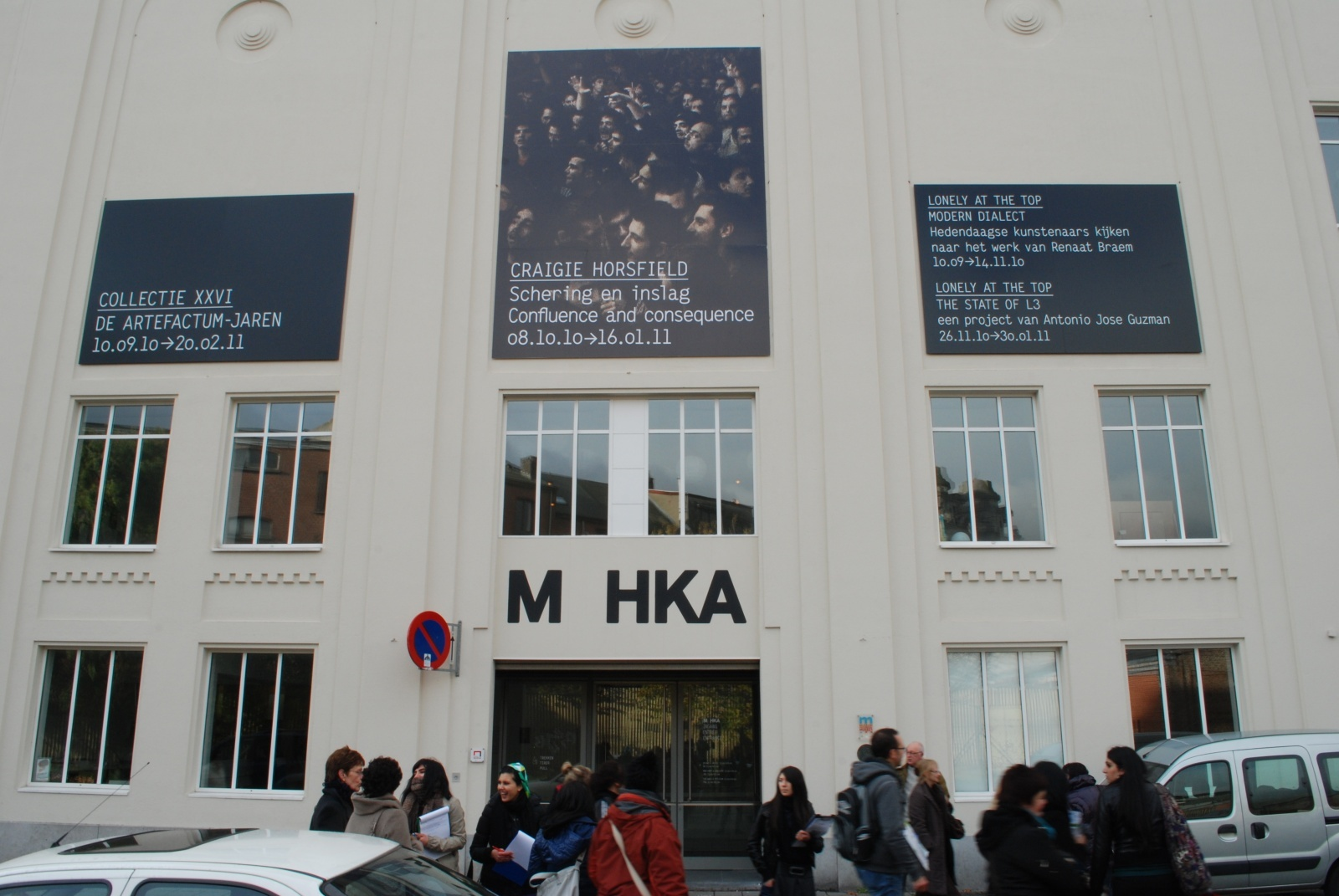
Guzman at The Museum of Contemporary Art Antwerp (M HKA)

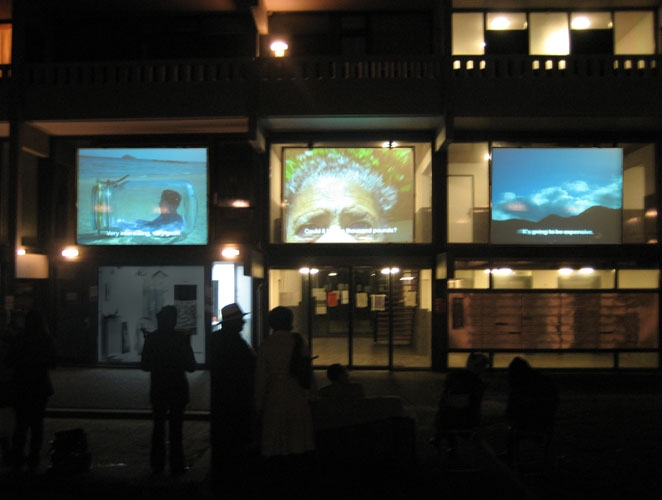
Projection of Guzman's short film The Miracle. Tower of hour, Echtenstein Ateliers

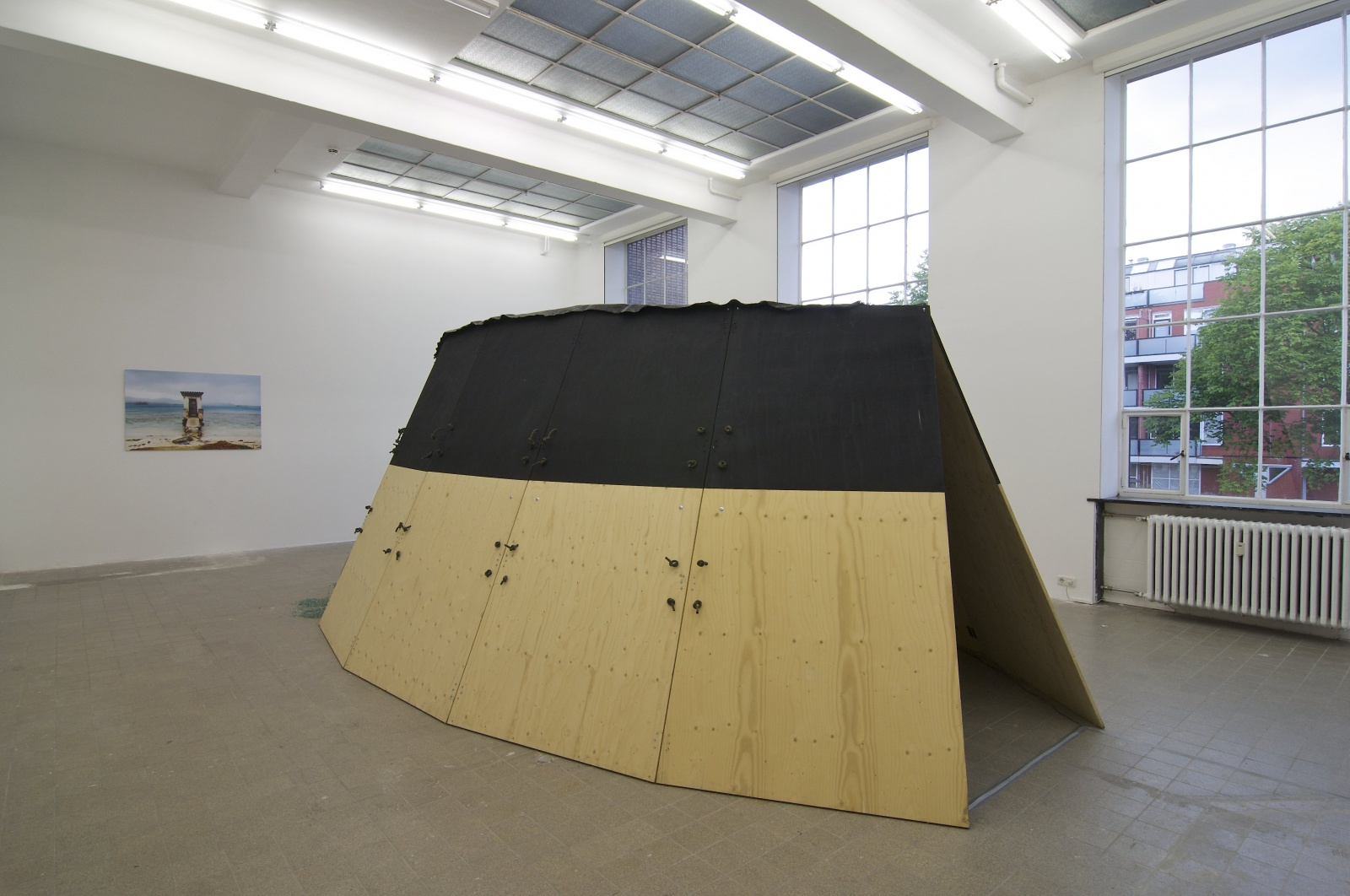
Guzman at Smart Project Space

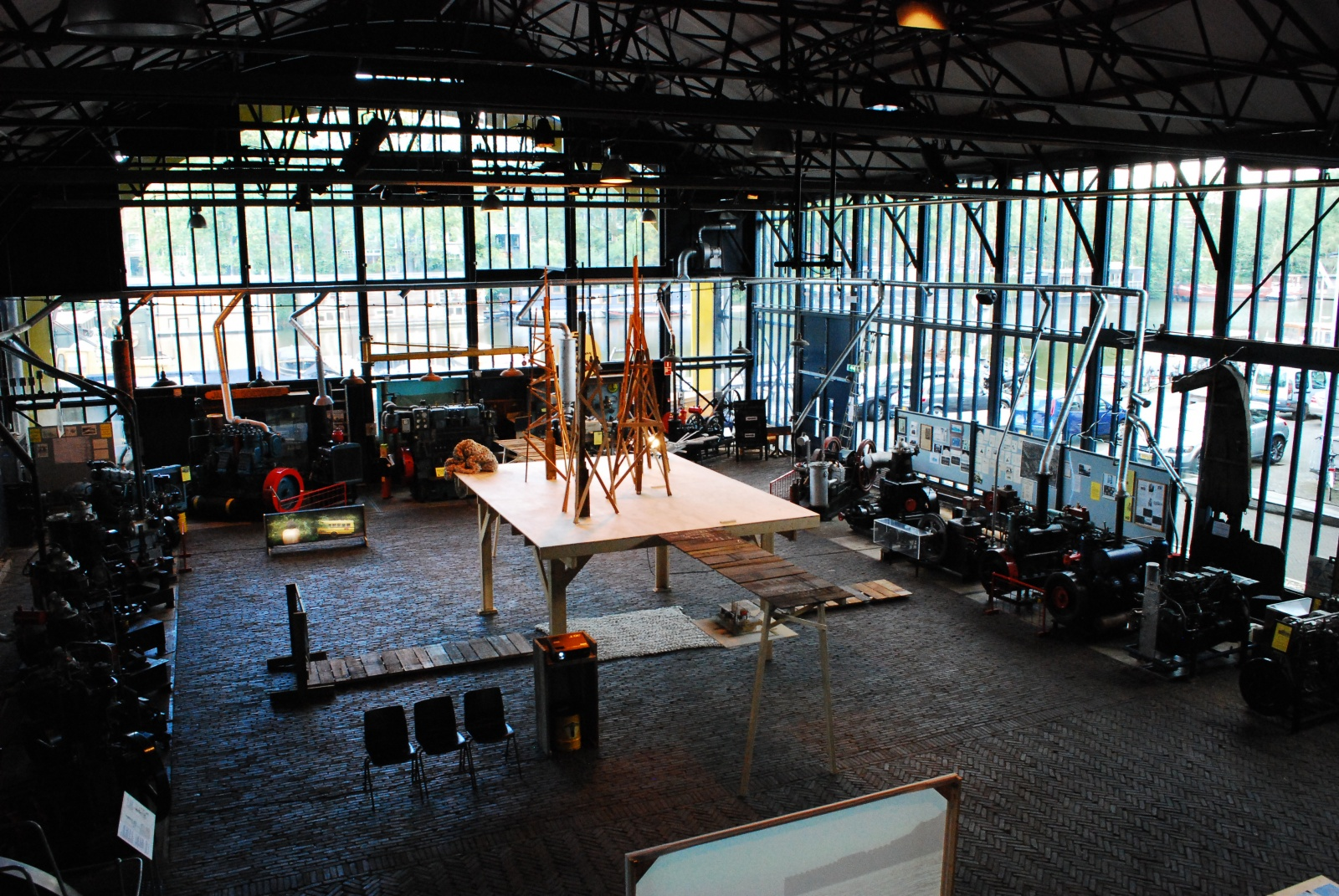
Guzman Project Piertopolis Museum Kromhout Amsterdam

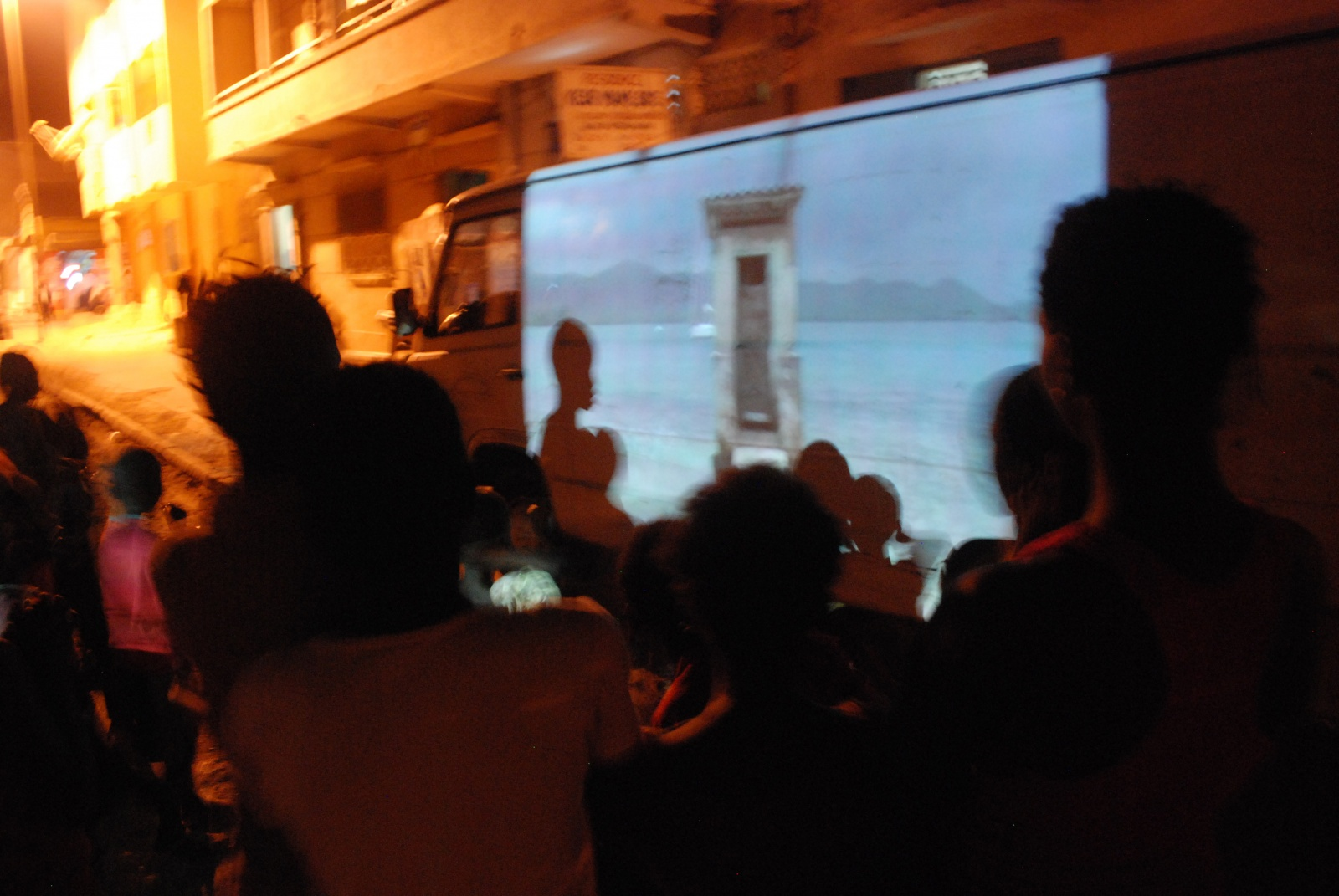
Guzman Dakar Biennial Projections

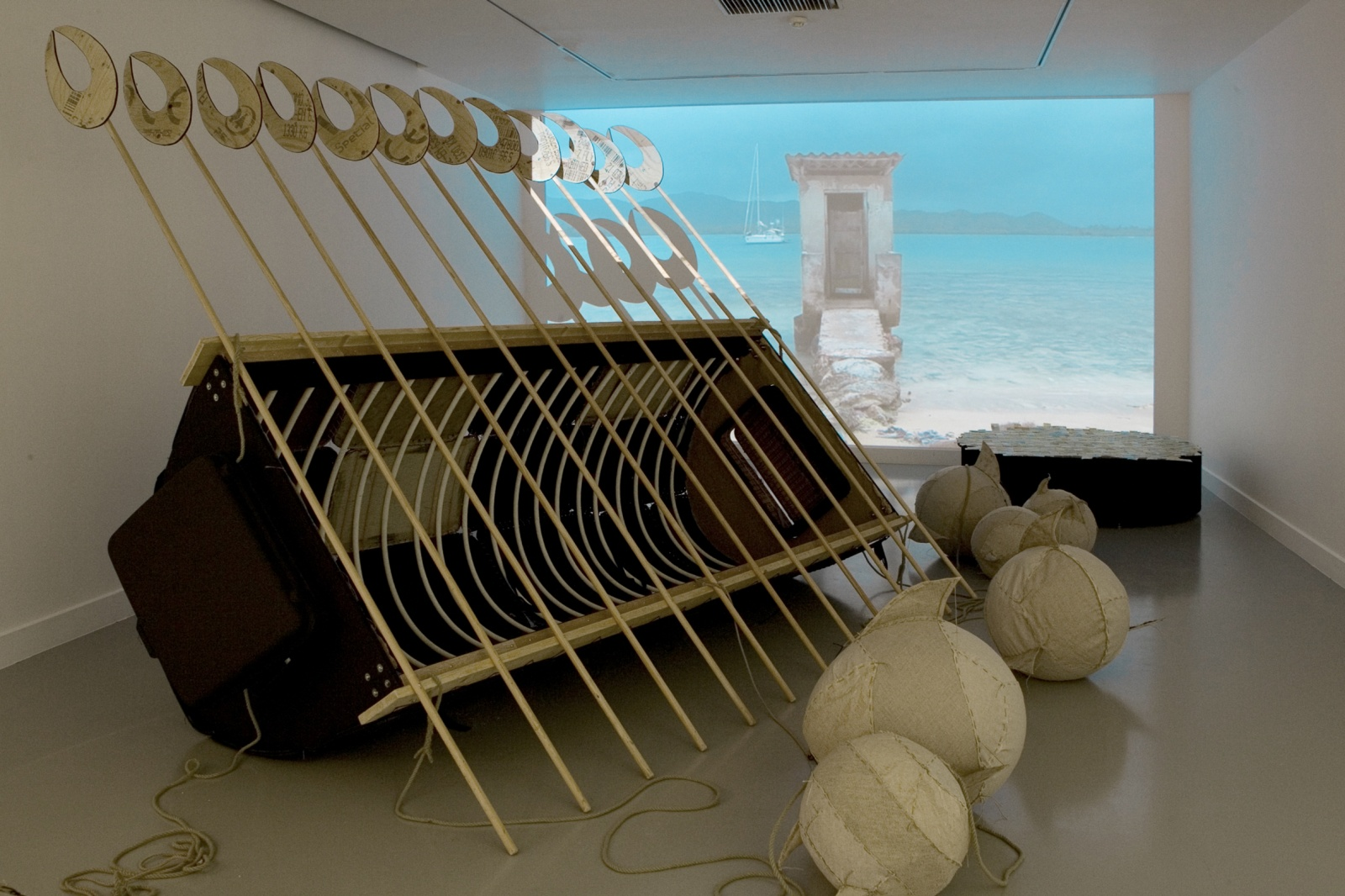
Guzman at MHKA Antwerp

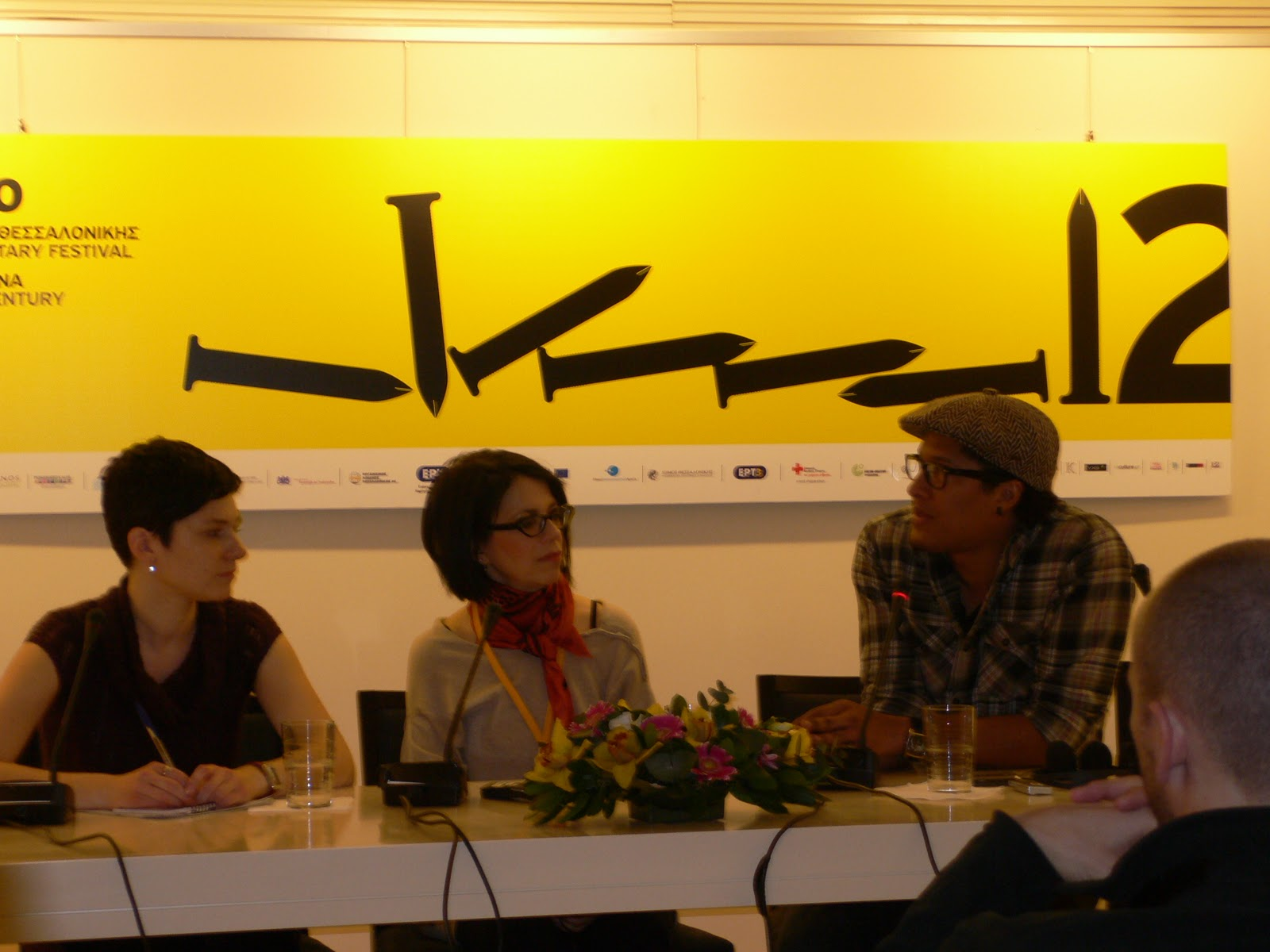
"The Day We Surrender to the Air" Press Conference Thessaloniki Film Festival

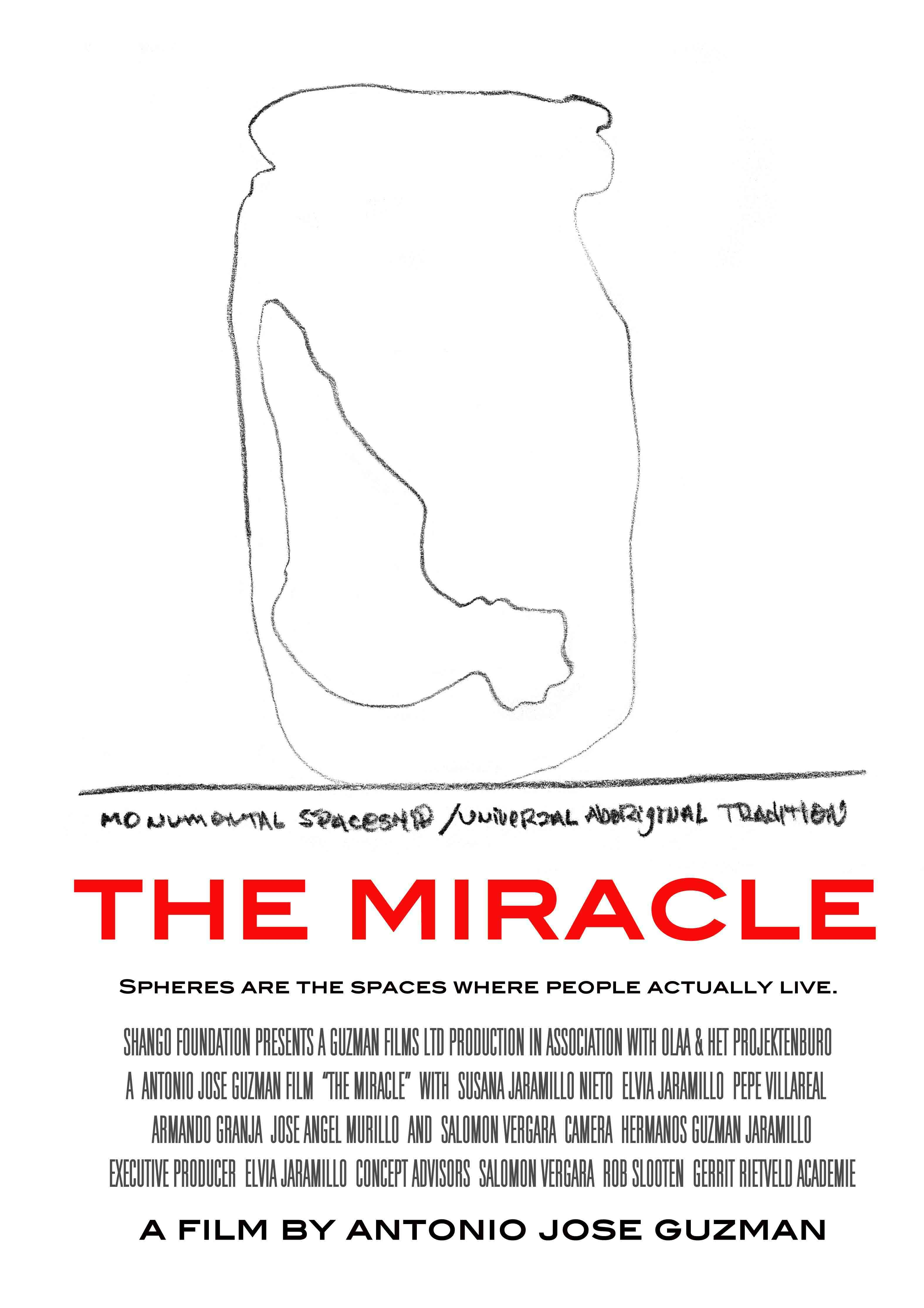
The Miracle Poster
