= New Babylon (Constant Nieuwenhuys) =

Proposed city designed by the Situationist artist

New Babylon is an anti-capitalist city perceived and designed in 1959–74 as a future potentiality by visual artist Constant Nieuwenhuys.

== Origin of the name ==
Initially known as Dériville (from "ville dérivée", literally, "drift city"), it was later renamed New Babylon. Henri Lefebvre explained: "a New Babylon -- a provocative name, since in the Christian tradition Babylon is a figure of evil. New Babylon was to be the figure of good that took the name of the cursed city and transformed itself into the city of the future."

== Goal and rationale ==
The goal was the creating of alternative life experiences, called "situations", Sarah Williams Goldhagen explained:

[In the 1950s, Constant] had already been working for years on his "New Babylon" series of paintings, sketches, texts, and architectural models describing the shape of a post-revolutionary society. Constant's New Babylon was to be a series of linked transformable structures, some of which were themselves the size of a small city--what architects call a megastructure. Perched above ground, Constant's megastructures would literally leave the bourgeois metropolis below and would be populated by homo ludens--man at play. (Homo Ludens is the title of a book by the great Dutch historian Johan Huizinga.) In the New Babylon, the bourgeois shackles of work, family life, and civic responsibility would be discarded. The post-revolutionary individual would wander from one leisure environment to another in search of new sensations. Beholden to no one, he would sleep, eat, recreate, and procreate where and when he wanted. Self-fulfillment and self-satisfaction were Constant's social goals. Deductive reasoning, goal-oriented production, the construction and betterment of a political community--all these were eschewed.

Nieuwenhuys' New Babylon was based on the idea that architecture itself would allow and instigate a transformation of daily reality. As Nieuwenhuys wrote:

It is obvious that a person free to use his time for the whole of his life, free to go where he wants, when he wants, cannot make the greatest use of his freedom in a world ruled by the clock and the imperative of a fixed abode. As a way of life, Homo Ludens will demand, firstly, that he responds to his need for playing, for adventure, for mobility, as well as all the conditions that facilitate the free creation of his own life. Until then, the principal activity of man had been the exploration of his natural surroundings. Homo Ludens himself will seek to transform, to recreate, those surroundings, that world, according to his new needs. The exploration and creation of the environment will then happen to coincide because, in creating his domain to explore, Homo Ludens will apply himself to exploring his own creation. Thus we will be present at an uninterrupted process of creation and re-creation, sustained by a generalized creativity that is manifested in all domains of activity.

== See also ==
- Megastructure
- Situationist International
