= Luis Guzmán (water polo) =

Mexican water polo player (born 1945)

Personal information
- Born: 9 April 1945 (age 79); Mexico City, Mexico

Sport
- Sport: Water polo

Luis Guzmán (born 9 April 1945) is a Mexican water polo player. He competed in the men's tournament at the 1968 Summer Olympics.
