= Martha Guzmán Partida =

Mexican mathematician

Martha Dolores Guzmán Partida is a Mexican mathematician specializing in functional analysis, including Fourier analysis, harmonic analysis, and the theory of distributions. She is a professor of mathematics at the Universidad de Sonora.

== Education ==
Guzmán Partida was an undergraduate at the Meritorious Autonomous University of Puebla. She completed her doctorate in 1995 at the National Autonomous University of Mexico. Her dissertation, Hardy Spaces of Conjugates Temperatures, was supervised by Salvador Pérez Esteva.

== Recognition ==
Guzmán was elected to the Mexican Academy of Sciences in 2013.

== Selected publications ==
- Alvarez, J; Lakey, J.; Guzmán–Partida, Martha. "Spaces of bounded lambda–central mean oscillation, Morrey spaces, and lambda–central Carleson measures." Collectanea Mathematica, 51 (1), 2000, pp. 1–47.
- Alvarez, J; Guzmán–Partida, Martha; Pérez–Esteva, S. "Harmonic extensions of distributions." Mathematische Nachrichten, 280 (13–14), 2007, pp.1443–1466.
- Alvarez, J; Guzmán–Partida, Martha; Skórnik, U. "S'–convolvability with the Poisson kernel in the Euclidean case and the product domain case." Studia Mathematica, 2 (156), 2003, pp.143–163.
