= José Guzmán (disambiguation) =

José Guzmán (born 1963) is a Puerto Rican baseball player.

José Guzmán may also refer to:

- José Guzmán (footballer) (1891–1930), Spanish footballer
- José Guzmán (basketball) (1937–2026), Peruvian Olympic basketball player
- José Guzmán (boxer) (born 1963), Venezuelan boxer
- José Guzmán Santos (born 1947), Mexican politician
- José Florencio Guzmán (1929–2017), Chilean politician
- José de Guzmán Benítez (1857–1921), Mayor of Ponce, Puerto Rico
- José de Guzmán, 1st Viscount of San Rafael de la Angostura (1740–1792), Dominican cattle rancher, colonizer and nobleman

== See also ==
- Juan José Guzmán (1800–1847), President of El Salvador (1842–1844)
- José Rocchi Guzmán (born 1988), Mexican football goalkeeper
