= Constant Nieuwenhuys =

Dutch painter (1920–2005)

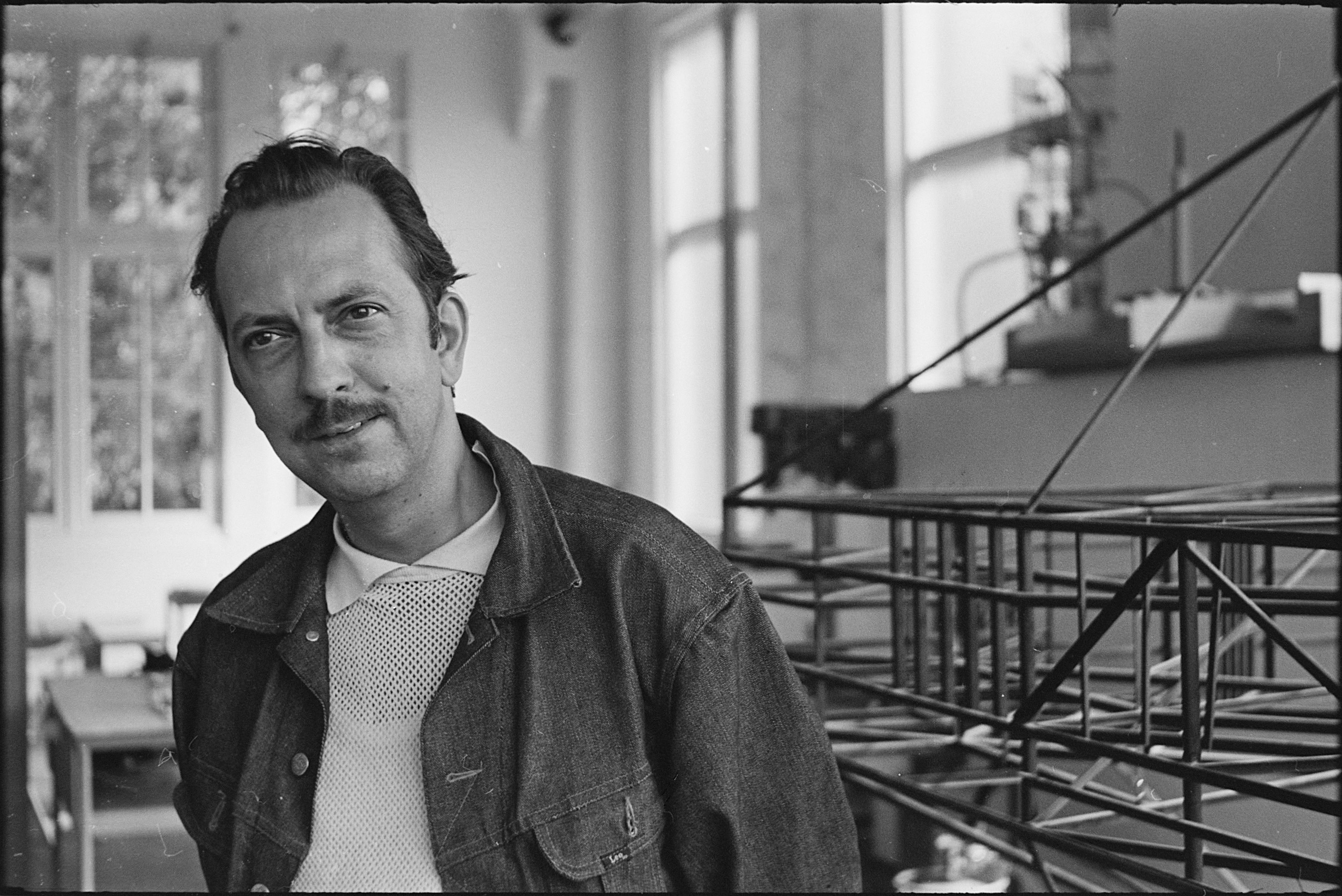
Constant in his studio, 1966

Constant Anton Nieuwenhuys (21 July 1920 – 1 August 2005), better known as Constant, was a Dutch painter, sculptor, graphic artist, author and musician.

== Early period ==
Constant was born in Amsterdam on 21 July 1920 as the first son of Pieter Nieuwenhuijs and Maria Cornelissen. Their second son, Jan Nieuwenhuys, was born a year later. Both sons became artists although their parents had no apparent interest in art.

As a young child Constant drew passionately and showed great talent. He read literature with a special preference for poetry and played musical instruments. During his teenage years he learned to sing and to read music while in the church choir at the Ignatius Gymnasium, a prestigious Jesuit school in Amsterdam. In his later years, greatly inspired by gypsy music, he only played improvised music. He played guitar, violin and at 45 years of age also mastered playing the cimbalon.

Constant painted his first oil painting, De Emmaüsgangers, at age sixteen. It depicted the revelation of Jesus to two of his followers in Emmaus. With no money to buy materials he painted this painting on a jute sugar bag with pigments he had bought from a house painter. Many of Constant's early drawings and paintings are religiously inspired, due to his Jesuit schooling. Yet at the age of twenty Constant turned his back on Catholicism.

After one year studying at the Kunstnijverheidsschool (Arts and Crafts School), Constant attended the Rijksakademie voor Beeldende Kunst (State Academy of Fine Arts) from 1939 to 1941. This education in craftmanship was put to use especially during his "New Babylon" period, when Constant built many constructions and models.

Constant lived and worked in Bergen from 1941 to 1943. Through the Bergense School he was introduced to the work of Paul Cézanne, which impacted him deeply, as evident in Zelfportret (Self Portrait), 1942. On 13 July 1942 he married Matie van Domselaer, the daughter of the composer Jakob van Domselaer.

The city of Bergen was evacuated by the Germans in 1943 and so Constant and Matie moved back to Amsterdam. During this period Constant went into hiding and refrained from registering at the Kulturkammer (Nazi Chamber of Culture) to avoid the Arbeitseinsatz (labour supply for the Germans). Because of this he was unable to conventionally exercise his craft or to buy art supplies. To paint Constant used tablecloths and bed linen and had to rinse them out to start again.

During the war Constant's brother in law, Jaap van Domselaer, moved into the apartment to hide from the 'Arbeitseinsatz.' He introduced Constant to Plato, Spinoza, Descartes, Kant, Hegel and Marx. Especially the latter provided great inspiration to Constant regarding his later ideas on art and society.

During the winter famine of 1944 Constant's first son, Victor Nieuwenhuys, was born. After the war, Constant, his wife and son moved back to Bergen only to return to Amsterdam in 1946 where they lived in an apartment across from the zoo Artis. When the war ended Constant was able to expand and grow as an artist after years of captivity and limitations. He liberated himself artistically and experimented with multiple techniques of art-making. He was inspired by Cubism, especially by Georges Braque. In 1946 his daughter Martha was born, followed by his daughter Olga in 1948.

== CoBrA ==
In 1946 Constant travelled to Paris for the first time where he met the young Danish painter Asger Jorn. The friendship between Jorn and Constant later formed the basis for the avant-garde movement CoBrA.

July 1948 Constant founded Reflex Experimentele Groep in Holland with Corneille, Karel Appel and his brother Jan Nieuwenhuys. The first edition of the magazine Reflex was published with a manifesto written by Constant. For Constant art had to be experimental. He had deducted this from the French word 'expérience' and believed that art springs from experience of the artist and is continuously changing. In the manifesto he stated that the process of creation is more important to the experimental artist than the work itself; it is a means to reach spiritual and mental enrichment. Also, the work of experimental artists is a mirror image of changes in the general perception of beauty.

Constant, Corneille and Appel, three totally different characters and artists, were united in their quest for innovation. They exhibited their work together and were often seen together in the European art scene. The wanderlust of the three is especially notorious.

Later in the year 1948 on the terrace of café Notre Dame in Paris the Experimentele Groep in Holland linked up with Christian Dotremont and Joseph Noiret from Belgium and Asger Jorn from Denmark to form CoBrA, a name which was made by Dotremont, formed by the first letters of their hometowns: Copenhagen, Brussels and Amsterdam. The members opposed aesthetics in painting and bourgeois art in general.

Constant had already outlined their ideas in his manifesto in Reflex magazine. This manifesto contains another of his famous quotes: "A painting is not a structure of colours and lines, but an animal, a night, a cry, a man, or all of these together".

Constant was productive during the CoBrA period. White Bird (1948), Ladder (1949) and Scorched Earth I (1951) are some of his noted works from this period. At this time CoBrA published bulletin additional artists from several different disciplines joined their ranks. In 1948 Constant, together with poet Gerrit Kouwenaar, published a poetry album Goede Morgen Haan. Additionally there were two large CoBrA exhibitions, one in Amsterdam in 1949 and one in Liège in 1951.

The director of the Stedelijk Museum Amsterdam (Municipal Museum of Amsterdam), Willem Sandberg, was very supportive of young artists and fully supported the CoBrA group by giving them seven large rooms to exhibit their work in. Most of the CoBrA works had been fairly small due to their lack of money and so Sandberg gave the artists an advance to create some larger works in the week before the exhibition. Constant, Corneille, Appel and Eugène Brands created several large pieces of art that have become iconic for the movement. The architect Aldo van Eyck was commissioned to shape the exhibition. The works of art as well as the way they were presented give rise to harsh critique from press and public. A critic from Het Vrije Volk wrote: "Geklad, geklets en geklodder in het Stedelijk Museum" ("Smirch, twaddle and mess in the Municipal Museum"). The CoBrA artists were considered scribblers and con artists.

In the Liège exhibition in 1951, even larger than the Stedelijk exhibition, the CoBrA group dissolved itself and with its tenth edition bulletin publication. As Christian Dotremont, the international secretary, stated in Museum News in 1962 the group would rather "mourir en beauté" (die in beauty) than become a regular artist interest group.

== Situationist International ==
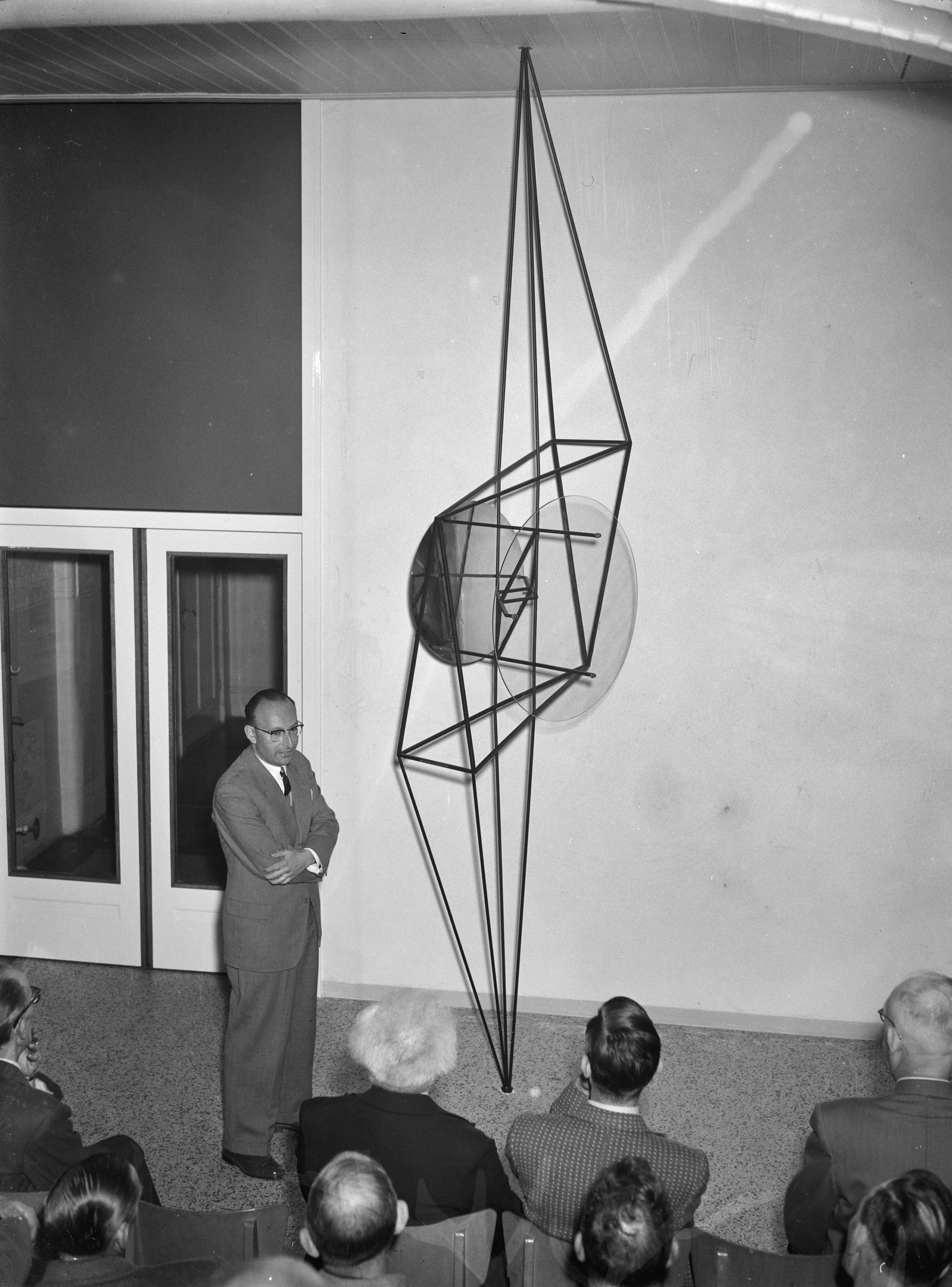
Alderman Van der Berg received wire sculpture of Constant Nieuwenhuis, 1956

After CoBrA Constant's work became more abstract. Back in Amsterdam in the summer of 1952 he developed an interest in spatial architecture and three-dimensional works. With Aldo van Eyck, whom he met during his CoBrA time, he created a space for the exhibition 'Man and House' at the Urban Museum Amsterdam from 1952-1953. In 1954 he worked on a project with Gerrit Rietveld. Together they created a model house for the de Bijenkorf chain of department stores.

In 1952 Constant received a scholarship from the Arts Council of Great Britain to study in London for three months. There he met, amongst others, Henry Moore, Anthony Hill, Kenneth Martin, Ben Nicholson, Barbara Hepworth, Roger Hilton and Victor Pasmore. He found the art climate in London very welcoming. As opposed to Paris, Constant felt that art was judged more objectively.

At that time Constant lived near Kensington Gardens and as he walked through the bombed city every day he started to wonder how people live and how cities should be built. His stay in London raised his awareness of how the constructions that surround us influence us. He felt that the constructions of his time were mostly practical, immensely dull and provided no room to develop playful and creative lifestyles.

In the summer of 1956 Asger Jorn invited Constant to Alba, Piedmont, Italy, for a congress dedicated to 'Industry and the Fine Arts' initiated by 'Mouvement pour un Bauhaus Imaginiste' (International Movement for an Imaginist Bauhaus). At this congress Constant presented his lecture Demain la poésie logera la vie in which he pleaded for a free architecture which could stimulate a creative lifestyle rather than impede it. In 1952 Debord had founded the Lettrist International for which he was a writer, filmmaker and strategic activist. The 'Lettrist International' were also at the Alba congress and they pleaded for a unitary urbanism (the synthesis of art and technology). Later that year Constant visited Debord in Alba, which proved to be an inspiration for both.

Debord wanted to establish an even more radical movement which would totally abandon the arena of fine art while solely focusing on questions of psychogeography, a total dissolution of boundaries between art and life. In 1957 he and Asger Jorn brought together the International Movement for an Imaginist Bauhaus and the Lettrist International by establishing Situationist International. They specifically denied their status as an art movement.

Constant did not join SI at that time. He objected to the SI on the ground that the movement seemed to be established mainly by artists who have their own interest at heart more than a common goal. When SI openly pleaded for 'unitary urbanism', as defined by Constant and Debord, Constant joined. An intensive correspondence between him and Debord followed. Constant wrote several theoretical articles for the French SI journal and staged events at several museums in Paris as well as the Stedelijk Museum in Amsterdam, where he showed his New Babylon series in 1959.

The success of the New Babylon show in 1959 prompted SI to plan a group exhibition there in April–May 1960. This exhibition would never take place. Disagreements in the group resulted in a split and several expulsions. In 1960 Constant left the group for the same reason he initially objected to joining. By 1961 no one remained of the original artistic core or tendency except Debord himself. though members more allied to the SI's political tendency remained.

== New Babylon ==
Back in Amsterdam after his stay in London, Nieuwenhuys started to focus mainly on architecture and the urban environment. The focal point of his work was finding out what potential added value art can provide in intensifying daily life, in which there is room for creative expression. He abandoned painting to work solely on his New Babylon project from 1956 to 1974.

With New Babylon Nieuwenhuys envisioned a "world wide city for the future" where land is owned collectively, work is fully automated and the need to work replaced with a nomadic life of creative play. New Babylon is inhabited by homo ludens, who, freed from labor, will not have to make art, for he can be creative in the daily practice of his life.

In Nieuwenhuys' own words:

The project of New Babylon only intends to give the minimum conditions for a behaviour that must remain as free as possible. Any restriction of the freedom of movement, any limitation with regard to the creation of mood and atmosphere, has to be avoided. Everything has to remain possible, all is to happen, the environment has to be created by the activity of life, and not inversely.

The New Babylon project consisted of a series of models, constructions, maquettes, collages, drawings, graphics and texts expressing Constant's theories of urban development and social interaction. A few examples of spatial constructions for which he used modern materials like stainless steel, aluminum and perspex are Het Ruimtecircus (1956) (Spatial Circus) and Het Zonneschip (1956) (Sunvessel).

In 1974 the New Babylon project officially came to an end with a large exhibition in the Gemeentemuseum Den Haag. Because he lacked room to store the vast collection of constructions, maquettes, maps and structures he sold them all to the museum. In 1999 Constant's New Babylon: City for Another Life, opened at the Drawing Center in New York. It was his first solo exhibition in the United States and was curated by Mark Wigley. There was a symposium conducted in conjunction with the exhibition.

According to the Dutch architect Rem Koolhaas, Nieuwenhuys has made a lot of architects think with his New Babylon: "He was an example of courage".

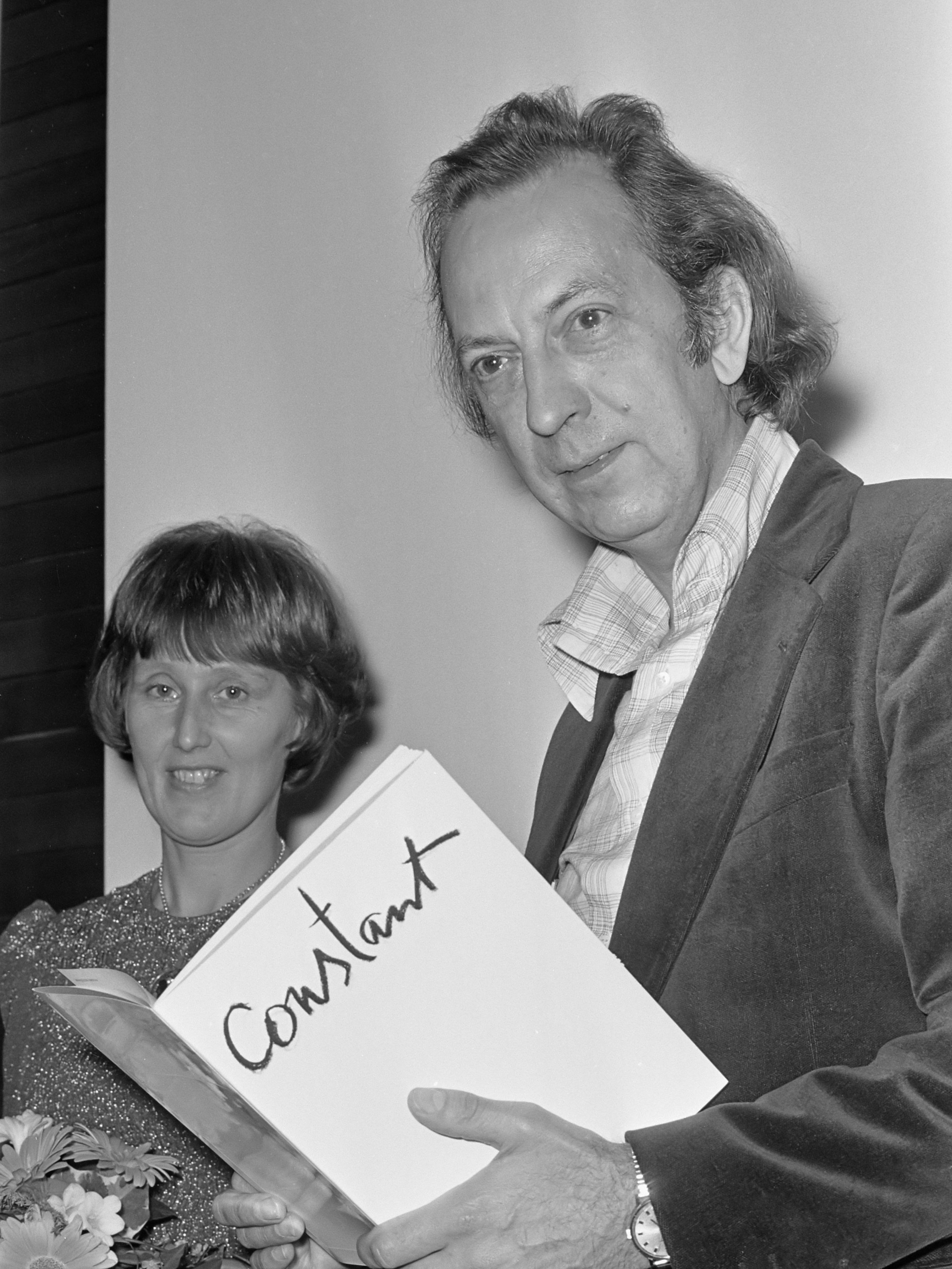
Constant Nieuwenhuys (1974)

== Colorism ==
Constant returned to painting, watercoloring and graphics in 1969. Until the mid-1970s, the subjects of his imaginary world New Babylon still crowded his work. However, more and more, he was inspired by contemporary and political issues, including such things as the Vietnam War, African famine and Kosovo refugees. Marxism was a strong influence. Rudi Fuchs said in his foreword to the Catalogue of Constant Paintings in 1995: "there are people who consider Constant's later work as a return to tradition. I, however, do not share this opinion. Because I consider his later development from the 1970s as greater penetration into the garden of painting."

In the tradition of the Venetian Renaissance painters, Titian and Tintoretto, Constant applied himself to the technique of colorism. Following this technique the artist doesn't make use of charcoal or pencil sketches but applies colour directly on the canvas with the paintbrush, constructing soft transitions instead of sharp contours. The most important feature of this technique is the way light is expressed in the painting by integrating it into the colour. This technique is laborious. The painting comes to life layer by layer. Constant painted with oil on canvas and every layer he applied then needed to dry. In this period Constant produced a mere three to four paintings per year.

== Public space ==
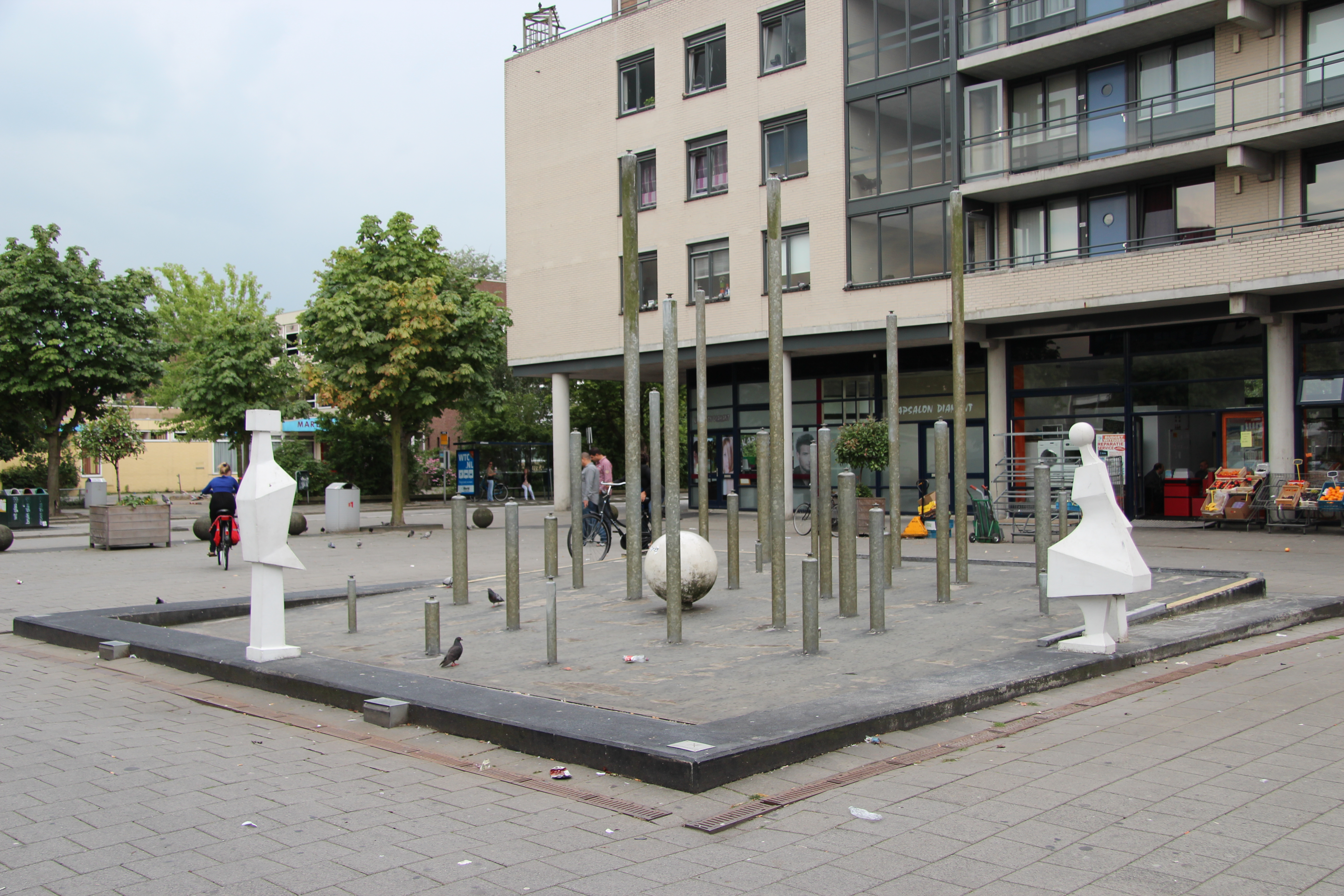
Constant Nieuwenhuis fountain - 1970, Kooiplein in Leiden

In 1949 Constant decorated a garden wall in Tibirkelunde, Sjelland, Denmark.

In 1963 The Gate of Constant was placed at the entry of a sports park in the west side of Amsterdam. Constant designed the forty-foot-high concrete structure as a commission for the Municipality of Amsterdam. For almost three decades the structure adorned the entry in anonymity until Rita Doets, a former employee of the municipality, left money in her legacy to construct an information sign next to the gate. Constant's widow, Trudy Nieuwenhuijs, was present at the inauguration.

In 1966 Constant designed a fountain for the Kooiplein in Leiden. For years the structure didn't function and slowly withered. When the square was redesigned in 1999, the fountain was repaired. New equipment made sure that the shoppers were not bothered by the water.

== Death ==
Constant died on 1 August 2005 in Utrecht and was survived by his son, his three daughters, his widow, and her daughter.

== Films ==
Gyromorphosis (1958), 7 min - In Gyromorphosis, film maker Hy Hirsh strives to display the kinetic qualities of the New Babylon structures of Constant Nieuwenhuys. One by one he puts parts of the structures in motion and films the details with colored lighting having them overlap each other, appear and disappear. He creates a sensation of acceleration and suspense suggested by the work itself.

Accompanying Simon Vinkenoog to Constant's New Babylon (1962), 15 min - Lies Westenburg visits Constant at his studio with writer Simon Vinkenoog. Simon Vinkenoog and Constant discuss the ideas behind the New Babylon project.

Constant oder der Weg nach New Babylon (1968), 55 min - For ten years Constant worked on his New Babylon project as a reaction to the architectural and social reality. Film maker Carlheinz Caspari follows Constant and his visions.

Cobra, a revolt against order (1986), 50 min - Documentary by Jan Vrijman about the meaning and influence of the COBRA group, then and now.

Constant, Avant le Départ (2005), 82 min - Constant died in the summer of 2005. Thomas Doebele and Maarten Schmidt filmed the artist during the last months of his life. They followed him and his dog, Tikus, on their daily stroll to the artist's studio, where he finished his last painting Le Piège.

New Babylon de Constant (2005), 13 min - New Babylon visually captured by Constant's son Victor Nieuwenhuijs and Maartje Seyfert.

== Exhibitions ==
This is an incomplete list of Constant's exhibitions over the years:

- 1940 at the Aalderink art gallery in Amsterdam (together with Hans Wiesman, first exhibition for Constant)
- 1947 Santee Landweer art gallery in Amsterdam (first solo exhibition for Constant)
- 1953 For a spatial colorisme in the Stedelijk Museum Amsterdam Constant with Aldo van Eijck
- 1956 XXVIII Esposizione Biennale Internazionale d'Arte, Venice
- 1959 II. Documenta, Kassel
- 1959 Constant. Constructions and models Stedelijk Museum Amsterdam
- 1961 Niw (sic!) Babylon in the Stedelijk Museum Schiedam
- 1964 4. Documenta, Kassel
- 1964 Académie Royale, Kopenhagen
- 1964–1965 '45-'85 Gemeentemuseum Den Haag
- 1966 New Babylon at the Biennale of Venice (Constant represented the Netherlands)
- 1967 New Babylon in Kunstnernes Hus, Oslo
- 1974 New Babylon, Gemeentemuseum Den Haag
- 1974–1975 Constant. An illustration of freedom [drawings 1945-74], Stedelijk Museum Amsterdam
- 1978 Constant. Paintings 1969-77, Stedelijk Museum Amsterdam
- 1980 Constant. Paintings 1940-1980, Gemeentemuseum Den Haag
- 1985 Work from the period 1975-1985, Centraal Museum in Utrecht
- 1985 Arbeiten auf Papier 1948-1985, in Kultur-historischen Museum der Stadt Bielefeldt
- 1986 Constant 1945-1983, Rheinisches Landesmuseum Bonn
- 1993 Constant. Drawings, Gemeentemuseum Den Haag
- 1994 Constant. Models / Constructions, Gemeentemuseum Den Haag
- 1994–1995 Constant. Œuvreprijs 1994, Chabot Museum, Rotterdam
- 1996 Constant: paintings 1948-1995, Stedelijk Museum Amsterdam & Nordjyllands Kunstmuseum Ålborg
- 1997 Situacionistes. Art, politica, urbanisme, Museu d'Art Contemporani de Barcelona (MACBA)
- 1998 Constant, etchings and lithographs, Museo de Bellas Artes de Caracas, Venezuela
- 1998–1999 Constant - New Babylon, Witte de With (Centrum voor hedendaagse kunst), Rotterdam
- 1999 Another City for Another Life: Constant's New Babylon, The Drawing Center, New York
- 2001 Constant, une rétrospective, Musée Picasso Antibes
- 2002 Constant. New Babylon, Documenta 11, Platform 5, Kassel Hauptbahnhof
- 2004 Constant graphic, Cobra Museum
- 2005–2006 Tribute to Constant, Gemeentemuseum Den Haag
- 2006 Play! The art of play, Cobra Museum
- 2008–2009 Constant. In his studio, Stedelijk Museum Schiedam
- 2009 Time as Matter. MACBA collection. New Acquisitions, Museu d'Art Contemporani de Barcelona
- 2009 Intensely Dutch, Art Gallery of New South Wales in Sydney, Australia
- 2011 Klee und Cobra. Ein Kinderspiel, Zentrum Paul Klee, Bern, Switzerland
- 2012 Klee and Cobra. A Child's Play, Louisiana Museum of Modern Art, Humlebaek and Cobra Museum

== Public collections ==
Constant's artworks can be found in the following public collections.

Dutch museums

- Amsterdam Museum (formerly known as Amsterdam's Historical Museum)
- Bonnefanten Museum, Maastricht
- Centraal Museum, Utrecht
- Cobra Museum for modern art, Amstelveen
- Gemeentemuseum Den Haag
- Groninger museum
- Kröller-Müller Museum, Otterlo
- Museum Boijmans van Beuningen, Rotterdam
- Rijksmuseum – Rijksprentenkabinet, Amsterdam
- Rijksmuseum Twenthe, Enschede
- Stadsgalerij Heerlen
- Stedelijk Museum Amsterdam
- Stedelijk Museum Schiedam
- Van Abbemuseum, Eindhoven

European museums

- Centre Georges Pompidou, Musée National dʼart moderne, Paris, France
- FRAC - le fonds régional dʼart contemporain et architecture de recherche - Orléans, France
- Krefelder Kunstmusea, Kaiser Wilhelm Museum, Krefeld, Germany
- Kunstmuseum Bochum, Bochum, Germany
- Kunsthalle in Emden, Germany
- Kunsten Museum of Modern Art Aalborg/Nordjyllands Kunstmuseum, Denmark
- Lehmbruck-Museum, Duisburg, Germany
- MACBA, Spain
- Museum Jorn, Silkeborg, Denmark
- Staatliche Museen, Neue Nationalgalerie, Berlin, Germany
- Tate Gallery, London
- Tate Modern, London

Museums outside Europe

- MoAFL, Museum of Art Fort Lauderdale, US
- SFMOMA, San Francisco Museum of Modern Art, US

== Awards ==
This is a list of awards granted to Constant.

- 1960 Sikkens Award (together with Aldo van Eyck)
- 1966 Premio Cardazzo at the Venice Biennale
- 1971 Royal decoration of 'Knight of the Order of Orange-Nassau' (refused)
- 1974 David Röell Award for his work as a draughtsman
- 1985 Singer Award for his entire body of work
- 1991 Resistance Award of the Foundation Artist Resistance 1942-1945
- 1994 Oeuvre Award from Foundation Fund for Fine Arts, Design & Engineering
