= Hulda Guzmán =

Dominican painter (born 1984)

- Born: 1984 (age 41–42); Santo Domingo, Dominican Republic
- Education: Altos de Chavón School of Design
- Website: hulda.com

Hulda Guzmán (born 1984) is a Dominican figurative painter whose work often depicts tropical settings and naturalistic motifs. Her paintings often include elements of magical realism and dream-like environments.

== Education ==
Hulda Guzmán was born in 1984 in Santo Domingo, Dominican Republic. She received a bachelor's degree from Altos de Chavón School of Design in the Dominican Republic, and a bachelor's degree in mural painting and photography from the National School of Visual Arts, Mexico.

== Work ==
Guzmán works in acrylic gouache, her work is often compared to Surrealism and pointillism. She attributes Rousseau and Van Gogh as inspirations as well as Mexican muralism, Dominican folk traditions, and Japanese ukiyo-e. Her studio is surrounded by wilderness and located in Lanza del Norte, Samaná. It was designed by her father, the architect Eddy Guzmán.

"I used to be a lot more interested in portraits and drawing in particular, especially drawings of the human figure, the contours of faces and anatomy in general. Now I'm more interested in landscapes and nature, but also how narrative and storytelling enter my work. I would say during the pandemic I really dived into portraying landscape. I found that contemplating nature and painting plants and trees helped me bring my attention back to the present moment. Nature diverted my mind from fear and anxiety."

== Exhibitions (selection) ==
In 2023, Guzmán presented two solo shows in the United States and Europe. In Fabula, organized by Von Bartha in Switzerland, the artist showcased a number of new paintings depicting house interiors, figure drawing paintings, and natural landscapes whereas at the Alexander Berggruen in New York City, the exhibition Hulda Guzmán: They come from water commented on climate change and environmental threats to the historically disadvantage home town of Santo Domingo and the Caribbean at large.

In 2026, Guzmán's work was on show in the Turner gallery, Margate, England in an exhibition entitled Please awake-asked Nature kindly.

== Collections ==
Her work is included the collections of many museums, including the Pérez Art Museum Miami; the Denver Art Museum; the San Francisco Museum of Modern Art; Institute of Contemporary Art Miami; the Patricia Phelps de Cisneros Collection, New York/Caracas; and Museu de Arte de São Paulo.
