= Magdalena de Guzmán =

Spanish courtier

Magdalena de Guzmán (around 1550 - 18 October 1621) was a Spanish courtier.

== Biography ==
She was the daughter of Lope de Guzmán y Guzmán de Aragón and his wife, Leonor de Luján. Her father was a magistrate in the service of King Philip II. Juan Guzmán, Patriarch of West Indies (1602-1605) was her brother.

In 1589, Magdalena married Martín Cortés, son of the conquistador Hernán Cortés and Marquis of the Valley of Oaxaca, II. Martín died in 1589 and Magdalena became a widow without descendants, serving as a Lady of honor.

She was the chief lady-in-waiting of three queens of Spain in succession: Elisabeth of Valois, Margaret of Austria, Queen of Spain and Elisabeth of France (1602–1644). She served as royal governess to Anne of Austria. Her offices made her an influential figure at court, particularly during the tenure of Margaret of Austria, during which she participated in the queen's court fraction against Francisco Gómez de Sandoval, 1st Duke of Lerma.
