= Noel Guzmán Boffil Rojas =

Cuban painter (1954–2021)

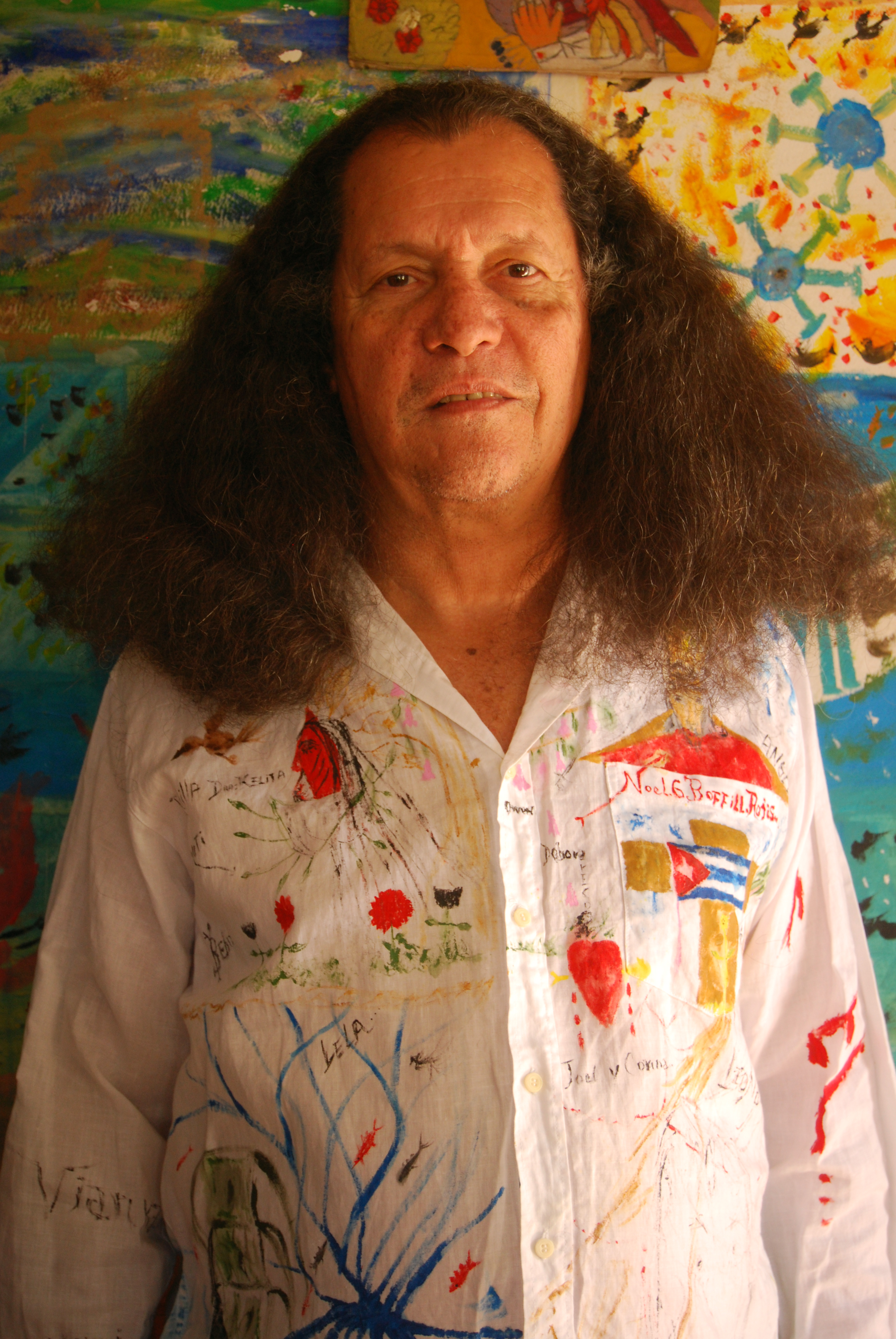
- Born: 4 August 1954; Remedios, Cuba
- Died: 3 August 2021 (aged 66); Santa Clara, Cuba

Noel Guzmán Boffil Rojas (4 August 1954 – 3 August 2021) was a Cuban painter.

== Career ==
With no academic education, Guzman was a self-taught artist. He was member of the artistic group Signos in Santa Clara, Cuba.

In 1987, he won the First Prize at the "Salón de Marinas" at the Galería Leopoldo Romañach in Caibarién, Villa Clara.

Since 1987, Guzman has formed part of many collective exhibitions like "Salón de Marinas", at the Galería Leopoldo Romañach in Caibarién, Villa Clara. In 1990, Guzman was included in "Inventario de Cosas Naturales. Pintores, Dibujantes y Escultores Populares de Cuba" in the Centro de Desarrollo de las Artes Visuales in Havana. In 1993, some of Guzman's works were included in the "VIII Bienal Internacional de Humorismo." at the Galería Eduardo Abela in San Antonio de los Baños, Havana.

Since 1989, Guzman has had various exhibitions. Some of them took place in the Galería de Arte, Biblioteca Nacional José Martí in Havana; Homenaje a Regino Boti (Homage to Regino Boti) in the Galería Orígenes at the Gran Teatro de La Habana and Vuelo de Colibrí at the Centro Cultural Recoleta in Buenos Aires, Argentina.

Guzman's works can be found in the museum Casa de las Américas, Havana; at the Centro Wifredo Lam, Havana and in the Museo Nacional de Bellas Artes de La Habana, Cuba.

== Death ==
He died from COVID-19 on 3 August 2021, at the age of 66, during the COVID-19 pandemic in Cuba.
