= Antonio Guzmán (footballer) =

Spanish footballer

Personal information
- Full name: Antonio Guzmán Núñez
- Date of birth: 2 December 1953 (age 72)
- Place of birth: Torrejón de Ardoz, Spain
- Height: 1.74 m (5 ft 9 in)
- Position: Midfielder

Youth career
- Rayo Vallecano

Senior career*
Years	Team	Apps	(Gls)
1973–1978	Rayo Vallecano	68	(5)
1975–1976	→ Talavera (loan)		
1978–1980	Atlético Madrid	49	(1)
1980–1981	Almería	24	(4)
1981–1982	Rayo Vallecano	9	(0)
1987–1988	Alcalá	23	(4)
Total		173	(14)

International career
1978	Spain	2	(0)
- * Club domestic league appearances and goals

Antonio Guzmán Núñez (born 2 December 1953) is a Spanish former footballer who played as a midfielder.

He played 91 games in La Liga, scoring a combined five goals for Rayo Vallecano, Atlético Madrid and Almería.

Guzmán appeared for the Spain national team at the 1978 World Cup.

== Club career ==
Born in Torrejón de Ardoz, Community of Madrid, Guzmán's professional career was mostly associated with local clubs Rayo Vallecano and Atlético Madrid. He helped the former promote to La Liga in 1977, and contributed with 27 games and one goal to the latter's third-place finish at the end of the 1978–79 season.

After several years of inactivity, 33-year-old Guzmán returned to active and joined Segunda División B team RSD Alcalá, also in his native region. Previously, in 1980–81, he appeared with AD Almería in their second-ever campaign in the top flight, equalling a career-best four goals but being relegated.

== International career ==
Guzmán earned two caps for Spain in 1978, and was part of the squad at that year's FIFA World Cup, where he featured in the 0–0 group stage draw against Brazil. His debut occurred on 24 May, in a friendly in Uruguay held before the tournament (same result).
