= Juan Guzmán (photographer) =

Mexican photojournalist (1911–1982)

Juan Guzmán (born Hans Gutmann, also known as "Juanito"; 28 October 1911 – 6 November 1982) was a German-born Mexican photojournalist. He was known as a war photographer of the Spanish Civil War and later on his work with Mexican painters Frida Kahlo and Diego Rivera.

== Life ==
Marina Ginestà at the top of Hotel Colón in Barcelona, 21 July 1936.

Hans Gutmann was born in Cologne. In 1936 he joined the Spanish Civil War as a volunteer of the International Brigades. Gutmann later became a Spanish citizen and changed his name to Juan Guzmán. There are more than 1,300 photographs from the Spanish Civil War in the archive of Agencia EFE (Madrid). His most famous image is the picture of 17-year-old Marina Ginestà standing in top of Hotel Colón in Barcelona. It is one of the most iconic photographs of the Spanish Civil War.

After the war Guzmán fled to Mexico, where he arrived in 1940. He worked for major Mexican magazines and newspapers and became a friend of Frida Kahlo with whom Guzmán shared similar political views. In the 1950s he took many photographs of Kahlo and her husband Diego Rivera. Guzmán also photographed the artwork of Mexican painters like Gerardo Murillo, Jesús Reyes Ferreira and José Clemente Orozco. Juan Guzmán died in Mexico City in 1982.

== Archive ==
Juan Guzmán's archive consists of about 170,000 photographs. Part of the material remained, while Guzmán was still alive, in the hands of the media where he had worked. In addition, he sold parts of his archive (for example, a series of 2000 pieces on Mexican art was sold by him to the INBA in the 1970s). The rest he left to his wife Teresa Miranda as an inheritance, and she sold the archive to the Televisa Foundation in 2006. There are only a few series held in other hands, such as the 2000 negative images sold to EFE in 1987; various photographic works related to Mexican art sold to UNAM in the early 1990s; photos about foot and mouth disease and other rural subjects, to the Universidad Autónoma Chapingo.
