= Mancoba =

Mancoba is a surname. Notable people with the surname include:

- Ernest Mancoba (1904–2002), South African sculptor, painter, and drawer
- Sonja Ferlov Mancoba (1911–1984), Danish sculptor
