= Richard Winther =

Danish artist (1926–2007)

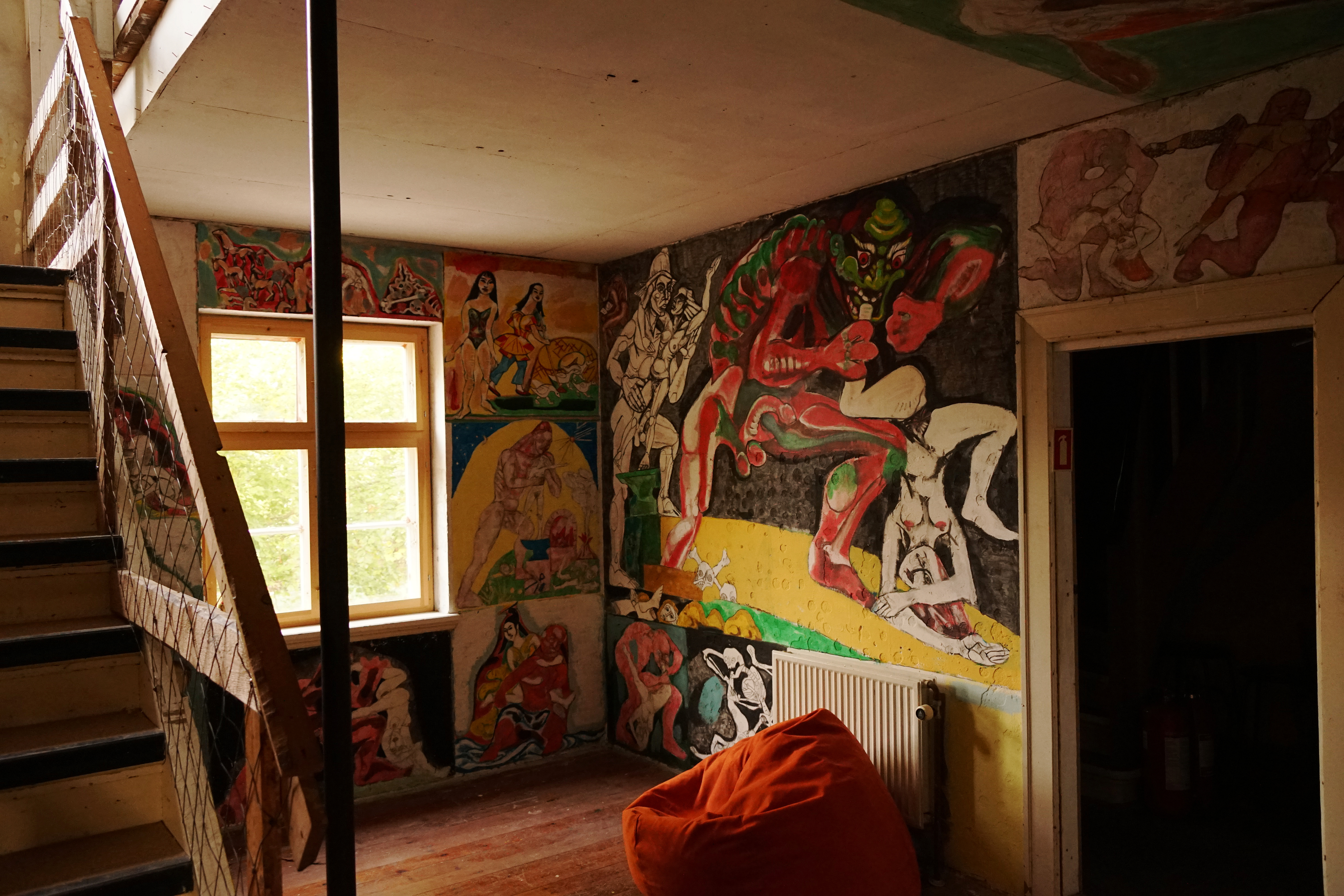
Interior of Richard Winthers Hus in Vindeby

Richard Ludvig Philip Weibull Winther (23 July 1926, Maribo – 30 August 2007, Vindeby, Denmark) was a Danish artist. He focused on painting, graphics, photography and sculpture. Richard's work was influenced by Asger Jorn and Richard Mortensen, both Danish artists part of the Linien group.

== Background ==
Winther was the youngest of three children, born to Carl Christian Winther and Ely Maria Ricardis Weibull. He grew up in a sugar factory. Interested in the arts from an early age, Winther began creating art at age ten and exhibited his paintings during high school, inspired by the Linien (The Line) artists. Records of his work date back to the early 1940s. His father, an engineer, influenced Winther's systematic approach to both work and other interests. Motivated by his father and older brother Lambert's passion for photography, Winther began taking photographs at ten and later built cameras to move beyond conventional photography. He experimented with various techniques, including drawing, painting, photography, film, graphic printing, sculpture, and collage. He also explored writing, as well as textile and furniture design, often blending themes across these mediums.

== Career ==
Richard Winther was a student at the Royal Danish Academy of Fine Arts where later he became a professor. He founded the exhibition group Linien II (1947–52), a follow-up from Linien with other young artists. This work initially focused on a spontaneous-abstract style of painting but with time transformed into a geometric-abstract type of movement. Linien II was primarily associated with the concrete art movement. Subsequently, Winther experimented with some of the abstract characteristics of the De Stijl/Konkret Art movements, bringing those styles into parts of his work. He also adventured into lithography during the 1950s. Later, his focus shifted to painting the human body. He was a member of Eks-Skolen, which was founded in 1961 by one of his friends, the artist Poul Gernes. There, he taught several upcoming artists, including Per Kirkeby. Winther's interest in photography from his childhood never diminished—he dedicated a significant part of the 1960s to the technique, which he would revisit time after time throughout the following decades, including his final years.

Richard Winther's work is marked by particular themes such as Hieronymus and the biblical flood. Many of these themes fit the idea of recycled classicism. Between 1994 and 2007 he took the idea of recycling forward, making many of his pieces in cardboard. This theme developed, as Winther's work began to build on the lives and works of previous artists. An example of this approach is illustrated by the pieces Winther generated on Wie, referring to the Danish neoclassical sculptor Johannes Wiedewelt. Gammel Holtegaard exhibited several of these pieces in 2005.

Richard Winther received several awards for his work: the Eckersberg Medal in 1971, the Thorvaldsen Medal in 1997, and the Prince Eugen Medal.

Richard Winther was also involved in the movie The Wake directed by Michael Kvium and Christian Lemmerz where he was the character St Patrick.

He was a member of the following groups: Arme og Ben, Decembristerne, Linien II, and Den Frie Udstilling.

There was a permanent collection of his work at the Silkeborg Kunstmuseum in Denmark, THE EX-SCHOOL, that ran until 16 December 2022. The exhibition features some of the most striking works from the Ex-School's active period (1961–1969), along with later pieces by its representatives, including Per Kirkeby, Peter Louis-Jensen, Richard Winther, Bjørn Nørgaard, Poul Gernes, Roger Martyn Pring, Lene Adler Petersen, and John Davidsen.

== Selected exhibitions ==
Art groups: Arme & Ben (Luzern 1976, Århus 1977, Tranegården 1977 + 1980, Willumsen Museet 1978, Hedegårdsskolen 1981, Tørring 1982, Aragonien 1983), Decembristerne (1960-1964, 1971, 1973-1975, 2008, 2018), Linien II (1947-1950).

Museums: Fuglsang Kunstmuseum (2012), Glyptoteket (1981, 1984, 1988), Museet i Sundsvall (1972), Museum Jorn (2010), Randers Kunstmuseum (1970), Statens Museum for Kunst (1975 (Kobberstiksamlingen), 1988), Stevns Museum (1963), Thorvaldsens Museum (1966, 2018).

Galleries: Borch (Berlin 2014), Clausens Kunsthandel / Banja Rathnov Galleri (1954, 2011, 2014, 2016, 2018), Daner Galleriet (1977), Galleri DAMP (2011), Galleri Klejn (2013), Galleri Köpcke (1959), Galleri Ole Jensen (1966, 1972, 1974), Galleri Tom Christoffersen (2012, 2013, 2021), Niels Macholms Kunsthandel (1943, 1952), P. H. Nielsen (Fåborg, 1967), Tal R galleri (2013).

Libraries: Helsingør (1974, 2019), Hvidovre (1973), Lyngby (1970), Stege (2001), Tåsinge og Svendborg (1952).

Other venues: Fotografisk Center (København, 2011), Gammel Holtegaard (2005), Grafik Galleriet (Næstved, 2017), Kunstforeningen (1968, 1971), Lys over Lolland (2010, 2015), Maison du Danemark (Paris, 1980), Møstings Hus (Frederisksberg, 2011), Nikolaj (København, 1989), Richard Winthers Hus (Vindeby, 2012-2023), Trefoldigheden (København, 1951), UMass Art Gallery (Dartmouth, Massachusetts, 2009).

== Selected writings ==
Richard Winther, 12 juni 1947, Digte af Winther, Linien II Udstilling 1947, p. 4.

Richard Winther, 1947, Samtale med GIACOMETTI, Linien II Udstilling 1947, p. 5.

Richard Winther, 1949, Et besøg hos Georges Vantongerloo, Linien 1949, p. 3-4.

Richard Winther, 1949, Kinetisk billedkunktion, Linien 1949, p. 4.

Gro Vive (R. Winther), 1949, den nøgenfrøede, 27 digte 1943-49, privattryk, 26 p.

Richard Winther, 1962, Lidt om Serge Poliakoff, Hvedekorn, nr. 1, februar 1962, p. 17-18.

Richard Winther, 1962, Atelierbesøg hos Man Ray, Hvedekorn nr. 2, april 1962, p. 45-47.

Richard Winther, 1963, Jean Deyrolle, Hvedekorn, nr. 1, feb. 1963, p. 3.

Richard Winther, 1966, Om Giacometti, Billedkunst nr. 2-66 p. 13-17.

Ricardo da Winti (R. Winther), 1972, Stature i stentøj etc. trykt i Streg og Niépce, Forlaget Sommersko.

Richard Winther, 1972, Atelierbesøg hos man Ray, Louisiana Revy, 12 årgang, nr. 3, pp. 3–4.

Richard Winther, 1974, Min muses billedbog, not paginated.

Richard Winther, 1975–76, Kompendium til undervisning på Kunstakademiet, 81 p. text + 30 p. of illustrations.

Rdo da Winti (R. Winther), 1977, Indirekte Rejse beskrivelse, ANAGRAM, 46 p.

Den Danske Raderforening, 1977, Oeuvrekatalog over Richard Winther's Grafik 1845-1960, 127 p.

Richardo da Winti (R. Winther), 1978, Den hellige Hieronymus' damekreds. Borgens Forlag, 656 p.

Ricardo da Nivå, 1978. Radeerforeninges Danske Hieronymus og hans venner, Ator Tryk.

Richard Winther, 1980, Tableau-Vivant, (includes text by Flemming Johansen), Maison du Danemark, 105 p.

Richard Winther, 1983, Kunstteori – i Praksis, Eks-Skolens Forlag, 104 p.

Richard Winther, 1988, Modelfotografier 1967-1986, Introduction by Flemming Johansen. Ny Carlsberg Glyptotek, 36 p.

Richard Winther, 1988, Frederikshavnerteksten, Selde, 50 s.

Richard Winther, 1993, Elektriciteten, p. 62-67, i Flemming Johansen (ed.), Skabelsens flodhest, Ny Carlsberg Glyptotek, 107 p.

Richard Winther & S. Møller Rasmussen, 2000, Vildledende vejledning i tegnepraxis, Space Poetry, 48 p.

Rdo (R.W.), 2004, Wie-teksten. Lærebog i Wieologi for begyndere baseret på personlige erfaringer, privattryk, 191 p. + Efterskrift 16 s.

Richard Winther, 2006, Samtale med Giacometti, p. 173-175 i Malertekster, published by Det Kgl. Danske Kunstakademis Billedskolder, 183 p.

Richard Winther, 2013, Et besøg hos Giacometti 20-5-1948 – i 23 fotografier af R. Winther, Reproduction of previously unpublished book from 1955, Forlaget Bangsbohave.

== Selected film and audio ==
Richard Winther, 1947–48, Triple Boogie, 4 min. Republished by Danish Film Institute, 2008 as part of "Danske Eksperimentalfilmklassikere".

Richard Winther, 1948, maskinsymfoni nr. 2 og bruitistisk improvisation. Genudgivet på LP af Magnus Kaslov, 2022, Linien fri af lærredet, Om Linien II's lydeksperimenter fra 1948-49, Institut for Dansk Lydarkæologi, LP plus 24 p. booklet.

Richard Winther, 1949, Klodsstudie, 3 min. film.

Richard Winther, 1956–58, Vues animées de l'Atelier et Collection Richard Winther, 12 min. Republished by Danish Film Institute, 2008 as part of Danske Eksperimentalfilmklassikere.

Steen Møller Rasmussen & Richard Winther, 2005, Wie, 16 min.

== Selected illustrations ==
Richard Winther 1947, Linien II exhibition catalogue cover.

Richard Winther, 1953, cover of Hvedekorn, Nr. 4, Maj 1953.

H. C. Andersen, 1981, Lille Claus og Store Claus, Eks-Skolens Forlag, 205 p., Winther made the illustrations on p. 43, 47, 55, 79, 81, 83, 95, 113, 127, 141, 147, 157, 175 and 195.

Ksenia Grigorjeva, 1989, Russiske Lægeplanter – som findes i Danmark – og deres brug. Winther made illustrations nr. 13, 56, 59, 66 and 99. Borgen, 259 p.

R. Winther, Hvedekorn no. 4, 2009, Photos by Winther on p. 6, 11, 15, 17, 19, 23, 24, 28, 31, 35, 37, 41 ,45, 47, 48, 51, 55 and the front / back cover.

== Selected writings about Richard Winther ==
Weilbach Dansk Kunstnerleksikon, 2000, vol. 9, p. 135-137.

Bent Irve, 2002, Om Richard Winther, p. 26-29 in De udvalgte, Århus Kunstforening af 1847, 32 p.

Jacob Thage (red.), 2005, Richard Winther: Wiedewelt, Gammel Holtegaard, 215 p.

Troels Andersen, Jørgen Gammelgaard, Jacob Thage & Tove Thage, 2008, Richard Winther, Billeder og Tolkninger, Borgen, 218 p.

Lasse Antonsen, 2008, Richard Winther, Theatrum Rdo, University Art Gallery, U.Mass. Dartmouth, 24 p.

E. H. O'Neill, 2008, Ambiances d'artistes, Éditions de La Martinière, p. 34-47 (Brute, punk et génie).

Steen Møller Rasmussen, 2009, Tjener for en bydreng. Richard Winther og mig., Forlaget Plagiat, 160p.

Jacob Thage (red.), 2010, Richard Winther Fotografi | Photography, Museum Jorn, 335 p.

K. Tobias Winther, 2010, Richard Winther – en skildring af min far, kunstneren Richard Winther, 33 p.

Jørgen Gammelgaard & T. Kjølsen, 2010, Richard Winther – om det grafiske værk, p. 12-21 in Billedkunst, vol. 17, no. 3.

Steen Møller Rasmussen, 2011, Richard Winther og Frederiksberg, Møstings Hus, 160 p.

Jørgen Gammelgaard & Steen Møller Rasmussen, 2012, Rdo Vindebymesteren, Vægmalerierne i Richard Winthers hus på Lolland, Forlaget Vandkunsten, 160 p.

Christian Vind, 2012, En samling arbejder af Richard Winther, Hvidpapirfeber, Privattryk, 50 p.

Tine Nielsen Fabienke, Mette Højsgaard & Anneli Fuchs, 2012, Richard Revival, konkrete og konstruktive tendenser hos Richard Winther, Fuglsang Kunstmuseum, 126 p.

Birgitte Anderberg, 2012, Richard Winther og Ringridersken, historien om et forlist monument, Statens Museum for Kunst #05-2012, Museumsklubben, p. 2-11.

Jørgen Gammelgaard, 2013, Rdo – en Richard Winther ABC, Forlaget Vandkunsten, 64 p.

Thorvald Berthelsen (red.), 2013, Richard Winthers Syndfold og Dommedag, Elleve forfattervinkler, Forlaget Ravnerock, 50 p.

Nick Geboers, 2016, De magie van het technische beeld – over de fotografie van Richard Winther, p. 65-72 i Extra 20, Fotografie in context, Apparaat, FotoMuseum Provincie Antwerpen.

Jørgen Gammelgaard & Tove Thage (red.), 2016, Ricardo da Winti et al, ti artikler om kunsneren Richard Winthers liv og værk, Forlaget Vandkunsten, 237 p.

Grethe Bull Sarning, 2018, Den Richard jeg kendte, Forlaget Sniksnak, 95 p.

Richard Winthers hus Vindeby, 2019, Det 2. bud, udstillingskatalog, 60 p.

Kristoffer Juul, Caroline Gudmandsen, et al., 2020, Paris-Vindeby tur-retur, Magasinet IN, mode / interview / kultur / rejser, Februar 2020, p. 64-79.

Julie Vöge, 2022, Eneboerens overmalede hjem, Bolius, Videncentret Bolius, Maj 2022, Nr. 114, p 42-45.

Alfred Gynther Christensen, 2023, Richard Winther og roerne, p. 66-72 in Alfred Gynther Christensen (ed.), 2023, Sukkereventyret på Lolland og Falster 1873-2023, LollandBibliotekerne, 336 p.
