= Gadegaard =

Gadegaard is a Danish surname. Notable people with the surname include:

- Anne Gadegaard (born 1991), Danish singer-songwriter
- Daniel Gadegaard (born 2001), Danish footballer
- Paul Gadegaard (1920–1992), Danish painter and sculptor
- Sofia Gadegaard Shah (born 1997), Nepalese swimmer
