= Listed buildings in Herning Municipality =

This list of listed buildings in Hernin Municipality lists listed buildings in Herning Municipality, Denmark.

== The list ==
Listing name	Image	Location	Year built	Contributing resource	Ref
Angligården		Birk Centerpark 3, 7400 Herning	1966	Former factory from 1966 designed by C.F. Møller and C. Th. Sørensen with murals by Carl-Henning Pedersen and Paul Gadegaard; the interior courtyard; The parking lot, the grove	Ref4
Herningsholm		Viborgvej 72, 7400 Herning	c 1580	Manor house from c. 1580 and later	Ref
Missionshuset Nasaret		Avlumvej 5, 7400 Herning	1769	Mission house from 1889	Ref
Møltrup(3)		Møltrupvej 70, 7480 Vildbjerg	1777	Manor house consisting of three detached wings from 1777	Ref
Sindinggård		Sindinggårdvej 21, 7400 Herning	c. 1837	The main wing Originally from c. 1630 but adapted to its current appearance in c. 1837	Ref
Tinghuset		Østergade 9, 7400 Herning	1893	Two-winged, two-storey building from 1893 by Claudius August Wiinholt and Andreas Hagerup	Ref
