= Linien =

Danish artists' association

Linien (meaning "The Line") was an artists' association in Denmark in the 1930s and 1940s focusing on Abstraction and Symbolism. The group's exhibitions in Copenhagen created wide international participation. After the Second World War, the association was revived as Linien II with an emphasis on Concrete art.

== Background ==
In the 1930s, art moved into a new phase experiments in the theoretical and intellectual use of shapes and symbols while at the same time a symbolism emerged from the world of dreams. This was the basis for Concrete art and Surrealism which became the latest trend in the international Avant-garde movement. The association of Abstraction and Surrealism was pioneered by Vilhelm Bjerke-Petersen who in 1930 joined the Bauhaus School in Weimar, a key Avant-garde institution which revolutionized not just painting but architecture, sculpture, literature, theatre and dance. Bauhaus is remembered for its influence on Abstract art and Functionalist architecture and design. At the Bauhaus, Bjerke Petersen had studied under Wassily Kandinsky and Paul Klee and was thus familiar with contemporary theories of abstract art. This led to the publication in 1933 of Symboler i abstrakt kunst (Symbols in Abstract Art) which served as a manifesto for the movement in Denmark.

== The association ==
In 1934, together with Ejler Bille and Richard Mortensen, Petersen founded Linien which covered both Abstraction and Symbolism. Together with its accompanying journal, also called Linien, the movement was a forum for new, revolutionary art in Denmark providing a "line" through all fields of art and culture. The first issue of the journal, which was published in conjunction with the association's opening exhibition on 15 January 1934, presented the movement as a group of abstract-surrealist artists who would endeavor to provide support for innovative art. The first exhibition presented 177 works and was seen by 2,500 visitors.

In 1935, Vilhelm Bjerke-Petersen, who had become more interested in pure Surrealism, invited Wilhelm Freddie and Harry Carlsson to participate in the large international exhibition on Cubism and Surrealism instead of Bille and Mortensen. The exhibition is considered to be one of the most important in Denmark, bringing together Erik Olson, Jean Arp, Max Ernst, Paul Klee, Joan Miró, Salvador Dalí and Yves Tanguy. Bille and Mortensen terminated their collaboration with Petersen and in 1937 put on a kind of repeat international exhibition of Cubism-Surrealism with Abstract and Constructive artists including Theo van Doesburg, Piet Mondrian, Wassily Kandinsky and Sophie Taeuber-Arp together with the Surrealists Max Ernst, Paul Klee, Joan Miró and Yves Tanguy and a considerable number of Danish artists. Linien's last exhibition was held in 1939 with the participation of Mortensen, Bille, Egill Jacobsen and the sculptor Sonja Ferlov.

== Follow-up ==
In 1947, a number of artists including Ib Geertsen, Bamse Kragh-Jacobsen, Niels Macholm, Albert Mertz and Richard Winther created Linien II with an exhibition in Tokanten's gallery in Copenhagen. Other members of the group included Vilhelm Bjerke Petersen, Richard Mortensen, Sonja Ferlov Mancoba, Robert Jacobsen, Paul Gadegaard, Gunnar Aagaard Andersen, Henrik Buch, Helge Jacobsen, Søren Georg Jensen and Knud Nielsen. An exhibition the following year presented Constructive works, providing support for Concretism in Denmark. In 1950, Linien II held Denmark's largest exhibition of Concrete art with wide international participation including works by Wassily Kandinsky, Fernand Léger, Jean Arp, Le Corbusier, Auguste Herbin, Alexander Calder, Victor Vasarely, Alberto Magnelli and Jean Dewasne. The event led to the withdrawal of the French as well as Mortensen and Jacobsen who did not take part in the last two exhibitions held in 1951 and 1952. These did however attract a considerable number of American artists including Josef Albers. Although Linien II was dissolved in 1952, two further exhibitions were held: Linien 3, konkret realisme (Linien 3, Concrete Realism) in 1956 and Linien igen (Linien Again) in 1958. They presented works by more recent Concrete artists including Ole Schwalbe, Jørn Larsen and Mogens Lohmann.

== Bibliography ==
- Bjerke Petersen, Vilhelm: Symboler i abstrakt kunst, republished 1974, Silkeborg Kunstmuseum, 86 pp with illustrations.
