= Hammerum burial site =

Archaeological site in Central Denmark

The Hammerum burial site is an archaeological excavation located about 5 km east of Herning, Denmark, on Ny Gjellerupvej. The site has been dated to the late Roman Iron Age (200–400 CE) and contained preserved fabric from graves of that era.

== History of excavation ==
In 1993, initial stages of new road development revealed traces of several graves throughout the land slated for construction. Seven graves were discovered upon further excavation. Four of these showed little historical significance; the three remaining graves contained organic materials that would prompt further analysis. These graves were transferred to Herning Museum in complete blocks of earth to preserve any hidden materials for further study, and were fully excavated and analysed after 2008, when further funding was available.

== Graves 8 and 100 ==
Of the three graves brought to Herning Museum, Grave 8 was the only one excavated upon arrival; inside, archaeologists discovered an empty but well-preserved wooden coffin. Several samples of the wood were taken from the coffin for study. These wood samples have so far yielded two very different ranges for the date of the grave: 3355-3103 BCE and 375-203 BCE. This notable discrepancy has been attributed to either a mistake made during conservation treatment or a related issue during excavation and has yet to be fully resolved.

Grave 100, excavated in 2008, contained several subjects of interest: an as yet indeterminable organic substance; remains of human hair arranged in such a design as to indicate a female wearer; and sparse remains of animal hide. While the bones of the deceased had already decomposed, their shadow remained imprinted in the grave and thus revealed the position of the occupant; the body had been lying on its left side with its legs bent before its chest. The significance of this pose has not yet been researched.

== The Hammerum Girl ==
In Grave 83, similarly to Grave 100, the only remains of the deceased is a preserved complex coiffure; this, combined with the size of the grave, indicates that the deceased was either a large girl or a young woman. The grave has thus been labelled the Hammerum Girl.

The grave contains unusually well-preserved clothing. Twelve threads of its wool fibers have been analyzed to determine the date and to discover information about the Hammerum Girl and her society. The threads have been dated to 78-313 CE, closely matching the date of the coffin lid, which has been identified as between 73 and 313 CE; the dating of the Hammerum Girl's hair has returned with a range of 1-130 CE; the discrepancies between this date and that of the clothing and coffin lid have been attributed to possible contamination of the hair sample during analysis. The dating of Grave 8 has proven close to that of the Hammerum Girl.

The condition of the Hammerum Girl's textiles is in contrast to that from previous grave sites from the Roman Iron Age which have lacked well-preserved samples. Three pieces of clothing have been identified; one is a dress and another as a scarf. The dress material indicates several details about the style of the time period; it is colored, including red, and is covered with decorative scales. However, analyses of the fabric have provided no evidence of dyed threads, so the source of the coloration is unknown.

The quality of the wool clothing varies among the pieces. The dress and scarf contain the largest amount of fine fibers, although coarser fibers were sorted from each item before spinning, demonstrating a relative care for their construction. Studies of the wool have traced the material to sheep who would have pastured in Denmark; the sparse remains of animal hide also located in the grave that appear to originate in Norway or Bornholm.

Studies of the cereal pollen in the wool show a percentage of about 12%; one explanation for its presence is that the Hammerum Girl might have worn these clothes while preparing grain. These clothes may then represent everyday wear and illustrate common fashion for women of the settlement. Alternate theories include the possibility of a cereal offering placed by mourners atop the Hammerum Girl's body upon her burial, or a threshing ritual at the funeral. These proposals have been shown to be less likely because similar pollen has not been found in the surrounding earth.

The burial contained none of the metal objects that often act as grave goods; besides the wool clothing, three ceramic shards and one bone pin were discovered. The bone pin is believed to be baleen due to analyses of its bromine content.

In 2014 the Hammerum Girl is located at Herning Museum, where her clothing has been kept in its original position in the grave for display to the museum's visitors.

== The surrounding landscape ==
The organic materials located in each of the graves at Hammerum, combined with further study of the area itself, have shed light on the surrounding landscape during the late Roman Iron Age. Analyses of the pollen found in the soil layer around the Hammerum Girl's clothing have revealed that hazel trees were prominent in certain dry zones; red alder would have appeared around a nearby stream. Heaths and meadows dominated the open areas that remained free from trees. The pollen found on the Hammerum Girl's clothing indicates that fields reserved specifically for agriculture would have had their place in the landscape.
