= Herning Museum of Contemporary Art =

Contemporary art museum in Herning, Denmark

Coordinates: 56°07′55″N 09°01′19″E

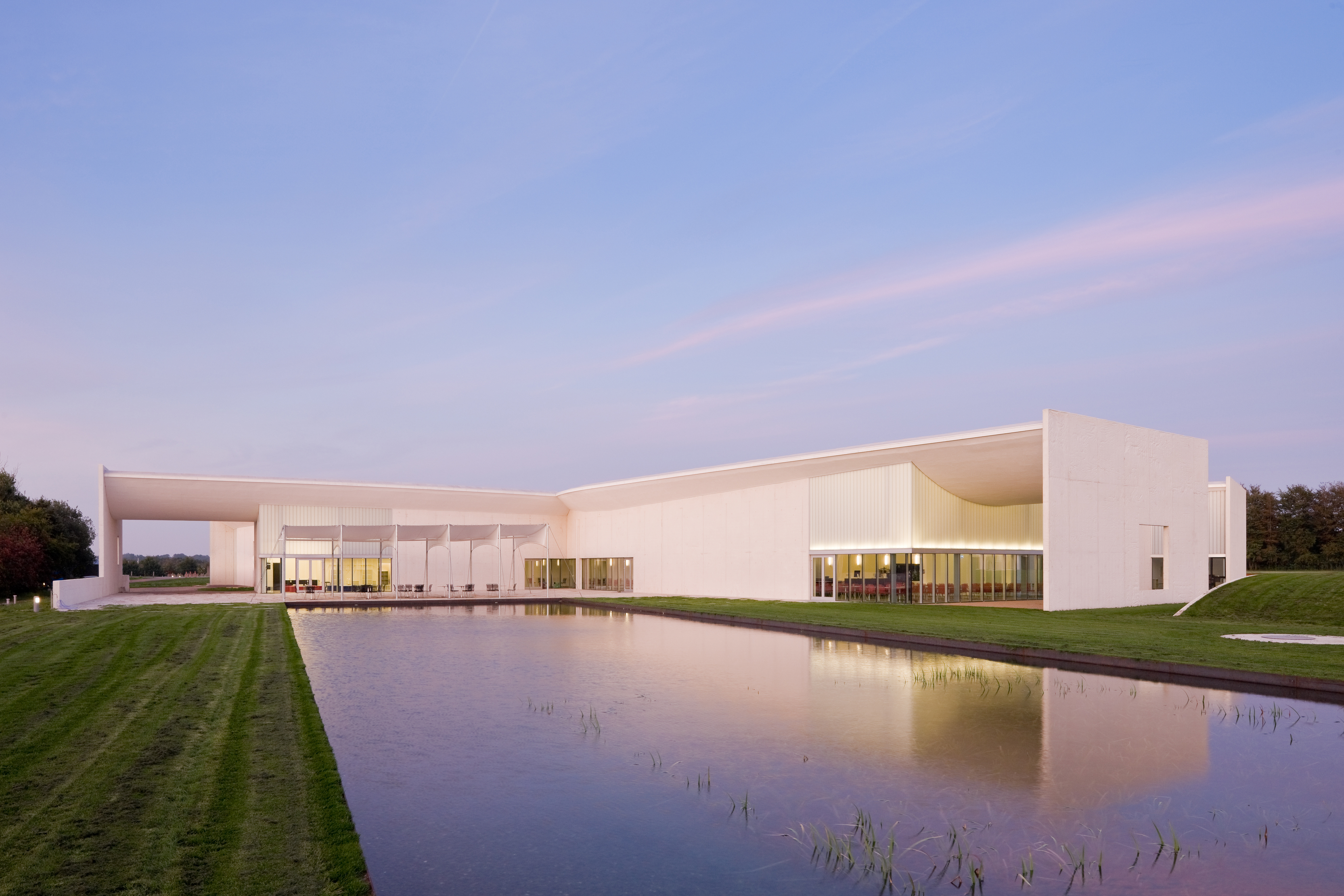
Herning Museum of Modern Art

Heart: Herning Museum of Contemporary Art, formerly Herning Kunstmuseum, was founded in Herning, Denmark, in 1976. It opened in 1977 in Angligården, an old shirt factory designed by C. F. Møller. In 2009, it reopened in new premises designed by the American architect Steven Holl.

== History ==
The art museum was originally established in Aage Damgaard's Angli shirt factory. It contains works by Paul Gadegaard (who decorated the factory in the 1950s), Victor Vasarely, Piero Manzoni, Richard Mortensen, Asger Jorn and Carl-Henning Pedersen. There is also a large collection of sculptural works by Ingvar Cronhammar.

On 9 September 2009, the museum opened in a new building designed by the American architect Steven Holl. The new building also contains works by Bjørn Nørgaard, Joseph Beuys, Mario Merz, Knud Hvidberg, John Kørner and Troels Wörsel.

== Architecture ==
The new building is designed to accommodate both a museum of visual art and a concert hall. It houses the museum's permanent exhibition, galleries for temporary exhibitions as well as an auditorium seating 150, rehearsal rooms, a medial library and offices. In an attempt to reflect Herning's textile tradition and earlier shirt production, the building when viewed from above resembles a collection of shirt sleeves while the white concrete exterior walls exhibit a fabric texture.

== Opening times ==
The museum is normally open to visitors every day except Mondays from 10 am to 5 pm. It may however be closed occasionally for special arrangements.
