= Sonja Ferlov Mancoba =

Danish sculptor

- Born: Sonja Ida Ferlov; 1 November 1911; Copenhagen, Denmark
- Died: 17 December 1984 (aged 73); 14th arrondissement, Paris, France
- Resting place: Assistens Cemetery
- Education: The School of Arts and Crafts; Royal Danish Academy of Fine Arts
- Alma mater: École des Beaux-Arts
- Movement: CoBrA
- Spouse: Ernest Mancoba
- Children: Marc Mancoba
- Parents: Niels Ejnar Jørgensen Ferlov (father); Minna Emilie Caroline Ferlov née Osten (mother)

Sonja Ferlov Mancoba (1 November 1911 – 17 December 1984) was a Danish avant-garde sculptor.

== Biography ==
She attended the École des Beaux-Arts in Paris and was affiliated with the CoBrA group, along with her husband, South African artist Ernest Mancoba.

Ferlov Mancoba was trained as a painter. She studied under Bizzie Høyer from 1930 to 1932 and at the Royal Danish Academy of Fine Arts from 1933 to 1935. She debuted at the annual Artists' Autumn Salon (Kunstnernes Efterårsudstilling) in 1935 with two plaster sculptures, Bird with Young and Two Living Beings. From the mid-1930s she was involved with the artists' group and art journal Linien (The Line, 1934–39), which was the first conduit of French Surrealism to Denmark. During this time she was influenced by and an influence on the "abstract-Surrealist" artists and Linien co-founders Ejler Bille, Vilhelm Bjerke-Petersen, and Richard Mortensen. Her early sculptural assemblages of branches and organic materials (Objet trouvés) were influenced by the Dada sculptures of Hans Arp and Kurt Schwitters. In 1936 she exhibited, among other works, the sculpture The Owl (destroyed).

In 1937 she settled in Paris, where she met and socialized with the Surrealist artists Max Ernst and Alberto Giacometti, whose studio was in the same building as hers. It was at this time that she met Ernest Mancoba, whom she married in 1942; their son Wonga (1946–2015) would eventually also become a respected artist. In Denmark Ferlov Mancoba was already interested in non-Western art; in Paris she developed her knowledge of ethnographic objects at the newly reopened Musée de l'Homme. After a brief return to Copenhagen at the beginning of the war, she spent the remainder of the war in France, where Ernest Mancoba was interned in a prisoner-of-war camp.

From 1947 through 1951 Ferlov Mancoba was in Denmark, where she exhibited as a guest with the artists' groups Linien II (The Line II, 1949-?) and Høst (Harvest, 1948). From 1952 she was based in France. In 1969 she became a member of Den Frie Udstilling (The Free Exhibition, est. 1891).

Ferlov Mancoba's biomorphic sculptures either use or evoke organic materials and forms. Around 1948 she also briefly made geometric abstract sculptural work.

She received the Tagea Brandts travel grant in 1971, a Statens Kunstfond (National Art Fund) award in 1964, the Thorvaldsen Medal in 1971, and the Niels Larsen-Stevns Medal in 1977.

Ferlov Mancoba is represented in the following collections: Aarhus Kunstmuseum, Holstebro Kunstmuseum, Den Kongelige kobberstiksamling, Louisiana Museum of Modern Art, Brandts Museum of Photographic Art, Moderna Museet, Museum Jorn, Silkeborg, Statens Museum for Kunst, Kunsten - Museum of modern Art Aalborg.
