= FK Jerv =

Norwegian sports club

- Full name: Fotballklubben Jerv
- Founded: August 5, 1921; 105 years ago
- Ground: J.J. Ugland Stadion - Levermyr, Grimstad
- Capacity: 3,300
- Chairman: Per Gunnar Topland
- Head Coach: Arne Sandstø
- League: Second Division
- 2026: Second Division Group 1, 1st of 14 (promoted)
- Website: www.fkjerv.no
Home colours	Away colours

Fotballklubben Jerv is a Norwegian football club from Grimstad. Jerv is the Norwegian name for wolverine. They currently play in the Norwegian Second Division, the third tier of Norwegian football.

== History ==
The club was founded in 1921, as Vestergatens FK, named after the street in which the foundation took place, but later changed name to Djerv and then Jerv.

In the 1970s and 1980s the team had a number of foreign coaches, including Bo Johansson who managed the team in 1984 and 1985 and went on to coach several clubs and national teams. In November 2007 Jerv signed another well-known ex-footballer Tore André Dahlum as coach.

In 2021, Jerv were promoted to the top division, Eliteserien, for the first time in their history. They were promoted through the play-offs, where they beat Brann in the final. The score was 4–4 after extra time, but Jerv won 8–7 on penalties.

FK Jerv has no women's section, as this split away in 1999 to form a new club Amazon Grimstad FK.

== Season-by-season record ==
Season	League									Cup	Top goalscorer	
Season	Division	P	W	D	L	F	A	Pts	Pos	Cup	Name	Goals
1948/49	2. divisjon	12	9	1	2	40	18	19	1st	R2		
1949/50	2. divisjon	12	6	2	4	19	19	14	2nd	DNQ		
1950/51	2. divisjon	12	6	4	2	31	17	16	3rd	R3		
1951/52	2. divisjon	12	7	3	2	25	17	17	2nd	R2		
1952/53	2. divisjon	12	5	1	6	30	21	11	3rd	R2		
1953/54	2. divisjon	12	5	3	4	20	15	13	3rd	R2		
1954/55	2. divisjon	12	9	0	3	39	18	18	1st	R1		
1955/56	2. divisjon	12	5	3	4	36	24	13	3rd	R2		
1956/57	2. divisjon	12	6	2	4	30	25	14	2nd	R1		
1957/58	2. divisjon	12	8	1	3	43	18	17	1st	R2		
1958/59	2. divisjon	12	6	1	5	36	27	13	3rd	R1		
1959/60	2. divisjon	12	6	2	4	33	22	14	3rd	R2		
1960/61	2. divisjon	12	6	1	5	26	35	13	3rd			
1961/62	2. divisjon	21	11	6	4	52	36	28	↓ 2nd			
1963	3. divisjon	14	6	2	6	32	30	14	6th	DNQ		
1964	3. divisjon	14	5	5	4	41	33	15	3rd	DNQ		
1965	3. divisjon	14	9	1	4	47	31	19	3rd	R1		
1966	3. divisjon	14	6	4	4	44	26	16	4th	DNQ		
1967	3. divisjon	14	7	2	5	43	32	16	3rd	R1		
1968	3. divisjon	14	6	1	7	34	25	13	↓ 5th	R2		
1969	4. divisjon	14							1st	DNQ		
1970	4. divisjon	14							3rd	R1		
1971	4. divisjon	18							3rd	DNQ		
1972	4. divisjon	18							↑ 1st	R1		
1973	3. divisjon	18	3	4	11	20	31	10	↓ 9th	R2		
1974	4. divisjon	18							6th	DNQ		
1975	4. divisjon	18							↑ 1st	DNQ		
1976	3. divisjon	18	5	9	4	19	14	19	5th	R2		
1977	3. divisjon	18	4	8	6	19	23	16	7th	R3		
1978	3. divisjon	18	10	5	3	26	20	25	3rd	DNQ		
1979	3. divisjon	18	7	7	4	29	22	21	3rd	R2		
1980	3. divisjon	22	10	7	5	25	25	27	3rd	R3		
1981	3. divisjon	22	13	6	3	51	17	32	2nd	R1		
1982	3. divisjon	22	15	6	1	62	16	36	↑ 1st	R1		
1983	2. divisjon	22	6	6	10	27	40	18	9th	R2		
1984	2. divisjon	22	9	5	8	29	24	23	6th	R4		
1985	2. divisjon	22	6	4	12	25	41	16	9th	R1		
1986	2. divisjon	22	4	5	13	24	40	13	↓ 11th	R2		
1987*	3. divisjon	22	9	2+2	9	39	36	33	7th	R2		
1988	3. divisjon	22	9	3	10	37	37	30	6th	R3		
1989	3. divisjon	22	12	2	8	48	38	38	5th	R1		
1990	3. divisjon	22	9	6	7	47	37	33	↑ 4th	R2		
1991*	2. divisjon	22	10	1	11	35	48	31	5th	R1		
1992	2. divisjon	22	9	5	8	37	26	32	5th	R1		
1993	2. divisjon	22	3	8	11	29	40	17	↓ 11th	R2		
1994	3. divisjon	22	11	3	8	60	44	36	4th	DNQ		
1995	3. divisjon	22	17	0	5	71	39	51	2nd	DNQ		
1996	3. divisjon	22	16	2	4	76	23	50	↑ 1st	DNQ		
1997	2. divisjon	22	11	6	5	44	26	39	5th	R2		
1998	2. divisjon	22	5	6	11	34	47	21	↓ 11th	R1		
1999	3. divisjon	22	11	4	7	46	30	37	3rd	DNQ		
2000	3. divisjon	22	16	4	2	71	23	52	1st	DNQ		
2001	3. divisjon	22	15	2	5	60	23	47	↑ 1st	DNQ		
2002	2. divisjon	26	9	3	14	47	59	30	11th	R2		
2003	2. divisjon	26	6	8	12	40	59	26	↓ 12th	R2		
2004	3. divisjon	22	14	3	5	55	23	45	3rd	DNQ		
2005	3. divisjon	22	13	2	7	49	27	41	2nd	R1		
2006	3. divisjon	22	6	5	11	41	50	23	10th	DNQ		
2007	3. divisjon	26	10	1	15	51	66	31	11th	DNQ		
2008	3. divisjon	24	19	2	3	101	27	59	2nd	not enter		
2009	3. divisjon	26	21	3	2	112	20	66	1st	QR1		
2010	3. divisjon	26	19	1	6	69	24	58	2nd	R1		
2011	3. divisjon	24	20	2	2	105	16	62	↑ 1st	QR2		
2012	2. divisjon	26	9	5	12	45	53	32	↓ 12th	R2	(Norway) Wilhelm Pepa	18
2013	3. divisjon	24	19	3	2	75	22	60	↑ 1st	QR2	(Norway) Wilhelm Pepa	22
2014	2. divisjon	26	17	6	3	71	29	57	↑ 1st	R2	(Norway) Wilhelm Pepa	24
2015	1. divisjon	30	12	11	7	47	28	47	5th	R2	(Norway) Ohi Omoijuanfo	15
2016	1. divisjon	30	15	8	7	47	34	53	3rd	R2	(Denmark) Tonny Brochmann	9
2017	1. divisjon	30	8	8	14	44	59	32	13th	R4	(Nigeria) Babajide David	8
2018	1. divisjon	30	8	11	11	31	41	35	13th	R2	(Norway) Aram Khalili	8
2019	1. divisjon	30	8	9	13	34	54	33	12th	R2	(Norway) Ole Marius Håbestad	6
2020	1. divisjon	30	9	8	13	41	57	35	11th	Cancelled	(Argentina) Juan Pablo Pereira Sastre	8
2021	1. divisjon	30	15	9	6	49	46	54	↑ 3rd	R2	(Cape Verde) Willis Furtado	10
2022	Eliteserien	30	5	5	20	30	69	20	↓ 16th	R3	(Germany) Felix Schröter	5
2023	1. divisjon	30	8	7	15	40	59	31	↓ 15th	R3	(Portugal) Samuel Pedro	14
2024	2. divisjon	26	14	6	6	46	33	48	2nd	R2	(Liberia) Peter Wilson	18
2025	2. divisjon	26	13	5	8	47	42	44	4th	R2	(Norway) Josias King Furaha	9
2026	2. divisjon	26	18	5	3	60	30	59	↑ 1st	R1	(Norway) Phillip Syvertsen	14

From 1991 Eliteserien has been the highest Norwegian level and 1. divisjon the second highest, followed by third level (2. divisjon) and fourth level (3. divisjon). 1. divisjon was the highest level prior to 1991.

Since 1987 it has been 3 points for a win. In 1987 there was a penalty shoot-out when a game ended in a draw, with the winner getting 2 points and the loser 1 point.

Champions	Runners-up	Promoted	Relegated

- P = Played
- W = Games won
- D = Games drawn
- L = Games lost
- F = Goals for
- A = Goals against
- Pts = Points
- Pos = Final position
- DQ = Disqualified
- QR1 = First Qualifying Round
- QR2 = Second Qualifying Round
- R1 = Round 1
- R2 = Round 2
- R3 = Round 3
- R4 = Round 4
- R5 = Round 5
- R6 = Round 6
- QF = Quarter-finals
- SF = Semi-finals
- RU = Runners-up
- W = Winners

== Current squad ==
As of 2 September 2026

Note: Flags indicate national team as defined under FIFA eligibility rules; some limited exceptions apply. Players may hold more than one non-FIFA nationality.

No.	Pos.	Nation	Player
2	DF	NOR	Storm Arbøll Karlsen
3	DF	SWE	Daniel Hultqvist
4	DF	ESP	Javier Sánchez
5	DF	NOR	Felix Lillehammer
7	FW	NOR	Phillip Syvertsen
8	MF	SWE	Fritiof Hellichius
9	FW	COD	Pascal Simba
10	FW	NOR	Mikal Berg Kvinge
11	FW	GAM	Kebba Badjie
14	DF	NOR	Jo Stålesen
15	DF	FIN	Mikael Almén
16	GK	DEN	Daniel Gadegaard (on loan from Esbjerg fB)
17	MF	NOR	Sander Nordbø
18	MF	NOR	André Rosmer Richstad

No.	Pos.	Nation	Player
19	DF	NOR	Helge Strand
20	DF	NOR	Casper Svendby
22	MF	NOR	Eivind Kolve
23	DF	NOR	Theodor Agelin (on loan from Sandefjord)
25	MF	NOR	Isak Abusdal
26	MF	NOR	Patrik Isaksen
36	FW	NOR	Markus Seim-Monsen
40	FW	NOR	Sindre Osestad
41	DF	NOR	Lennard Kussl
42	FW	NOR	Markus Syvertsen
77	DF	FIN	Samu Alanko
97	FW	NOR	Josias Furaha
99	GK	NOR	Anders Skiftenes

=== Out on loan ===
Note: Flags indicate national team as defined under FIFA eligibility rules; some limited exceptions apply. Players may hold more than one non-FIFA nationality.

No.	Pos.	Nation	Player
10	FW	NOR	Vetle Wenaas (at Arendal until 31 December 2026)

== Technical staff ==
Position	Staff
Head coach	(Norway) Lars Bohinen
Assistant coach	(Norway) Remi Natvik
Assistant coach	(Norway) Thomas Sandstø
Goalkeeping coach	(Norway) Tommy Runar
Physiotherapist	(Poland) Katarzyna Zolnowska
Doctor	(Norway) Bjørn Thomas Kjølsrud
Equipment manager	(Norway) Reidar Berg

Last updated: 28 November 2024
