= Sonja Hauberg =

Danish writer

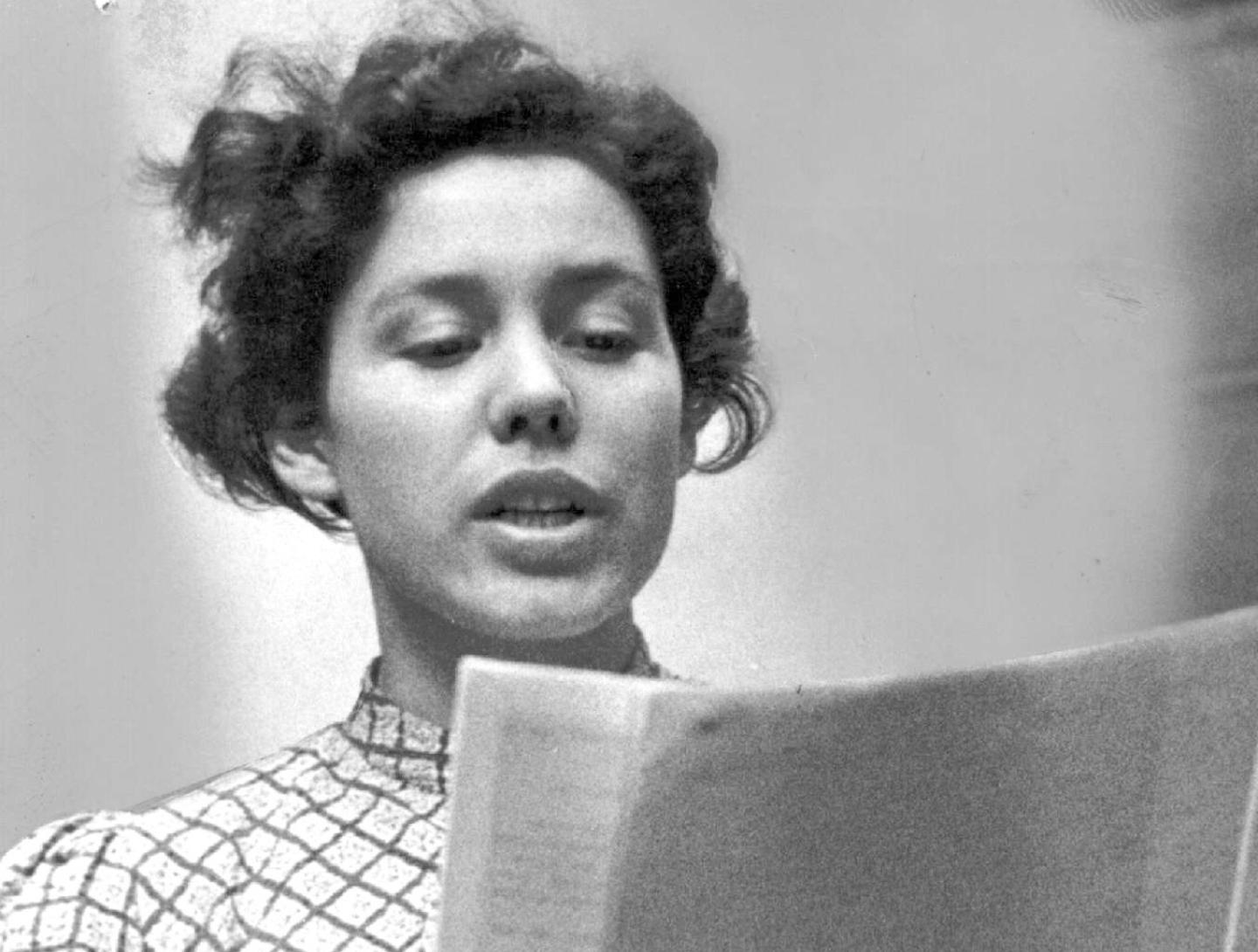
Sonja Hauberg

Sonja Hauberg (1918–1947) was a Danish writer who is remembered mainly as a novelist. After initially writing poems and short stories, she made her promising book debut in 1942 with Hvad vil du mig?. Her most successful work was Syv Aar for Lea (Seven years for Lea, 1944), a puberty novel which was republished several times by 1980 and most recently in 2019. A member of the Danish Communist Party, she died when only 29 after contracting typhus at a writers' convention she had organized in Finland.

== Early life and family ==
Born on 5 March 1918 in the Frederiksberg district of Copenhagen, Sonja Hauberg was the daughter of the architect Harald Hauberg (1883–1956) and his wife Anna née Giersing (1888–1977), sister of the painter Harald Giersing. After matriculating from Ordrup Gymnasium in 1937. she studied Danish literature at the University of Copenhagen. In July 1938, she married the diplomat Vagn Hoffmeyer Hoelgaard. The marriage was dissolved in 1941. In July 1945, she married the painter Richard Mortensen. Together they had a son Finn Hauberg Mortensen (1946) who became a Nordic literature researcher.

== Career ==
While still a student, Hauberg published poems, short stories and sketches in the periodical Vild Hvede and contributed articles to daily newspapers. Together with the poets Tove Ditlevsen, Morten Nielsen and Piet Hein, she was a member of the Unge Kustnernes Klub (Young Artists Club). During the Second World War, she contributed to poetry published by the Danish resistance.

In 1942, she published her first novel Hvad vil du mig? (What do you want of me?), about a female student's mental breakdown. Much more successful was Syv Aar for Lea, vividly based on how the loss of her own childhood led to alienation as she attended secondary school and encountered city life. It traces the life of Ruth, first living with her family in the countryside, then as a student of mathematics in Copenhagen who also travels to Norway. It became even more popular after winning Politiken's Kunstnerpris (Artist Award) in 1945. The book has been republished several times, most recently in 2019.

Hauberg's works all feature a woman who is amorously attracted to two men, a friend and a lover. This is also true of her play Ebbe Skammelsøn which shortly after Denmark's liberation was performed at Frederiksberg Teater in June 1945. Depicting a lost friend killed in the resistance, her last work, the symbolic novel April, was published posthumously in 1961 and has been described as her mærkeligste bog (strangest book). It was published together with a moving postscript in poetic prose which she wrote on her deathbed, ending "Véd I hvor stille et Hjerte er naar det dør" (Do you know how quiet a heart is when it dies).

== Death ==
An active member of the Danish Communist Party, in 1947 she helped to organize a writers' meeting in Finland together with participants from the Nordic countries and the Soviet Union. While away, she contracted typhus. After an extended stay in hospital, she died in Copenhagen on 2 August 1947.

In his Danske Digtere i det 20. århundrede (Danish Poets of the 20th Century, 1980), her son Finn Hauberg Mortensen includes a chapter on her life.
