= Bjørn Nørgaard =

Danish artist

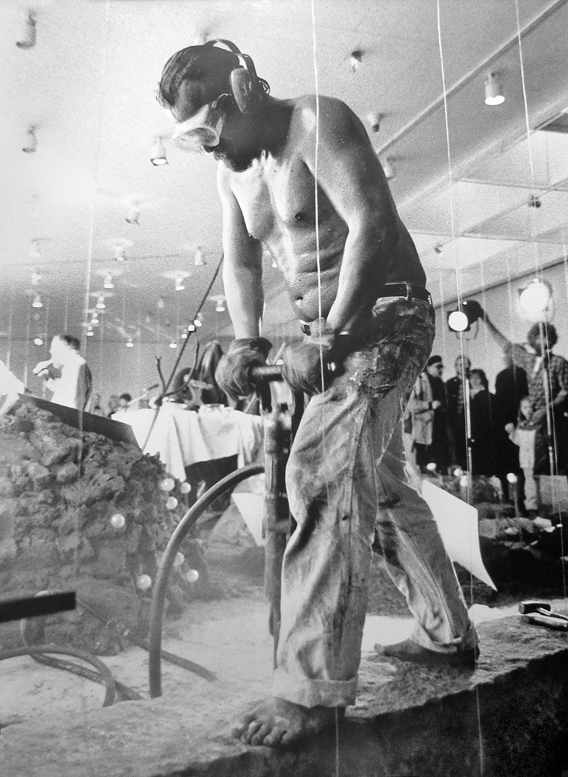
Björn Nörgaard in Malmö Art hall 1988

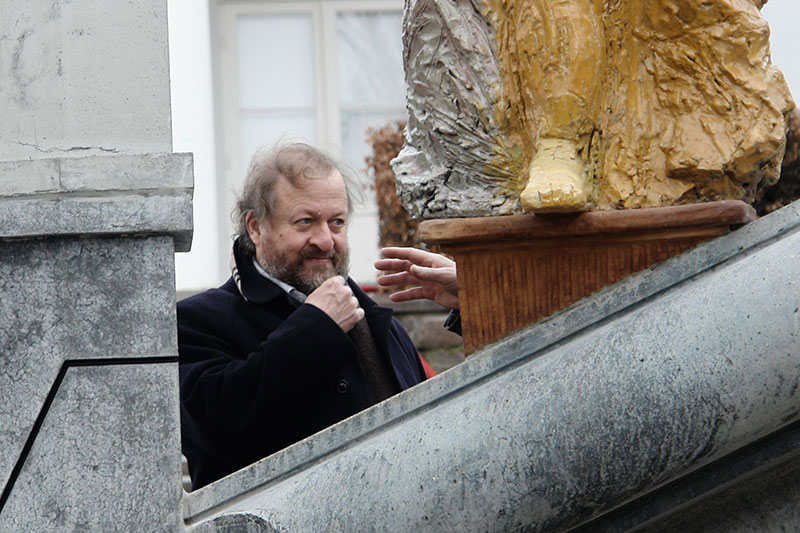
Bjørn Nørgaard by the sculpture "Menneskemuren" (Horsens 2010)

Bjørn Nørgaard (born 21 May 1947 in Copenhagen) is a Danish artist who has been active in a variety of fields. He has significantly influenced the art scene in Denmark both through his "happenings" and his sculptures in Danish cities. Although he has specialized in sculpture since 1970, his greatest achievement is perhaps his work in designing Queen Margrethe II's tapestries. Nørgaard was a professor at the Royal Danish Academy of Fine Arts from 1985 to 1994. His main workshop is in the village of Bissinge on the island of Møn.

== A versatile artist ==
Nørgaard studied in the 1960s at the newly founded Copenhagen School of Experimental Art where, as a 17-year-old, he came into contact with artists such as Per Kirkeby and Richard Winther. Influenced by the German performance artist Joseph Beuys, he was involved in collaborative works and happenings where he found new ways to give artistic expression to the left-wing causes of the time.

One of the most striking of these was "The Female Christ" (1969) when his wife Lene Adler Petersen walked naked with a cross through the Copenhagen Stock Exchange in order to remind society of Christ's visit to the temple. Trading was suspended for the rest of the day. Another was his "Horse Sacrifice" (1970) where he slaughtered a horse on a field in the north of Zealand and carved it up into small pieces which he put into hundreds of jam jars. Here he was successful in encouraging the press to focus on the Vietnam War and hunger in Biafra. The happening caused quite a commotion and debate.

Working with a variety of materials, Nørgaard applies art to communicating with society whether through sculpture, festivals, film, painting, graphic art or architecture. He has succeeded in providing critical reflections on culture, politics and society as it evolves.

Much of his work involves sculpture where he is adept at combining themes from art and culture, providing a new perspective on topics of current interest. His interest in history is certainly one of the reasons why he was chosen in 1990 to design the large-scale sketches for the tapestries tracing the history of Denmark at the request of Queen Margrethe. He was awarded the Ingenio et Arti medal in 1999.

His monumental sculptures located in public spaces in several Danish towns combine concrete, marble, ceramics and glass. They include the widely acclaimed Human Wall (1982), now to be displayed at the Horsens Art Museum, the Hans Tausen monument (2004) in Viborg, and the 26-metre-high (85 ft) Thor's Tower (1986) in Høje Taastrup.

== Key works ==
Nørgaard has been extremely active since the 1970s, producing a wide selection of sculptures and architectural works. Some of the most widely recognized are described below.

=== Gladsaxe Library ===
Nørgaard's first commission, which he received in 1979, was to decorate the recently completed Gladsaxe Library just outside Copenhagen. Aiming to instill interest in disappearing local crafts, he covered the pillars in the main reading room with leather, mirrors, tape and tiles. In the courtyard, he placed a glass pyramid and a tower reaching for the sky as well as two bronze statues modelled on himself and his wife. The facade was covered with numerous cartoon figures and film strips. In the entrance hall, he built a ceramic den which proved a major attraction for children. At the time his work was considered extremely controversial but has now proved the test of time.

=== Human Wall ===
"The Human Wall", created in 1981-82 for the Guggenheim Museum in New York, brings together a series of historically recognisable figures juxtaposed with some more modern ones, including Nørgaard's daughter in jeans, her hands in her pockets. They include the 3,000-year-old snake women from Czechoslovakia, the ape man from India in Uncle Sam's top hat, the Indian elephant woman, the Maya woman, Greek sculptures and a Matisse figure. The work was also exhibited for a number of years in the Danish National Gallery and is now to be moved to the Horsens Art Museum in Jutland.

=== Thor's Tower ===
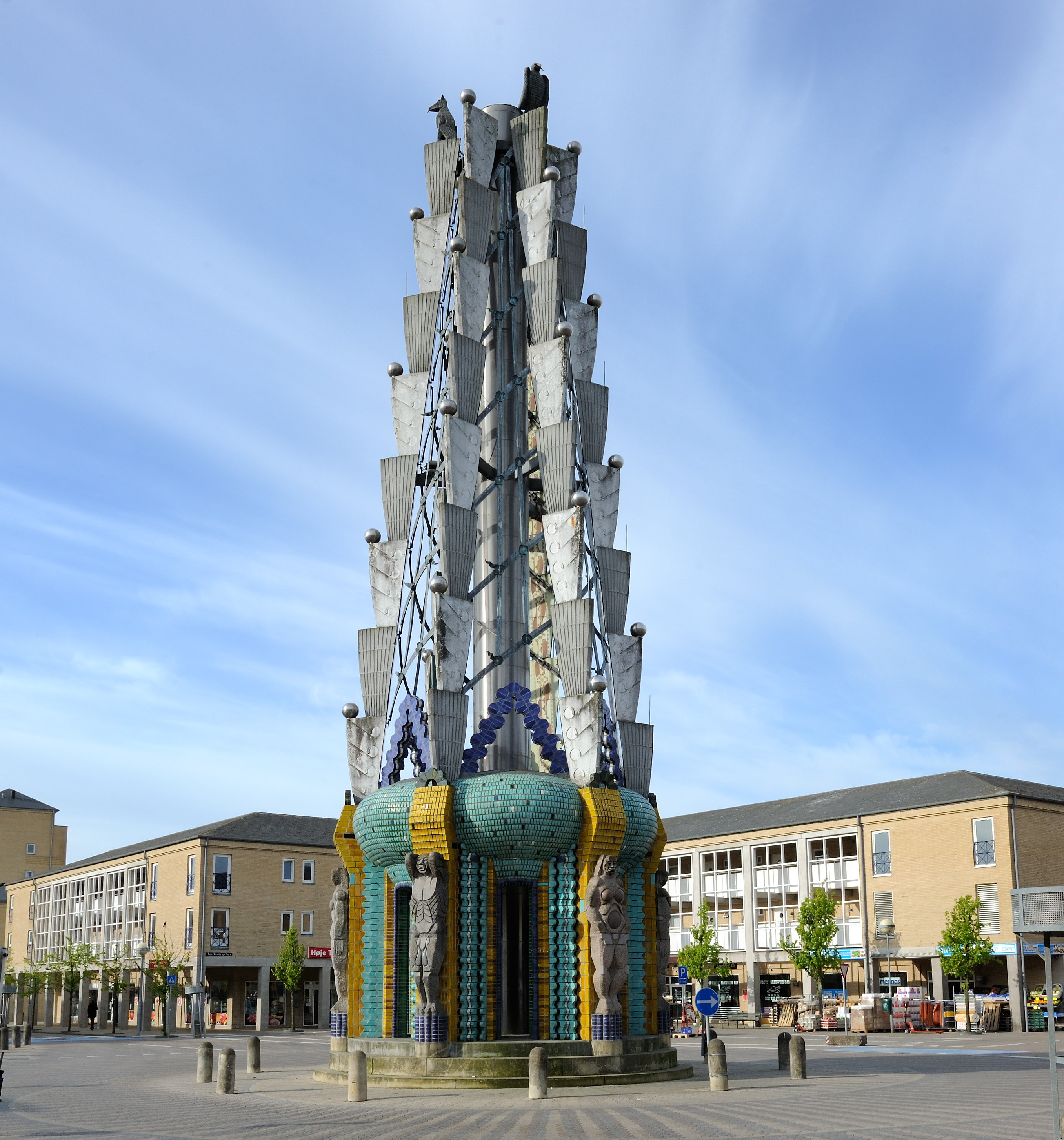
Thor's Tower

Standing 26.5 metres high, "Thor's Tower" (1986), strategically located close to Høje Taastrup railway station, is Scandinavia's tallest sculpture. It consists of many different materials including some 20,000 glazed tiles, granite figures, grey and white concrete facing as well as various metals and coloured glass. The neon tubes encircling the central pillar shine at night. Inspired by Nordic mythology, the sculpture relies on the connection between Taarup's historic relationship with the god Thor.

=== Margrethe II's tapestries ===
On the occasion of her 50th birthday in 1990, Queen Margrethe II decided to use a gift from industry of 13 million Danish crowns to produce a series of tapestries tracing the history of Denmark from the beginnings to the present day. Woven by the historic Manufacture des Gobelins in Paris, the tapestries were based on Nørgaard's full-sized sketches. Completed in 1999, they now hang in the Great Hall at Christiansborg Palace.

=== City Gate, Randers ===
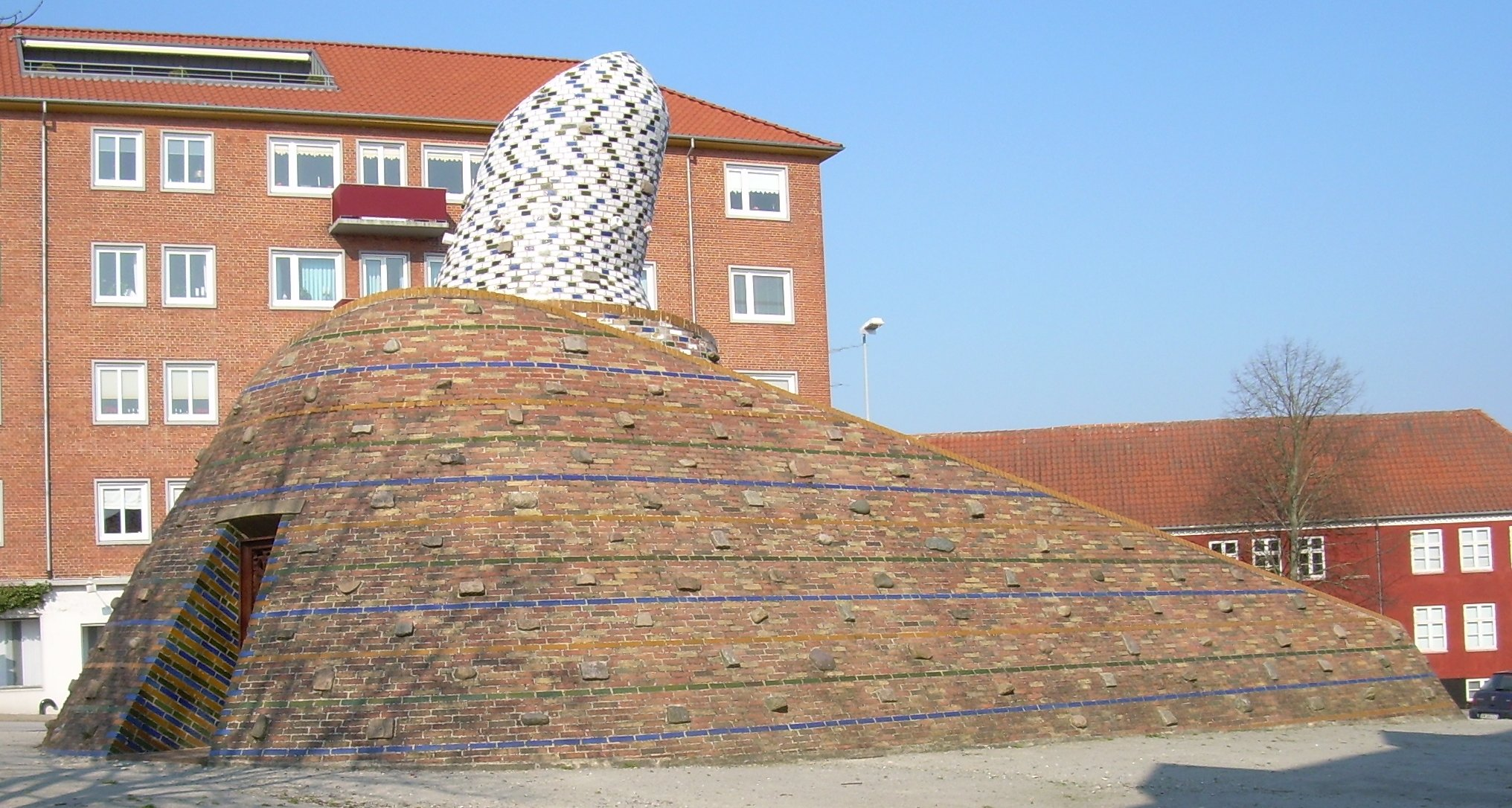
City Gate, Randers

The "City Gate" stands on Adelgade in Randers, Jutland, on the site of a former city gate. Completed in 1994, it is constructed of glazed tiles, cobblestones, cast iron, wood and bronze, combining a variety of colours. It is also known as the Chapel to the Present.

=== Hans Tausen ===
Marking the 475th anniversary of the Reformation in 2004, Nørgaard created the imposing statue of Hans Tausen, its main protagonist. The statue stands in Viborg's Hans Tausen's Remembrance Park in the centre of the city.

=== Burghers of Holstebro ===
"The Burghers of Holstebro" is a monument created by Nørgaard in 2004. Located at a crossing on Nørrebro in the centre of the city of Holstebro in eastern Jutland, the sculpture represents twelve of its citizens, six women and girls and six men and boys. Inspired by Auguste Rodin's sculpture The Burghers of Calais as well as by Christ's disciples, it was modelled on plaster casts of local citizens, bringing a message of hope for the future.

=== Bispebjerg Bakke ===
The recently completed apartment complex (2006) in the Bispebjerg district of northern Copenhagen is Nørgaard's proof that it is possible to combine innovative architecture with good living conditions enhanced by an encouraging environment. The two wave-formed structures snake across the site with hardly a straight line to be seen. Striving to demonstrate that established craftmanship can compete with modern building methods, Nørgaard typically combines the use of various materials: wood and aluminium for the windows, zinc and copper for the roofs, red and yellow bricks for the walls.

== Exhibitions ==
- Statens Museum for Kunst: Venus mirrors mirrors Venus (2005).
- Køge Art Museum: Sketches for Queen Margrethe's tapestries.
- Chemnitz, Germany (2009): Bjørn Nørgaard — Kunstsamlungen Chemnitz.
- Statens Museum for Kunst: Re-modelling the World (2010).

== See also ==
- Art of Denmark
