= Bjarne Rise =

Norwegian painter (1904–1984)

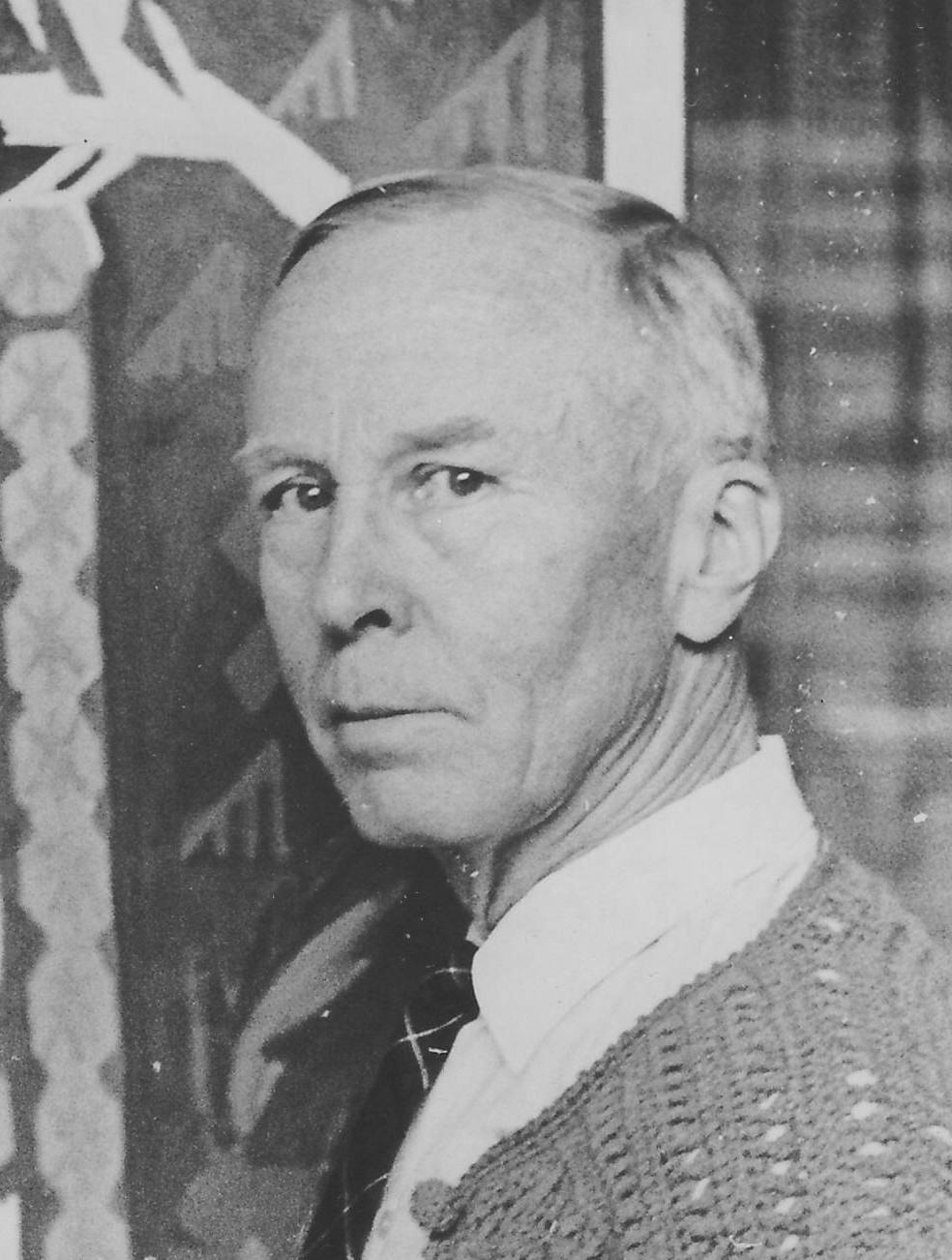
- Bjarne Rise; Photo is owned by Even Rise.
- Born: 18 June 1904; USA Minneapolis, USA
- Died: 30 September 1984 (aged 80); Norway Oslo, Norway
- Education: Statens Kunst- og Håndverkskole; Statens Kunstakademi
- Era: 20th century
- Movement: Surrealism

Bjarne Rise (June 18, 1904 in Minneapolis, United States – September 30, 1984 in Oslo) was a Norwegian painter.

== Biography ==
=== Background ===
Bjarne Rise was born in Minneapolis, United States of Norwegian parents. When he was five years old, the family moved back to his home village of Oppdal Municipality where he had his upbringing. Autumn of 1925, he moved to Oslo where he first went on the Norwegian National Academy of Craft and Art Industry. After that he studied at the Norwegian National Academy of Fine Arts first in 1927 and later, in 1932–1933 with Axel Revold, in 1935–1936 with Georg Jacobsen. He was also a time, after completing the program at the Art Academy, trained by Aksel Jørgensen of Royal Danish Academy of Fine Arts

=== Style ===
The artist Bjarne Rise regarded as Norway's first surrealist. Periodically, he cultivated abstraction one but mostly, his art was figurative in character. Both landscape figure photos and Still life expresses a soft lyrical emotion through a bright palette and a conscious constructive structure which shows the influence of George Jacobsen. He was also influenced by the Danish painter Vilhelm Bjerke Petersen.

=== Works ===
Rise is best known for his altarpieces and three reliefs such as the altarpieces in the Follafoss Church, (1955), Fagerhaug Chapel, (1960) and Ringkollen Chapel, 1981), and murals in Glomfjord church, 1957 ). In addition to painting are wooden reliefs and he worked with tapestries. National Museum of Art, Architecture and Design in Oslo owns a wooden relief and 8 paintings by him. In 1955 he published a book about the artist Jean Heiberg.

== Works (selection) ==
=== Public Buildings (decoration) ===
- "Veronika-cloth," Altarpiece in Gamvik Church (tapestry)
- "Christ and the three apostles" altarpiece Follafoss Church.
- "Five Wise and five bad Virgins" on organ loft and altarpiece in the Namsos Church (painted wooden reliefs and pictorial woven carpets).
- "The Risen Christ," Moss, pictorial woven carpets in hospital.
- Trilogy "With their own hands - Spring, Summer, Autumn", three pictorial woven carpets in "Norske Folk" gården, Oslo.
- "Indian Dream", painting of a house in Rennebu Municipality.
- "The Sower" in Opdal Sparebank (painted wooden reliefs).

=== Cartons for woven carpets ===
- "Indian dream"
- "The Virgin Mary of her three Suitor," after an ancient antependium
- "Golden Bird"
- "Princess, which no one could silence"
- "Get rid of animals"
- "Maternité"

== Exhibitions (selection) ==
- 1928: Represented at the exhibition in the Norwegian Art Association
- 1935: Represented the surrealist painting exhibition in Copenhagen
- 1937: Represented the World Exhibition in Paris
- 1951: Invited participant in the exhibition of visual art along with Paul Klee, Wassily Kandinsky and Pablo Picasso. Rise got good reviews.
- 1952: Participants at the exhibition "Young Norwegian art" in Copenhagen.
- 1955: Attendance at the summer exhibition "13 Painters" in Kunstnernes Hus (Oslo).
- 1957: Participants at an exhibition in Gothenburg
- 1968: Exhibition of drawings together with Håkon Stenstadvold and Ole Mæhle in the Artists' Association.
- 1982: The exhibition "Norwegian Pictorial Woven Carpets" with tapestries of cartons by Bjarne Rise in National Museum of Art, Architecture and Design.
- 1989: Retrospective memorial exhibition in Trondheim Art Association - Trøndelag Art Gallery. The exhibition was shown in Oppdal by Oppdal Art Association same year.
