= Museum Jorn, Silkeborg =

Coordinates: 56°09′38″N 9°33′30″E

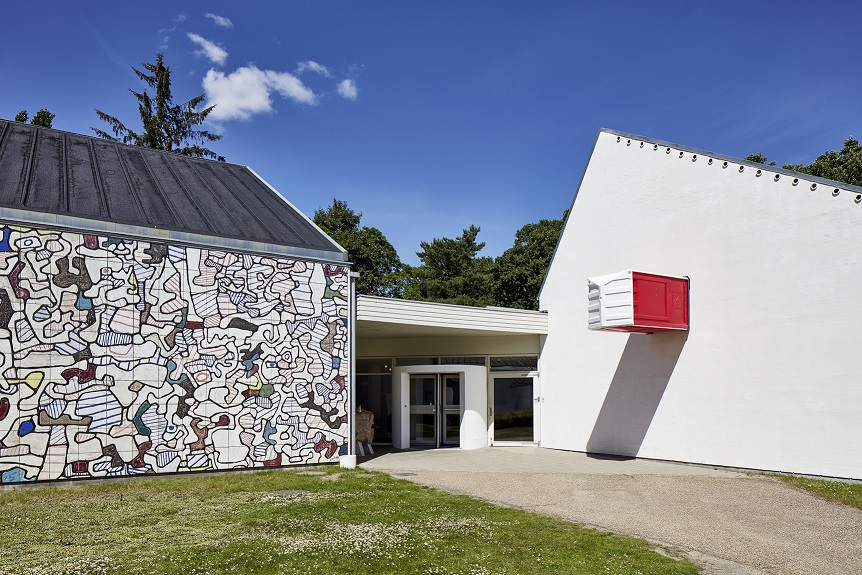
- Museum Jorn - the entrance
- Established: 1965; 61 years ago
- Location: Gudenåvej 7-9; DK-8600 Silkeborg, Denmark
- Type: Art museum
- Visitors: 50.000
- Director: Jacob Thage
- Website: www.museumjorn.dk

Museum Jorn, Silkeborg, (formerly Silkeborg Kunstmuseum) is an art museum by Gudenåen in Silkeborg, Denmark. The museum holds the collections that were developed by Asger Jorn (1914–1973) from the early 1950s until his death in 1973, since when they have doubled in extent.

Consequently, the museum also holds thousands of paintings, sculptures and works on paper by other artists, such as members of the CoBrA avant-garde art movement and older international artists who inspired Jorn or were kindred artistic spirits including, among others, Max Ernst, Francis Picabia, Fernand Léger and Man Ray.

== History and architecture ==
Museum Jorn's history dates back to 1940 when the Silkeborg and Omegn Museum Association made its first acquisitions of art. In 1951, a single room in the local history museum in Silkeborg (Silkeborg Museum) was converted to hold modern art. In 1961 the museum opened an exhibition at the premises of a school building in Silkeborg, and in 1965 the independent institution Silkeborg Museum of Art was founded. In 1973 the museum took over the whole school building, where the museum was housed until 1982.

At the anniversary of Asger Jorn's birthday, on March 3, 1982, Silkeborg Museum of Art moved to a newly built complex of buildings on an 8,000 m^{2} site near the river Gudenåen. The building was designed by the architect Niels Frithiof Truelsen and was inspired by the studio Constantin Brâncuși in front of Centre Pompidou in Paris.

Because of the museum's large international collection, own acquisitions, and artists’ and collectors' donations the premises were inadequate. This resulted in an extension that was inaugurated in 1998. The extension was also designed by Niels Frithiof Truelsen. Thereby, the exhibition area was increased to 3,200 m^{2} along with a daylight free gallery in the basement for exhibition of works on paper.

In 2010 the museum underwent a major renovation and changed its name to Museum Jorn, Silkeborg. A modern Cobra Forum was designed so that visitors now can immerse themselves in the museum's extensive research material on and by Asger Jorn in electronic media and in books.

With the reopening and change of name it is highlighted that the museum will continue to challenge its current role. The many new initiatives are part of the strategy to respond to Jorn's vision for the museum and to promote the artist who is considered to be Denmark's most significant in the 20th century.

== Collections ==
Museum Jorn houses over 30,000 works by more than 600 different artists from around the world including some 100 paintings, and as many ceramic works, graphics and drawings. Two large ceramic walls donated by Jean Dubuffet and Pierre Alechinsky meet the visitors in the museum's courtyard, which also features ceramic blue stones designed by Erik Nyholm.

The museum's own collection comprises works that reach back to around 1900 with work groups of Johannes Holbek, Julius Paulsen, Albert Gottschalk and from the following decades Jens Adolf Jerichau and Aksel Jørgensen. From the second half of the 20th century works of Sonja Ferlov Mancoba, Erik Ortvad, Frank Rubin, Paul Gernes, Per Kirkeby and Richard Winther are shown. The collection also contains works by artists from Eastern Europe. The museum's collection comprises also contemporary works by Georg Baselitz, Andreas Slominski, Poul Gernes and Per Kirkeby.

Inside are works by some of the artists who inspired Jorn: Max Ernst, Francis Picabia, Le Corbusier, Fernand Léger, Man Ray. The Danish art is represented by Ejler Bille, Bjerke Petersen, Carl-Henning Pedersen, Egill Jacobsen, Henry Heerup and Wilhelm Freddie. From Cobra group the following can be mentioned (besides Asger Jorn): Pierre Alechinsky, Karel Appel, Constant Nieuwenhuis, Reinhoud d'Haese, Theo Wolvecamp. And from the 1950s: Enrico Baj, Jean Dubuffet, Pinot Gallizio, Wifredo Lam, Matta, Henri Michaux, Walasse Ting, Pierre Wemaëre and Group SPUR, among others.

== See also ==
- List of single-artist museums

== Other sources ==
- Andersen, Troels (2001) Asger Jorn. Eine Biographie (Verlag der Buchhandlung Walther König) ISBN 9783883754772
