= Ole Schwalbe =

Danish painter

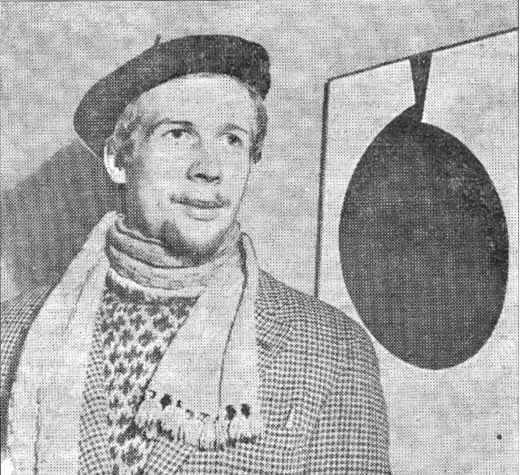
Ole Schwalbe beside one of his paintings (1954)

Ole Albert Christian Schwalbe (23 July 1929 – 15 October 1990) was a Danish painter. He was one of the painters in the Linien artists association who in 1956 initiated the second generation of Danish Constructivism which they called concrete realism.

== Biography ==
Born in the Brønshøj district of Copenhagen, Schwalbe was self-taught as a painter but was trained as a printmaker from 1945 to 1950. He first exhibited at the Kunstnernes Efterårsudstilling (Artists Autumn Exhibition) in 1945 when he was only 16. Schwalbe was one of the Linien painters who in 1956 initiated the second generation of Danish Constructivism which they called concrete realism. After experimenting with colour, in 1953 he decided to limit himself to black and white, forming positive and negative segments of circles like the marks made by a paperclip. In the late 1950s, he added red to the black and white in order to represent the three most important aspects of existence: life and death, body, and soul. Around 1960, his black and white developed into shades of grey as in Signet 1 (1960) but then he began to reintroduce colour with a deep blue in Entre chien et loup (1965).

He believed in total interaction between art and architecture, as in his decoration of Brandbjerg School (1970) when he introduced artistic features which were integrated during the building's construction. Other building decorations included Sukkertoppen Forsamlinghus (1972), the Danish Embassy in London (1977) and Holstebro's library (1981) and town hall (1986). One of his few sculptures is Kuglen in the entrance hall of Holstebro Town Hall.

== Awards ==
In 1966, Schwalbe received the academy's gold medal and, in 1978, the Thorvaldsen Medal.

== Literature ==
- Olesen, Lene; Schwalbe, Ole (1994). Schwalbe. Rhodos. ISBN 978-87-7245-537-2.
- Schwalbe, Ole (1961). Fra kubisme til informel kunst. Borgen.
- Schwalbe, Ole (1972). Se på kunst. Borgen.
