= Sindinggård =

Manor house in Denmark

- Interactive map of the Sindinggård area

General information
- Location: 4490 Jerslev Sjælland, Denmark
- Coordinates: 56°12′30.96″N 8°51′45.36″E
- Construction started: 1730 and later

Sindinggård is a manor house situated next to Sinding Church in Herning Municipality, Denmark. The oldest part of the three-winged main building was constructed for Franz Ranzau in 1730. It was listed in the Danish registry of protected buildings and places in 1939.

== History ==
Sindinggård is first mentioned in 1490 when it was owned by Jens Knudsen Harbou. In the 1750s, Sindinggaard belonged to Mogens Juel and the brothers Hans Dyre and Iver Dyre. The latter's son Claus at blive became the sole owner of the estate in 1655. Sindinggaard remained in the family for several generations.

Margrethe Rodsteen, widow of the last Dyre, married Frantz Rantzau. He constructed a new main building in 1730.Margrethe Rodsteen akso outlived her second husband. In 1743, she sold Sindinggaard to Mads Pedersen Lillelund. In the 1880s, Sindinggaard was acquired by a consortium. Most of the land was subsequently sold off. The three-winged main building's central wing from 1730 was listed in the Danish registry of protected buildings and places in 1939.

== List of owners ==
- (1490) Jens Knudsen Harbou
- (1500- ) Mogens Jensen
- ( -1549) Jens Mogensen
- ( - ) Mogens Mogensen
- (1591-1635) Jens Mogensen
- (1635- ) Birgitte Bille, gift Mogensen
- ( - ) Mogens Juel
- ( -1655) Hans Dyre
- ( - ) Iver Dyre
- (1648-1693) Claus Dyre
- ( - )Jens Dyre
- ( -1707) Palle Dyre
- (1707-1726) Margrethe Rodsteen gift 1) Dyre og 2) Rantzau
- (1726-1738) Frants Rantzau
- (1738-1739) Margrethe Rodsteen gift 1) Dyre og 2) Rantzau
- (1743-1775) Mads Pedersen Lillelund
- (1775-1780) Peder Lillelund
- (1780-1809) Anders Speitzer
- (1809-1815) Enevold Vagaard
- (1815-1859) Søren August Fjelstrup
- (1860-1877) Jacob Boserup
- (1860-1872) Peter Anton Alfred Hage
- (1872-1874) F. V. M. Faber, gift Hage
- (1877-1894) Oskar Olesen
- (1894-1902) Konsortium
- (1902-1911) Johannes Kloppenborg
- (1911-1916) O. Nielsen
- (1916- ) Chr. Frøjk
- ( - ) A. Fausing
- (1920-1921) Chr. Poulsen
- (1921-1923) P. Haugaard
- (1923) Holstebro Bank
- (1923-1933) P. C. Rørsgaard
- (1933- ) Ejner Jensen
- (1951- ) Vagn Christensen
- (1992- ) Jens Pagh Mørup
