= Albert Mertz =

Danish painter

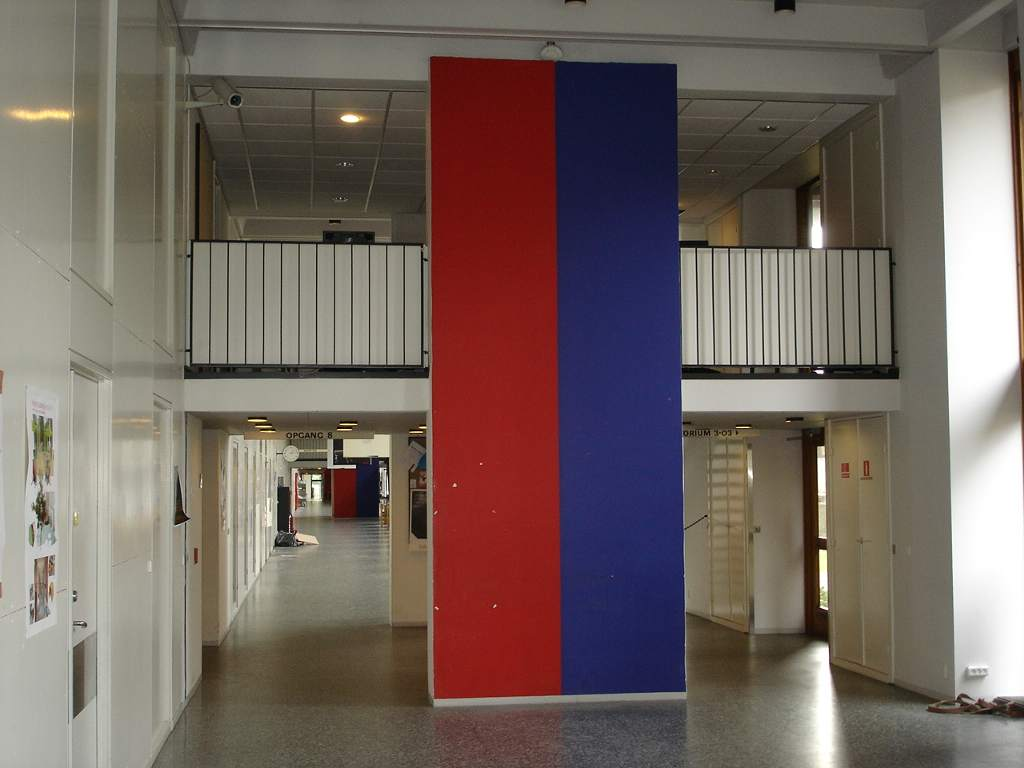
Decorations by Albert Mertz at the University of Copenhagen's Frederiksberg Campus (1972)

Albert Axel Tonndorff Mertz (31 January 1920 – 30 December 1990) was a Danish painter. He was one of the leading artists in the Linien II artists association, working in a Constructivist style in a limited number of strong colours.

== Biography ==
Born in Copenhagen, Mertz was only 16 when he first exhibited at the Artists Autumn Exhibition (Kunstnernes Efterårsudstilling) in 1936. From 1936 to 1938, he studied at the Royal Danish Academy of Fine Arts under Aksel Jørgensen. He experimented with Pointillism and Surrealism before turning to film, creating Denmark's first experimental film Flugten (1942) together with Jørgen Roos. As a result, he was inspired to work with collages and photomontages. In the late 1940s, he became one of the leading artists in Linien II, working in a simplified Constructivist style from 1948 with a limited number of strong colours. In the late 1950s, he associated with the German-born Arthur Köpcke who opened a gallery in Copenhagen which became popular with artists working with Fluxus and Neo-Dada. From 1962 to 1976, Martz lived in France where he painted in his typical reds and blues, while in the 1980s, he created installations with Lone Mertz in Paris and Munich.

== Awards ==
In 1964, Mertz was awarded the Eckersberg Medal and, in 1988, the Thorvaldsen Medal.

== Publication ==
- Cinema, Gent: Imschoot, 1988 ISBN 978-9072191038.

== Literature ==
- Brinch, Jes; Merts, Lone; Andreasen, Søren (2001). Albert Mertz : Arbejder fra et langt liv i kunstens tjeneste; 23. februar - 6. april 2001 (in Danish). Stalke Galleri. ISBN 978-87-90538-13-2.
