= Finn Hauberg Mortensen =

Danish academic

- Born: 26 July 1946
- Died: 21 February 2013 (aged 66)
- Parents: Richard Mortensen (father); Sonja Hauberg (mother)

Finn Hauberg Mortensen (26 July 1946 – 21 February 2013) was a Danish literature researcher and Professor of Nordic Literature at Odense University. He was the son of the artist Richard Mortensen and the author Sonja Hauberg.

From 1970-1974, he taught at the University of Copenhagen; 1991-2007 he stood as professor of Nordic literature at the University of Southern Denmark; and from 2007-2012, he was head of the Department of Nordic Studies and Linguistics at the University of Copenhagen.

Mortensen wrote numerous books and articles, including biographical work of Hans Christian Andersen and Søren Kierkegaard. He was a member of the Arts Council for 2007–2011 and chair of Det Danske Sprog- og Litteraturselskab. He was a member of the Danish Culture Canon selection committee for literature in 2006.

== Publications ==
- Danskfagets didaktik: Litteraturformidling i de gymnasiale uddannelser, en bevidsthedshistorisk undersøgelse (1979)
- Klingen. En antologi (1980, ed.)
- Kierkegaard 1993 - digtning, filosofi, teologi (1993)
- Kierkegaard Made in Japan (1996)
- Bibliografi over Villy Sørensens forfatterskab 1951-2001 (2003)
- Litteratur & symbol - opfattelsen af symbol- og billedsprog i dansk litterær kritik fra Rahbek til Brandes (2009)
