= Daniel Gadegaard =

Danish footballer (born 2001)

Personal information
- Full name: Daniel Gadegaard Andersen
- Date of birth: 31 May 2001 (age 25)
- Place of birth: Stavtrup, Denmark
- Height: 1.94 m (6 ft 4 in)
- Position: Goalkeeper

Team information
- Current team: Jerv (on loan from Esbjerg fB)
- Number: 16

Youth career
- –2014: Stavtrup IF
- 2014–2021: AGF

Senior career*
Years	Team	Apps	(Gls)
2018–2022	AGF	1	(0)
2022–	Esbjerg fB	31	(0)
2026–	→ Jerv (loan)	26	(0)

International career
2017	Denmark U16	4	(0)
2017–2018	Denmark U17	6	(0)
2018–2019	Denmark U18	4	(0)
2019–2020	Denmark U19	5	(0)
- * Club domestic league appearances and goals as of 15 November 2026

Daniel Gadegaard Andersen (born 31 May 2001) is a Danish professional footballer who plays as a goalkeeper for Norwegian Second Division club Jerv, on loan from Esbjerg fB.

== Career ==
=== AGF ===
Gadegaard joined AGF from the local club, Stavtrup IF, at the age of 12 and joined the club's under-13 team. He progressed through the club's youth academy and already at the age of 16, in early 2018, he started training with AGF's Danish Superliga team. On 1 April 2018, he was on the bench for the first time in the Danish Superliga for a game against Hobro IK. In May 2019, he signed his first ever professional contract, signing a deal until June 2022. However, in the following two seasons, Gadegaard primarily played for the under-19s and AGF's reserve team.

In February 2021, Gadegaard once again extended his contract, this time until June 2023. In the following 2021–22 season, Gadegaard became starter Jesper Hansen's backup. He also made his official debut that same season when he started in a Danish Superliga match against Nordsjælland on 21 May 2022, which ended in a 2–2 draw.

=== Esbjerg fB ===
In search of more playing time, it was confirmed on 29 August 2022, that Gadegaard moved to the recently relegated Danish 2nd Division club Esbjerg fB on a deal until June 2025. On 11 September 2022, he made his debut in a match against HIK. Gadegaard also played in the next two games before suffering an injury and sitting on the bench for the rest of the season.

In the 2023–24 season, Gadegaard made seven appearances—two in the Danish Cup and five in the league, featuring in the final five games of the season. He was part of the squad that secured promotion to the Danish 1st Division. Following his strong performances at the end of the season, Gadegaard began the 2024–25 season as Esbjerg's first-choice goalkeeper in the Danish 1st Division and was also assigned the number 1 shirt.

==== Jerv (loan) ====
On 31 March 2026, Gadegaard joined Norwegian Second Division club Jerv on loan until the end of the year. Esbjerg sporting director Sebastian Brydegaard explained that Gadegaard's position at the club had changed, moving from first-choice goalkeeper to a period without sufficient playing time, and described the loan as "a good solution". Jerv manager Arne Sandstø described him as "an exciting option" who would bring competition for the first-choice position, while Gadegaard said the move represented "a fantastic opportunity".

== Career statistics ==
As of match played 15 November 2026

Appearances and goals by club, season and competition
Club	Season	League			Danish Cup		Europe		Other		Total	
Club	Season	Division	Apps	Goals	Apps	Goals	Apps	Goals	Apps	Goals	Apps	Goals
AGF	2021–22	Danish Superliga	1	0	0	0	—		—		1	0
Esbjerg fB	2022–23	Danish 2nd Division	3	0	0	0	—		—		3	0
Esbjerg fB	2023–24	Danish 2nd Division	5	0	2	0	—		—		7	0
Esbjerg fB	2024–25	Danish 1st Division	23	0	0	0	—		—		23	0
Esbjerg fB	Total		31	0	2	0	—		—		33	0
FK Jerv (loan)	2026	Norwegian Second Division	26	0	2	0	—		—		28	0
Career total			58	0	4	0	0	0	0	0	62	0
