= Ernest Mancoba =

South African artist

Ernest (Methuen) Mancoba
- Born: 29 August 1904; Turffontein, Johannesburg, Transvaal Colony
- Died: 25 October 2002 (aged 98); Clamart, France
- Known for: sculpture, painting, drawing
- Movement: CoBrA, Tachisme
- Spouse: Sonja Ferlov Mancoba
- Awards: Egill Jacobsen Award (1989), Lee Krasner Award (1995–97),

Ernest (Methuen) Mancoba (29 August 1904 – 25 October 2002) was an avant-garde artist, born in Transvaal Colony, who spent the majority of his life in Europe. He was probably South Africa's first professional Black modern artist, and exhibited from the late 1920s onward.

== Early life ==
Ernest Methuen Mancoba was born to Florence Bandezwa and Irvine Jonas Mancoba, a miner, in Turffontein, Johannesburg, Transvaal Colony on 29 August 1904. Ernest was the second child of the couple. His older brother died in infancy. Florence and Irvine later had five daughters and one more son. After Ernest's birth, his family moved to Middleburg in Mpumalanga. A white farmer allowed Irvine to farm and ranch on his land. However, after a drought, the family was forced to move. Irvine, upon suggestion from his sister, took his family to Boksburg and found work as storeman at the Comet gold mine. Shangaan miners at the Comet mine gave Ernest the name Ngungunyana, and his acknowledgement of this name can be seen in his signature on his work St Augustine of Canterbury, signed as "N.E. Mancoba."

Mancoba first began attending primary school at an Anglican church in Boksburg. He continued his education at an Anglican school in Benoni when his family moved there in 1915. Mancoba enrolled at Diocesan Teachers' Training College, Grace Dieu, near Pietersburg, renamed Polokwane, for his secondary schooling after suggestion from his maternal uncle, Rev. Alvin Mangqangwana, an Anglican minister. After graduating in 1924, he worked as a language teacher at Grace Dieu until 1929.

== Career and Early Education (Pre-Exile) ==
Mancoba's interest in art began in 1925 with the arrival of Sister Pauline who began a "handicraft workshop" and an adjunct teacher named Ned Paterson to Grace Dieu. Sister Pauline had run such a workshop previously and wanted to start a similar programme at Grace Dieu when she joined the mission in 1924. Paterson, a recent art school graduate preparing for the ministry, visiting between 1925 and 1926, introduced bas relief style to the woodworking workshop and offered design ideas to Sister Pauline's workshop. Mancoba credits Sister Pauline with teaching him how to carve wood and he carved and decorated ecclesiastical objects, often times to others' designs.

In 1929, he tried his hand at freestanding sculpture, and produced a commissioned work called African Madonna using a model in a contrapposto stance. African Madonna is probably the first modern sculpture produced by a Black South African, and is now on permanent display at the Johannesburg Art Gallery.

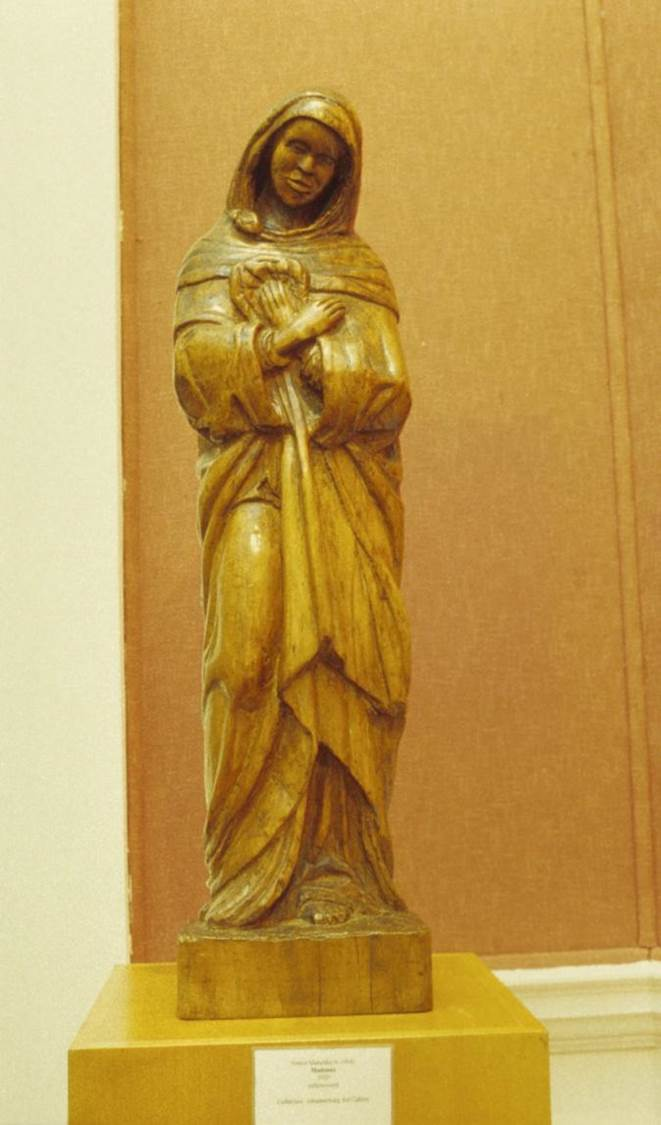
Ernest Mancoba, African Madonna, 1929, sculpted from yellowwood and measuring 86 x 22 x 17 cm.

In 1934, Mancoba sculpted Future Africa (Africa to be) —two youthful African figures as a representational appearance of Africa's bright future. Two years later, Mancoba was offered a job by the South African government's Department of Native Affairs during the spring of 1936 to craft purchasable souvenirs for the Empire Exhibition in Johannesburg later that fall. He initially considered, but eventually refused. Along with other Grace Dieu carvers, Mancoba began exhibiting at the South African Academy annual competitions.

From 1930 to 1936, Mancoba attend the South African Native College at Fort Hare (now University of Fort Hare) on scholarship. He studied history and considered being a journalist. When his funds ran out, he dropped out of Fort Hare and survived by producing religious sculptures on commission, operating out of the Rhodes University Art Department. In 1935 he decided to pursue art full-time and moved to Cape Town, where he associated with a group of Trotskyite artists, including Lippy Lipshitz, who had a strong impact on his emerging sculpture style. Lipshitz suggested Mancoba read 'Primitive Negro Sculptures' (1929) by art dealer Paul Guillaume and art historian Thomas Munro on the arts of Central and Western Africa. It was a book that influenced Mancoba as he moved away from his earlier social-realistic style to explore African plasticity

In 1937, the Anglican Church rehired Mancoba to teach English at a school affiliated with Grace Dieu, Khaiso Secondary School in Pietersburg. The goal was for Mancoba to earn a living while completing received his undergraduate degree from the University of South Africa by correspondence. With encouragement from professors at Rhodes University, Mancoba succeeded. It was during this time that he and Gerard Sekoto became friends, visiting nearby villages. He left South Africa for Europe in 1938 when he received a scholarship to continue his studies in Paris, where he enrolled at the École nationale supérieure des arts décoratifs.

== Career and Introduction to Abstraction (Post-Exile) ==
Once in Europe, Mancoba visited art museums and attending exhibitions showing European modern art as well as the newly opened Musee de l'Homme (now Musée du Quai Branly – Jacques Chirac)) which housed arts of non-Western Europe. He befriended the Danish ceramicist Christian Poulsen who introduced him to the Danish surrealist artists Ejler Bille and Sonja Ferlov Mancoba, with whom he began a romantic relationship.

Under the influence of the array of art, Mancoba continued his artistic experimentation. His first known painting 'Composition' (1940), was made during this period. It figuratively modernizes a Congolese Kuba mask by merging colorful geometrical shapes and sections that reestablish the human form in a profound new configuration created by appropriating figural and design aspects from the African canon. Mancoba’s Composition and other paintings he did in Paris demonstrate his familiarity and ease with contemporary European modernist styles and aesthetics. Many in the field of modern African art recognize and respect his importance as one of, if not the first black African modernist. A quote from (Hassan, Salah, p.g. 19) “This Oguibe illustrates by showing the turning points in Mancoba’s work and by tracing what he understands to be the sensibilities underlying those turns, that is, “from a concern for the mere liturgical within European traditions to an interest in the mechanics and syntax of African sculpture and eventually a personal resolution of the divergent historical trajectories that constitute a colonial or postcolonial modernity, including expatriation and nostalgia.” This, he argues, made Mancoba arrive at a stage of resolution analogous to the emergence of modern individualism in African consciousness”. This quote argues in such Mancoba’s accomplishment lies in his courageous cut off from the expectations and persistence of being a South African artists and truly becoming a free artists; similar to his european contemporaries, wished to explore the limits of artistic expression despite colonial restrictions. His increasing interest in abstraction has been interpreted by Elizabeth Morton as a conscious attempt to negate the paternalistic approach to art he had learned as an Anglican student. As Morton notes, Mancoba was one of the few mission-trained African artists "to have consciously eliminated all traces of his mission style from his work." Mancoba was interviewed about his piece "Faith. 1936. Wood” which was originally posted in “The Star, June 8th 1936” in the popular source "MOMA, Museum for Modern Art". “For a time he was what I can only call passionately absorbed in the primitive art of his people, the carved stools, the figures of fighters, of great tribe-leaders, of women and children. “Look,” he said to me, “they are all serene. Do you know why? My carvings are made to show Africa to the white man. That is why they are sad. These primitive artists were working for the preservation of group-life. The artists, with the chiefs and priests, are the great leaders of the world. In Africa they carved figures strong and beautiful and free because

Despite Germany occupying France during WWII, Mancoba decided to stay in Paris to be with Sonja Ferlov. He was taken as a British subject, and interned in two different POW camp until 1944 when Allied forces, accompanied by U.S. troops, pushed German forces out of France. Whilst in the more benign POW camp La Grande Caserne St Denis, Mancoba and Ferlov were allowed to be married in 1942. They had a son, named Marc known as Wonga (1946–2015), who would also become a respected artist.

After the war ended, in 1947, Mancoba moved with Ferlov to the small town of Kattinge in Roskilde, Denmark. There she introduced Mancoba to Asger Jorn who was a part of the Host Artist's Association and a founding member of Cobra. For the next annual exhibition (1948), Asger Jorn invited Mancoba and Ferlov to attend and meet two other Cobra artists; Constant Nieuwenhuys and Corneille Guillaume Beverloo (most commonly known under his pseudonym Corneille). The exhibition came to be known by art historians to be the first Cobra exhibition since the CobrA manifesto had been written and signed several days before. The Stedelijk Museum in Amsterdam hosted Constant and Corneille's Cobra exhibition called the “Exposition Internationale d’ Art Experimental, in 1949. Constant and Corneille invited seven other Danish Artist, including Mancoba who did not participate. Due to his absence, Mancoba wasn't listed within the exhibition's catalogue and perhaps resulted in his exclusion from the list of Cobra artists. Although no known reason stands for Mancoba and why he didn't participate, personal complications between members may have had an impact on his involvement with the group. Although Mancoba was an active participant with Cobra members and in later artistic movements, his role received little attention in art historical scholarship. Leading artist and scholar Rasheed Araeen to argue in 2004 that the erasure of Mancoba was the result of racism and ethnocentrism.

Mancoba returned to woodcarving during this time, his work inspired by Inuit art as much as by African sculptures. An example is Sculpture(1951). The work is in the collection of Art Institute of Chicago and they describe the work as "seems to reflect both the artist’s early exposure to small Christian icons—such as crosses and rosaries brought by missionaries—and South African devotional sculpture, which reflect a blend of Christian and Indigenous influences. Although critics viewed Mancoba’s “little wooden images” as evidence of his “strong African origins,” for Mancoba it was not geography that mattered, but the shared lineage with artists who could reconcile the spiritual and the material". However, this would be one of the last sculptures he would make. Instead, he turned his attention to works on paper and on canvas. The paintings during this period are colour fields with strong delineation or boundaries between the colours. Parts of the canvas are left unpainted as if the canvas itself forms a colour. Mancoba may have been inspired by seeing frescos in Danish medieval churches

In the 1950s, Mancoba returned to Paris, he would become a French citizen in 1968. An example of work from this time includes Untitled(1957). An oil on canvas painting bearing bold colors and energetic gestures of demanding lines. He sought transparency in his painting process while depicting a freedom of expression through abstraction.

Perhaps the style for which Ernest Mancoba is best known is one composed of line movement often encompassing a central figure-like form that dissolves into the surrounding abstract atmosphere of colorful oils, charcoal, ink or pastel marks. As the Iziko South African National Gallery writes of the work in their collection, Untitled (1965), "the vestigial figure serves as the central scaffolding of the work, establishing its dominantly vertical format. The head has split laterally to become two flag-like wedges. The torso is minimally indicated in the centre of the work and below are the bent legs." Arguably, the figure motif evolved from the 1950s as Mancoba, who had lived through some of the modern world's great traumas, questioned whether humanity had learnt any lessons.

After intense exploration of this motif for more than 30 years, from the late 1980s and until his passing, Mancoba shifted his format to landscape and strayed from one central figure to many calligraphic strokes with various mediums. He died near Paris in 2002, aged 98.

== Exhibitions ==
In the source presented by Södertälje Konsthall, we are given a legacy exhibition of Ernest Mancoba, consisting of conversation between Joanna Sandell, director, Södertälje konsthall and Alicia Knock, curator Centre Pompidou. Ernest Mancoba personifies an artist’s legacy that searches for clarity around the human condition. He does this through his use of movement in form and colour, in drawings, paintings and sculptures. Mancoba is described as a careful and focused artist with a deep relationship towards researching man’s juxtaposition here on earth. Mancoba was not afraid of debating Europe’s one sided relationship to Africa and its artforms, and created his own breakthrough of modernism within art. In the exhibition there is a smaller museum for the works of Ernest Mancoba from the Danish collections of the Ernest Mancoba Sonja Ferlov Estate in Denmark as well as Museum Jorn Silkeborg.

== Sources ==
- “Identity and Abstraction: Ernest Mancoba in London and Paris, 1938- 1940.” Post, 9 May 2018, https://post.moma.org/identity-and-abstraction-ernest-mancoba-in-london-and-paris-1938-1940/.
- Obrist, Hans Ulrich. “An Interview with Ernest Mancoba.” Third Text, vol. 24, no. 3, May 2010, pp. 373–84. Taylor and Francis+NEJM, https://doi.org/10.1080/09528821003799544.
- Obrist, Hans Ulrich. “An Interview with Ernest Mancoba.” Third Text, vol. 24, no. 3, May 2010, pp. 373–84. Taylor and Francis+NEJM, https://doi.org/10.1080/09528821003799544.
- Södertälje Konsthall — Ernest Mancoba . https://www.sodertaljekonsthall.se/en/exhibitions/ernest-mancoba/. Accessed 26 Oct. 2021.<
- Hassan, Salah M. “African Modernism: Beyond Alternative Modernities Discourse.” South Atlantic Quarterly, vol. 109, no. 3, July 2010, pp. 451–73. Silverchair, https://doi.org/10.1215/00382876-2010-001.
