= Vilhelm Bjerke-Petersen =

Danish painter, writer, and art theorist

Vilhelm Bjerke-Petersen (December 24, 1909 – September 13, 1957) was a Danish painter, writer, and art theorist.

== Life ==
Born in Copenhagen, he studied under Axel Revold at the Norwegian National Academy of Fine Arts from 1927 to 1929, and then under Paul Klee and Wassily Kandinsky at Bauhaus Dessau from 1930 to 1931. He was a Surrealist painter, and agitated for the style in several publications. He influenced several painters, including Karen Holtsmark, Bjarne Rise and Johannes Rian. He lived in Sweden from 1944. He died of heart disease at the hospital in Halmstad, Sweden in 1957 at the age of 47.

== Works ==
=== Books ===
- Symboler i abstract kunst (Symbols in Abstract Art), 1933
- Surrealismen (Surrealism), 1934
- Mindernes virksomhed

=== Paintings ===
- Le Monstre dans la femme appartient a la nuit
- L'actrice, 1935
- Kærlighedens vegetative triumf, 1943
- Fille du soleil, 1946
