= Per Kirkeby =

Danish painter and poet (1938–2018)

- Born: 1 September 1938; Copenhagen, Denmark
- Died: 9 May 2018 (aged 79); Copenhagen, Denmark
- Education: University of Copenhagen
- Occupations: Poet, writer, sculptor
- Years active: 1955–2018
- Awards: Prince Eugen Medal (1990); Thorvaldsen Medal (1987); Order of the Danneborg (1997)

Per Kirkeby (1 September 1938 – 9 May 2018) was a Danish painter, poet, film maker and sculptor. His works have been exhibited worldwide and are represented in many important public collections, including the Tate, Metropolitan Museum of Art, Museum of Modern Art, and the Centre Pompidou.

Kirkeby became a member of the Danish Academy in 1982. In 1990 he received the Art Prize of NORD/LB, which is endowed for outstanding efforts in the subject of contemporary art. In 1996 he received the Coutts Contemporary Art Foundation Award and the Henrik Steffens Award. In 1997 he became a Knight of the Order of the Dannebrog and in 2003 he received the Herbert Boeckl Prize for his lifetime of work.

== Career ==
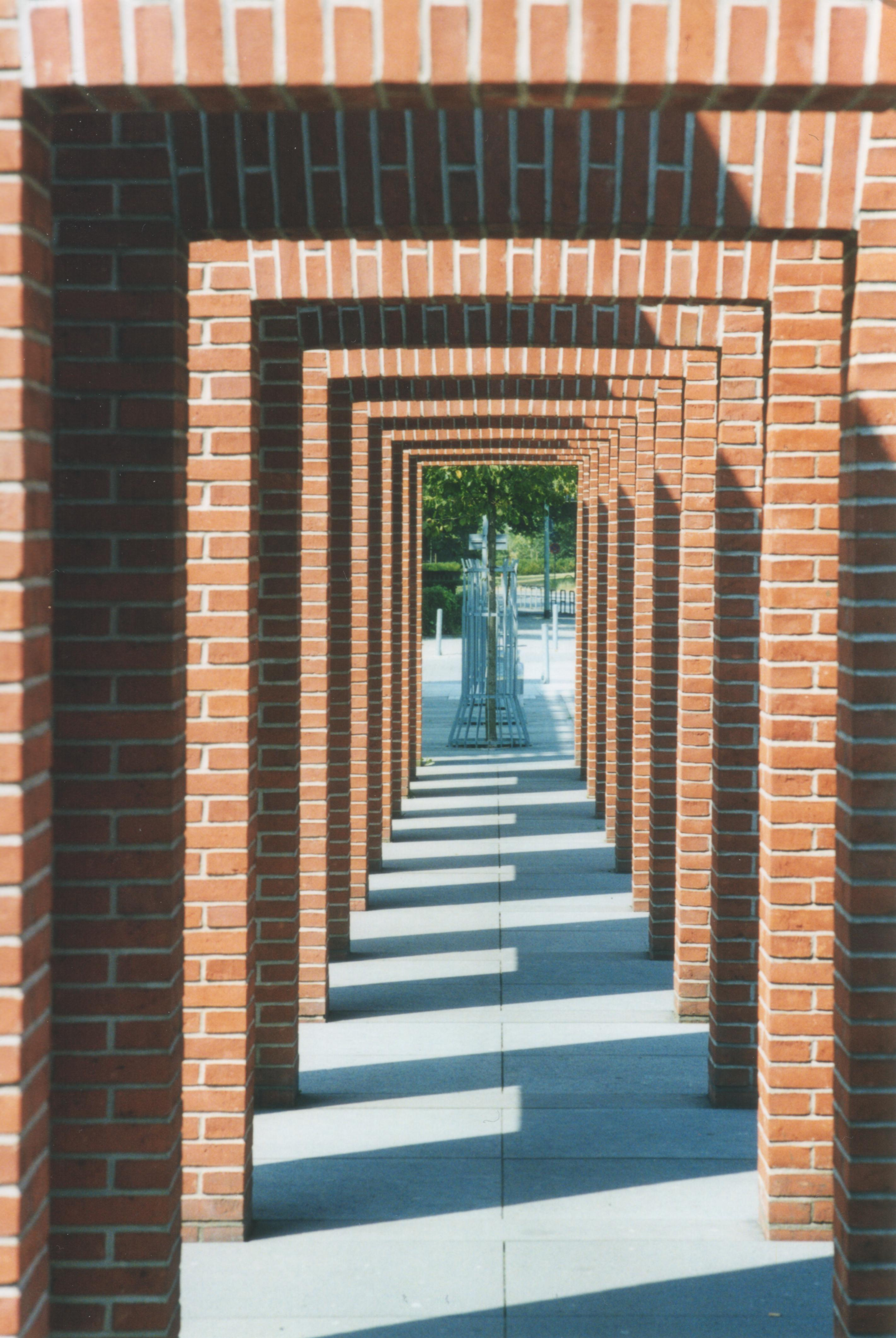
Brick sculpture by Kirkeby in front of German National Library in Frankfurt am Main, Germany

In 1957, Kirkeby began studying natural history at the University of Copenhagen. As a research assistant, he went on several trips to Greenland, in 1958, 1959, and 1960. In 1962, he began studying at the Experimental Art School in Copenhagen (Danish: Den Eksperimenterende Kunstskole). During his time there, worked with a variety of mediums, including: painting, graphic arts, 8 millimeter films and performance pieces.

By the time Kirkeby completed a master's degree in arctic geology at the University of Copenhagen in 1964, he was already part of the important experimental art school "eks-skolen." His interest in geology and other aspects of the natural world was fundamental to and characteristic of his art. Kirkeby went on to work as a painter, sculptor, writer, and printmaker. His works were exhibited at the Venice Biennale in 1976, 1980, 1993, 1997, and 2005. In addition, he worked with theatre productions, designing the set for the New York City Ballet's 1999 production of Swan Lake, and the set and costumes for their 2007 production of Romeo and Juliet.

In 1977, he published Fliegende Blätter. He published a book of essays on the works of Delacroix, Manet, Picasso in 1988. Kirkeby taught as a professor at the Academy of Fine Arts, Karlsruhe beginning in 1978, the Karlsruhe Institute of Technology (1978–1989) and at Städelschule in Frankfurt (1989–2000).

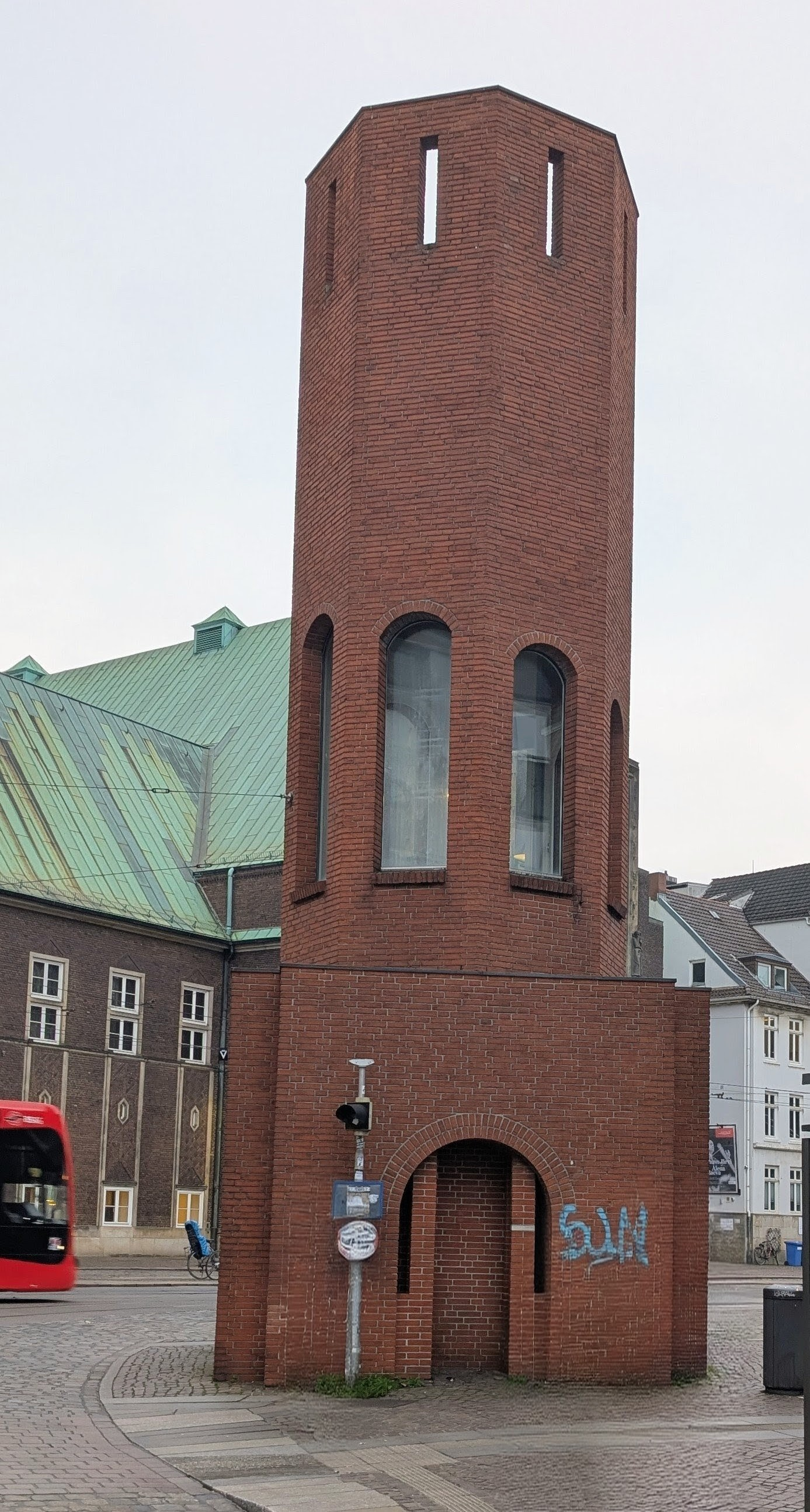
Verkehrs-Turm Domsheide Bremen

In 1996, he collaboratively works as a painter for three films with filmmaker Lars von Trier, creating the chapter headings for Breaking the Waves and Antichrist, as well as the visuals for the ouverture to Dancer in the Dark.

== Personal life ==
Per Kirkeby was born 1 September 1938 in Copenhagen to Alfred Kirkeby Christensen and Lucy Helga Alice Nisbeth Bertelsen. His father Alfred was an engineer and he spent his childhood between Bispebjerg and Husum. In his adult life, Kirkeby lived and worked between Hellerup, Læsø, Frankfurt am Main and Italy. In 1979, he married film producer Vibeke Windeløv. The next year he purchased a house on the island Laeso. Vibeke and Per separated in 2002. In 2005, he married Mari Anne Duus Jørgensen in Grundtvig's Church. Kirkeby had four children: two daughters and two sons.

In 2013, Kirkeby sustained a serious brain injury in a domestic fall accident. He announced in 2015 that he had given up all further attempts to resume painting after the accident, but continued to create small etchings. He died on 9 May 2018 at his home in Hellerup and is buried at Bispebjerg Cemetery.

== List of exhibitions ==
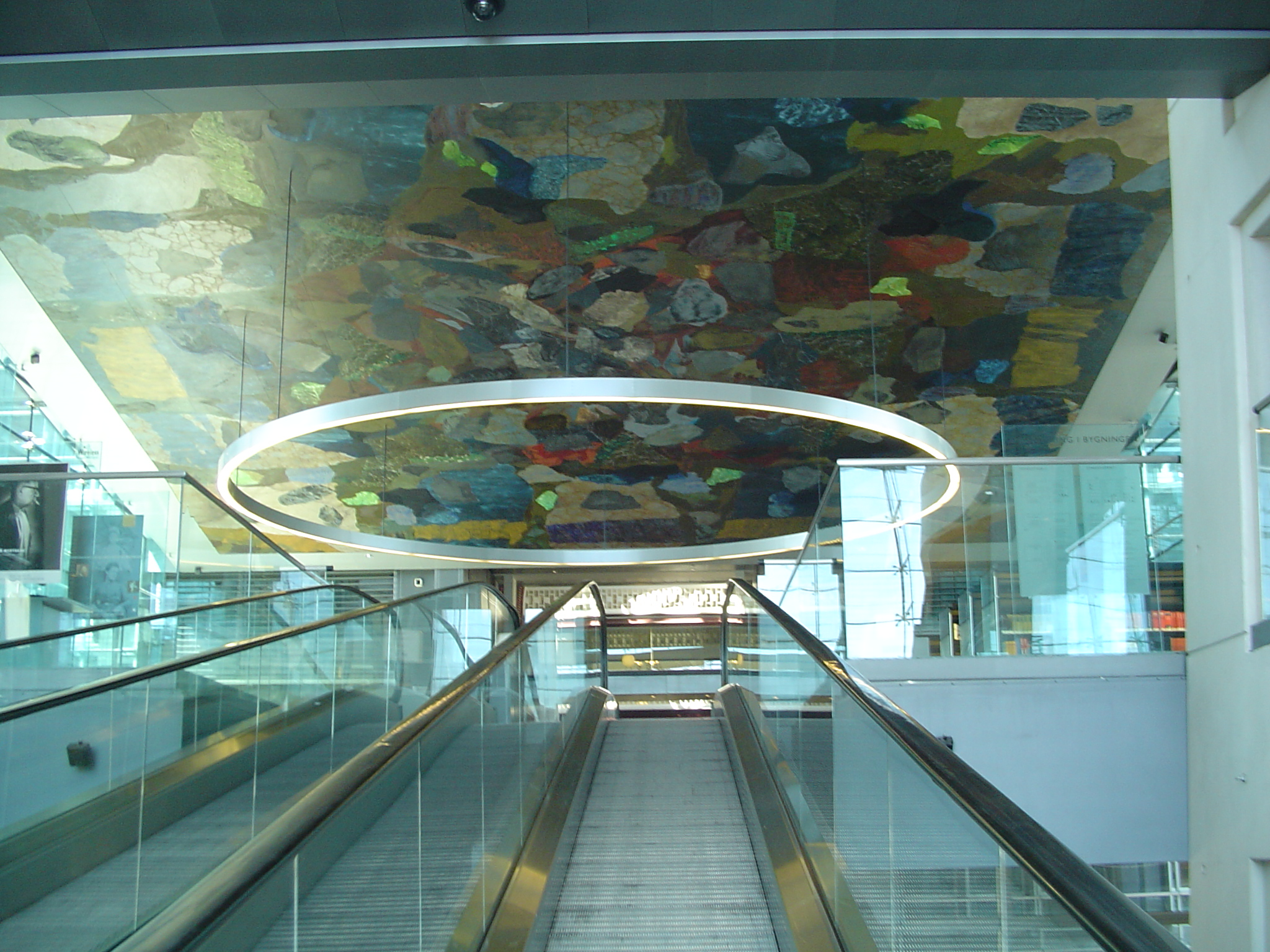
Per Kirkeby's untitled fresco in the Black Diamond in Copenhagen

- "Per Kirkeby", Kunsthalle Krems (2018)
- "Per Kirkeby: Sculptures en brique", Palais des études (2017)
- "Kirkeby på Læsø – om Læsø i Per Kirkebys kunst", Læsø Kunsthal, Østerby, Denmark (2016)
- "Per Kirkeby komplet. Det raderede livsværk", Museum Jorn (2015)
- “Per Kirkeby Paintings and Sculpture”, The Phillips Collection (2012–2013)
- "Per Kirkeby – Samlingen", ARoS Aarhus Kunstmuseum (2012)
- "Per Kirkeby", Tate Modern (2009)
- "Per Kirkeby", Louisiana Museum of Modern Art (2008)
- "Per Kirkeby", Shanghai Zendai Museum of Modern Art (2007)
- "Per Kirkeby", Arts Club of Chicago (2007)
- "Per Kirkeby", National Gallery of Denmark (2006)
- "Per Kirkeby: Prototypes of Nature", Kunsthalle Emden (2006)
- "Per Kirkeby", Kunsthalle zu Kiel (2006)
- "Per Kirkeby / Crystal – Reflections, Connections and References", Aargaouer Kunsthaus (2006)
- "Homage to Chillida", Guggenheim Bilbao (2006)
- "Per Kirkeby: Retrospektive der Zeichnungen", Villa Massimo (2004)
- "Per Kirkeby: Natur und Gestalt. Retrospektive der Zeichnungen und Aquarelle", Sinclair-Haus, Bad Homburg v.d.H. (2003); Städtisches Kunstmuseum Singen, Germany (2004)
- "Per Kirkeby. Monotypes", University Art Gallery, University Massachusetts Dartmouth (2002)
- "DC: Per Kirkeby. 122 x 122 – Gemälde auf Masonit", Museum Ludwig (2002)
- "Per Kirkeby. Die Karlsruher Jahre", Städtische Galerie Karlsruhe, Karlsruhe (2000)
- "Per Kirkeby. Radierungen, Holzschnitte, Monotypien • 1980-2000", Niels Borch Jensen Galerie und Verlag, Berlin (2000)
- "Per Kirkeby", Magasin 3, Stockholm (1999)
- "Per Kirkeby. Schilderijen, sculpturen en modellen in brons/Peintures, Sculptures et modèles en bronze" Centre for Fine Arts, Brussels (1998)
- "Per Kirkeby. Peintures 1992-1996", Maison des Arts Georges Pompidou, Centre d'art contemporain, Cajarc-Lot, France (1996)
- "Per Kirkeby. Pinturas, Esculturas, Grabados y Escritos. Institut Valencià d'Art Modern IVAM, Spain (1989)
- "Retrospektive", Ludwig Museum (1987)
- "Per Kirkeby: Recent Paintings and Sculpture", Whitechapel Gallery (1985)
- "An International Survey of Recent Painting and Sculpture", Museum of Modern Art (1984)
- "Per Kirkeby", Van Abbemuseum (1982)
- Documenta 7 (1982)
- "Per Kirkeby", Kunsthalle Bern (1978)
- "Fliegende Blätter", Museum Folkwang (1977)
