= Paul Gadegaard =

Danish painter and sculptor (1920–1992)

Paul Preben Gadegaard (17 November 1920 – 4 March 1992) was a Danish painter and sculptor. He developed an abstract geometrical style in his painting but is best remembered for decorating factories in Herning, contributing significantly to the development of industrial art in Denmark.

== Biography ==
Born in Frederiksberg, Gadegaard studied painting at the Royal Danish Academy of Fine Arts from 1940 to 1946 under Sigurd Wandel, Kræsten Iversen, Aksel Jørgensen and Vilhelm Lundstrøm. Forced to leave Denmark during the Second World War, he also studied at the Royal Swedish Academy of Arts under Otte Sköld (1944–1945). He completed his studies in Paris under André Lhote.

Gadegaard's early paintings were Naturalistic but from the end of the 1940s became Abstract, influenced by the Constructivist trend he encountered in Paris. In 1949, he joined the Linien II artists association where he exhibited until 1952. After the 1960s, his paintings became lighter in colour, initiating a style which became increasingly common in Denmark over the following years.

In 1952, he began an association with Aage Damgaard who had a shirt factory in Herning. He decorated the factory canteen the following year and from 1957 to 1961, he comprehensively painted the inner walls of the Angli factory, becoming a pioneer of industrial art. His work covered an area of over 2,500 m^{2} (27,000 sq ft), while he added appropriate furniture and appurtenances to complete the decorative effect. He painted the walls and ceilings in bright colours as well as the tables and shelves. While the factory no longer exists, many of Gadegaarde's paintings with their large angular shapes and bright colours can still be seen in the Herning Art Museum. In 1977, Gadegaarde embarked on the decoration of Herning's Angligården which he completed in 1882. Gadegaarde's work is Herning is considered to represent an important development in the recent history of Danish art.

A large collection of Gadegaarde's work can be seen in the Herning Art Museum.

== Awards ==
In 1970, Gadegaard was awarded the Eckersberg Medal and, in 1982, the Thorvaldsen Medal.

== Literature ==
- Sandberg, Jens Henrik (1990). Paul Gadegaard. Herning kunstmuseum. ISBN 978-87-88367-13-3.
