= Richard Mortensen =

Danish painter

Richard Mortensen (23 October 1910 – 6 January 1993) was a Danish painter.

== Biography ==
Richard Strange Mortensen was born in Copenhagen, Denmark. He studied between 1931 and 1932 at the Royal Danish Academy of Art in Copenhagen. Influenced by the works of Wassily Kandinsky, he developed an abstract art style. In Copenhagen, Mortensen was joint founder of the "Linien" school of abstract painters.

In 1937, he undertook a study trip to Paris, where he met pioneers of surrealism, such as Salvador Dalí, Roger Vitrac, Gala Éluard, Michel Leiris, Antonin Artaud, Raymond Queneau and André Masson. During the Second World War, Mortensen's works reflected the violence of Europe. After the death of his wife Sonja Hauberg, in 1947 moved to Paris remaining there until 1964. Together with Robert Jacobsen, Mortensen became connected to the Galerie Denise René in Paris, which became famous for concrete art. His later works are concrete works of art characterised by large, clear, bright colour surfaces. After his return to Denmark in 1964, he received a professorship at the Royal Danish Academy of Art in Copenhagen, which he held until 1980.

Mortensen was awarded the Edvard Munch Prize (1946), the Kandinsky prize (1950), the Prince Eugen Medal (1967) and the Thorvaldsen Medal (1968). In 1945, he married author and poet Sonja Hauberg (1918–1947). They were the parents of literary researcher and professor Finn Hauberg Mortensen (1946–2013). Richard Mortensen died at Ejby in Lejre Municipality.

== See also ==
- Art of Denmark

== Other Sources ==
- Article at Encyclopædia Britannica
- Richard Mortensen : Erindringens år 1958-1993 I-II Ting og tegn / Jan Würtz Frandsen. ISBN 87-21-01561-9
- Richard Mortensen : l'Oeuvre graphique 1942-1993 / af Jan Würtz Frandsen. 1995. ISBN 87-21-00301-7
