= Ole Kielberg =

Danish painter

Ole Beck Kielberg (9 August 1911 – 2 May 1985) was a Danish painter. In the early 1930s, he joined the artists' colony in northwestern Zealand known as the Odsherred Painters. He is remembered above all for his landscapes of the countryside in the north of Zealand

== Biography ==
Ole Kielberg was born at Humlebæk near Hillerød in the north of Zealand, Denmark. He was the son of Ejnar K. (1881–1960) and Amalie Margrethe Betzy Beck Petersen (1884–1972).

From 1929, he studied art under Aksel Jørgensen at the Royal Danish Academy of Fine Arts before continuing his education at the Académie Scandinave Maison Watteau in Paris (1933–34) under Othon Friesz, Marcel Gromaire and Charles Despiau.

In 1930, he made his debut at the Den Frie Udstilling in Copenhagen. In 1938 he moved to Dageløkke near Humlebæk. During the 1930s, Kielberg spent several periods in Odsherred where he created landscapes from Høve to Vejrhøj in addition to a sketch of his friend Karl Bovin wearing a rucksack.

His early portraits and landscapes were characterized by Aksel Jørgensen's tight composition while his works from Paris were less rigid and more freely coloured. His Danish landscapes reveal his friendship with the Odsherred Painters, especially Karl Bovin, Søren Hjorth Nielsen, Victor Brockdorff, Viggo Lørup and Ellen Krause, most of whom were also members of Corner.

Kielberg is remembered first and foremost for the landscapes in all seasons and weathers he painted around Daugløkke near Humlebæk where he lived from 1938. In the 1950s, his approach benefited from the light and colour he experienced in Rome and Florence. A small proportion of his work also covered figure painting and portraits while he also copied the works of the classical masters he discovered in his trips to the museums of Europe. Later in life, he concentrated on painting garden flowers.

== Awards ==
He received the Oluf Hartmann scholarship (1949), Jeanne and Henri Nathansen memorial grant (1961), Kristian Zahrtman scholarship (1966) and Slott-Møller scholarship (1978). Kielberg received the Eckersberg Medal in 1959 and the Thorvaldsen Medal in 1929.
