= Viggo Rørup =

Danish artist

Viggo Julius Rørup (12 September 1903 – 14 January 1971) was a Danish artist who in the early 1930s joined the artists' colony in northwestern Zealand known as the Odsherred Painters.

== Biography ==
Born in Kalundborg, Rørup studied at the Royal Danish Academy of Fine Arts under Ejnar Nielsen and Sigurd Wandel, graduating in 1930. He debuted in 1928 at the Kunstnernes Efterårsudstilling (Artists' Autumn Exhibition). In 1927, he moved into a house in Kårup Bakker in Odsherred as one of the first to join Karl Bovin and Kaj Ejstrup in the group of artists known as the Odsherred Painters.

In 1937, he married the artist Ellen Krause who also became a member of the artists' colony. Until 1940, he was mainly a figure painter but he then extended his scope to landscapes. His early paintings are rather dark but after spending some time in France studying the works of the Impressionists, his palette became brighter and his colours more intense, forming a webbing of light and shade. He increasingly developed an Impressionistic style approaching Pointillism. From 1942, he was a member of the Corner artists association, where he also exhibited. He travelled widely in the 1950s, producing many drawings and sketches in various European countries. In 1950, together with his wife, Rørup bought a dilapidated homestead in Åsen near Ordrup in Odsherred where he spent the rest of his life.

Rørup's paintings have been exhibited across Denmark and in Rostock, Stockholm and Ukraine. In 2014, his Rødvinsselskabet (Red Wine Party, 1967) was one of the highlights of the Hverdagen er en fest (Every Day is a Party) exhibition at Odherreds Museum.

== Literature ==
- Flugt, Tommy (2011). "Tidsskrift for Kunst 2011 #2: Tidsskrift om Odsherreds Kunstmuseum, Malergården og Huset i Asnæs" (in Danish). Aurora.
