= Alfred Simonsen =

Danish painter

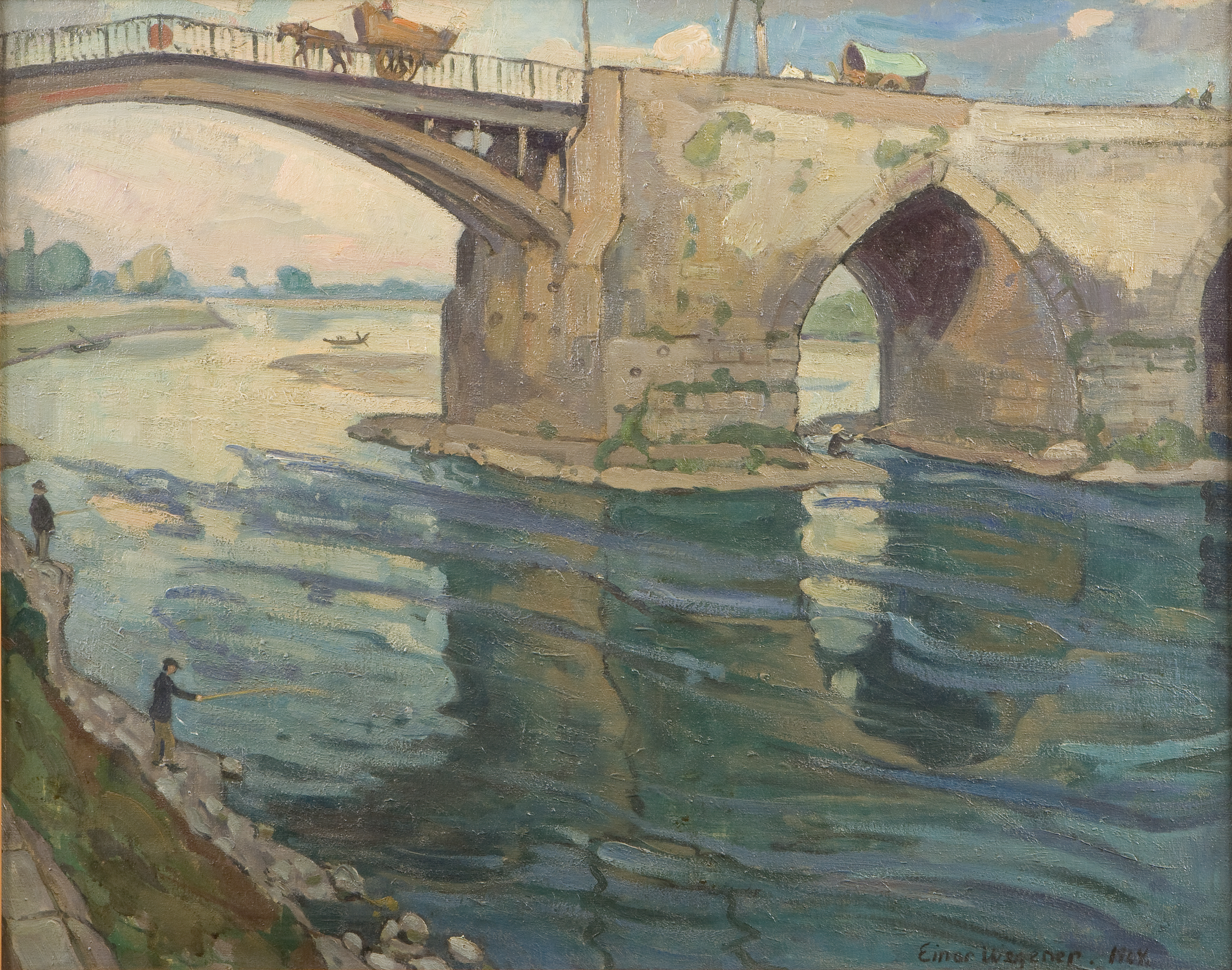
Alfred Simonsen: Martslandskab (1934)

Alfred Simonsen (16 December 1906 – 12 April 1935) was a Danish painter who in the early 1930s became associated with the artists' colony in northwestern Zealand known as the Odsherred Painters. When he died at the early age of 27, he had only completed about 30 paintings and a few sketches.

== Biography ==
The son of a gardener, Simonsen was born in Kølstrup, a little village near Kerteminde on the Danish island of Funen. He was given painting lessons by an Odense theatre painter from about 1920. From 1926 to 1932, he studied painting at the Royal Danish Academy of Fine Arts under Ejnar Nielsen and Aksel Jørgensen. While there, he developed a friendship with Erik Raadal and Karl Bovin. His association with Ernst Syberg also brought him into contact with the Funen Painters, encouraging to paint scenes of the Funen countryside, especially around Korup and Svanninge. His paintings also show strong resemblances with those of the Odsherred Painters, especially the dark colouring and the elevated horizon. His later works are rather brighter with bolder colour combinations. Simonsen died when very young, leaving only about 30 paintings and a few sketches.
