= Johannes Carstensen =

Danish painter (1924–2010)

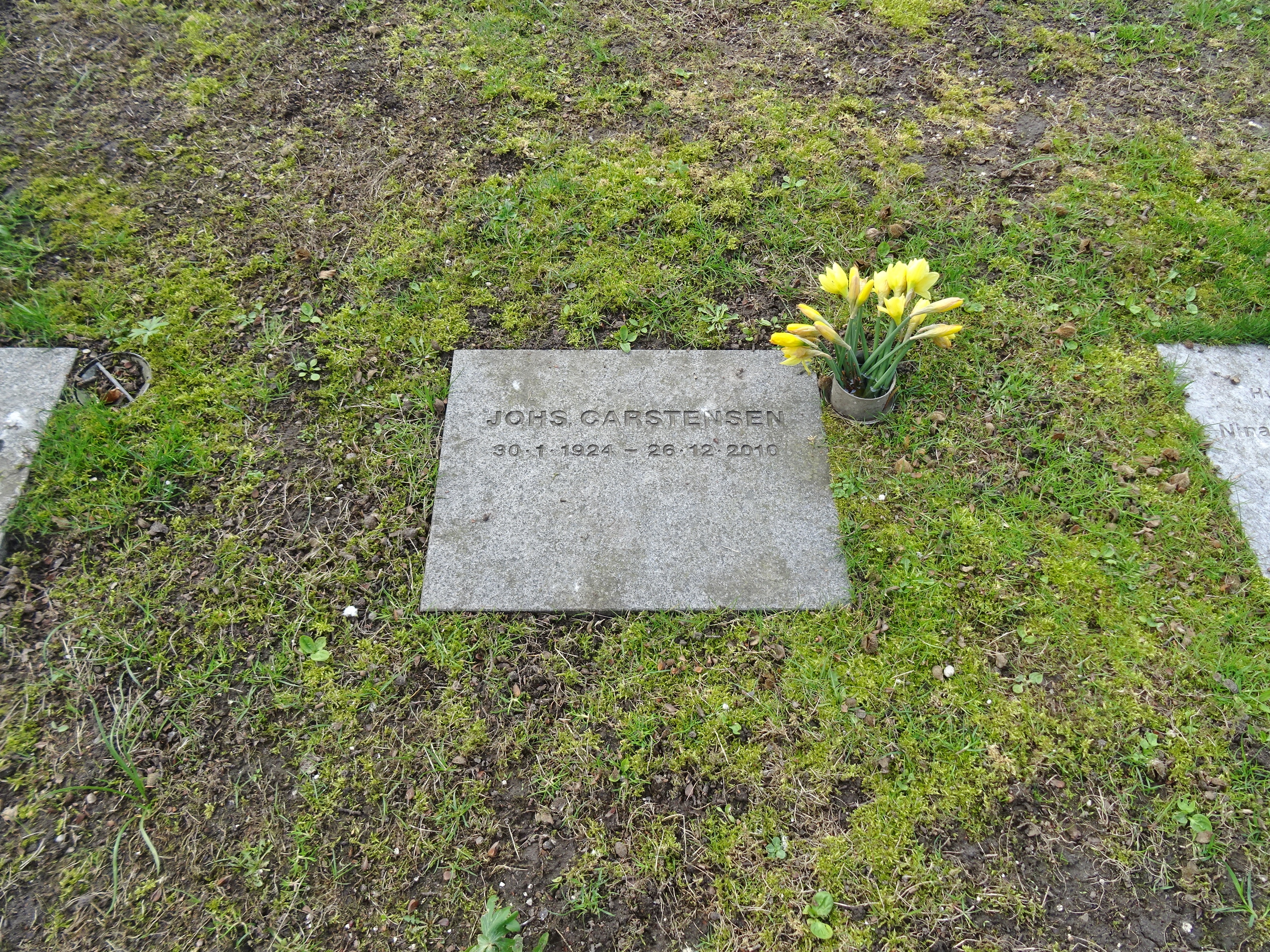
Grave of Johannes Carstensen in Copenhagen.

Johannes Carstensen (30 January 1924 — 26 December 2010) was a Danish painter. His stay in France in the 1950s encouraged him to adopt a Neo-impressionistic approach to his painting. In the 1960s, he moved to Odsherred where he became associated with the Odsherred Painters.

== Biography ==
Born in Sønderborg in the south of Jutland, Hansen attended the Technical School in Odense before studying painting under Aksel Jørgensen at the Royal Danish Academy of Fine Arts from 1950 to 1954. He travelled to Italy on a study trip in 1951 and went to France, Spain and North Africa in 1953.

His work in the 1950s was inspired by Jørgensen and Erik Hoppe, leading to dark earthy tones though his landscapes tended towards shades of red and orange. During his trip to France, he became particularly interested in the works of Georges Braque and van Gogh, inducing him to develop a Neo-impressionist approach to his work. In the 1960s, he moved to Odsherred where he associated with Karl Bovin and the Odsherred Painters. His landscapes became brighter while he began to adopt a pointillist style.

Many of his works contain motifs such as clowns, skulls, masks and boats, all covered in a naturalistic mode, sometimes approaching a non-figurative style. Carstensen has also worked with stained glass mosaics (for example in the theatre in Sønderborg) as well as an illustrator.

Carstensen became a member of Grønningen in 1958, Corner in 1970 and Koloristerne in 1992.

== Awards ==
Carstensen received the Eckersberg Medal in 1972.
