= Povl Christensen =

Danish painter and illustrator (1909–1977)

Povl Christensen (2 June 1909 – 9 July 1977) was a Danish painter and illustrator who, in the early 1930s, joined the artists' colony in northwestern Zealand known as the Odsherred Painters. He is however primarily remembered as a highly proficient graphic artist, not only for his woodcuts and engravings but for his contributions to overall book design.

== Early life ==
Born in Copenhagen, Christensen was the son of a wholesaler. After attending Copenhagen's Technical School, he entered the Royal Danish Academy of Fine Arts, first studying painting under Ejnar Nielsen and Aksel Jørgensen (1926–28) and then graphic arts, also under Jørgensen (1930–38), including woodcuts, etching and lithography. While at the academy, he demonstrated expertise in both figure painting and landscapes. He continued to practice painting although in 1933, at the age of just 24, he created his first published illustrations producing excellent woodcuts for Steen Steensen Blicher's Brudstykker af en Landsbydegns Dagbog (Diary of a Parish Clerk).

== Illustrations ==
His illustrations for the works of classical Danish authors including Hans Christian Andersen, Hans Adolph Brorson and Thomas Kingo combine technical proficiency with artistic talent. He also provided illustrations for the works of many foreign authors including William Shakespeare, Johann Wolfgang Goethe, Nikolay Gogol and Edgar Allan Poe. He produced original illustrations for some 60 books as well as a similar number of reproductions, not to mention a considerable number of individual sheets, often in large formats. When working with books, he took great care in designing the overall presentation of the work including titles, fonts, column sizes, paper quality and layout. In his own words: "The book is and must remain an insoluble whole and if there are illustrations they should be seen as something in support of the work. And those of us who produce these illustrations must understand that we are providing a service for something that is much greater than we are; we need to feel admiration and respect for the text."

Some of Christensen's finest graphical works were created in Bergen where he taught at the art school from 1955 to 1957. Not only were they considerably larger but they exhibited new inspiration, more sensitivity and improved technique. He was one of the few 20th-century graphical artists from Denmark who developed copper engraving as a logical extension of his woodcuts.

== Paintings ==
Christensen's paintings from his younger days stem in part from his association with the Odsherred Painters where he painted landscapes in oils. Later he turned to watercolours and pastels and later still to strongly coloured collages. He first exhibited at Kunstnernes Efterårsudstilling (Artists' Autumn Exhibition) in 1929, followed by many submissions over the years to Charlottenborg as well as to Corner, Koloristerne and Den Frie Udstilling.

== Awards ==
Christensen was awarded the Eckersberg Medal in 1954 and the Thorvaldsen Medal in 1968.

== Literature ==
- Andersen, H. C. (1969). H.C. Andersen illustreret af Povl Christensen. ... (in Danish).
- Christensen, Povl (1960). Povl Christensen; bogillustrattioner: book-illustrations (in Danish). Hans Reitzel.
- Flugt, Tommy (2011). "Tidsskrift for Kunst 2011 #2: Tidsskrift om Odsherreds Kunstmuseum, Malergården og Huset i Asnæs" (in Danish). Aurora.
