= Lauritz Hartz =

Danish artist

Lauritz Berg Hartz (27 December 1903 – 22 September 1987) was a Danish artist, considered to be one of the country's finest colourists.

== Biography ==
Born in Frederiksberg, Hartz was first instructed in art at the age of 19 by the German Expressionist painter, Fritz Urschbach who aroused his interest in naturalism. He studied at the Royal Danish Academy of Fine Arts in Copenhagen under Sigurd Wandel and Aksel Jørgensen where he quickly gained a reputation as a talented artist.

Suffering from schizophrenia, his health deteriorated from about 1935, requiring him to be hospitalised more and more frequently. Yet even after permanent hospitalisation in Nykøbing Sjælland in 1942, he continued to paint, participating in the exhibitions of the Corner group of which he had been a founding member. Many of his works depict scenes from Odsherred in the northwest of Zealand. He is considered to be a member of the group of artists known as the Odsherred Painters, especially as he joined them in forming Corner.

Hartz' earlier portraits, landscapes and still lifes were characterised by thick layers of paint. With time, the human form disappeared as his style became more sketchy. The once vivid colours were increasingly thinned down. Ultimately he reverted just to drawings and watercolours.

Hertz died on 22 September 1987 in Nykøbing Sjælland.

The Holstebro Museum of Art in north-west Jutland holds the largest collection of Lauritz Hartz’ works with over 3,000 of his drawings and paintings.

== Awards ==
Hartz was awarded the Eckersberg Medal in 1940 and the Thorvaldsen Medal in 1967.

== Literature ==
- Heltoft, Kjeld; Hartz, Lauritz (1992). Lauritz Hartz. Christian Ejler. ISBN 978-87-7241-710-3.
