= Ellen Krause =

Danish artist

Ellen Margrethe Krause Rørup (29 December 1905 — 11 September 1990) was a Danish artist who, after marrying Viggo Rørup in 1937, became a member of the artists' colony in northwestern Zealand known as the Odsherred Painters.

== Biography ==
Born in Fredericia, Krause was the daughter of a railway official. She studied at the Royal Danish Academy of Fine Arts under Kræsten Iversen and Ejnar Nielsen, graduating in 1933, the year when she first exhibited at the Kunstnernes Efterårsudstilling (Artists' autumn exhibition). In 1937, she married Viggo Rørup and settled with him in Odsherred for the rest of her life.

== Paintings ==
Krause is remembered for her touching portraits of children but she also painted still-lifes of flowers and fruit as well as landscapes. The garden in Odsherred, the surrounding fields and scenes of everyday life at home with her husband and child were common motifs. After her husband's death in 1970, she travelled frequently, especially to France, where she painted the places and people she encountered. In addition, she painted scenes in restaurants and bars, and also in railway stations, including the Central Station in Copenhagen where people are rushing about or waiting for trains.

He earlier paintings exhibit dull, rather earthy tones but she went on to employ stronger colouring, especially blues and greens, ultimately adopting a much lighter approach with delicate shades of red and purple. From broad brush-strokes, she moved to much looser, more sketchy techniques.

== Exhibitions ==
Krause's works were widely exhibited in Denmark during her lifetime. In 1966, she joined Corner, founded by her husband and his friends in the 1930s, frequently exhibiting there. In 2013, Odsherreds Kunstmuseum arranged a major exhibition of her works.

== Literature ==
- Flugt, Tommy (2011). "Tidsskrift for Kunst 2011 #2: Tidsskrift om Odsherreds Kunstmuseum, Malergården og Huset i Asnæs" (in Danish). Aurora.
