= Erik Raadal =

Danish painter

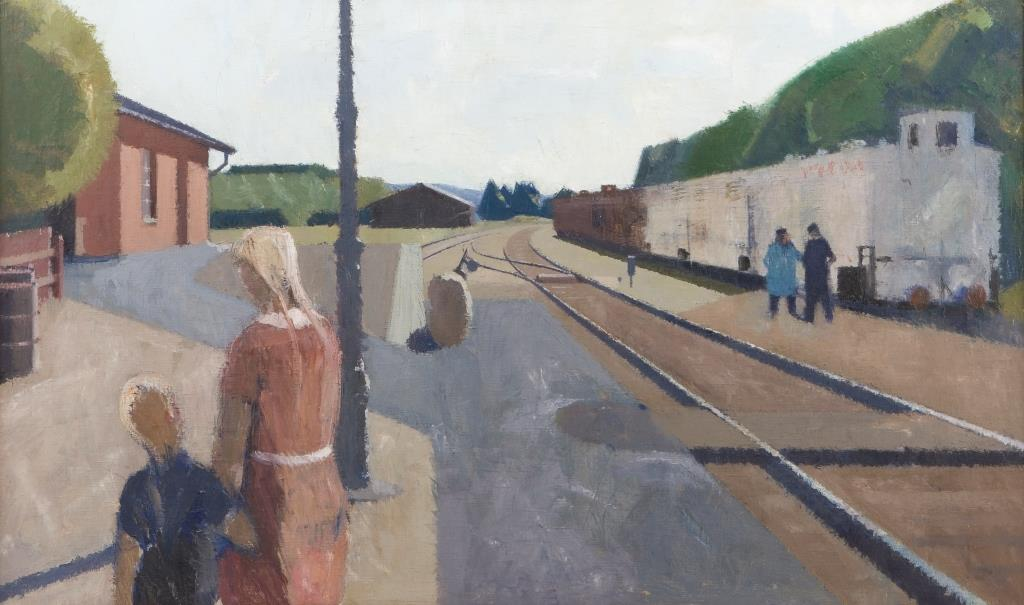
Erik Raadal: Firetoget (1937)

Erik Kristoffer Raadal (18 June 1905 – 13 January 1941) was a Danish painter. During his short life, Raadal became one of Denmark's most important landscape painters of the 1930s, often painting scenes around Gjern, his home town in central Jutland.

== Biography ==
Born in the little village of Horn near Silkeborg in central Jutland, Raadal studied painting at the Royal Danish Academy of Fine Arts under Ejnar Nielsen and Sigurd Wandel (1927–31). His landscapes of the quiet station town of Gjern were initially quite dark but by the mid-1930s, he had begun to employ lighter tones. They often include figures, usually seen from behind, emphasizing the depths of the scene beyond. His strict composition and his town scenes were considered leading examples of how to depict space and depth of field in urban landscapes. His work was part of the painting event in the art competition at the 1932 Summer Olympics.

Raadal exhibited in Charlottenborg from 1929 as well as at Kunstnernes Efterårsudstilling until 1934 but it was at Corner that he exhibited most frequently. Raadal died in Silkeborg when he was only 35.

== Literature ==
- Falcon Møller, Dorthe (1987). Erik Raadal: maleren fra Gjern. Foreningen for Dansk Kunst. ISBN 978-87-88802-01-6.
