= Fredericia =

Town in Denmark

- Town
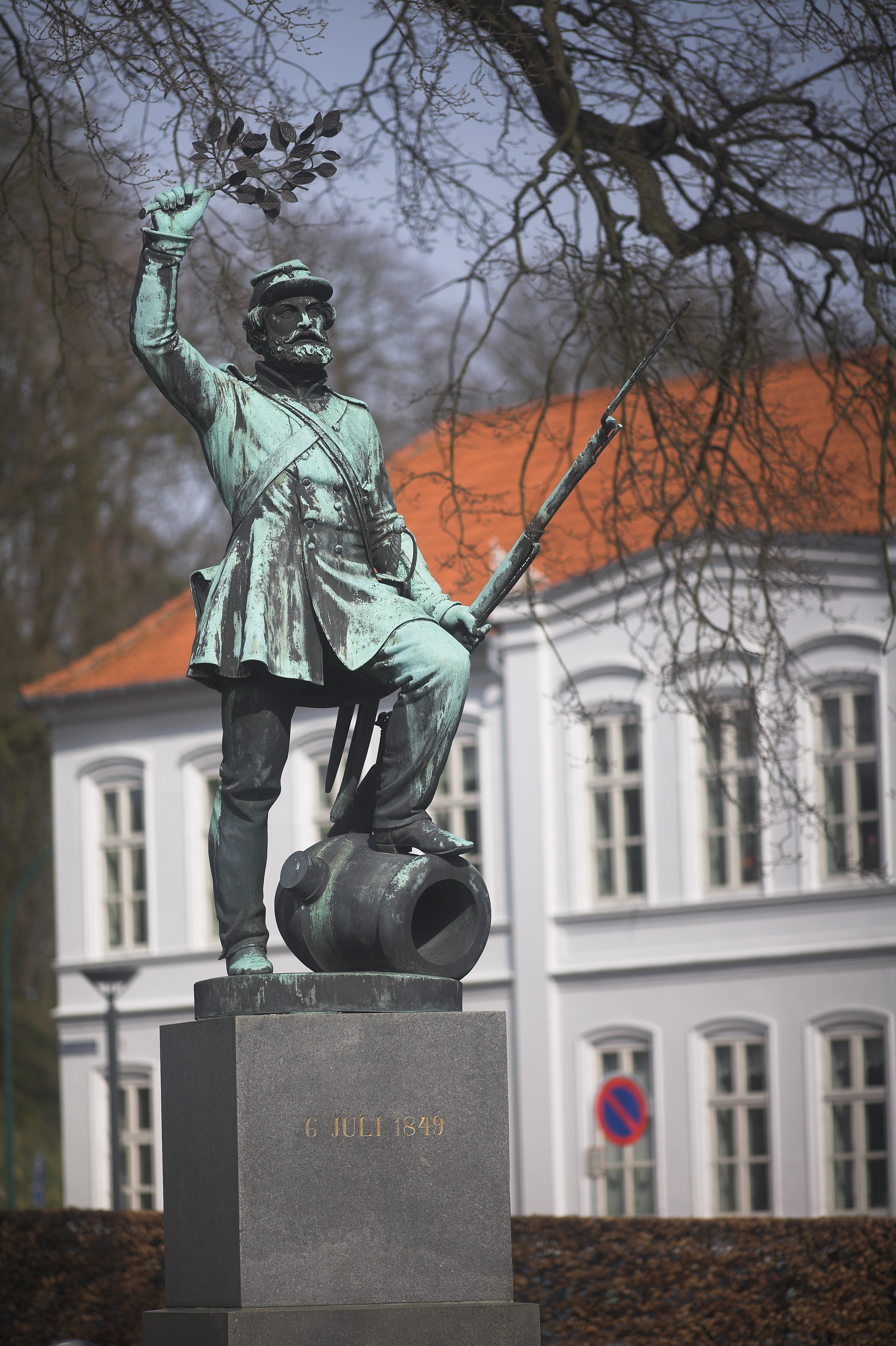
- The statue Landsoldaten ("The Foot Soldier") in Fredericia, Denmark

- Coat of arms

- Location in Denmark Fredericia (Region of Southern Denmark)
- Coordinates: 55°34′N 9°45′E
- Country: Denmark
- Region: Southern Denmark
- Municipality: Fredericia
- Founded: 1650
- Current municipality: 1970

Area
  - Urban: 27.4 km^{2} (10.6 sq mi)
- Elevation: 15 m (49 ft)

Population (2026)
  - Urban: 41,761
  - Urban density: 1,520/km^{2} (3,950/sq mi)
  - Gender: 20,932 males and 20,829 females
- Demonym: Fredericianer
- Time zone: UTC+1 (CET)
  - Summer (DST): UTC+2 (CEST)
- Postal code: DK-7000 Fredericia
- Area code: (+45) 72
- Website: fredericia.dk

Fredericia (Danish pronunciation: [fʁeðɐˈʁetɕæ, fʁæðɐˈʁætɕæ]) is a town located in Fredericia Municipality in the southeastern part of the Jutland peninsula in Denmark. The city is part of the Triangle Region, which includes the neighbouring cities of Kolding and Vejle. It was founded in 1650 by Frederick III, after whom it was named.

The city itself has a population of 41,761 (1 January 2026) and the Fredericia Municipality has a population of 52,939 (2026).

== History ==
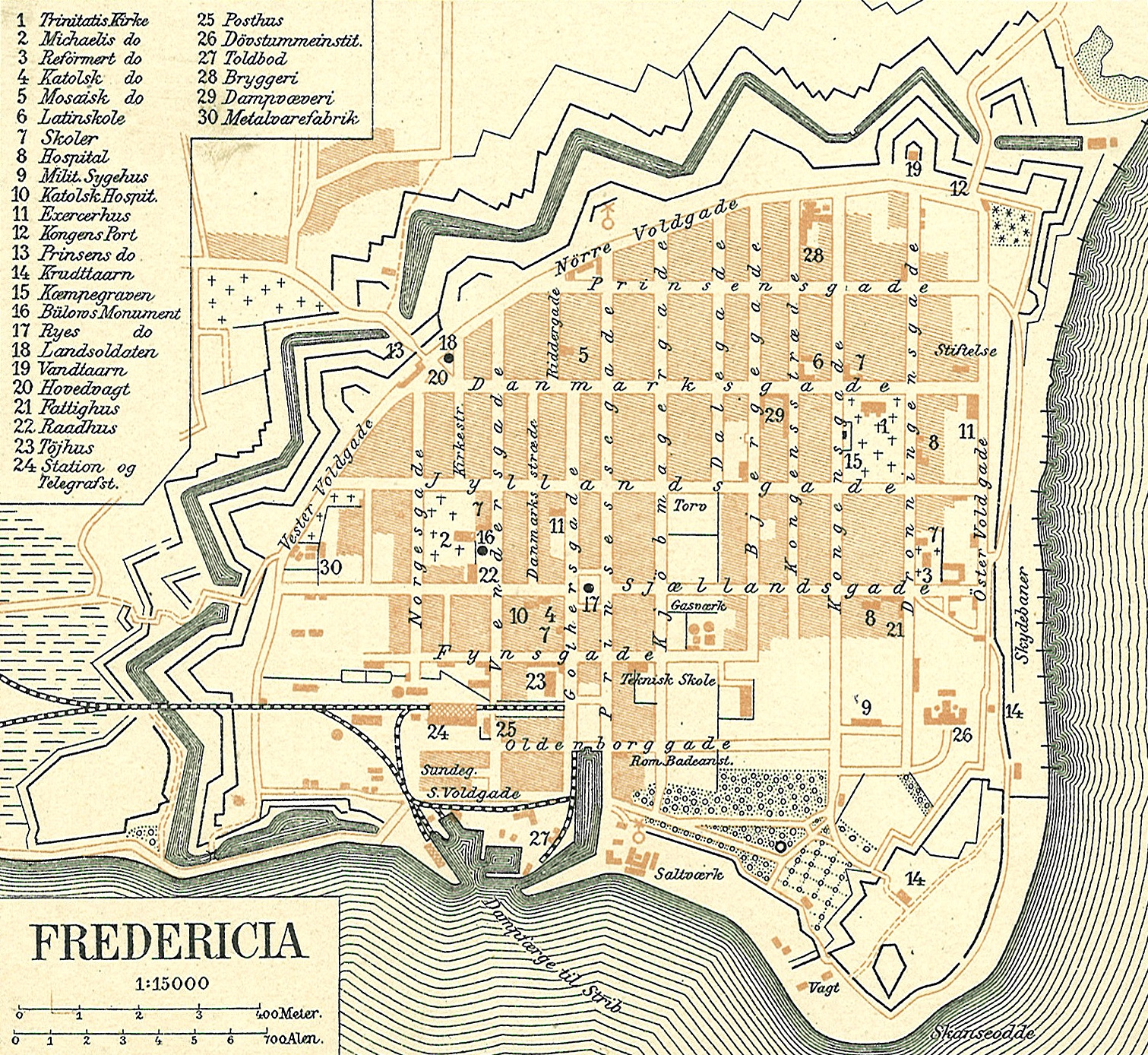
Plan of Fredericia in 1900

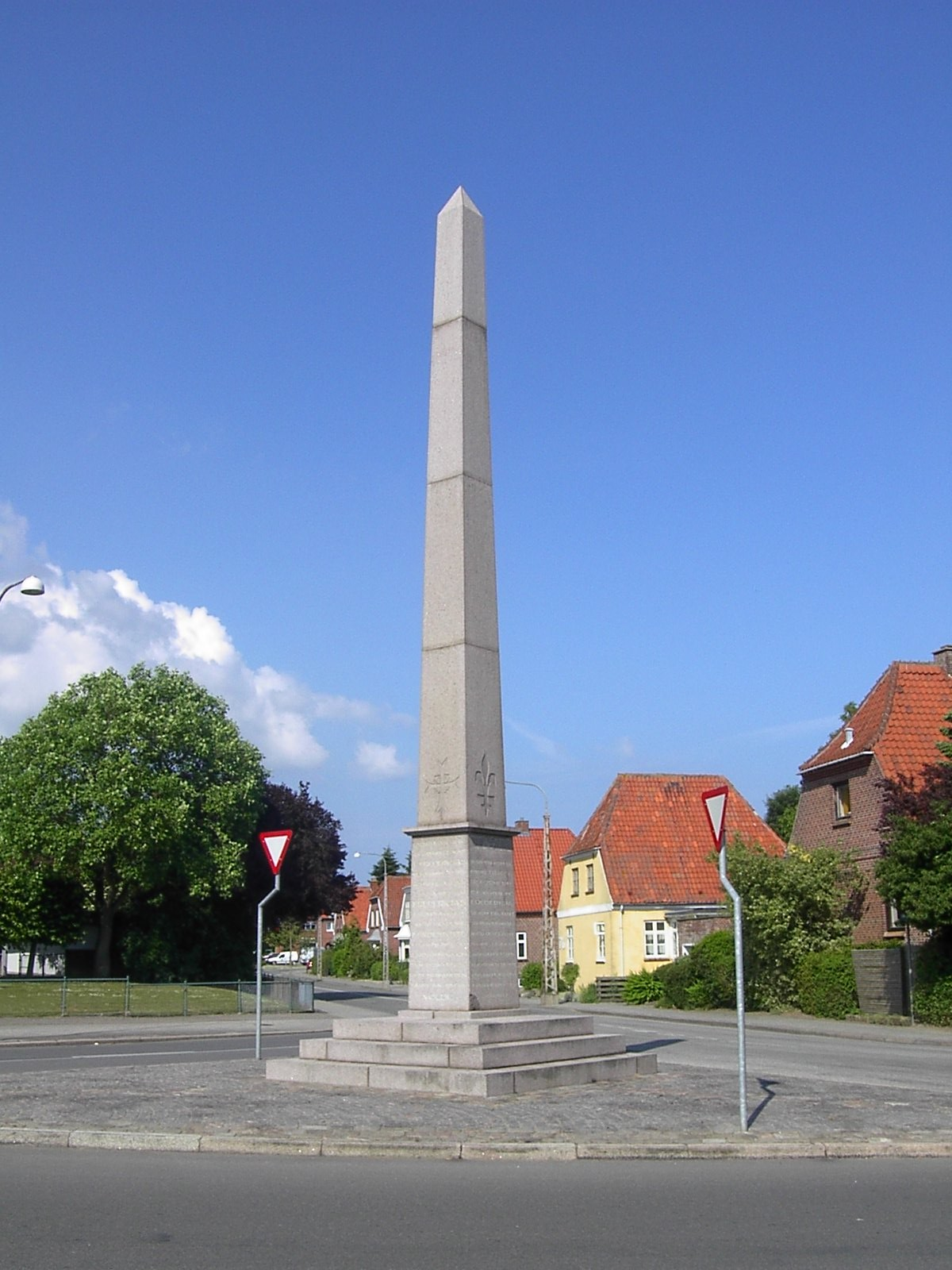
Obelisk erected to the memory of Huguenots arriving in the city after being driven out of northeastern France and Belgium by troops of Louis XIV

After the devastation caused by the Thirty Years War in a largely unfortified Jutland, King Christian IV realized the necessity of building a strong fortress in Jutland, and decided that this project could be combined with his plans for building a large town in Jutland.

A fortified encampment was built on a point of land called Lyngs Odde, near the current location of Fredericia, with a rampart stretching to either side of the point, thus protecting the encampment from attacks. However, the fortifications were not perfect, and when Swedish Field Marshal Lennart Torstenson invaded Jutland, he was able to break through the ramparts. It was Frederick III who was finally able to complete the plans for the fortification, also adding a flank fortification on nearby Bers Odde as suggested by Danish Marshal of the Realm Anders Bille.

On 15 December 1650, the King signed the document giving the town its first privileges, and work on the new fortifications could begin. In 1651, the town was named Frederiksodde (Frederick's Point) after the king, and on 22 April 1664, it was given the new Latinized name of Fredericia.

Every 6 July, the town of Fredericia holds a festival to commemorate the 1849 Battle of Fredericia, fought during the First War of Schleswig, in which Danish troops won a victory over the Schleswig-Holstein rebels who were laying siege to the town. Fredericia's landmark, Landsoldaten, was unveiled on 6 July 1858.

== Present ==
The municipality today is part of the East Jutland metropolitan area with 1.2M inhabitants, and is the site of Fredericia municipality's municipal council.

The town is a major barracks, home to the Royal Danish Army's Signals Regiment (Telegrafregimentet), which is located at Rye's Barracks (Ryes Kaserne) and Bülow's Barracks (Bülows Kaserne).

== Transportation ==
The town is one of Denmark's largest traffic hubs.

=== Rail ===
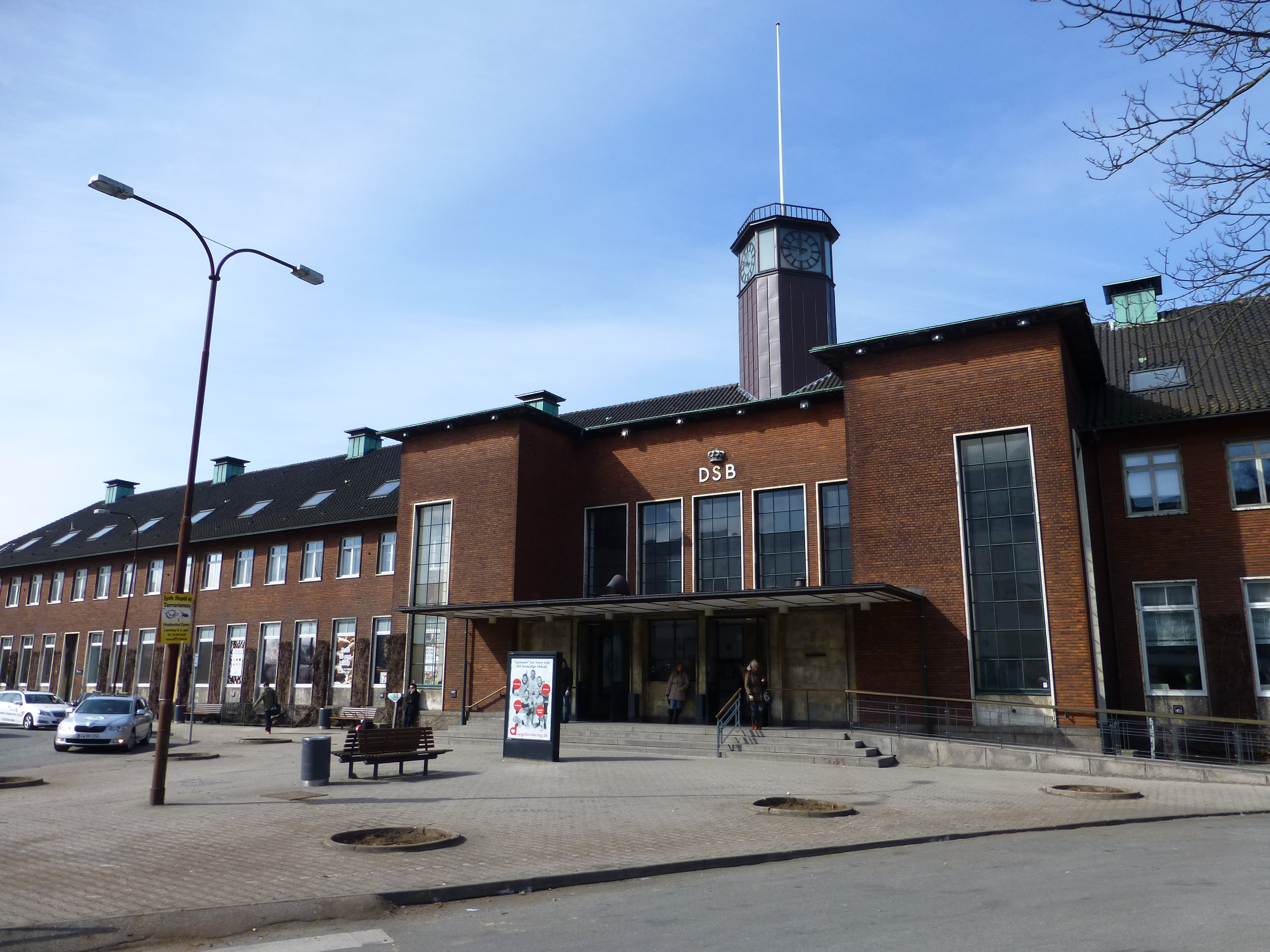
Fredericia railway station in 2013.

Fredericia railway station is the principal railway station of the town. It is an important railway junction where the Copenhagen-Fredericia Line, the Fredericia-Aarhus Line, and the Flensburg-Fredericia Line all meet. The station was opened in 1935 together with the opening of the Little Belt Bridge across the Little Belt. The train services are operated by the railway company DSB. It offers direct InterCity services to Copenhagen, Odense, Aarhus, Aalborg, Struer, Esbjerg, Sønderborg, Flensburg and Hamburg.

=== Air ===
The nearest airport with scheduled national and international flights is Billund Airport c. 45 km west of Fredericia.

== Sport ==
=== Speedway ===
The Vejlby Speedway Center, run by the Fredericia Motor Klub, is located on the northern outskirts of Fredericia and is a mini speedway track for bikes with 50cc and 80cc engines. Fredericia Speedway competed in the town from 1958 to 2005 at various venues, including the Fredericia Speedway Center (the old Fredericia Stadion) and the Frederikslyst Motorbane.

=== Handball ===
The handball club Fredericia HK and its predecessor Fredericia KFUM has won the Danish Championship several times, and they currently play in the top division.

=== Soccer ===
The local soccer team FC Fredericia was promoted to the Danish Superliga for the first time ever in 2025 after 24 years in the second best league.

== Arts and education ==
The former Danske Musicalakademi in Fredericia was in 2015 amalgamated with five other performing arts schools, to form the Danish National School of Performing Arts.

== Notable people ==
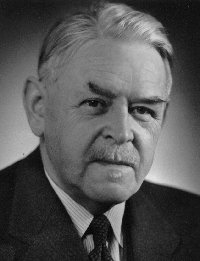
Vilhelm Buhl, pre-1954

=== The arts ===
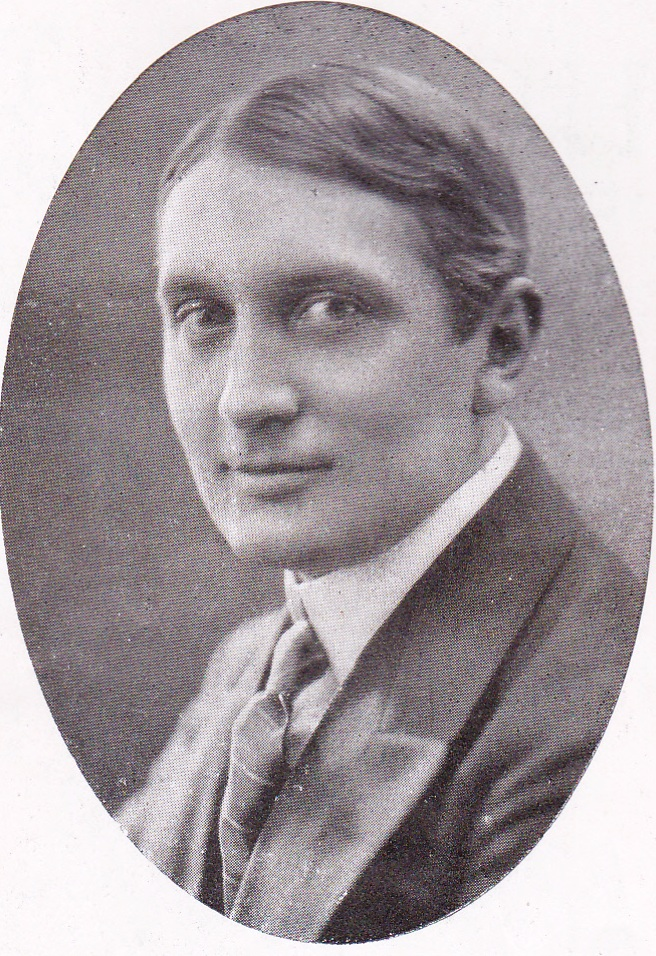
Svend Melsing, 1921

- Carit Etlar (1816 – 1900), Danish author of Gjøngehøvdingen in 1853
- Magdalene Thoresen (1819 – 1903), a Norwegian poet, novelist and playwright
- Henrik Pontoppidan (1857 – 1943), a Danish realist writer, shared the 1917 Nobel Prize for Literature
- Svend Rathsack (1885 – 1941), a Danish sculptor
- Svend Melsing (1888 – 1946), actor, theatre director and playwright
- Ellen Krause (1905 – 1990), a Danish artist, joined the Odsherred Painters
- Else Holmelund Minarik (1920 – 2012), an American author of children's books
- Tage Skou-Hansen (1925 – 2015), a Danish writer, editor and scholar
- Cecil Bødker (born 1927 - 2020), a writer of young adult fiction and a poet
- Erik Moseholm (1930 – 2012), a jazz composer, bandleader of the DR Big Band
- Harvey Martin (1942 - 2014), sculptor
- Kristian Blak (born 1947), a composer and musician in the Faroe Islands
- Martin Zandvliet (born 1971), a Danish film director and screenwriter
- Christian Holten Bonke (born 1973), a documentary filmmaker and screenwriter
- Søren Andersen (born in Fredericia), guitarist, singer, songwriter, producer
- Matias Saabye Køedt (Galimatias) (born in Fredericia), an electronic music artist best known for his 2015 EP Urban Flora with American singer-songwriter Alina Baraz

=== Sport ===
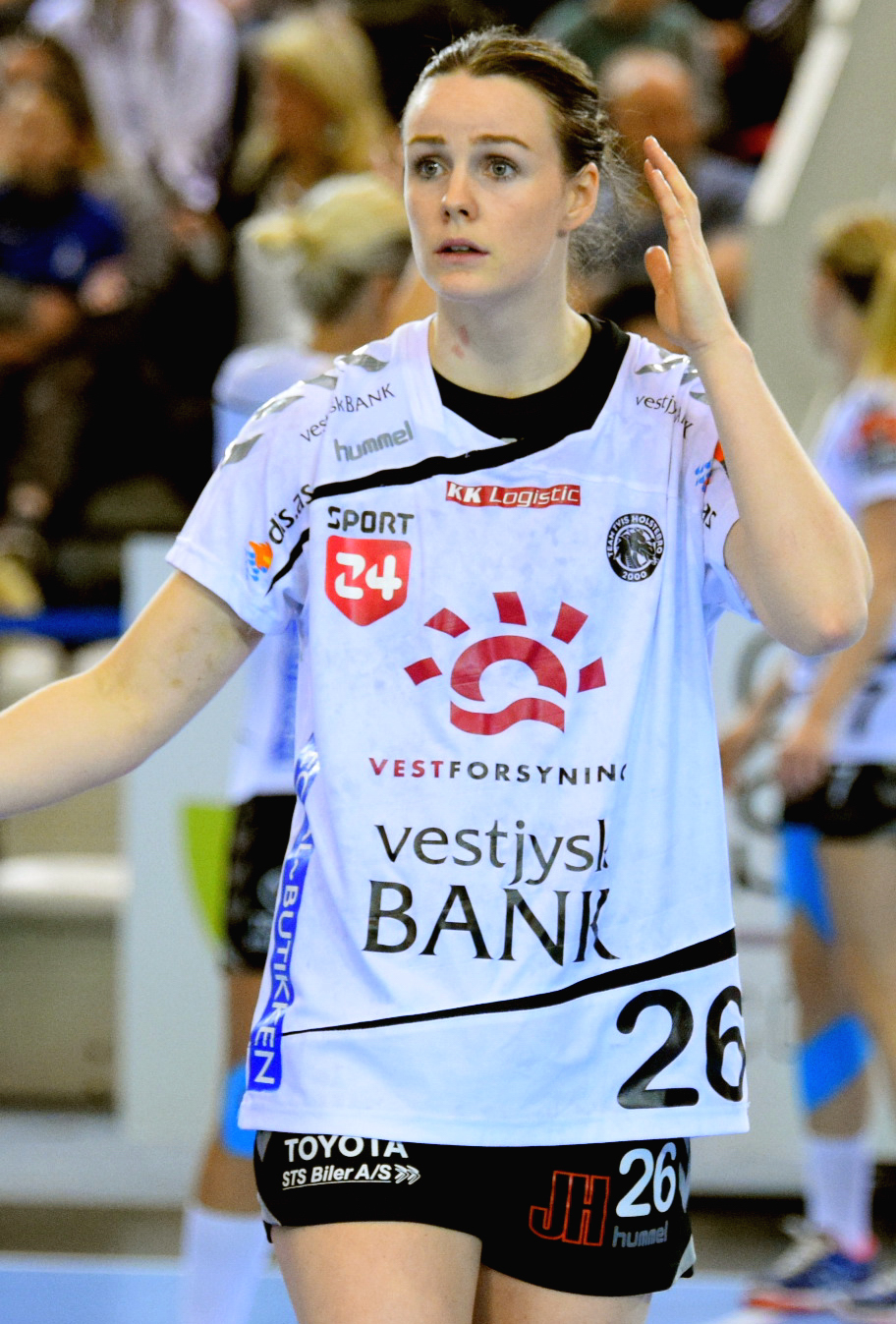
Annette Jensen, 2016

- Jesper Bank (born 1957 in Fredericia), a sailor, twice Olympic gold medallist in 1992 and 2000
- Peter Kjær (born 1965 in Fredericia), a Danish former footballer with 459 club caps
- Thomas Sørensen (born 1976 in Fredericia), football goalkeeper, 497 club caps and 101 for Denmark
- Patrick Hougaard (born 1989 in Fredericia), a Danish motorcycle speedway rider
- Annette Jensen (born 1991 in Fredericia), a Danish handball player
- Sara Thygesen (born 1991 in Fredericia), a badminton player, specializing in doubles play.
- Katrine Veje (born 1991 in Fredericia), a footballer, over 200 club caps and 119 for Denmark women

=== Others ===
- Jens Mikkelsen Ehrenborg (1621 – 1690), an officer, civil servant, and Swedish nobleman
- Jørgen Balthazar Winterfeldt (1732 - 1821), a naval officer and philanthropist
- Hartvig Philip Rée (1778 – 1859), a Jewish-Danish merchant and author
- Poul Pagh (1796 – 1870), a Danish merchant and shipowner
- Frederick Brockhausen (1858 – 1929), a cigar maker, trade unionist and US politician
- Vilhelm Buhl (1881 – 1954), the 11th Prime Minister of Denmark
- Erik Holtved (1899 – 1981), an archaeologist, ethnologist and artist
- Jørgen Vig Knudstorp (born in Fredericia), businessman, former CEO of Lego Group

== Twin towns ==
Härnösand, Sweden, since 1948; Herford, Germany, since 1987; Ilulissat, Greenland, since 1962	Kokkola, Finland, since 1948; Kristiansund, Norway, since 1948; Šiauliai, Lithuania, since 1993

== See also ==
- Fredericia municipality
