= Odsherred Painters =

Artists connected to Odsherred, Zealand, Denmark

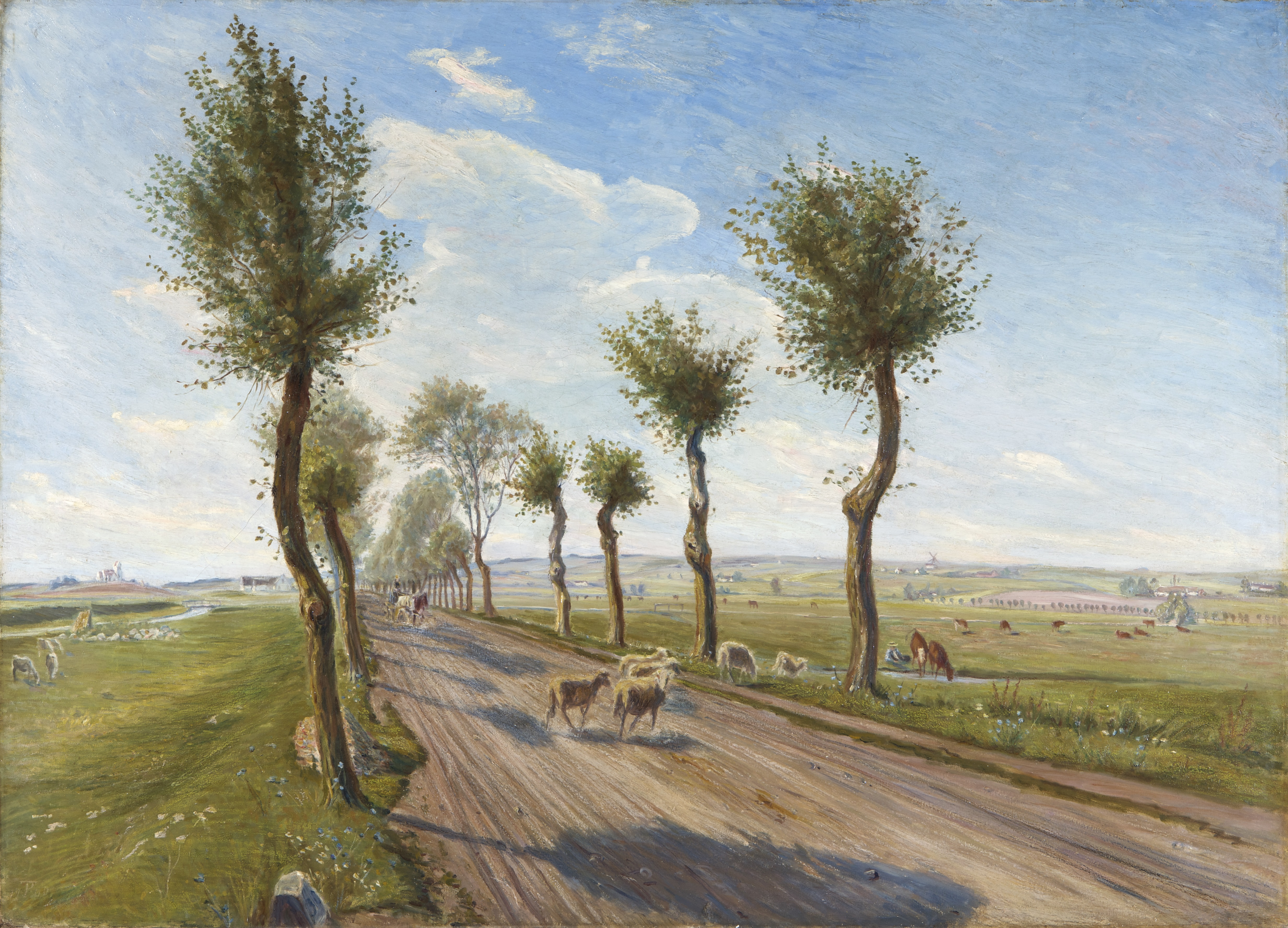
Theodor Philipsen: Landevej ved Faarevejle (1900)

Odsherred Painters (Danish: Odsherredsmalerne) is a term applied to Danish artists from various periods with connections to Odsherred in the northwest of Zealand, Denmark. Some were born there while others settled in the area or painted there. While the term includes painters from the 19th century such as Johan Thomas Lundbye, Vilhelm Kyhn and Vilhelm Melbye, it is applied more specifically to the painters who created landscapes from 1930 to 1970 and who formed an artists' colony. They include Karl Bovin, Kaj Ejstrup, Viggo Rørup, Ellen Krause, Lauritz Hartz, Povl Christensen, Victor Brockdorff and Sigurd Swane.

The group of Odsherred Painters which emerged in the 1930s was the most recent of Denmark's artists' colonies, the others being the Skagen Painters, the Funen Painters and the Bornholm school of painters.

== Artists' colony ==
The artists' colony grew up in the 1930s as a number of painters settled in the dramatic landscape in south-western Odsherred in the hilly countryside known as Vejrhøjbuen between Sejerø Bay and the now reclaimed Lammefjord. With Karl Bovin and Kaj Ejstrup as central figures, the artists rediscovered Naturalism and Figurativism at a time when Modernism was prevalent. Most of them knew each other from the Royal Danish Academy of Fine Arts. They settled in the same small area developing friendships based on common artistic ambitions. Initially they rented accommodation in old farms and cottages, often just for the summer, but later several of them purchased their own homes in the area. The group were successful in reviving Naturalism in the 1930s, partly by arranging the Corner series of exhibitions in Copenhagen.

The colony which started in the 1930s was led by Karl Bovin (1907-85) and Kaj Ejstrup (1902-56). Members included Lauritz Hartz (1903-87), Viggo Rørup (1903-71) and his wife Ellen Krause (1905-1990), Victor Brockdorff (19121-92), Ernst Syberg (1906-81), Povl Christensen (1909-77), Alfred Simonsen (1906-35), Ole Kielberg (1911-85), Søren Hjorth Nielsen (1901-83) and Birthe Bovin (1906-80). Bovin, Hartz and Rørup spent their entire lives in Odsherred while the others returned for shorter or longer periods each summer. They were attracted by the dramatic landscape with its steep slopes and burial mounds as well as by the rather frugal look of the countryside. It coincided with their wish as naturalists to have a constant source of inspiration for their work.

The open skies, extensive fields, rolling hills and coastal flats of Odsherred became the favourite subjects of their landscapes. Initially they were known as Mørkemalerne (The Dark Painters) as a result of their sombre palette but later they used brighter, more Impressionistic tones. In Karl Bovin's words: "It's all a matter of mapping out an area, and we can also include the seasonal climate we have here in Denmark; that, the climate, has become a constant motif as it is so changeable—and so it has actually become a kind of Danish Naturalistic painting."

== Other visiting artists ==
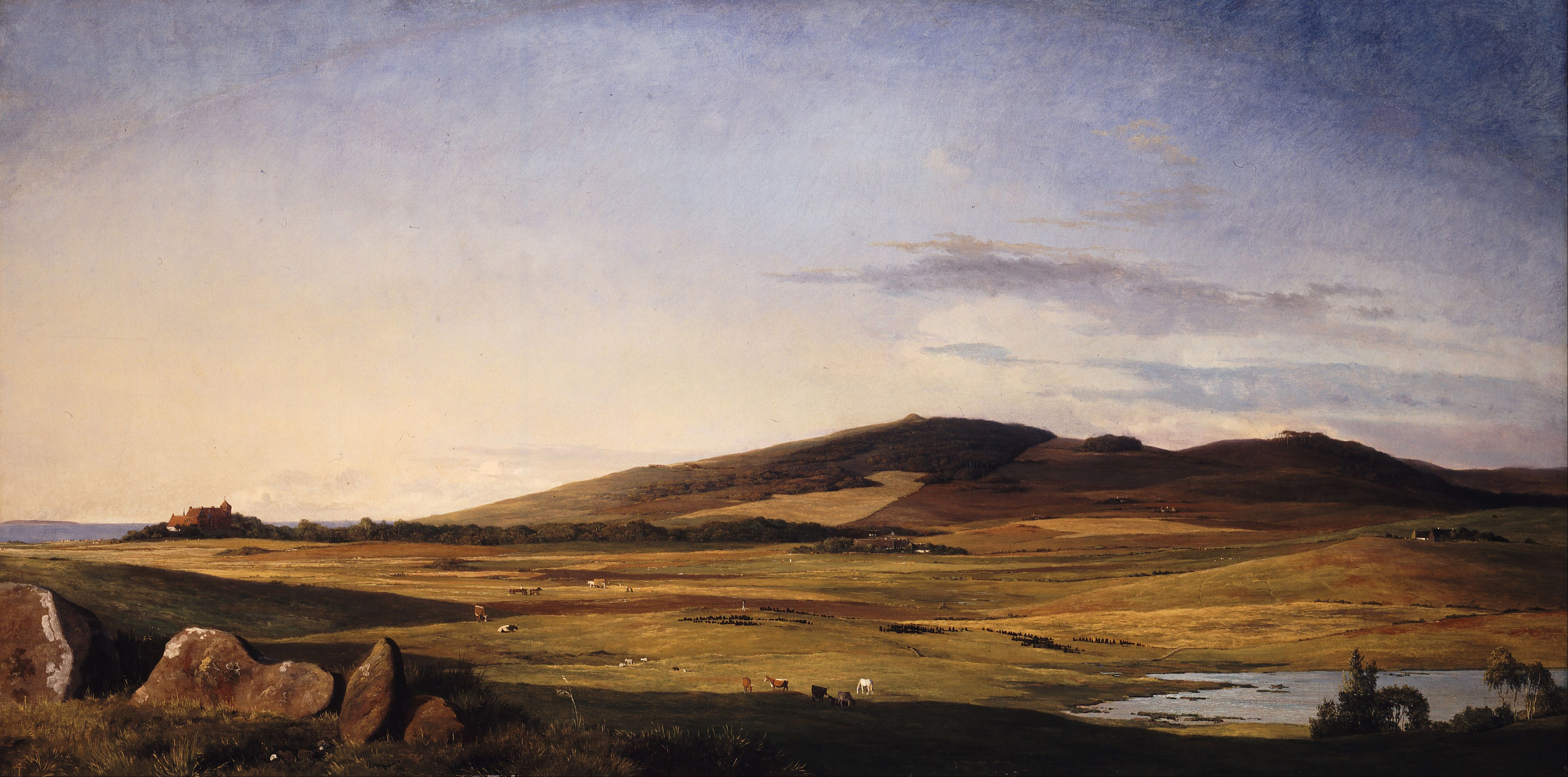
Johan Thomas Lundbye: Zealand Landscape. View from Bjerresø Mark towards Vejrhøj and Dragsholm Manor (1840)

The first painting of the Odsherred landscape was completed by Johan Thomas Lundbye in 1840. Typical of Denmark's Golden Age, it presents a scene north of Bjergsø with the Vejrhøj Hill and Dragsholm Manor. The Odsherred landscape has also been depicted in the works of Vilhelm Kyhn (1819-1903), who painted Rørvig, and Theodor Philipsen (1840-1920), who painted the road near Fårevejle and Vejrhøj. The hills in the west of Odsherred were painted by Carla Colsmann Mohr (1887-1974), Asta Ring Schultz (1895-1978), Ingrid Wichmann ( 1903-2006 ) and, last but not least, Ejnar Nielsen (1872-1956), who had taught several of the Odsherred Painters at the Academy and was encouraged to join them around 1940.

There were also a number of artists who had connections with Vallekilde Højskole in southwest Odsherred. The school was founded by Ernst Trier in 1885, producing several generations of artists. They included Troels Trier (1879-1962) and his sons Holmer (1916-1999) and Ernst (1920-1979). Paul Nyhuus (1910-1970) also had connections with the school. Others included Aksel Møller (1909-1994) who moved to Odsherred in 1944, Helge Ernst (1916-1990), who spent many summers in Odsherred, and the sculptors Johannes Hansen (1903-1995) and Knud Nellemose (1906-1997) who returned to the area every summer. The artists Poul S. Nielsen (1920-1998), Julius Wederkinch (1919-1992) and Johannes Carstensen (1924-2010) lived in the west of Odsherred in the hills, painting the local landscape. Anders Gudmundsen-Holmgreen (1892-1967) painted scenes of summer life and bathing girls in Odsherred. From 1960, Lars Sylvest Jakobsen (1909-2005) lived and painted in Nykøbing while Jørgen Brynjolf (1931-1993) and Ole Finding (born 1937) discovered new motifs in Odsherred.

== Literature ==
- Fabritius, Elisabeth (2007). Danish Artists' Colonies: The Skagen Painters, the Funen Painters, the Bornholm Painters, the Odsherred Painters. Skagens Museum. ISBN 978-87-88686-39-5.
- Flugt, Tommy (2011). Tidsskrift for Kunst 2011 #2: Tidsskrift om Odsherreds Kunstmuseum, Malergården og Huset i Asnæs (in Danish). Aurora.
- Granhøj Jørgensen, Hardy (2013). Modernisme midt i naturen Odsherredsmalerne. Museum Odsherred, Kunstmuseet i Asnæs. ISBN 978-87-993053-1-5.
- Valentiner, Gitte (2004). Odsherredsmalerne - en kunstnerkoloni. Odsherreds Kunstmuseum. ISBN 978-87-989993-0-0.
