= Buddinge =

Suburb of Copenhagen, Denmark

Coordinates: 55°44′N 12°30′E

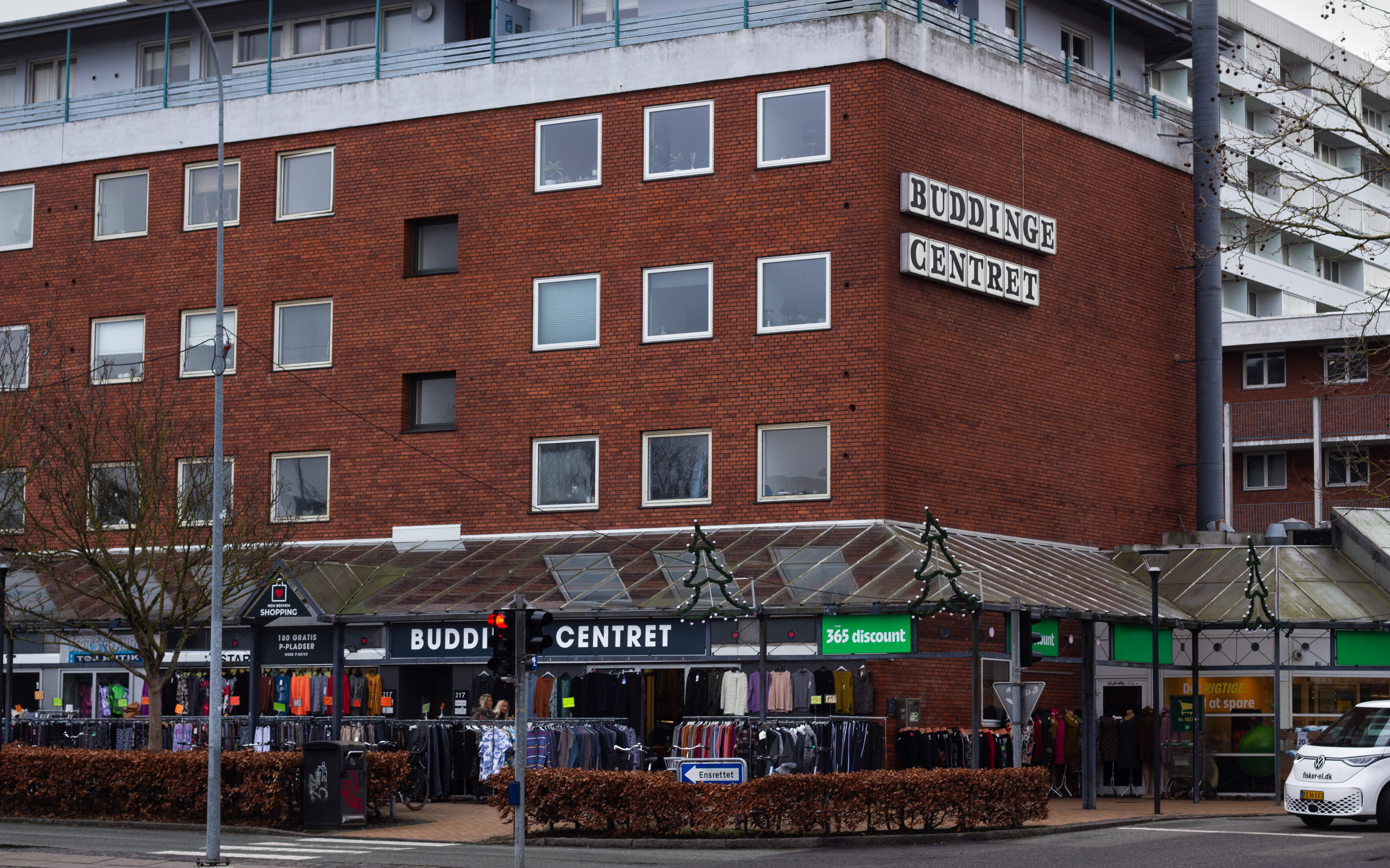
Buddinge Centre in January 2025

Buddinge is a suburb 10 km northwest of central Copenhagen, Denmark. The suburb used to be a small village, but by the 1960s merged with nearby suburban areas, subsequently becoming a suburb. The suburb is part of Gladsaxe municipal and is connected by the S-Train with two stations: Buddinge and Kildebakke.

== Notable people ==
- Andreas Petersen (1901 in Buddinge – 1976) a Danish boxer who competed in the 1924 Summer Olympics
- Kaj Ejstrup (1902–1956) a Danish artist, illustrator and sculptor and an Odsherred painter, brought up in Buddinge
