= Birthe Bovin =

Danish painter

Berthe (Birthe) Marie Marensine Bovin (31 January 1906 – 12 August 1980) was a self-taught Danish painter who joined the artists' colony in northwestern Zealand known as the Odsherred Painters.

== Biography ==
The daughter of a fisherman, Bovin was born in Kerteminde on the island of Funen. In 1933, she married the poet Sigfred Pedersen but the marriage was dissolved in 1943. From the 1940s, Bovin lived in Odsherred where she established contact with the Odsherred Painters. A self-taught painter, she painted landscapes in the area but was also inspired by her travels to Italy and Greece. In 1952, she married Karl Bovin, one of the most prominent members of the Odesherred artists' colony. In addition to her paintings and drawings, Birthe Bovin was also active in sculpture. She painted many watercolours and oils of the Odsherred landscape.
