= Victor Brockdorff =

Danish painter

Arthur Victor Schack von Brockdorff, generally known as Victor Brockdorff, (October 11, 1911 – February 25, 1992) was a Danish painter who joined the artists' colony known as the Odsherred Painters in Northwestern Zealand in the early 1930s. He was a cofounder of the Corner Artists' Association.

== Biography ==
The son of a shipmaster, Brockdorff was born in the Frederiksberg district of Copenhagen. After studying privately under Ernst Zeuthen and Olivia Holm Møller from 1926 to 1929, he studied graphic art under Aksel Jørgensen at the Royal Danish Academy of Fine Arts (1931–34). He debuted at the Kunstnernes Efterårsudstilling (autumn exhibition) at Den Frie in 1930, and was a co-founder of the Corner Exhibition in 1932 where he frequently exhibited.

In the 1930s, Brockdorff moved to Odsherred where he associated with the Odsherred Painters and painted landscapes of the area. However, he became interested in painting portraits, as well as city scenes, especially of the Nørrebro district of Copenhagen. His style evolved from Modernism to Realism. Typical subjects included children playing on the pavement, people waiting at bus stops, and rainy street scenes. Increasingly, his works took on a political slant, especially the monumental paintings he completed for the Communist Party's congress in 1952. Painting scenes depicting workers, he became associated with social realism.

Starting in 1946, he spent 5 years in Paris, sending illustrated reports of socialist movements to the Copenhagen journals Nationaltidende and Land og Folk, developing his skills as an illustrator. He continued to be an active painter, producing strikingly colourful interiors, such as Eremitagesletten and Fluepapiret ved Charlottenlund in 1974. Brockdorff also painting portraits, such as one of Queen Margrethe for the Søofficerforeningen (Naval Officers Association).
