= Kaj Ejstrup =

Danish artist, illustrator, and sculptor (1902–1956)

Kaj Ejstrup (20 February 1902 – 23 November 1956) was a Danish artist, illustrator and sculptor. Above all, he is remembered for the landscapes he painted in the north west of Zealand as a member of the artists' colony known as the Odsherred Painters. In 1932, he was one of the founding members of the Corner artists association. Much of his work can be seen at Odsherreds Museum of Art.

== Biography ==
The adopted son of a customs official, Ejstrup was brought up in Buddinge, north of Copenhagen. A self-taught painter, he was unsuccessful in gaining admission to the Royal Danish Academy of Fine Arts but learnt wood engraving under Aksel Jørgensen in various periods from 1931 to 1937.

He debuted in 1926 at the Kunstnernes Efterårsudstilling (Artists' Autumn Exhibition) and was a founding member of the Corner exhibition in 1932. In 1930, he settled in Åsen near Ordrup in Odsherred together with Karl Bovin and later bought an old homestead near Skamlebæk where he lived until 1944. Thereafter, every year he spent extensive periods in Odsherred.

== Artistic style and works ==
Ejstrup's evocative scenes of the peaceful countryside are painted with a rather limited palette. They often include buildings, outhouses, farm animals and the occasional human figure but most impressively they sometimes feature horses, often running or jumping about, giving the works a dramatic effect. By contrast, his figure paintings are more vividly coloured and have an expressive tone. His engravings include Tolv træsnit fra byen (Twelve Woodcuts from the City, 1935).

Ejstrup's paintings, woodcuts, sculptures and drawings can be seen in many of Denmark's art museums. Statens Museum for Kunst has a large collection of his works. His work has been widely exhibited in Denmark as well as in Glasgow, Oslo and Gothenburg.

Ejstrup was awarded the Eckersberg Medal in 1954.

== Literature ==
- Albrechtsen, Jørgen; Valentiner, Gitte (1994). Kaj Ejstrup (in Danish). Odsherreds Kunstmuseum.
