= Søren Hjorth Nielsen =

Danish painter and illustrator

Søren Hjorth Nielsen (2 August 1901 – 7 July 1983) was a Danish painter and illustrator. He is remembered for his paintings of the allotments and outskirts of Copenhagen and later for his landscapes of the Bramsnæs Vig area in northwestern Zealand. He was a professor of painting at the Royal Danish Academy of Fine Arts from 1957 to 1971.

== Biography ==
Born near Silkeborg, Hjorth Nielsen studied at the Royal Danish Academy under Ejnar Nielsen, Aksel Jørgensen and Einar Utzon-Frank. His earliest works at the Technical School in Silkeborg were detailed ink and watercolours including interiors. In 1923, he began etching with motifs from Copenhagen and the area around his home as well as scenes around Odsherred where he spend some time in the 1930s. From 1926, he created religious subjects. His painting was essentially realistic, sometimes bordering on the grotesque. His Spisehuset (1935) depicts the loneliness of a poor city dweller while other works cover the disadvantaged and homeless inhabitants of Christianshavn. For a time he also worked as a portrait painter. His favourite subjects included the allotments and harbour districts of Copenhagen. From 1954, Hjorth Nielsen also created a series of works depicting the roofs of the city he observed from his penthouse on Gammel Strand. His landscapes included summer scenes at Vester Åby on Funen and around Bramsnæs Vig on the west coast of Zealand; the houses and vegetation in the bottom half of the paintings contrasted with the stillness of the low-set horizon. In his later years, he painted a number of summer and winter scenes from his house at Tempelhuse to the south-east of Holbæk.

His work developed from Expressionism in his early years to participation in the renewal of Danish landscape painting. He was also active in etchings and woodcuts covering studies of models at the Academy, sketches during his travels or landscape depictions. He was also a keen draftsman, often producing crayon drawings as a basis for his oils.

== Awards ==
Hjorth Nielsen was awarded the Eckersberg Medal in 1949 and the Thorvaldsen Medal in 1972.

== Literature ==
- Nielsen, Peder Kristian; Petersen, Torben Holm; Andersen, Troels (1976). Søren Hjorth Nielsen: grafik og tegninger i Silkeborg Kunstmuseum. Silkeborg Kunstmueum. ISBN 978-87-980325-2-6.
- Nielsen, Søren Hjorth; Andersen, Dorte Kirkeby (2001). Søren Hjorth Nielsen: 100 år. Silkeborg kunstmuseums forlag. ISBN 978-87-87932-73-8.
