= Elisabeth Wandel =

Danish painter (1850–1926)

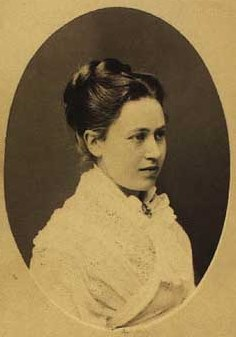
- Elisabeth Wandel, Photograph by Georg Emil Hansen
- Born: Elisabeth Christiane Møller; 14 January 1850; Copenhagen, Denmark
- Died: 28 December 1926 (aged 76); Copenhagen, Denmark
- Known for: Painting
- Spouse: Oscar Andreas Wandel

Elisabeth Christiane Alvina Wandel (née Møller; January 14, 1850 – December 28, 1926) was a Danish painter. She was best known for her portraits and landscape paintings. Wandel painted depictions of rural and domestic life, and in the 1890s produced a large number of portraits.

Wandel studied painting with Carl Thomsen and Peder Severin Krøyer. Initially, she worked in pastels, before producing oil paintings later in her career. Her works were exhibited widely across Europe from the 1880s through the 1920s. Her son, Sigurd Wandel, also became a painter.

== Biography ==
Elisabeth Christiane Alvina Møller was born on 14 January 1850 in Copenhagen, Denmark. She was the daughter of Thora Adelaide Beck and Andreas Christian Møller, a wine merchant. She studied painting under Carl Thomsen and Peder Severin Krøyer.

On her birthday in 1871, she married Oscar Andreas Wandel (1845–1925), who was an art collector, and like her father, a wine merchant. Together, they had two children: Carl Ellis Wandel (1871–1940) and Sigurd Wandel (1875–1947). Their son, Sigurd, like his mother, became a painter.

Wandel exhibited at Charlottenborg Spring Exhibition in the years 1887–1900, 1902, and 1912–22; at the Nordic Exhibition of 1888 in Copenhagen; and the Exposition Universelle (1889) in Paris. She also exhibited her work at the Palace of Fine Arts and The Woman's Building at the 1893 World's Columbian Exposition in Chicago.

Wandel died on 28 December 1926 in Copenhagen and was buried at Holmen Cemetery.

== Gallery ==
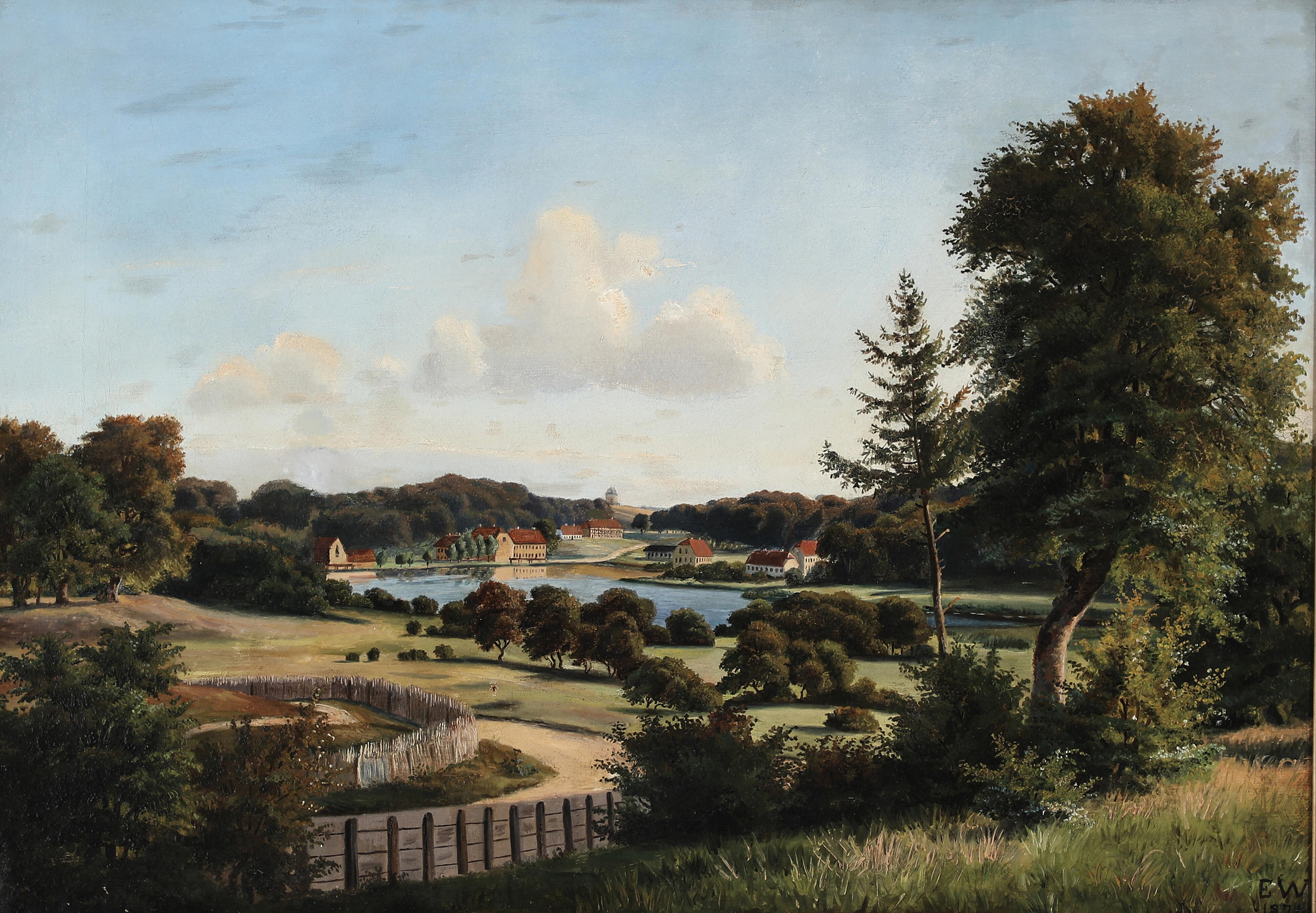
Parti fra Raadvad med Eremitageslottet i baggrunden, oil on canvas, 1871

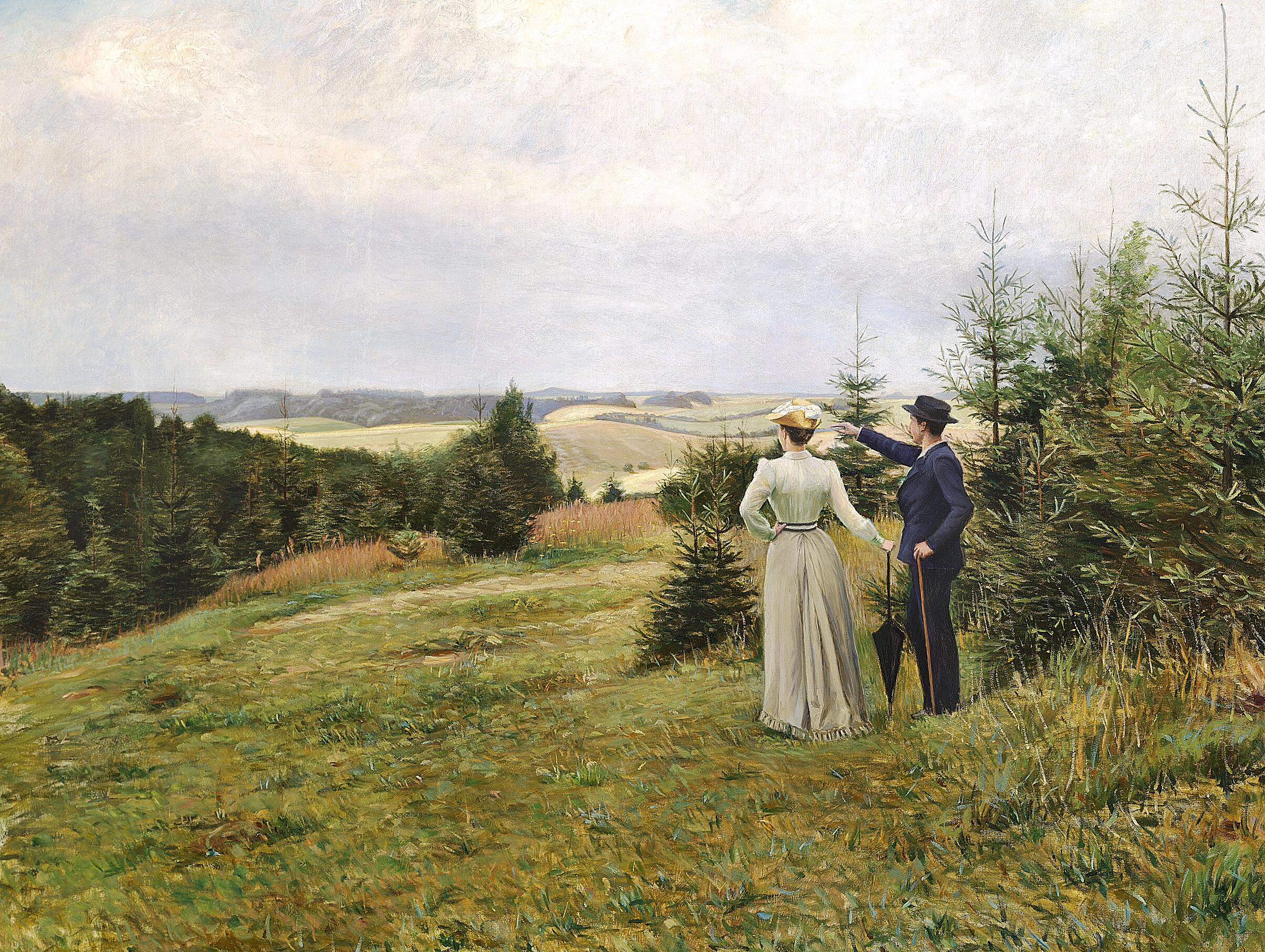
Sommerdag i August. Motiv fra Bakkerne ved Hjortekjærshuse, oil on canvas, c.1893

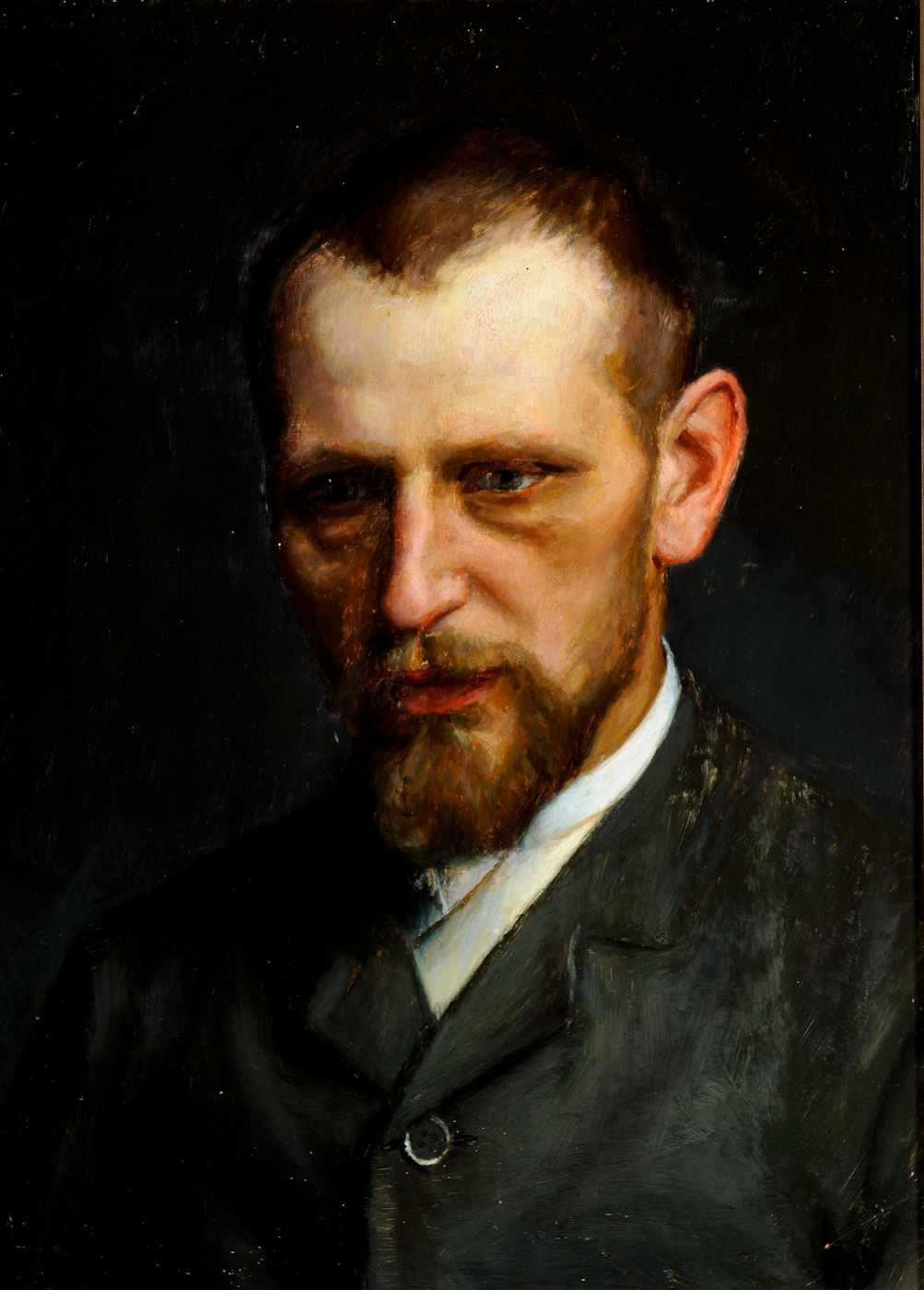
Portrait of Laurits Andersen Ring, oil on panel

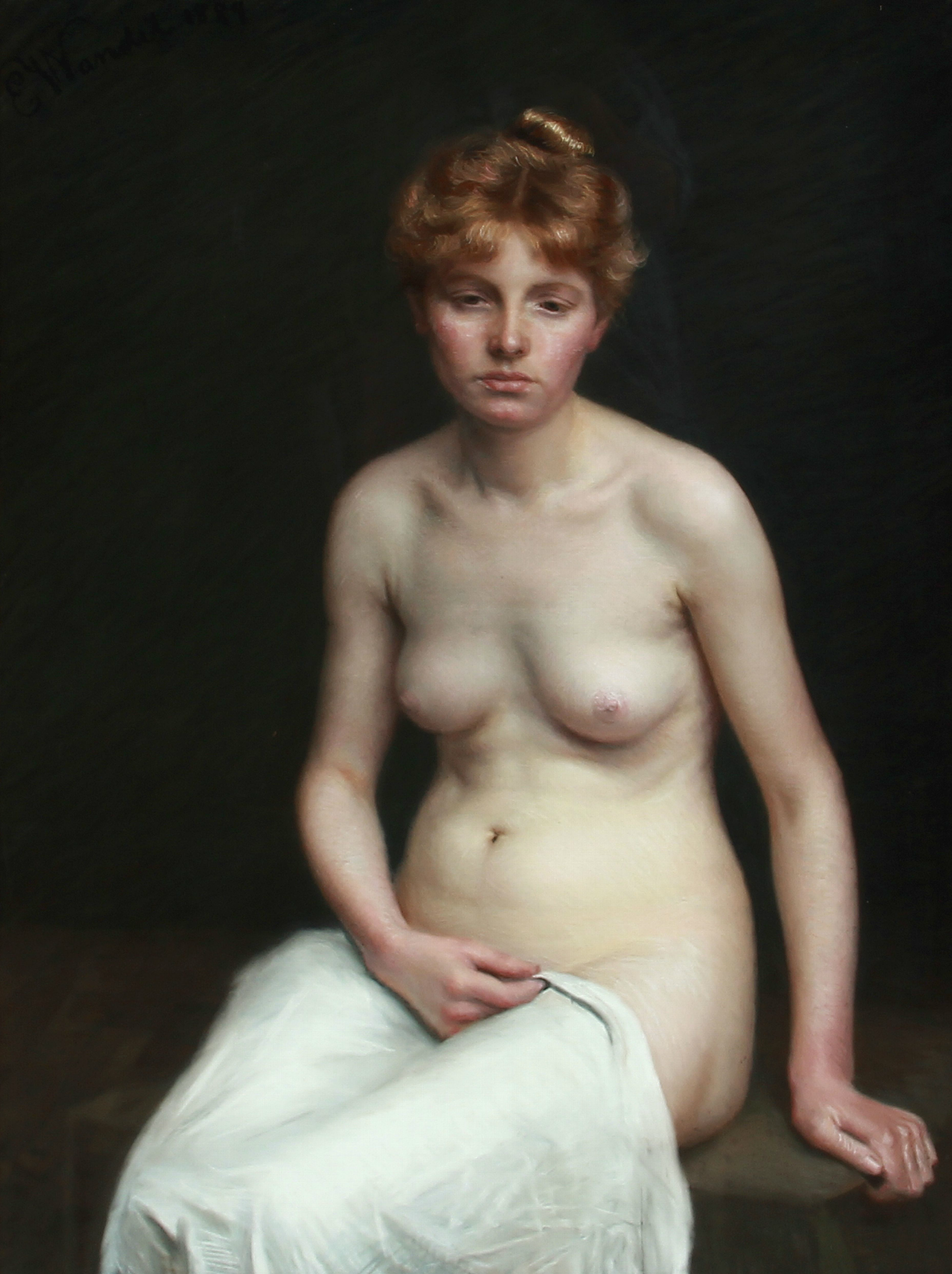
Young woman, pastel on paper, 1889

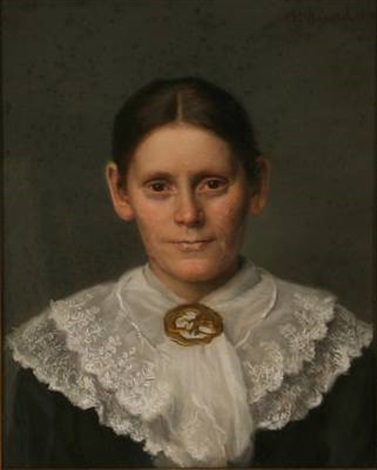
Portrait of Thora Juliane Madsen, née Nielsen, 1890

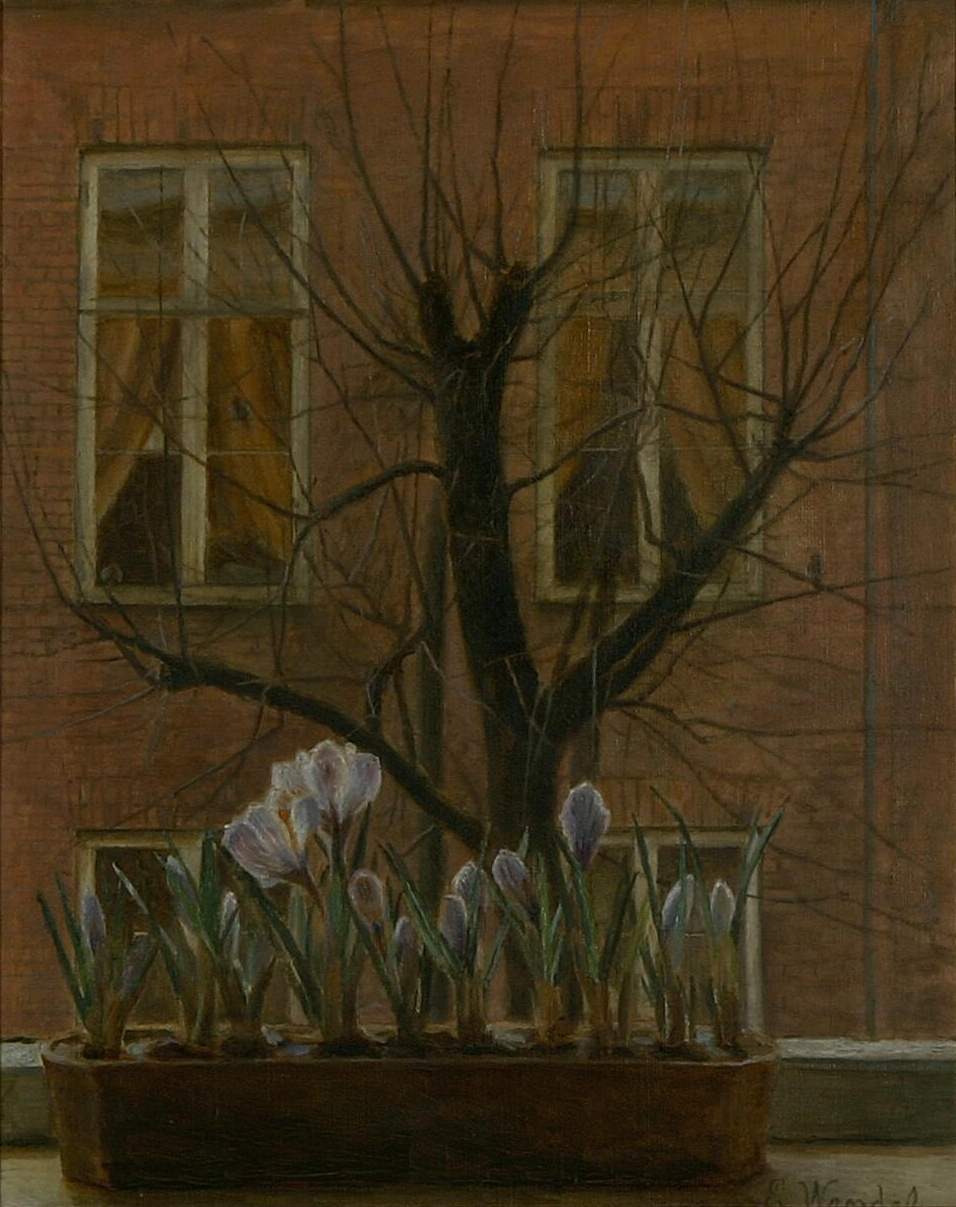
Krokus i vindueskarmen, oil on canvas
