= Karl Bovin =

Danish painter (1907–1985)

Karl (Kalle) Christian Bovin (1907–1985) was a Danish painter whose work focused on landscapes of Odsherred, a region in the north-west of Zealand. In the 1930s, he became a central member in the Odsherred Painters artists' colony and helped to found the Corner artists association.

== Biography ==
Bovin was born in Frederikshavn, as the eldest son of a stone mason. From an early age, he was interested in art. In the 1920s, he cycled to the artists paradise Skagen in the north of Jutland to show his early works to Anna and Michael Ancher. At their encouragement, he attended the Royal Danish Academy of Art in Copenhagen from 1928 to 1931, where he studied under Sigurd Wandel and Aksel Jørgensen. During his time at school, he associated with a group of constructivists who relied on intuition and observation, but eventually expressed dissatisfaction with their approach to art.

He therefore joined fellow artist Kaj Ejstrup in Odsherred to concentrate on nature and landscape painting. Slowly, other artists followed, forming the so-called Odsherredsmalerne (Odsherred Painters) who founded the Corner painters association. In 1932, one of Bovin's landscapes was bought by the Statens Museum for Kunst, the Danish national gallery, strengthening his reputation as an artist. In the early 1930s, he also spent time with the Funen Painters, especially Johannes Larsen and Fritz Syberg to establish a relationship between the two artists' colonies.

== Painting styles ==
His earlier paintings are characterised by dull tones, influenced by the woes of the times. By the end of the 1930's however, his paintings became livelier. He specialized in landscapes, producing works which often had a high horizon and excelled in conveying the changing weather conditions he encountered in Odsherred. Several of his early works depict scenes of winter and autumn with ploughed fields and occasional farm buildings. Later he adopted a lighter palette and painted summer scenes, often comparable to those of the Funen Painters. The time he spent in Skagen during the mid-1950s contributed to his sketchy style of painting with stronger and more brilliant color. After travelling to Bahrein with the archaeologist P.V. Glob in the 1950s and 1960's, his paintings incorporated even more color and brightness. He found he could better represent these effects in watercolours than in oils. Though closely involved with the impressionists, he continued to develop his own style and motifs through painting his natural surroundings in winter, summer and spring. Eventually, he would be considered one of the most renowned landscape painters of the 20th century.

Bovin continued to paint until the 1970s, when his poor health prevented him from working. Much of his work can be seen at Odsherreds Museum of Art, but the largest collection of his, totaling 120 items, can be found at the Frederikshavn Art Museum.

== Family ==
Bovin first married the artist Amy Victoria Krog-Jensen in 1934. After this marriage had been dissolved in 1951, he married the painter Bertha (Birthe) Marie Marensine Pedersen in 1952. Known as Birthe Bovin, she also painted watercolors and oils of the Odsherred landscape.

== Literature ==
- Fabritius, Elisabeth (2007). Danish Artists' Colonies: The Skagen Painters, the Funen Painters, the Bornholm Painters, the Odsherred Painters. Skagens Museum. ISBN 978-87-88686-39-5.
- Flugt, Tommy (2011). Tidsskrift for Kunst 2011 #2: Tidsskrift om Odsherreds Kunstmuseum, Malergården og Huset i Asnæs (in Danish). Aurora.
- Granhøj Jørgensen, Hardy (2013). Modernisme midt i naturen Odsherredsmalerne. Museum Odsherred, Kunstmuseet i Asnæs. ISBN 978-87-993053-1-5.
