= Corner painters =

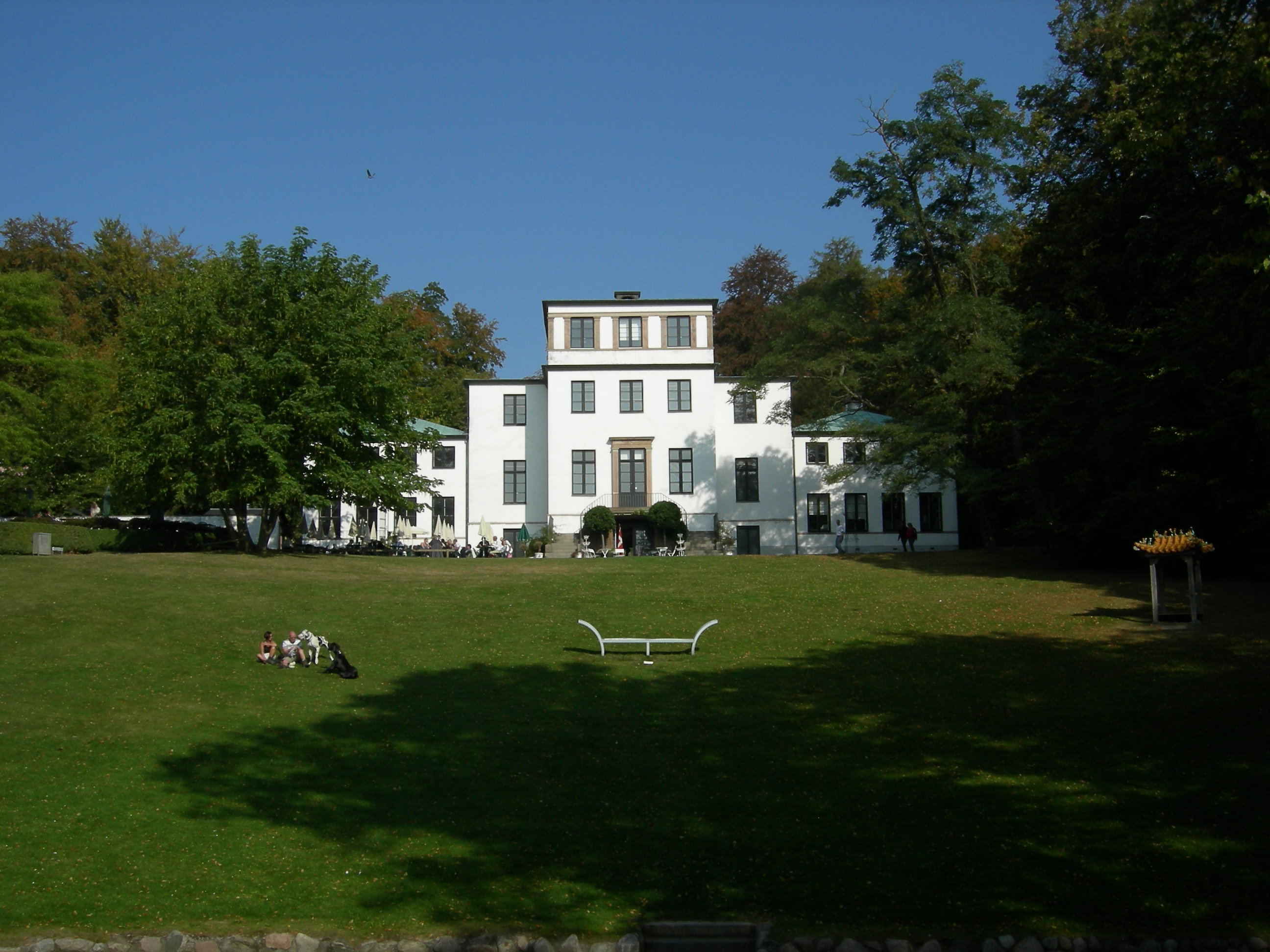
Sophienholm where Corner arranges an annual exhibition

The Corner painters in Denmark first came together in 1932 when they decided to hold an exhibition in a meeting hall inside an office building on the corner of Vester Voldgade and Studiestræde in the centre of Copenhagen. The group was soon referred to simply as Corner.

Among its earlier members were Karl Bovin, Victor Brockdorff, Povl Christensen, Kaj Ejstrup, Lauritz Hartz, Alfred Simonsen, Viggo Rørup and Erik Raadal.

Today, with its 45 members, it is the second largest artists association in Denmark. Regular exhibitions are still held, attracting thousands of visitors. The artists themselves are made up of painters, sculptors, photographers and musicians. They meet regularly and arrange annual exhibitions which attract large numbers of visitors.

== Members of Corner ==
As of November 29, 2023, the association currently consists of 45 visual artists.

Current Members (As of November 2023)
Celia Paul; Paula Rego; Matvey Slavin (MatWay); Henning Andersen; Martin Askholm; Maria Bianca Barmen; Elisabeth Bergsøe; Linda Bjørnskov; Jens Bohr; Per Baagøe; Uffe Christoffersen; Mia Nelle Drøschler; Maja Lisa Engelhardt; Daniel Enkaoua; Alba S. Enström	Claus Handgaard; Bente Hansen; Merete Hansen; Ole Prip Hansen; Finn Heiberg; Lars Heiberg; Tove Hummel; Elisa Jensen; Jacob Jørgensen; Jens-Peter Kellermann; Pontus Kjerrman; Kirsten Klein; Leif Madsen; Anne Marie Mejlholm; Ulrik Møller	Anita Viola Nielsen; Egon Bjerg Nielsen; Hanne Sejrbo Nielsen; Mogens Nørgaard; Knud Odde; Cathie Pilkington; Anne Marie Ploug; Lene Rasmussen; Christian Schmidt-Rasmussen; Morten Skovmand; Hans Voigt Steffensen; Oddvar Torsheim; Tong Wang; Claus Ørntoft

== See also ==
- Art of Denmark
