= Sigurd Wandel =

Danish painter

Sigurd Wandel (22 February 1875 – 3 June 1947) was a Danish painter who became director of the Royal Danish Academy of Fine Arts.

== Biography ==
Wandel was born in the Frederiksberg district of Copenhagen, Denmark. He was the son of art collector Oscar Andreas Wandel (1845-1925) and painter Elisabeth Wandel (1850–1926). He was the nephew of naval officer and polar explorer Carl Frederick Wandel (1843–1930) .

He was a student of painting both with Kristian Zahrtmann and at the Royal Danish Academy of Fine Arts from 1895 to 1904. He also travelled with Zahrtmann to Italy in 1896 before spending a year at the Dresden Academy of Fine Arts (1896–97). Following closely in Zahrtmann's footsteps, at the beginning of the 20th century he painted a number of large groups of figures and interiors, mainly consisting of his artist friends and members of his family. His Figurgruppe, selvportræt med familien (Group of Figures, Self-Portrait with the Family), now in the Hirschsprung Collection, earned him the academy's Medal of the Year in 1908. He also produced a number of notable landscapes.

In 1920, he was selected to serve as professor at the Royal Danish Academy but this led to a strike by the students who found him too traditional. He nevertheless became a professor in 1920 and the director of the academy from 1940 to 1943.

== Awards ==
In 1910, Wandel was awarded the Eckersberg Medal.

== Literature ==
- Wandel, Sigurd (1947). Malede Kunstnerportrætter.
