= Ejnar Nielsen =

Danish painter and illustrator

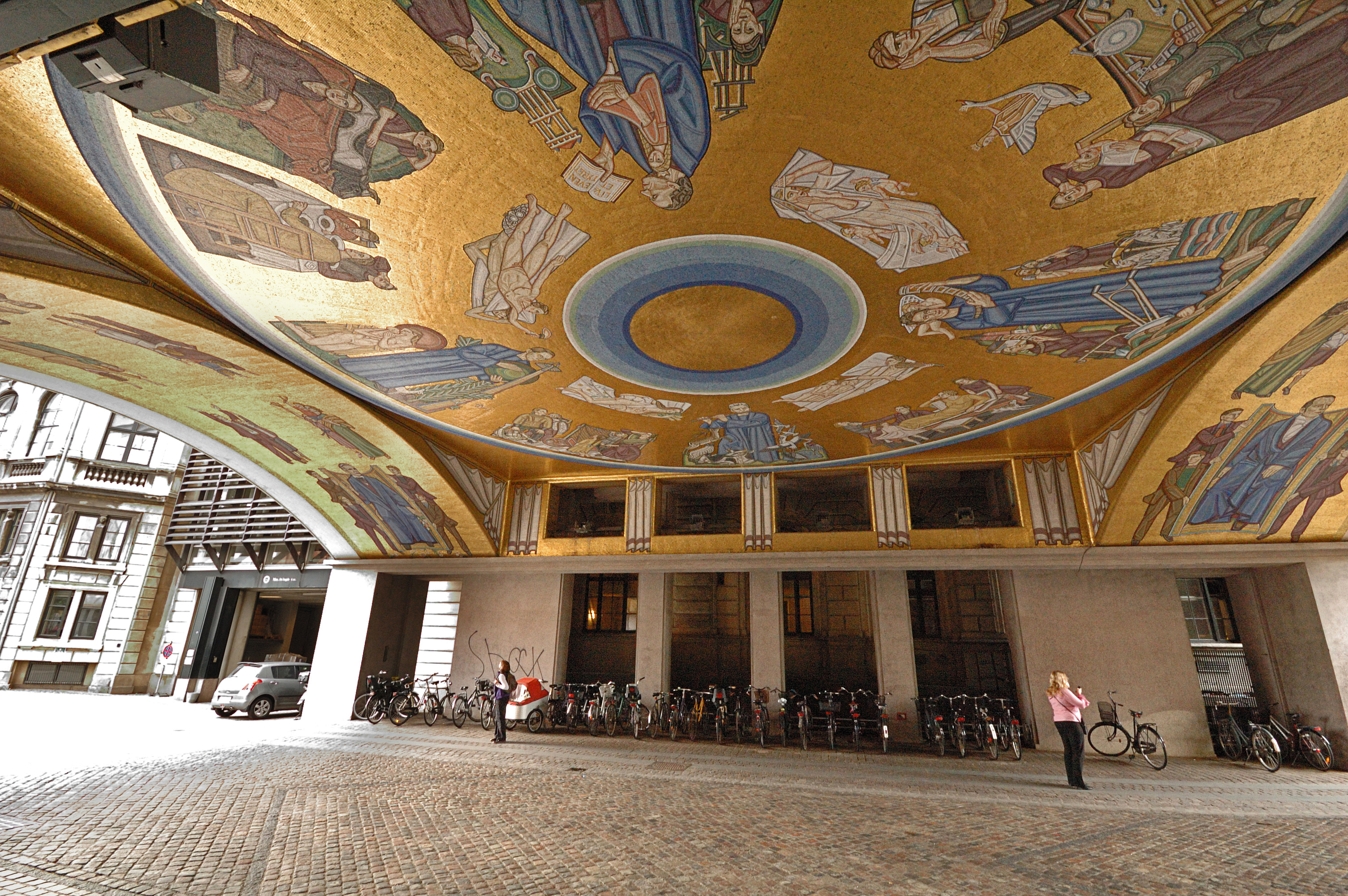
Mosaic in the arched passage at Stærekassen

Ejnar Nielsen (9 July 1872 – 21 July 1956) was a Danish painter and illustrator, who was a central proponent of Symbolist painting in Danish art. He is also known for his large mosaic on Stærekassen, an extension to the Royal Danish Theatre on Kongens Nytorv in Copenhagen. He was a professor at the Royal Danish Academy of Fine Arts from 1920 to 1930 and received the Academy's Eckersberg Medal in 1908 and its Thorvaldsen Medal in 1913.

== Biography ==
Ejnar Nielsen was born in Copenhagen. He was educated at the Royal Danish Academy of Fine Arts between 1889 and 93 and at Zahrtmann's Painting School from 1895 to 1896.

in 1894 he travelled to Gjern in central Jutland where he painted the people and undulating landscapes. During this period, he became established as a central proponent of symbolism in Danish art but after the turn of the century turned to a more classical expression. He also illustrated books such as Den gamle Mands Barn (Juleroser 1900, Vejen Kunstmuseum) and Ijobs Bog (træsnit, 1927). From 1932 to 1937, he executed the large mosaic in the ceiling of the arched passage underneath the stage tower of the Stærekassen extension to the Royal Danish Theatre on Kongens Nytorv in Copenhagen. Late in his career he mainly painted flowers and landscapes.

He died at Gentofte and was buried at Bispebjerg Cemetery.

== See also ==
- Art of Denmark
