= Aksel Jørgensen =

Danish painter

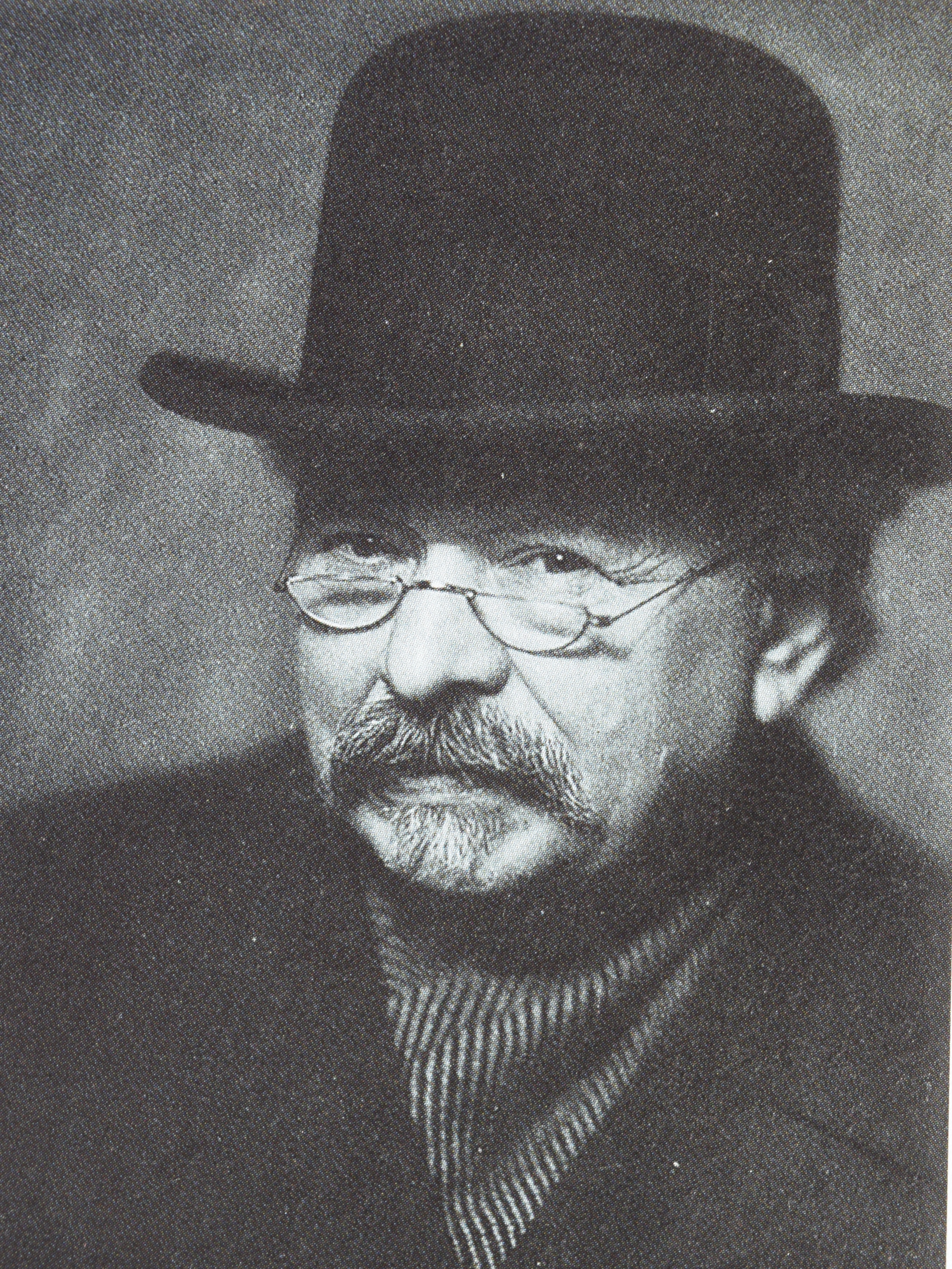

Aksel Jørgensen (3 February 1883 – 9 June 1957) was a Danish painter and wood engraver. He is also remembered for his years as the director and professor at the Royal Danish Academy where he instructed many Danish illustrators.

== Childhood ==
Aksel Jørgensen was born in Copenhagen. His parents were the mechanic Mathias Jørgensen and Maren née Christensen. Aksel later described his parents' home as very modest but harmonious. Like many working-class families of the time, the family lived in a very small space in a two-room apartment without sanitary facilities. At the age of four, Jørgensen became seriously ill with an otitis media, the long-term consequences of which affected his entire life. At the age of 12 he came to a family outside of the capital as a “holiday child”. A boy of the same age, whose father was a master painter, gave him a small wooden box with powder paints. Mixed with water, this was his first "watercolor box". He and his cousins put on magic shows in the attic of their parents' house. The money he earned was enough to buy his first real paint box.

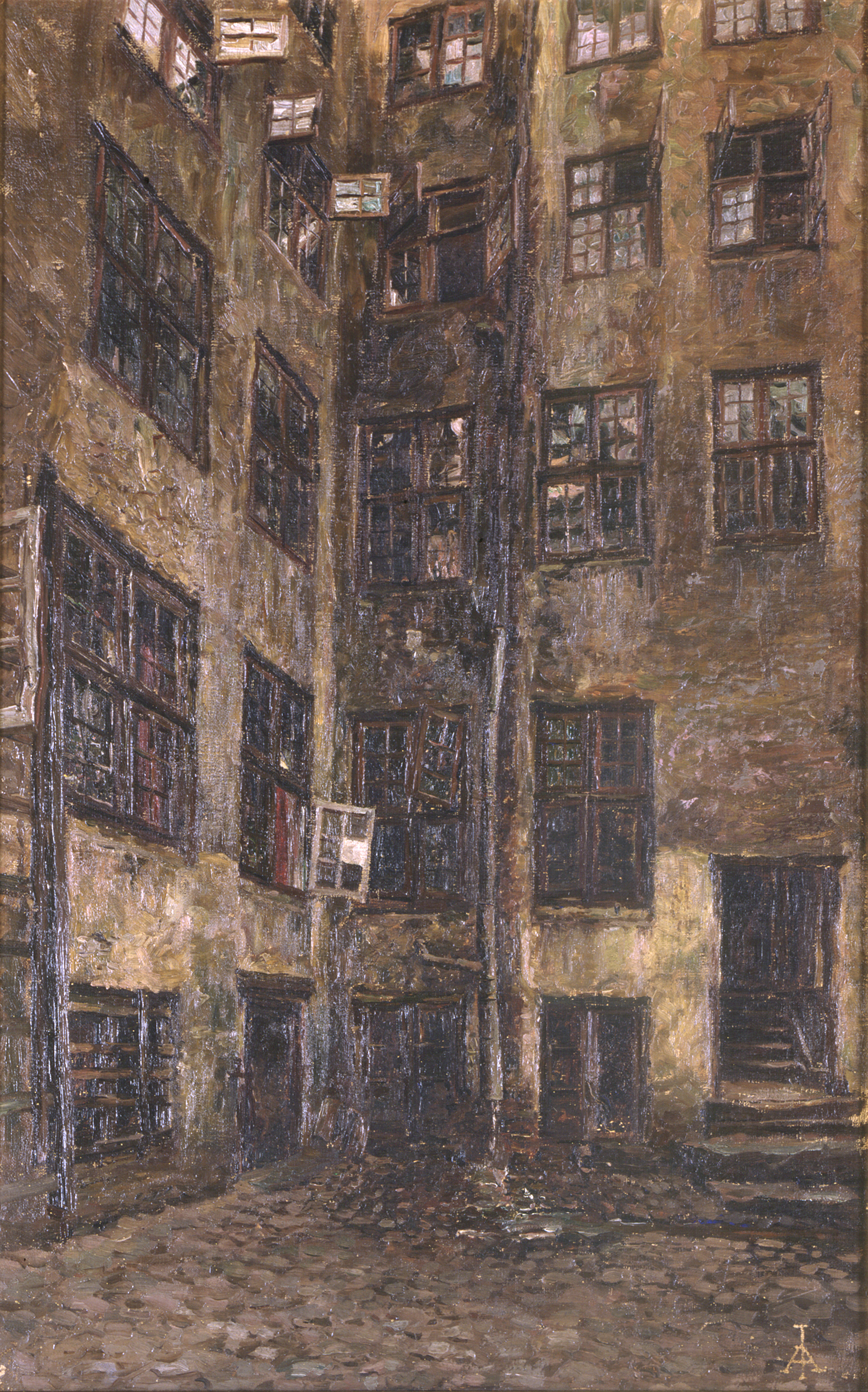
Udsigt over tagene på Gl. Mønt. 1907. Københavns Museum

At the age of 14 he finished school and began his apprenticeship as a master painter with his master Marcussen. The training included painting fences, windows and doors as well as classes at the technical society school, where he learned, among other things, decorative painting. As a journeyman painter, he continued to attend this drawing school in the evenings from 1901.

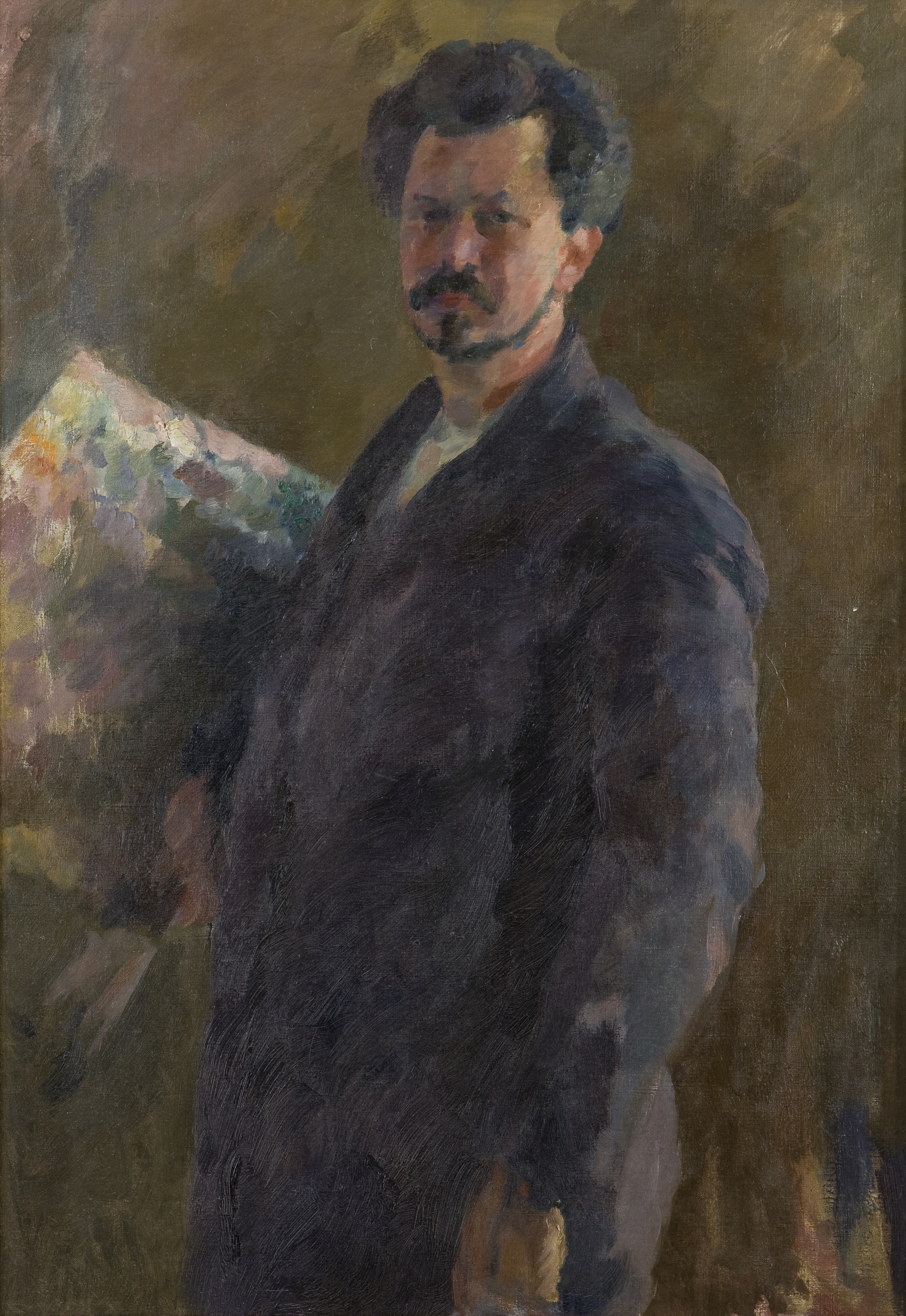
Self-portrait, ca. 1919, Trapholt Museum

== Early work 1905–1914 ==
In 1905, at the age of 22, Jørgensen went to a private drawing school, which he attended in the evenings after school. There he met an art dealer of the same age, Martin Grosell, who bought some of his paintings and promised to buy more works in the future. That evening, Jørgensen got another serious ear infection and had to have an operation. What remained was a slight paralysis of the facial muscles, which he concealed with his beard. During the weeks of illness, the decision matured to only live with, for and from art in the future, which he implemented after returning from the hospital against the will of his parents. During this time Jacob Hegel, director of the largest Danish publishing house Gyldendahl, commissioned Jørgensen to conduct milieu studies specifically for “Holmensgade”, a slum in the old town of Copenhagen. The paintings were created under the most primitive conditions without a studio of their own. Violence, prostitutes and alcohol were the order of the day there. At first, Jørgensen was viewed critically by the residents. Gradually, however, he was accepted and appreciated. During a dance event he met the flower binder Christine Carlsen; the two soon became a couple. She was a maid for the Senstius family of teachers and introduced them to her fiancé. Through his family he gained access to literature, music and many important personalities. The friendship with the family lasted a lifetime. Jørgensen made his debut at the free art exhibition "Den Frie Udstilling" in 1908. In 1909 he exhibited with "De Tretten", the artist group "The Thirteen", presenting his favorite subjects of prostitutes and destitute people living in demolished buildings in the poorest neighborhoods of Copenhagen, thereby attracting press attention. He is also known for his engravings, which are characterized by large areas of light and shadow and the use of wood grain, as in his portrait of the writer Jens Pedersen (1908). Jørgensen was a committed socialist himself. Together with Storm P. he founded the socially critical satirical magazine Gnisten (the spark) in 1908 and published some of his sketches. At the age of 26, the final breakthrough came at an exhibition in which he showed around 100 pictures. The works that followed were shaped by encounters with Edward Munch and Henrik Lund. From now on he worked more with the spatula. "The form, the contours are more important to me than the detail," he wrote in a letter. In 1909 Jørgensen met the innkeeper Lorry Feilberg. He had the idea of decorating his establishment in honor of the Danish poet Holger Drachmann with paintings that reproduce texts, themes and characters from Drachmann's works. In the midst of the works, Aksel and Christine married on October 9, 1910. Their daughter Rut was born on March 4, 1911. Although L. Feilberg paid an advance, it was difficult to feed his wife and child. In 1912 the famous Danish art collector and successful grain trader Christian Tetzen-Lund commissioned numerous works for the dining room of his villa. Jørgensen's early work is heavily influenced by impressionism. Inspired by his experiences with Cézanne. In September 1913, after almost four years, the restaurant "Drachmanns Kroen" finally opened and caused a stir. The following year there was a dispute between Feilberg and Jørgensen, who felt cheated of his wages. The conflict caused Jørgensen to have a nervous breakdown, fell into a deep four-year creative crisis and withdrew strongly. Tetzen-Lund helped the family by letting them live in his various houses on the coast and in Jutland. With the help of Tetzen-Lund, Jørgensen bought a house in Kongens Lyngby, a suburb of Copenhagen. Expressive self-portraits in particular were created during this period.

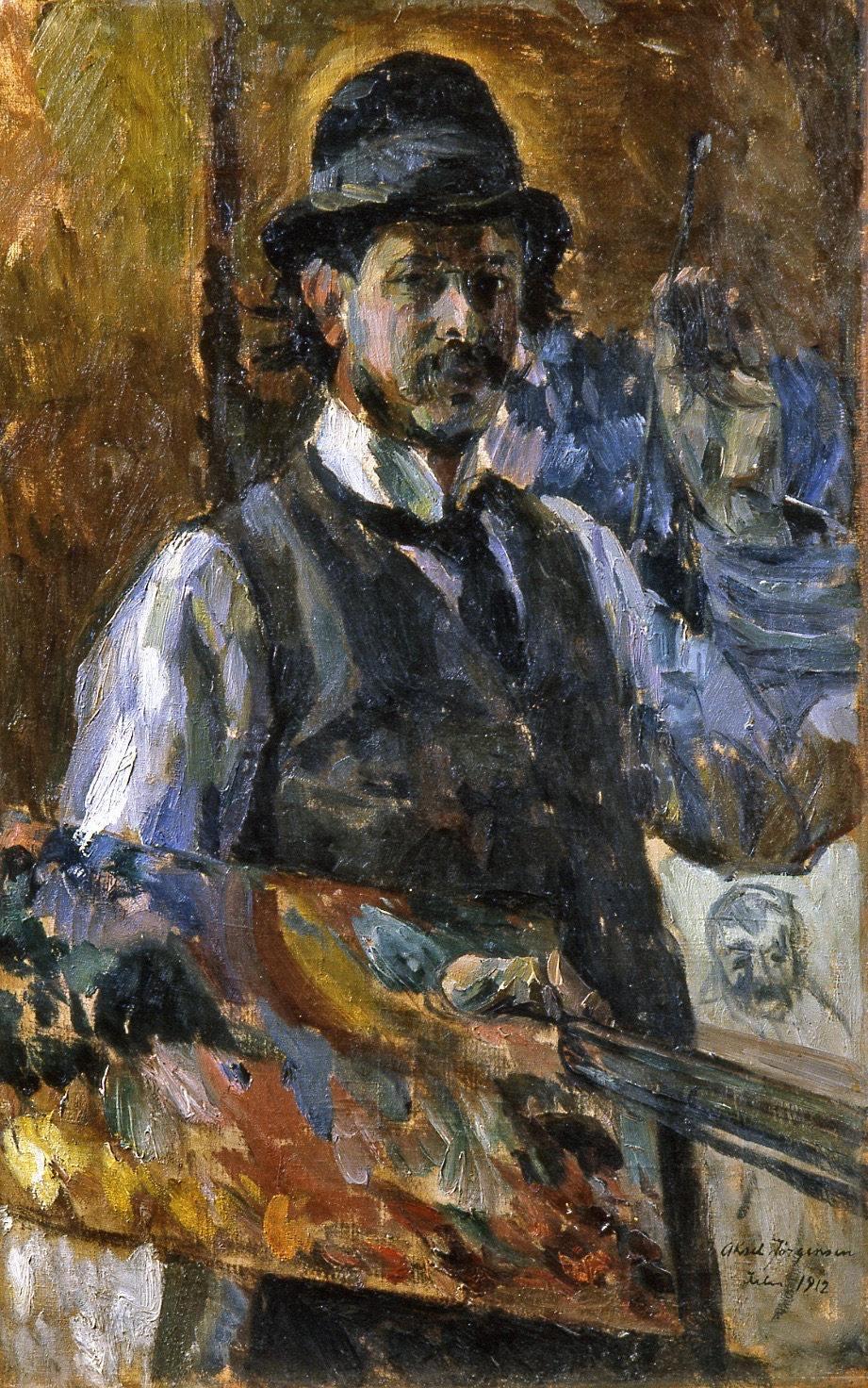
Self-portrait, 1912, Museum Jorn Silkeborg

== Late work and teaching 1920-1953 ==
In 1920, at the age of just 37, Jørgensen was appointed professor of painting at the Royal Art Academy in Copenhagen. He was the youngest professor and the only one with no academic or artistic training. During this period he focused on composition of color and perspective for the use of still life and figure paintings. His style of painting became more abstract and expressionistic. Important public works for the dormitory "Studentergården" (1921–23), the cinema "Vesterbros Bio" (1942) and the "Arbejdermuseet" (1955) were created. In 1930 he published works alongside Käthe Kollwitz, George Grosz and Hugo Gellert in his own edition of the art newspaper Social Kunst, published by Mondes Verlag. He made a large number of portraits, including that of the politician Frederik Borgbjerg (1949). In 1935 he became a member of "Den Frie Udstilling", an alternative exhibition forum.

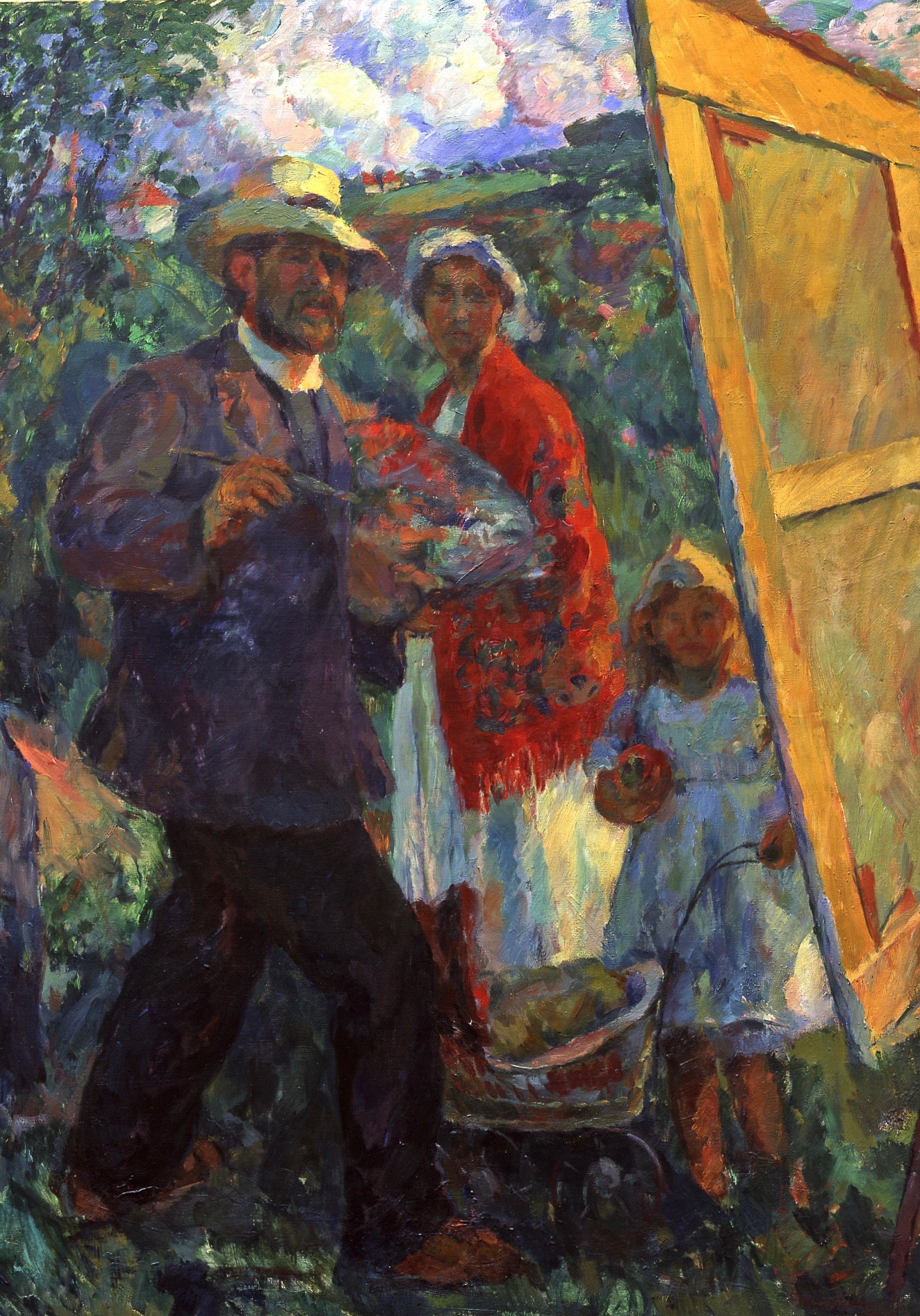
Family picture, 1914, Museum Jorn Silkeborg

Within the academy, Jørgensen, who now devoted himself heavily to graphics, established the College of Graphics. His most extensive project were around 50 illustrations for Adam Oehlenschläger's work Nordens Guder

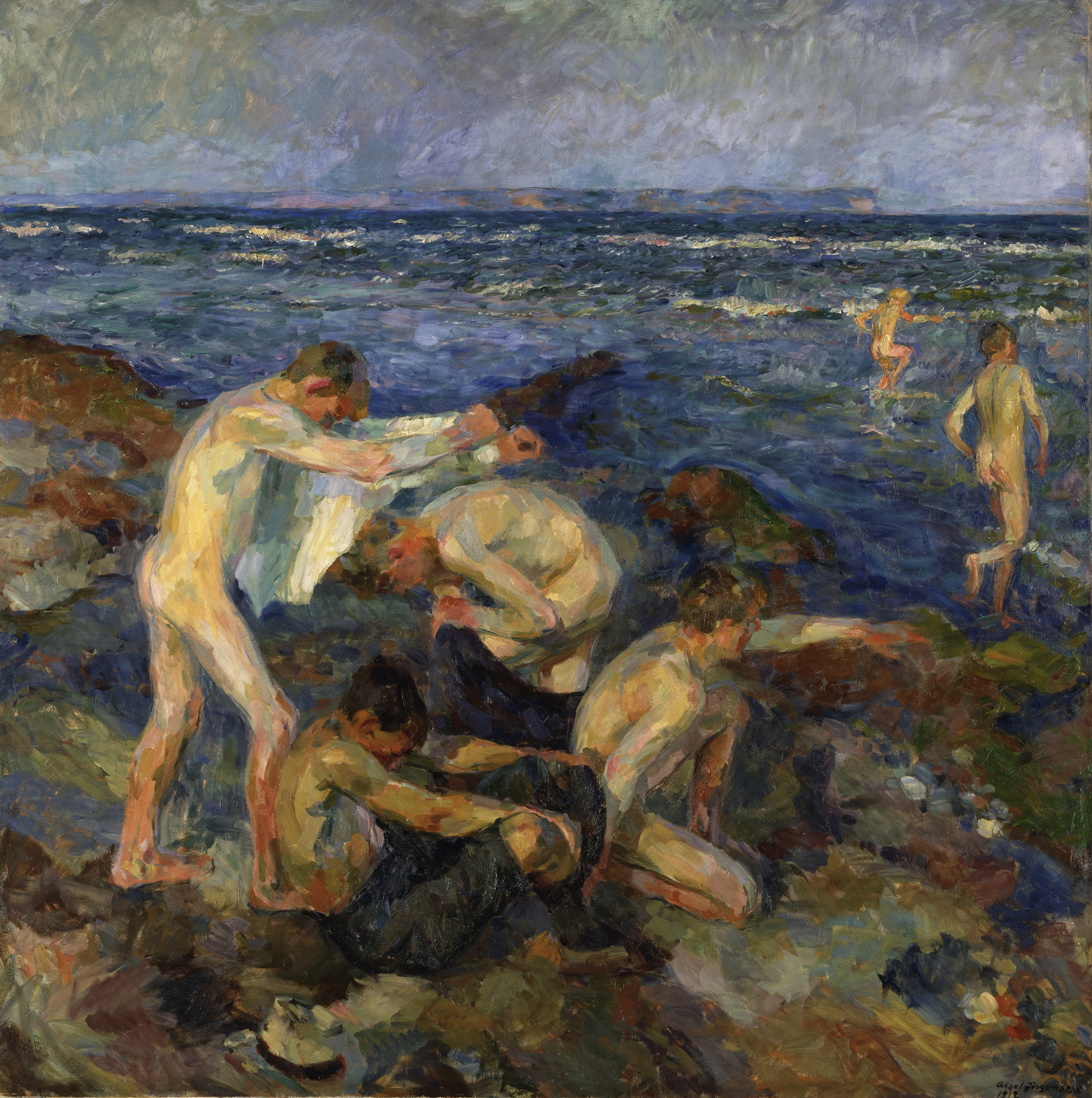
The bathing boys, 1908, Aksel Jørgensen, National Gallery Oslo

(Gods of the North), which he began in 1914 and completed in 1928. It took Jørgensen many years to engrave the woodcuts, in which several of his students participated. The work was viewed very divided by art critics. He received the greatest recognition from a letter from Paul Signac, who highly praised the work. Proofs of the large work (A3 format, 40 pages) were shown at the 1925 World Exhibition in Paris.In 1930, ten years after his appointment as professor, Jørgensen was unanimously elected director of the Academy. The family moved into their unusually spacious official residence in Charlottenborg Palace right next to the Royal Theater.

In his function as director of the academy, Jørgensen met the leading painters of the 20th century, such as Franz Marc, Paul Klee, Otto Dix and Emil Nolde along with his Danish wife Ada. He also met the Indian poet R. Tagore. On his 70th birthday in 1953, the father of the Danish Queen Margaret II made him "Knight of Dannebrog". After 33 years, his work at the academy ended. In 1955 Jørgensen was asked to create a large museum for his late fellow painter and friend J.F. Willumsen, which opened in 1957 and of which he became museum director. On June 9, 1957, Jørgensen suffered a heart attack and died at the age of 74.

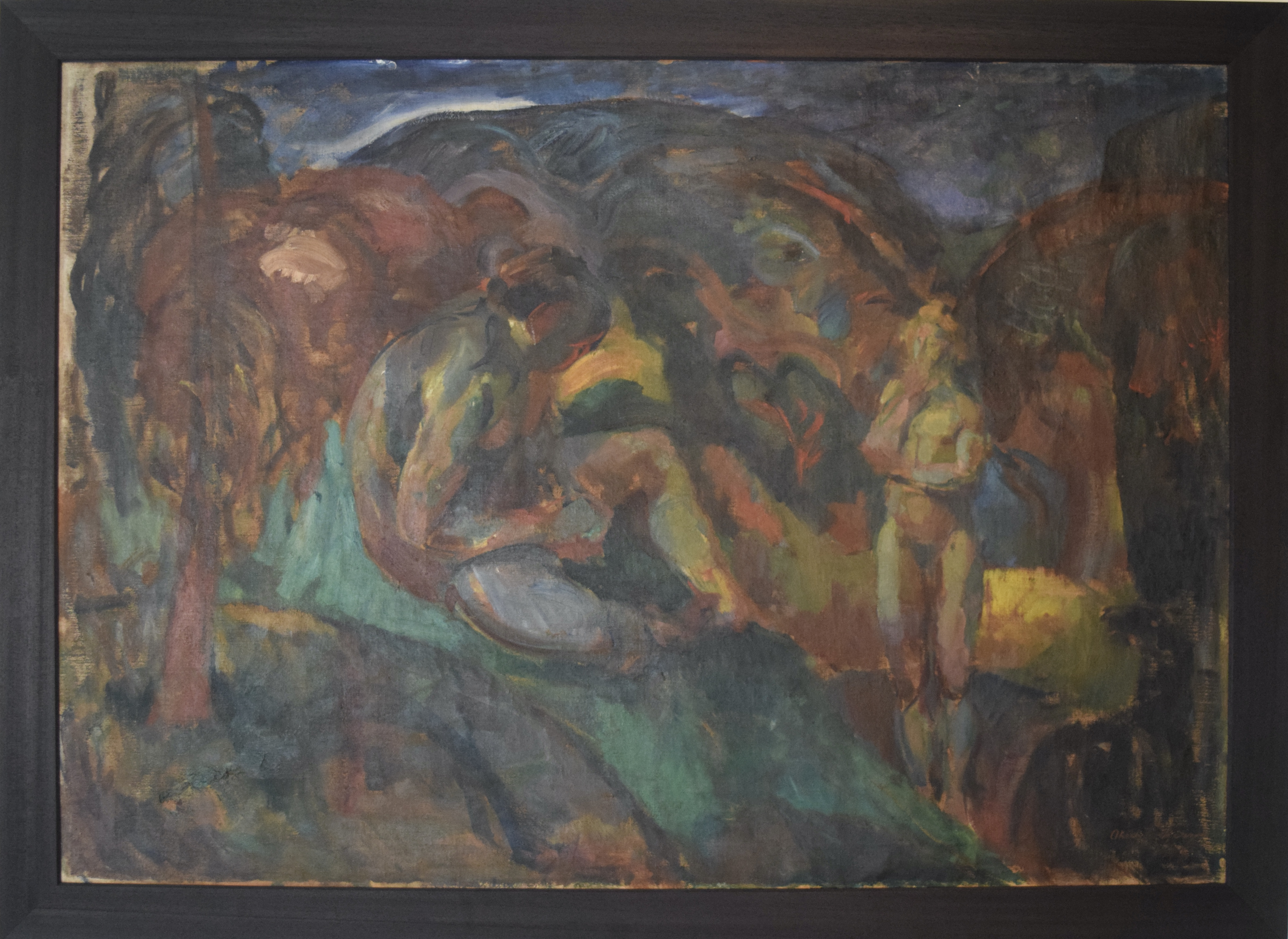
Loke og Jaette, 1913, private collection Germany

== Teaching career ==
In 1920 Jørgensen was offered a professorship at the Royal Danish Academy of Arts. He held this position until 1953. In the year of his appointment, Jørgensen established the graphic school within the academy. He encouraged his students to observe trends across Europe and emphasized the importance of lines and geometric figures. He was therefore of the opinion that nature is built up from a strictly formal, geometric system.[9] Special attention was therefore paid to the composition of perspectives of nature. Jørgensen was also an unorthodox teacher who avoided the complex admissions process at the academy early on and accepted applicants as students based on the work submitted to him. The only requirement was a high school diploma. The students were both models and helpers with the work that had to be done in the studio.Jørgensen was a lifelong socialist and advocate of general art, not just the beautiful. Art should therefore reflect reality unfiltered, i.e. without a veil. This attitude also significantly determined his teaching.

"Jeg ønsker ingen gardiner mellem mig og tilværelsen"

"I don't want curtains between me and life." (Aksel Jørgensen)

He also organized traveling exhibitions for Danish schools. The art historian Elisabeth Laur concludes that it is Jørgensen's teaching and school that significantly established graphic arts in Denmark from the 1920s. Dagmar Warming, museum director at Ribe Kunstmuseum, describes Aksel Jørgensen as a "central figure in Danish art, and his graphic work as an epoch-making work". Jørgensen's students included artists and graphic artists such as Henry Heerup, Ib Spang Olsen, Richard Mortensen, Frede Christoffersen, Samal Joensen-Mikines and Asger Jorn. During his early phase in particular, he produced many high-contrast, expressive and socially critical woodcuts. Here, too, Jørgensen repeatedly took up motifs from the poor district of Holmensgade in Copenhagen, about which he also made many oil paintings at the same time. As in his works in oils, Jørgensen's early work is characterized by numerous portraits of important people in Denmark in the early 20th century. The graphic works are of the highest quality and only appeared in very small editions.

== Assessment ==
Jørgensen played an important role in developing the status of graphical work in Denmark. It was he who took the initiative to integrate the graphics school as part of the Royal Danish Academy of Fine Arts and it was his work there which attracted important illustrators such as Henry Heerup, Richard Mortensen, Ib Spang Olsen, and many others. His graphical work is notable both technically and artistically.

== Museum inventory ==
Jørgensen's works are in the possession of a large number of Danish and international museums. With around 100 works, the largest collection of paintings, woodcuts and drawings is in Museum Jorn in Silkeborg, museum of the painter Anger Jorn, who was a student of Jørgensen. The Museum Jorn also houses an Aksel Jørgensen archive with numerous sketches, photographs and numerous correspondence. The collection was significantly expanded through the purchase of works by the museum director Troels Andersen. The Skagens Museum has another large collection. Many of the works were donated by the art collector Christian Tetzen-Lund.

-Skagen's Museum

-National Gallery Oslo

-The British Museum

-Kunsthalle Kiel

-State Art Museum Copenhagen

-National Museum Stockholm

-Trapholt Museum

== Literature ==
- Andersen, Troels; Jørgensen, Aksel (2002). Aksel Jørgensen: liv og kunst (in Danish). Borgen. ISBN 978-87-21-02026-2.
