= Dorte Dahlin =

Danish artist (born 1955)

Dorte Dahlin (born 1955) is a Danish artist who entered the art scene in the early 1980s as part of the Wild Youth trend. She gained recognition from her participation in the 1982 exhibition Kniven på hovedet (Knife on the Head) held at Tranegården in Gentofte. More recently, she has created decorative objects for churches.

== Biography ==
Born in Copenhagen on 13 December 1955, Dahlin is the daughter of the physician Edgar Frankovitch Dahlin and Birte Hauge Andersen, a histology technician. She studied at the Royal Danish Academy of Fine Arts (1978–84) under Sven Dalsgaard, Freddie A. Lerche and Hein Heinsen.

Dahlin first collaborated with the other Wild Youth artists, creating dynamic, expressive works but in the mid-1980s, she became interested in experimenting with shifts in perspective. Her 1988 work I forgot to Remember to Forget draws on traditional Chinese painting which is free of perspective. Inspired by an exhibition of Chinese art in Hamburg, it employs a split-level approach conveying an impression of a static, unbalanced entity, suitable for meditation. Several of her works up to the early 1990s achieve abstractness through large monochrome surfaces of varied strengths in which there are almost identical objects, providing the viewer with confusion as his gaze wanders around in the absence of fixed points.

Most recently Dahlin has moved away from painting to sculptural objects such as the stone door in the Abbey Church in Aalborg (2012), consisting of 30 square sections of rose quartz held together by a metal lattice.

In 2002, Dahlin was awarded the Tagea Brandt Travel Scholarship. Her work can be seen at Statens Museum for Kunst, the ARoS art museum in Aarhus, and the Esbjerg Art Museum.
