= Thorvaldsen Medal =

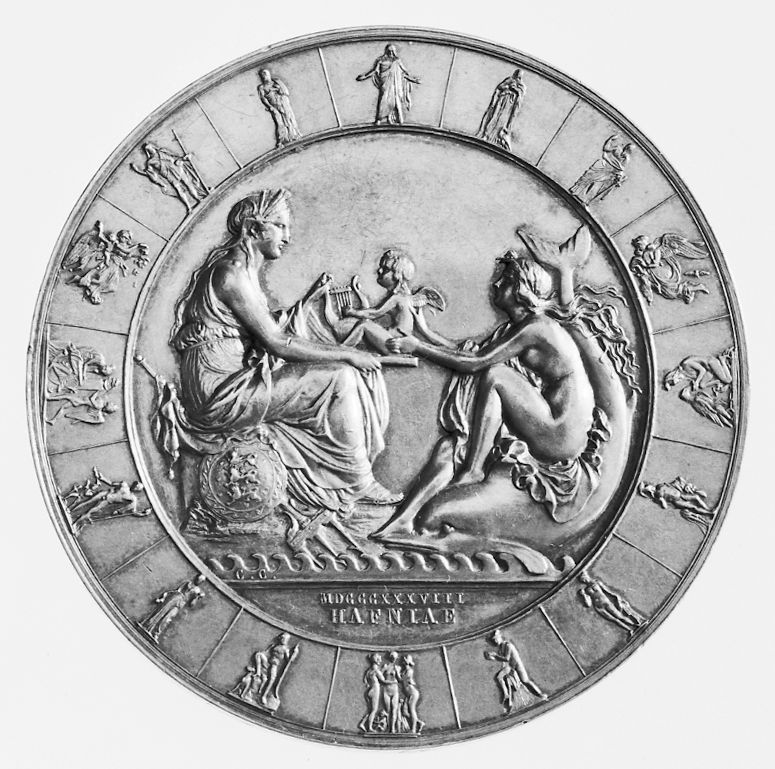
- An Exhibition Medal made of gold was presented to Bertel Thorvaldsen in 1842.
- Sponsored by: Royal Danish Academy of Fine Arts
- Date: 1837; 189 years ago
- Country: Denmark
- Formerly called: Exhibition Medal (1837–1865); Thorvaldsen Exhibition Medal (1866–1023)
- Website: https://www.akademiraadet.dk/index.php?id=95

The Thorvaldsen Medal (Danish: Thorvaldsens Medalje, Thorvaldsen Medaillen) is awarded annually with few exceptions to a varying number of recipients by the Royal Danish Academy of Fine Arts and is its highest distinction within the visual arts. It is named after the sculptor Bertel Thorvaldsen.

The medal was founded in 1837 as the Exhibition Medal and awarded for talented works in the Charlottenborg Spring Exhibition in the Charlottenborg Palace. In 1866, it was renamed the Thorvaldsen Exhibition Medal (Danish: Thorvaldsenske Udstillings-Medaille), and from 1923 it has been known under its current name.

== Medal design ==
The medal is executed in silver and designed by the sculptor Christen Christensen (1806–1845) in connection with Thorvaldsen's homecoming from Rome in 1838.

== Recipients ==
=== Exhibition Medal recipients ===
Year	Laureate	Winning work	Ref(s)
1839	Martinus Rørbye	A Turkish notary drawing up a marriage contract in front of the Kiliç Ali Pasha Mosque, Tophane, Constantinople	
1841	Wilhelm Marstrand	Scene of the October celebrations in Rome (Scene af oktoberfesten i Rom)	
1842	Bertel Thorvaldsen	Honorary medal	
1843	Johan Vilhelm Gertner	Stiftsprovst Trydes Portræt	Source
1845	P. C. Skovgaard	Scene from Tisvilde Woods (Parti ved Udkanten af Tisvilde Skov)	
1845	P. C. Skovgaard	View of Skarrit Lake (Udsigt over Skarrit Sø)	
1846	Anton Melbye	Eddystone Lighthouse (Eddystone Fyrtaarn)	
1847	Jens Adolf Jerichau		
1849	Godtfred Rump	Scene from Himmelbjerget (Parti fra Himmelbjerget)	
1853	Julius Exner	Visiting Grandfather ("Besøget gos bedstefar")	
1858	Elisabeth Jerichau Baumann		
1860	Frederik Vermehren	Huslig Syssel i en fattig Bondestue; en Kone bælger Ærter	
1860	William Hammer	Grain and fruits under an apple tree ("Korn og Fruget under et Æbletræ")	Source
1860	Theobald Stein	Neapolitan fishing boy, carrying a pitcher("Neapolitansk Fiskerdreng, bærende en Vandkrukke")	
1861	Christen Dalsgaard	(En Kones højtidelige Kirkegang efter Barselfærd)	
1864	Carl Bloch	En romersk gadebarber	

=== Thorvaldsen Exhibition Medal recipients ===
Year	Laureate	Winning work		Ref(s)
1867	Carl Neumann		Skibe under land efter en byge	
1871	Janus la Cour		Aften ved Nemisøen	
1872	Otto Bache		Portrait group of the Ræder family (Portrætgruppe af Familien Ræder)	
1882	Vilhelm Rosenstand		Outside a Brasserie in Paris. Mother and Son at Café Pousse (Udenfor et Brasserie i Paris. Moder og Søn ved Pousse-Caféen)	
1882	Peder Severin Krøyer		?	
1882	Frants Henningsen		A Funeral (En Begravelse)	
1883	Thorvald Niss		Winter Scene from Folehaven	
1883	Bertha Wegmann		Portrait of the Artist's Sister (Portræt af kunstnerindens søster)	
1884	August Jerndorff			
1884	Christian Zacho		Quiet waters in Dyrehaven (Et stille Vand i Dyrehaven)	Source
1886	Viggo Johansen		Evening talk (Aftenpassiar )	
1887	Otto Haslund		Concerto (Koncert)	Source
1887	Hans Michael Therkildsen		Køerne vandes	
1888	Carl Thomsen		Middag i en Præstegaard efter en Bispevisitats	
1890	Georg Achen		Johanne Achen. The Artist's Mother (Johanne Achen, kunstnerens Moder)	
1893	Julius Paulsen		Portrait of a Lady	
1896	Michael Ancher		?	
1899	Ludvig Brandstrup		Christian IX statue, Esbjerg	
1901	Knud Larsen			
1906	L. A. Ring		?	
1907	Bertha Dorph		Et besøg hos den unge barselskone	
1913	Ejnar Nielsen		?	
1915	Theodor Philipsen		?	
1918	Herman Vedel		Fra forhandlingerne om grundloven 5. juni 1915	
Wilhelm Tetens		Portrait of P.T. Foldberg	-	
1923	Joakim Skovgaard		Jomfru i Fugleham	

=== Thorvaldsen Medal recipients ===
Year	Recipient	Field
1926	Karl Jensen	Painter
1927	Fritz Syberg	Painter
1930	Carl J. Bonnesen	Sculptor
1932	Anne Marie Carl-Nielsen	Sculptor
1933	Niels Larsen Stevns	Painter
1934	Johan Rohde	Painter
1936	Niels Hansen Jacobsen	Sculptor
1937	Niels Skovgaard; Gerhard Henning	Sculptor; Sculptor
1940	Sigurd Swane; Mogens Bøggild	Painter; Sculptor
1941	Johannes Larsen; Aksel Jørgensen	Painter; Painter
1942	Olaf Rude	Painter
1943	Oluf Høst	Painter
1944	Einar Utzon-Frank; Johannes C. Bjerg; Hans Knudsen; Svend Hammershøi	Sculptor; Sculptor; Painter; Painter
1946	Jens Søndergaard; Axel P. Jensen	Painter; Painter
1948	Rasmus Harboe; Jais Nielsen	Sculptor; Painter
1950	Jean Gauguin; Adam Fischer	Sculptor; Sculptor
1951	Ebba Carstensen	Painter
1952	Elof Risebye; Ole Søndergaard	Painter; Architect
1954	Astrid Noack	Sculptor
1956	Laura Brun-Pedersen	Painter
1957	William Scharff	Painter
1960	Henrik Starcke	Sculptor
1961	Erik Hoppe	Painter
1963	Carl-Henning Pedersen; Palle Nielsen; Axel Poulsen	Painter; Painter; Sculptor
1964	Georg Jacobsen	Painter
1965	Niels Lergaard; Jørgen Gudmundsen-Holmgreen	Painter; Sculptor
1966	Harald Leth; Svend Johansen	Painter; Painter
1967	Henry Heerup; Lauritz Hartz; Robert Jacobsen	Painter; Painter; Sculptor
1968	Richard Mortensen; Povl Christensen; Knud Nellemose	Painter; Painter; Sculptor
1969	Ejler Bille; Paul Gadegaard	Painter; Painter
1970	Wilhelm Freddie	Painter
1971	Knud Agger; Peter Alsing Nielsen; Sonja Ferlov Mancoba	Painter; Painter; Sculptor
1972	Søren Hjorth Nielsen; Erik Thommesen	Painter; Sculptor
1973	Karl Bovin; Else Alfelt; Willy Ørskov	Painter; Painter; Sculptor
1974	Søren Georg Jensen	Painter
1975	Gunnar Westman	Sculptor
1976	Anna Klindt Sørensen; Gottfred Eickhoff	Painter; Sculptor
1977	Franciska Clausen; Bent Sørensen	Painter; Sculptor
1978	Sven Dalsgaard; Ole Schwalbe; Ole Kielberg	Painter; Painter; Painter
1979	Jørgen Haugen Sørensen; Dan Sterup-Hansen	Sculptor; Painter
1980	Gunnar Aagaard Andersen	Painter
1983	Kasper Heiberg	Painter
1984	Arne Haugen Sørensen; Mogens Andersen; Jane Muus	Painter; Painter; Painter
1985	Ib Braase	Sculptor
1986	Frede Christoffersen; Else Fischer-Hansen; Rasmus Nellemann	Painter; Painter; Painter
1987	Per Kirkeby	Painter
1988	Albert Mertz	Painter
1989	Jørn Larsen	Painter
1990	Christian Daugaard	Painter
1991	Ib Geertsen	Painter
1982	Hein Heinsen; Egon Fischer	Sculptor; Sculptor
1994	Mogens Møller	Sculptor
1995	Sven Havsteen-Mikkelsen	Painter
1996	Bjørn Nørgaard	Sculptor
1997	John Olsen; Richard Winther	Painter; Painter
1998	Stig Brøgger	Painter
1999	Torben Ebbesen; Jørgen Boberg	Sculptor; Painter
2000	Thomas Bang; Kirsten Lockenwitz; Ingálvur av Reyni	Sculptor; Sculptor; Painter
2001	Ole Sporring	Painter
2002	Kirsten Ortwed	Sculptor
2003	Ingvar Cronhammar	Sculptor
2004	Troels Wörsel	Painter
2005	Kirsten Justesen; Jytte Rex	Sculptor; Painter
2006	Jørgen Rømer	Painter
2008	Erik Hagens	Painter
2009	Christian Lemmerz	Sculptor
2010	Morten Stræde; Elisabeth Toubro	Sculptor; Sculptor
2011	Eva Koch; Freddie A. Lerche	Sculptor; Painter
2012	Kirsten Klein	Photographer
2013	Olafur Eliasson; Kirsten Dehlholm	Painter; Painter
2014	Martin Erik Andersen	Sculptor
2015	Per Bak Jensen; Viera Collaro	Photographer; Sculptor
2016	Jesper Christiansen; Erik August Frandsen; Jytte Høy	Visual artist Painter; Visual artist
2017	Finn Reinbothe	Visual artist
2018	Lone Høyer Hansen	Sculptor
2019	Eric Andersen	Visual artist
2020	Poul Pedersen	Visual artist

== See also ==
- Art of Denmark
- C. F. Hansen Medal
- Eckersberg Medal
- List of European art awards
- Prizes named after people
