= Ole Sporring =

Danish painter and illustrator

Ole Hofman Sporring (born 24 April 1941) is a Danish painter and illustrator who develops social and ecological themes in his graphic prints and paintings.

== Biography ==
Born in Frederiksberg, Sporring studied at the graphic and paintings schools of the Royal Danish Academy of Fine Arts from 1961 to 1965 under Dan Sterup-Hansen and Egill Jacobsen. He developed his own figurative approach, building on the work of Palle Nielsen and Svend Wiig Hansen, producing drawings enhanced by several layers of colour. Sporring also worked on comic strips including Lille Vov from the end of the 1960s He decorated the Næshøjskolen in Harlev with 28 sculptures and paintings.

In addition to his exquisitely colourful, often humorous prints, Sporring has been an effective advocate of more democracy and less bureaucracy in art institutions. He has also shown concern for the effects of climate change on the environment.

Sporring was a professor at the Royal Danish Academy from 1700 to 1995.

== Awards ==
In 1983, Sporring was awarded the Eckersberg Medal and, in 2001, the Thorvaldsen Medal.
