= Eva Koch =

Danish sculptor

Eva Isabel Koch (born 17 June 1953) is a Danish sculptor who has gained fame with her video installations. In 2011, she was awarded the Thorvaldsen Medal.

== Description ==
Born in the Frederiksberg district of Copenhagen, Koch was the daughter of Jens Koch, a justice ministry official and later judge and of interior decorator Chris Haslunc Gleditsch. She studied at the Royal Danish Academy of Fine Arts under Freddie A. Lerche, Mogens Møller, Hein Heinsen and Bjørn Nørgaard from 1985 to 1992. From 1989 to 1990, she also spent a year at the Facultad de Bellas Artes (Faculty of Fine Arts) in Barcelona.

From the 1980s, she experimented by sculpting blocks made of various composite materials as well as works in lead and phosphorus. In 1988, she began creating installations, sometimes with claustrophobic effects as at her exhibition in Sophienholm in 1989 when a cylinder cased in rubber was considered to be close to blowing up the room. In 1991, she created her Video Sculpture in Barcelona while her more recent works include installations expressing structures and frameworks.

Although Koch was originally trained as a sculptor, she is equally at home with other media including sound and light. She was the creator of Denmark's largest sculpture, Lyshøjen, in Esbjerg created from 1994 to 2001 together with the landscape architect Steen Høyer. In 2003, she presented her Villar video exhibit at the Venice Biennale which told the story of a child from Spain adopted by a Norwegian family with images up to two metres (six feet) high. Through her videos, Koch presents ordinary people who create a close relationship with the viewer.

== Awards ==
In 2003, Koch received the Eckersberg Medal and in 2011, the Thorvaldsen Medal.
