= Jytte Rex =

Danish artist, writer and film director (born 1942)

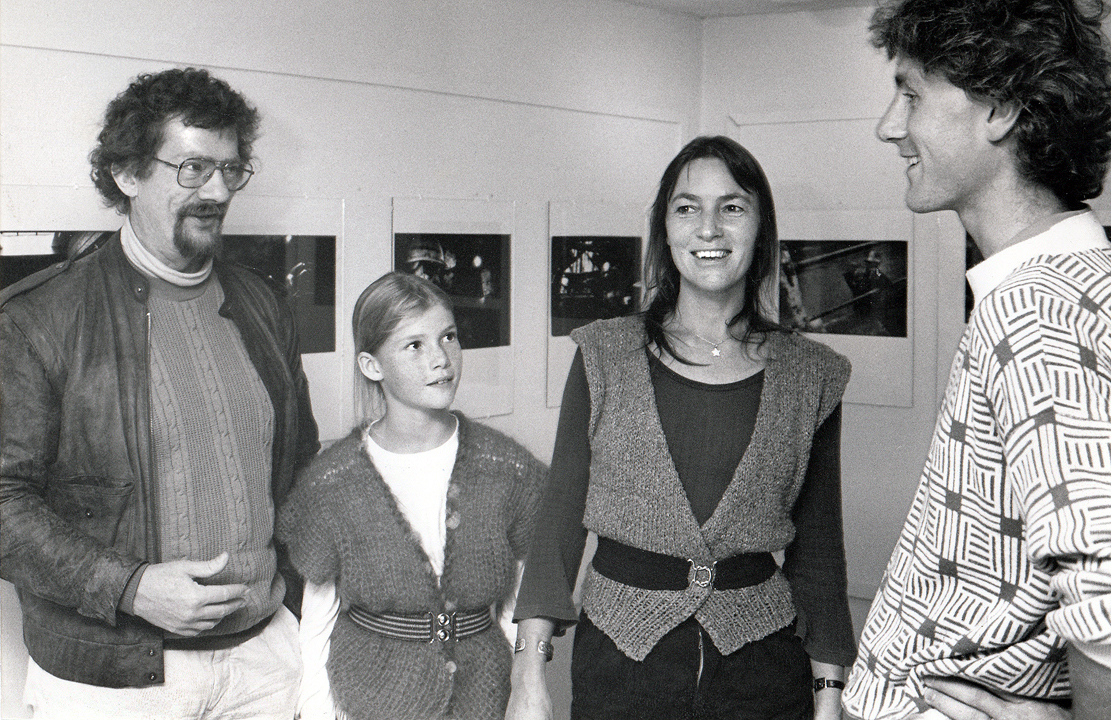
Jytte Rex with her daughter Rosemaria and her husband Christian Braad Thomsen photographed in 1986

Jytte Rex (born 19 March 1942) is a Danish artist, writer and film director. Her work includes paintings, fiction, biographies, and pioneering artistic activities in support of women's rights.

== Biography ==
Born in Frederiksberg, after qualifying as a multilingual correspondent in 1962, Rex studied painting at the Royal Danish Academy of Fine Arts from 1963 to 1969. At the end of the 1970s, together with other female artists, she gave a political slant to her work, arranging pioneering exhibitions, actions and happenings in support of women's rights. Her artwork covers a range of techniques from pen and ink drawings in the 1960s, pointed brush works in the 1970s, acrylics in the 1980s and since the 1990s, graphic art combining painting, photography and objects.

She has also published books on the subject of feminism including Kvindernes bog (Women's Book, 1972) in which women describe their lives and dreams, and the film Tornerose var et vakkert barn (Sleeping Beauty was a Good Girl, 1972) which reveals what women long for. Another film, Achilleshælen er mit våben (Achilles Heel is My Weapon, 1972), presents the rituals of a woman's life as well as the sensuality attached to everyday objects. Her novel Jeg har ikke lukket et øje (I Haven't Shut an Eye, 1978) is made up of poems, photographs and theatrical sketches. Both her films and her paintings reveal an erotic force together with a sense of power for overcoming death. Rex has also illustrated books, including those of the Spanish author Federico García Lorca.

Her feature films Belladonna (1981), Isolde (1989) and Planetens spejle (The Planet's Mirror, 1992) are a combination of narrative, myths and dreams. Later films present biographies of the poet Inger Christensen (in Cikaderne findes, 1998), the graphic artist Palle Nielsen (2002) and the composer Pelle Gudmundsen-Holmgreen (2007).

Rex' works have been presented in many group exhibitions as well as in solo exhibitions, especially at Clausens Kunsthandel. In 2013, Sophienholm presented a comprehensive solo exhibition Jytte Rex: Skillelinjer.

== Awards ==
In 1998, Rex was awarded the Eckersberg Medal and, in 2005, the Thorvaldsen Medal. In 1985, she received a Bodil Award for her short film Den erindrende.

== Literature ==
- Jytte Rex - skillelinjer. Lyngby-Taarbæk Kommune. ISBN 978-87-92079-14-5.
