= Commemorative coins of Denmark =

Commemorative coins have been issued by the Royal Danish Mint in Denmark since 1848.

== Coins issued from the Royal Danish Mint from 1848 to 1972 ==
=== Specie Daler ===
28.8930 grams .875 silver 25.28 grams (0.892 oz) ASW 38 millimetres (1.5 in). in diameter

- 1848 - Death of King Christian VIII, accession of King Frederik VII

=== 2 Rigsdaler ===
28.8930 grams .875 silver 25.28 grams (0.892 oz) ASW 38 millimetres (1.5 in). in diameter

- 1863 - Death of King Frederik VII, accession of King Christian IX

=== 2 Kroner ===
15.0000 grams .800 silver 12.00 grams (0.423 oz) ASW 31 millimetres (1.2 in). in diameter

- 1888 - 25th anniversary of reign, King Christian IX
- 1892 - 50th wedding anniversary of King Christian IX & Queen Louise
- 1903 - 40th anniversary of reign, King Christian IX
- 1906 - Death of King Christian IX, accession of King Frederik VIII
- 1912 - Death of Frederik VIII, accession of King Christian X
- 1923 - 25th wedding anniversary of King Christian X & Queen Alexandrine
- 1930 - 60th birthday of King Christian X
- 1937 - 25th anniversary of accession of King Christian X
- 1945 - 75th birthday of King Christian X
- 1953 - Greenland
- 1958 - 18th birthday of Crown Princess Margrethe

The above were also struck in medallic form and can be distinguished from their coin issues as they do not contain a kroner denomination.

=== 5 Kroner ===
17.0000 grams .800 silver 13.6 grams (0.48 oz) ASW 34 millimetres (1.3 in). in diameter

- 1960 - 25th wedding anniversary of King Frederik IX & Queen Ingrid
- 1964 - Wedding of Princess Anne Marie 18 September 1964

The above were also struck in medallic form and can be distinguished from their coin issues as they do not contain a kroner denomination.

=== 10 Kroner ===
20.0000 grams .800 silver 16.00 grams (0.564 oz) ASW 36 millimetres (1.4 in). in diameter

- 1967 - Wedding of Crown Princess Margrethe & Henri de Laborde de Monpezat
- 1968 - Wedding of Princess Benedicte
- 1972 - Death of King Frederik IX, accession of Queen Margrethe II 14 January

The above were also struck in medallic form and can be distinguished from their coin issues as they do not contain a kroner denomination.

== Coins issued from the Royal Danish Mint from 1986 to the present ==
=== Ships series ===
==== 500 Kroner ====
31.1035 grams .999 silver 31.10 grams ASW 38 mm in diameter.

- 2008 - "The Dannebrog" Royal Yacht

The above coin also included a 20 Kroner coin of the same design struck in aluminum-bronze released for circulation and issued as a proof strike in limited quantity.

=== Royal Occasions ===
==== 200 Kroner ====
31.1035 grams .800 silver 24.88 grams ASW 38 mm. in diameter

- 1990 - 50th Birthday of Queen Margrethe II

The above coin also included a 20 Kroner coin of the same design struck in aluminum-bronze released for circulation.

==== 200 Kroner ====
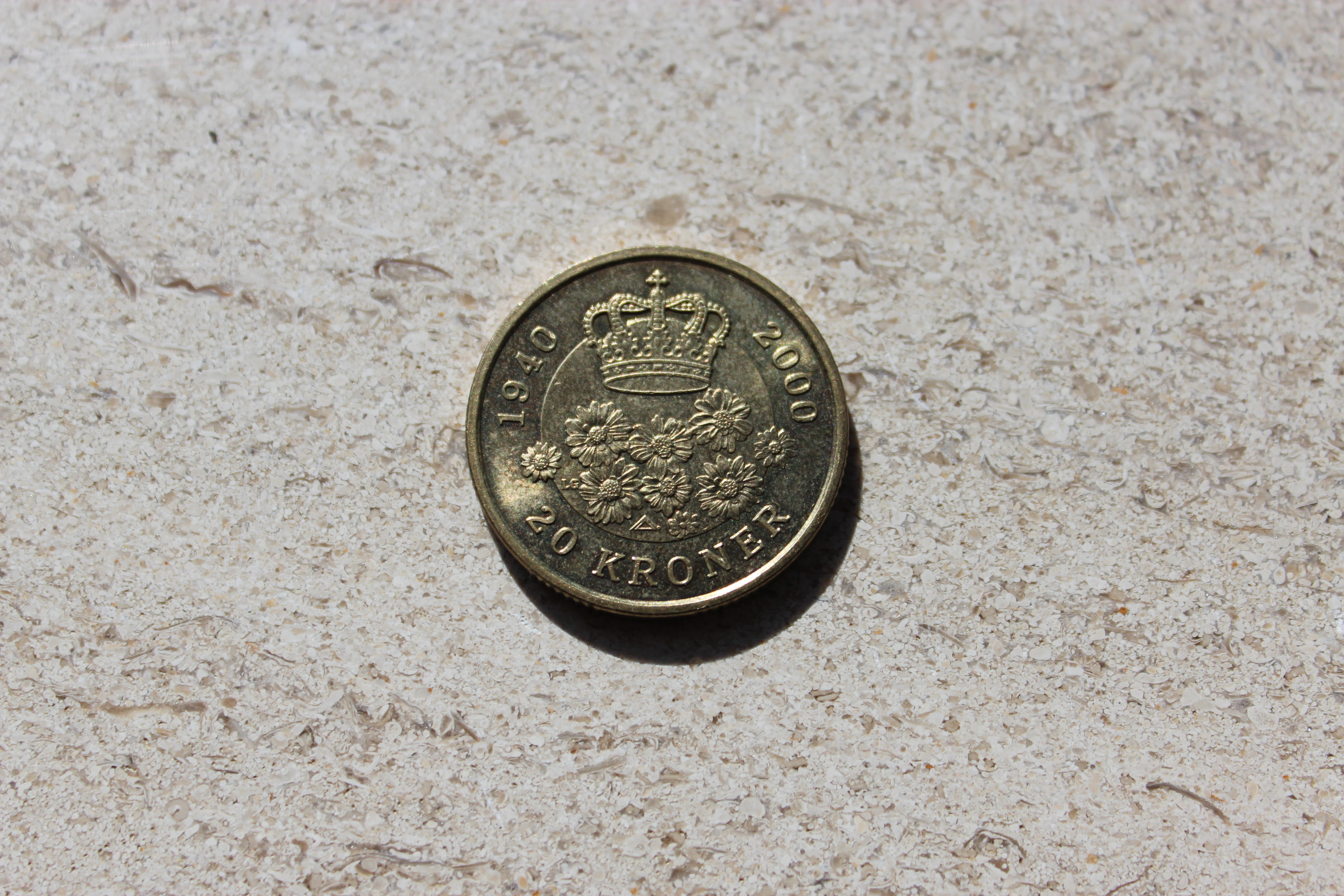
Reverse of the 20 kroner 60th Birthday of Queen Margrethe II coin

31.1035 grams .999 silver 31.10 grams ASW 38 mm. in diameter

- 1992 - 25th wedding anniversary of the Queen & Prince consort
- 1995 – 1000 years of Danish coinage
- 1995 - Wedding of Prince Joachim 18 November
- 1997 - 25th anniversary of accession of the Queen
- 2000 - 60th Birthday of Queen Margrethe II
- 2004 - Wedding of Crown Prince Frederik 14 May

The above coins also included a 20 Kroner coin of the same design struck in aluminum-bronze released for circulation.

==== 500 Kroner ====
31.1035 grams .999 silver 31.10 grams ASW 38 mm. in diameter

- 2010 - 70th Birthday of HM Queen Margrethe II
- 2012 - 40th anniversary of accession, Queen Margrethe II - reverse shield includes Faeroe Island & Greenland crests
- 2015 - 75th Birthday of HM Queen Margrethe II - front-facing portrait - reverse includes commemorative dates (to be issued in April 2015)

The above coin will also be issued as a 20 kroner aluminium-bronze coin in proof quality and for circulation.

==== 1000 Kroner ====
8.65 grams .900 gold. 22 mm. in diameter

- 2010 - 70th Birthday of HM Queen Margrethe II

==== 3000 Kroner ====
8.65 grams .900 gold. 22 mm. in diameter

- 2012 - 40th anniversary of accession, Queen Margrethe II - reverse shield includes Faeroe Island & Greenland crests

==== 10 Kroner ====
14.3000 grams .800 silver 11.40 grams ASW 32 mm. in diameter

- 1986 - 18th birthday of crown Prince Frederik 26 May

The above coin also included a 10 Kroner coin of the same design struck in cupro-nickel released for circulation and issued as a proof strike in limited quantity.

=== International Polar year ===
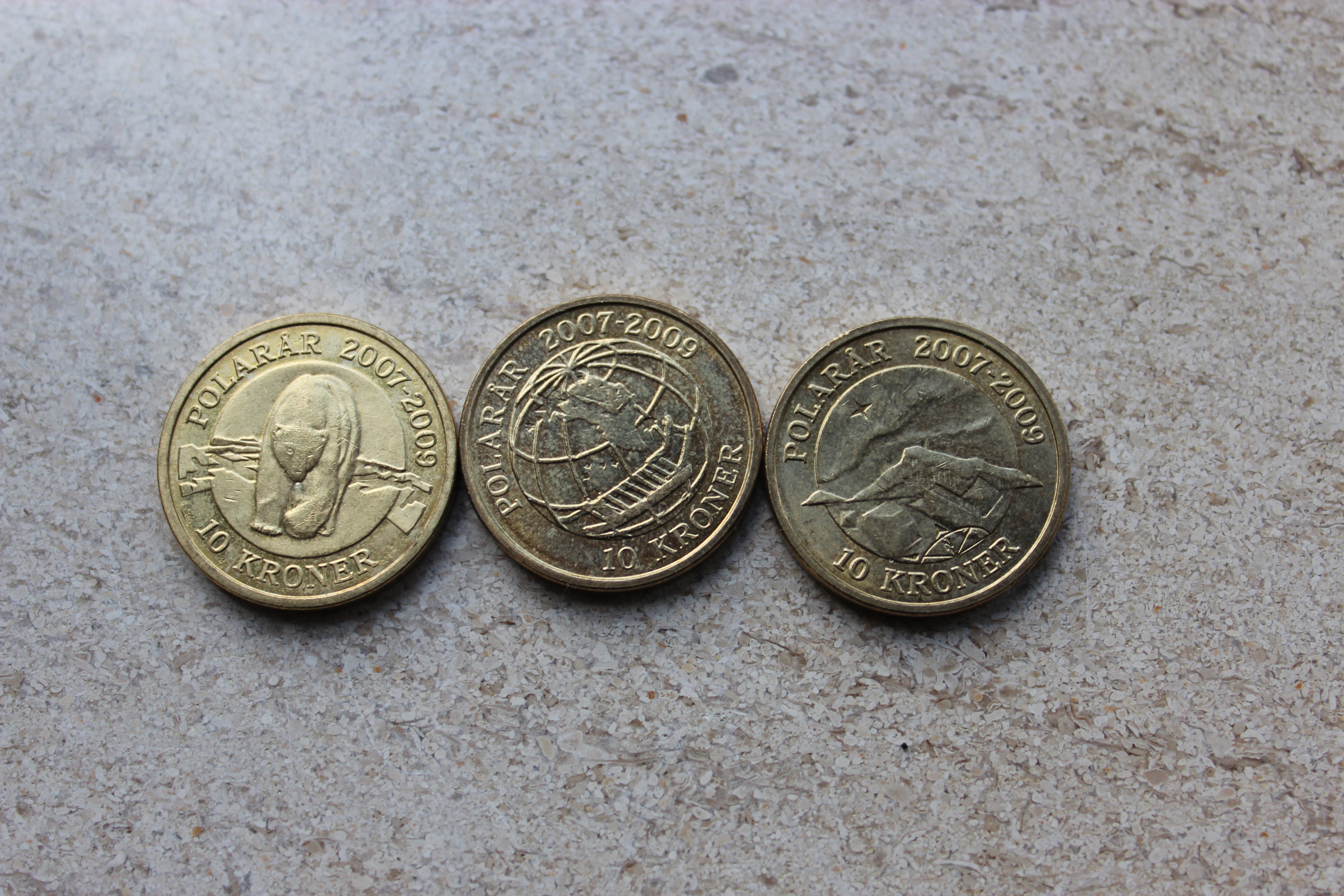
The 10 kroner polar year series

3 coins in the series.

==== 1000 Kroner - gold ====
8.65 grams .900 gold 7.78 grams AGW 22 mm. in diameter

Gold sourced from Greenland for this series includes polar bear mintmark

- 2007 - Polar bear, endangered species (winner of the 2008 COTY award for best gold coin)
- 2008 - Sirius dog sled Patrol
- 2009 - Northern Lights - Scientific research

==== 100 Kroner - silver ====
31.1035 grams .999 silver 31.10 grams ASW 38 mm. in diameter

- 2007 - Polar bear, endangered species
- 2008 - Sirius dog sled Patrol
- 2009 - Northern Lights - Scientific research

The above coins also included a 10 Kroner coin of the same design struck in aluminum-bronze released for circulation.

=== 200th anniversary, birth of Hans Christian Andersen ===
5 coins in the series.

==== 10 Kroner - gold ====
8.65 grams .900 gold 7.785 grams AGW 22 mm. in diameter

- 2005 - The Ugly Duckling"
- 2005 - "The Little Mermaid"
- 2006 - "The Shadow"
- 2006 - "The Snow Queen" (winner of the 2007 COTY award for most artistic coin design)
- 2007 - "The Nightingale"

==== 10 Kroner - silver ====
31.1035 grams .999 silver 31.10 grams ASW 38 mm. in diameter

- 2005 - Ugly Duckling
- 2005 - "The Little Mermaid"
- 2006 - "The Shadow"
- 2006 - "The Snow Queen" (winner of the 2007 COTY award for most artistic coin design)
- 2007 - "The Nightingale"

The above coins also included a 10 Kroner coin of the same design struck in aluminum-bronze released for circulation

=== Towers series ===
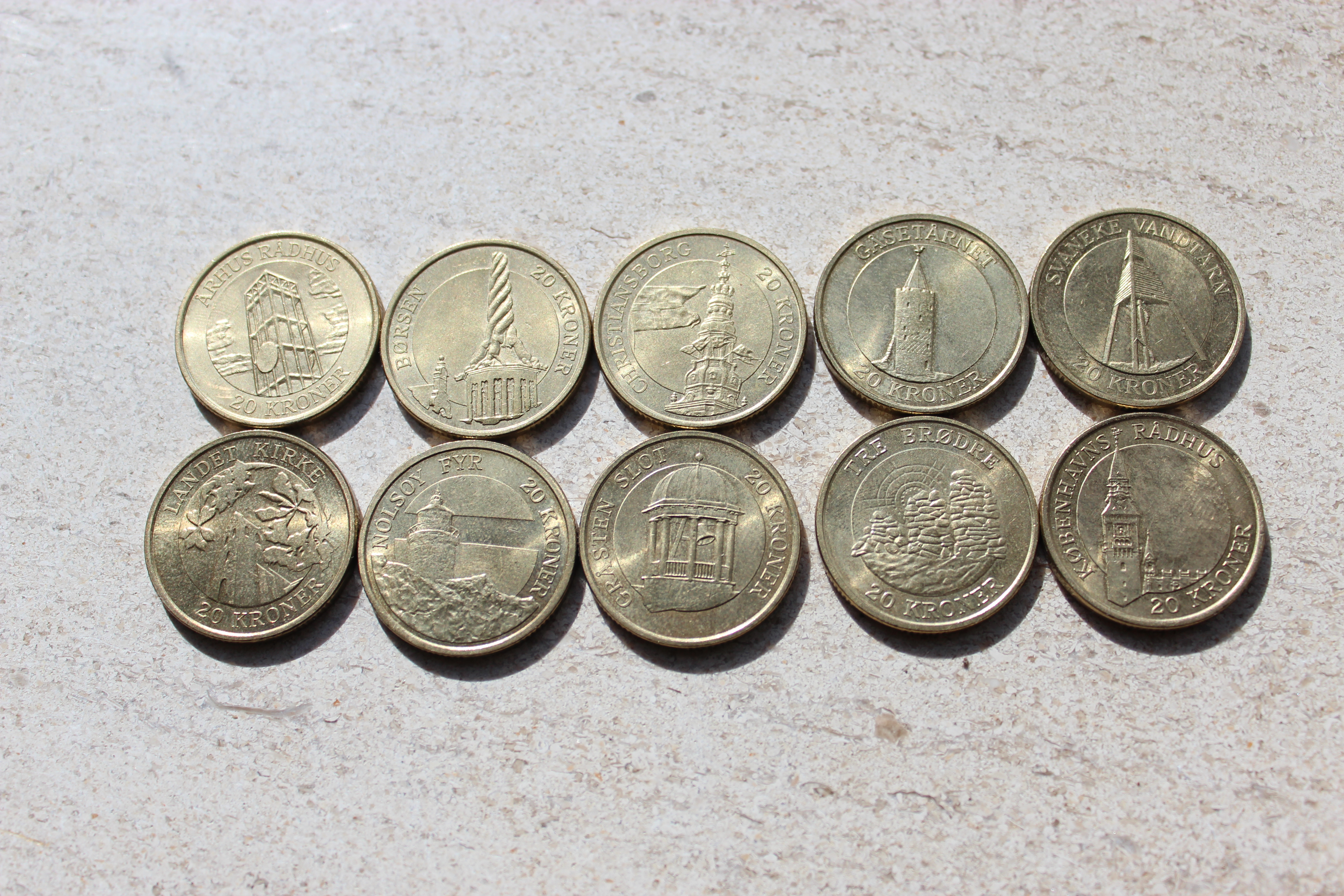
The Towers series

==== 20 Kroner ====
Aluminum-bronze base metal. 10 coins in the set.

- 2002 - Aarhus City Hall
- 2003 - Børsen; Old Copenhagen Stock Exchange
- 2003 - Christiansborg Palace
- 2004 - "The Goose Tower, Vordingborg Castle"
- 2004 - Svaneke Water Tower
- 2005 - Landet Church Tower
- 2005 - Nólsoy Lighthouse, Faeroe Islands
- 2006 - Gråsten Palace
- 2006 - "Three Brothers"
- 2007 - Copenhagen City Hall

=== Ships series (2007–2012) ===
12 coins in the series.

Image	Engraver	Feature	Volume	Date
	Øivind Nygård	HDMS Vædderen	Unknown	25 April 2007
Description:
	Hans Pauli Olsen	HDMS Jylland	Unknown	10 September 2007
Description:
	Torben Ebbesen	MS Selandia	Unknown	17 April 2008
Description:
	Erik Varming	Havhingsten fra Glendalough	Unknown	8 August 2008
Description:
	Henrik Wiberg	HDMY Dannebrog	Unknown	18 September 2008
Description:
	Karin Lorentzen	Lightship XVII	1.2 million	27 May 2009
Description:
	Hans Pauli Olsen	Faroese boat	0.9 million	2 November 2009
Description:
	Niels Motzfeldt	Kayak-Umiak	0.8 million	29 November 2010
Description:
	Torben Ebbesen	Emma Mærsk	0.8 million	18 March 2011
Description:
	Henrik Wiberg	SS Hjejlen	0.7 million	8 June 2011
Description:

=== Scientist series 2013 ===
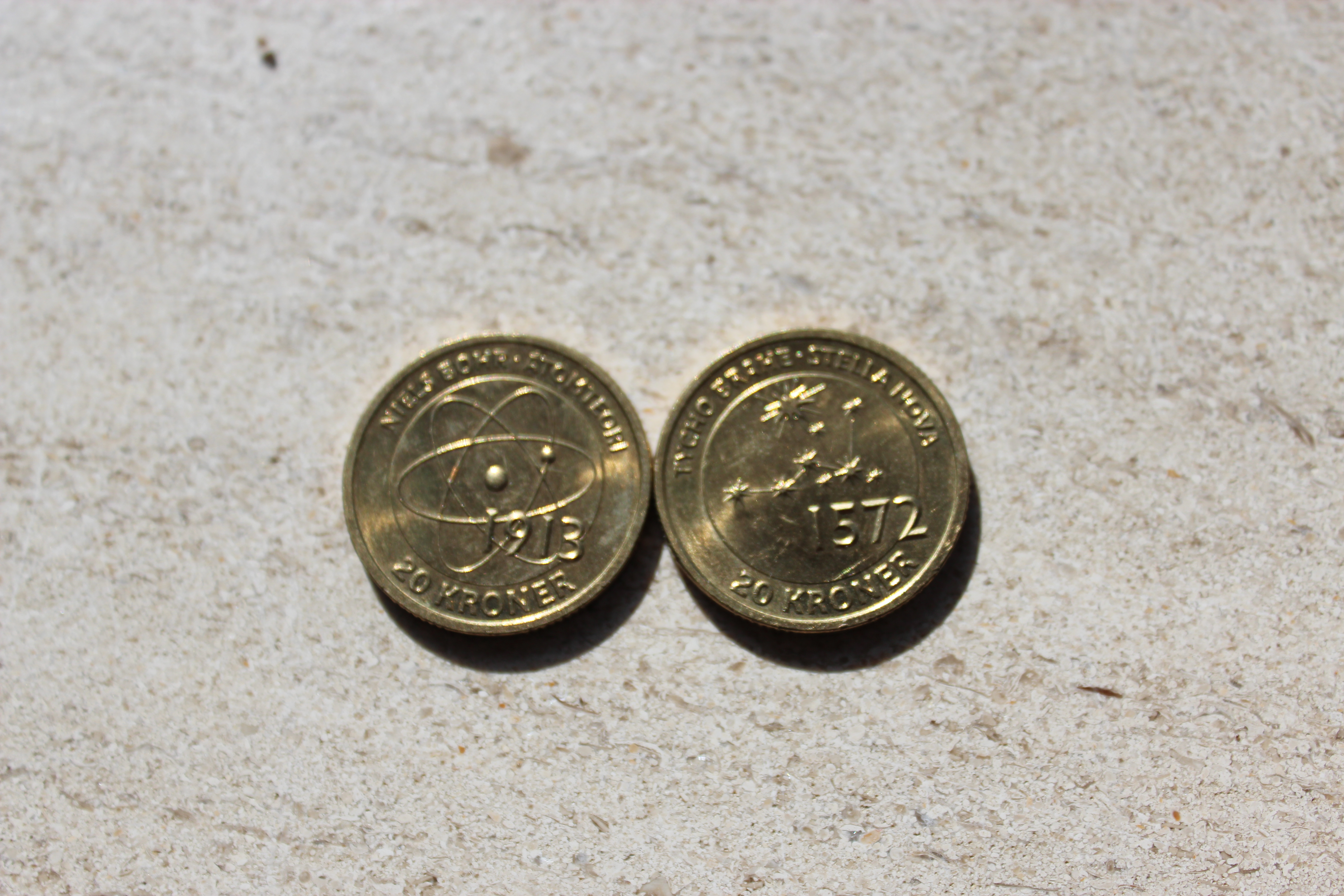
The 20 kroner Tycho Brahe coin

500 Kroner

.999 silver

31.1 grams

38 mm. diameter

4 coins in the series.

Niels Bohr : Atomic model

Hans Christian Ørsted : Electromagnetism

Ole Rømer : The speed of light

Tycho Brahe : Stella Nova

The above coins were also issued in 20 Kroner denominations in an aluminium-bronze alloy minted in both Proof quality and in circulation quality.
