= Godtfred Rump =

Danish painter

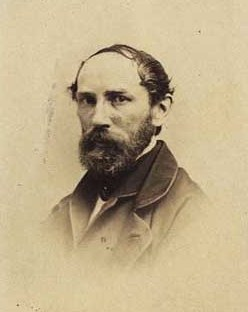
Godtfred Rump

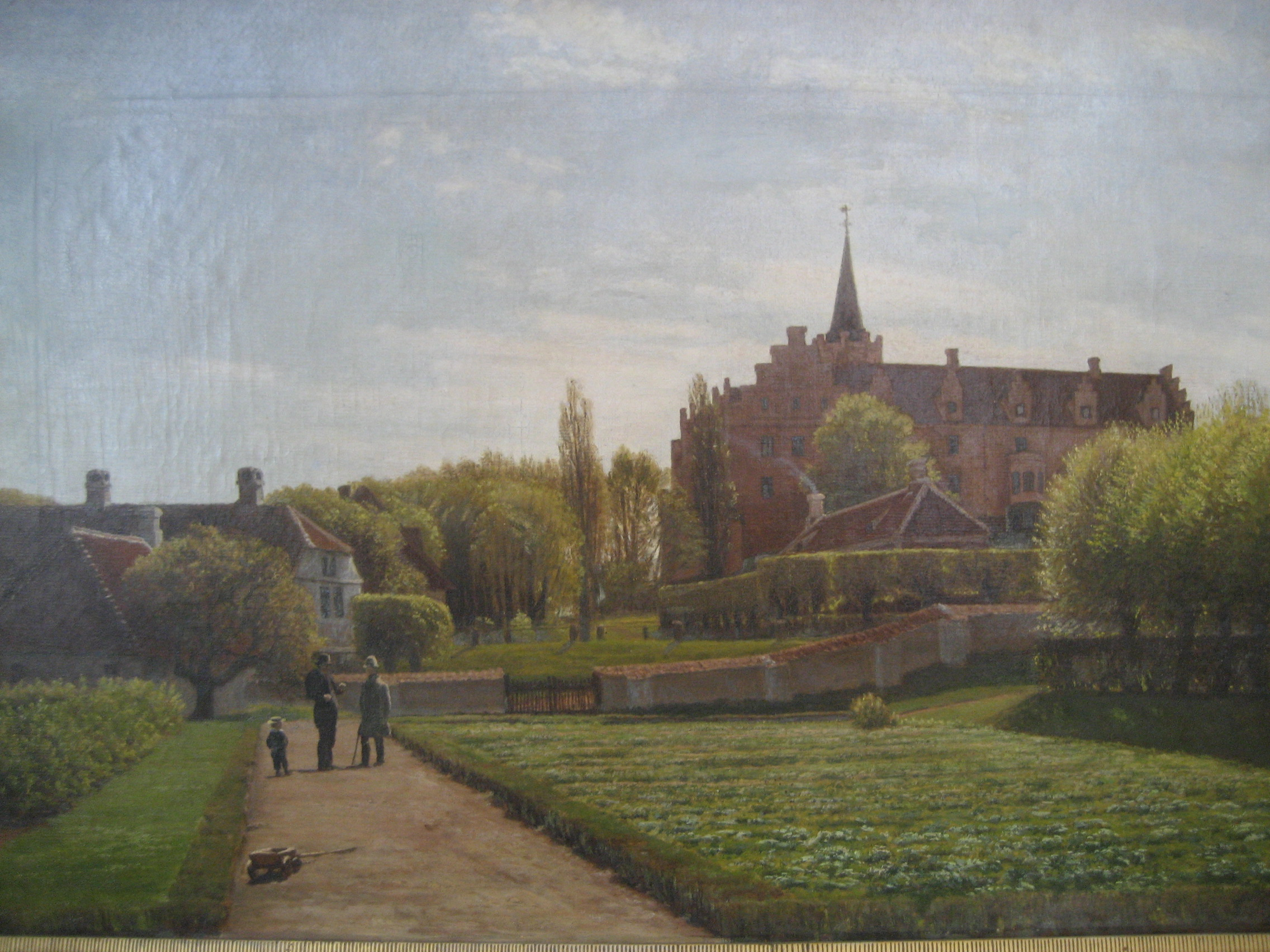
Tranekær (1878)

Christian Godtfred Rump (8 December 1816 – 25 May 1880) was one of the most productive Danish painters of his times. He first painted mainly genre and history works but later concentrated on landscapes.

== Biography ==
Born in Hillerød, Rump moved to Copenhagen when he was 16 and studied painting at the Royal Danish Academy of Fine Arts. He also worked in J.L. Lund's studio where many young painters gained experience in national romanticism.

In 1836, he exhibited a portrait at Charlottenborg but then concentrated for a time on history painting. However, moving with the trends of the times, he soon turned to genre painting with rural motifs. A few years later, possibly influenced by J.Th. Lundbye and P.C. Skovgaard, he found his true vocation, landscape painting. After spending some time in Italy in (1857–58), he became more adept at depicting the effects of light shining through foliage or through the mist, gaining wide recognition for his paintings of forests.

Rump was a member of the Academy from 1866, becoming a professor in 1874. His work is now considered to have been overshadowed by Lundbye and Skovgaard at a time when together with Janus la Cour and Godfred Christensen, his traditional approach was increasingly threatened by modern French trends such as Impressionism.

== Awards ==
In 1849, Rump was awarded the Thorvaldsen Medal.
