= John Olsen (Danish artist) =

Danish sculptor, illustrator, and artist (1938–2019)

John Olsen (25 May 1938 – 29 August 2019) was a Danish sculptor, illustrator and painter.

== Biography ==
Born in Roskilde, Olsen was first trained at the Royal Copenhagen porcelain factory before studying at the Royal Danish Academy of Fine Arts under Mogens Bøggild and Holger Jensen (1960–65). Inspired by nature, Olsen's works often emphasize details which would normally be overlooked but which he transforms into objects of beauty. His graphic works include studies of rocks or flocks of birds in Iceland or the Faroe Islands. His paintings often address birds or snowy landscapes. Olsen also draws on nature for his raw materials, making use of branches, animal skulls or stuffed birds. His creations depict nature's decay, evoking the fragility of life and the imminence of death while giving death itself beauty in its own right.

At the 1995 Venice Biennale, Olsen exhibited Resonans, a large sculpture inspired by an armadillo shell, as well as many other items based on his favourite subjects and materials. Other works from the mid-1990s include drawings he created in the sauna where charcoal and chalk interact with sweat and steam, resulting in the reddish-brown works known as Svedetegninger (Sweat Drawings).

In connection with John Olsen's 70th birthday on 25 May 2008, a retrospective exhibition of his work opened in the Johannes Larsen Museum in Kerteminde. The exhibition was later presented at other museums, including Hosltebro Museum from 13 September 2008.

John Olsen died on 29 August 2019, at the age of 81.

== Awards ==
In 1985, Olsen was awarded the Eckersberg Medal and, in 1997, the Thorvaldsen Medal.

== Literature ==
- Porsmose, Erland (2008). John Olsen - kunsten at se: en biografi (in Danish). Johannes Larsen Museet. ISBN 978-87-88564-85-3.
