= Stig Brøgger =

Danish artist (1941–2021)

Stig Brøgger (8 December 1941 – 8 February 2021) was a Danish artist who worked with sculpture, painting, installations and photography. His aims have been to show how art contributes to man's experience of life and his understanding of the surrounding world.

== Biography ==
Born in Slagelse, Brøgger studied political science at the University of Copenhagen (1960–67) but also studied art at Eks-skolen (the experimental art school) from 1964 to 1966. In the 1960s, he began to develop new trends in Danish art, influenced by developments in the United States in the areas of Minimal Art, Land Art and Conceptual Art. He helped to communicate his ideas by presenting illustrated articles in the art journal ta'.

Early works included De fire temperamenter (The Four Temperaments, 1966) consisting of large figures covering the exhibition walls, Lady Luck (1967), which was repositioned every day providing different effects, and the Pamela Series (1968) depicting the same person but with different texts focusing on varied interpretations. Sculptures in the same period included his hexagonal works and Platformprojektet (The Platform Project, 1970) in which photographs of an entropic platform placed in different locations in Copenhagen and New York recorded the interaction between the object and the environment.

In 1974, together with Hein Heinsen and Mogens Møller, Brøgger founded the Institut for Skalakunst which produced a number of decorative public works such as Stedet og skyggen (Place and Shadow, 1976) for Birkerød's Sjælsøskolen, Stjerne, Stjerneport og Stjernefragment (Star, Star Gate and Star Fragment, 1980) for Aalborg University, Fredens Port (Gate of Peace, 1982) in the Copenhagen district of Nørrebro as well as comprehensive decoration of Ollerup Gymnastics School (2007).

Painting has always played an important role in Brøgger's work, even in installations such as Flora Danica (1990) and Plainthings (1997). Striving to provide better understanding of the world, his paintings combine geometrical shapes with unruly masses of colour.

His 2013 exhibition of photographs Suburban Life - Photography as Painting consists of 44 plates, each containing six photographs. Depicting a wide variety of subjects from landscapes to buildings and flowers, they document life in the suburbs, adding to Brøgger's earlier works and his experience of life.

== Awards ==
In 1991, Brøgger was awarded the Eckersberg Medal and, in 1998, the Thorvaldsen Medal.

== Literature ==
- Brøgger, Stig (1990). Flora Danica. Statens Museum for Kunst. ISBN 978-87-7551-054-2.
- Brøgger, Stig (1978). Scale House: Stig Brøgger, Hein Heinsen, Mogens Møller. Malmö Konsthall.
