= Kasper Heiberg =

Danish painter and sculptor

Kasper Jacob Heiberg (3 April 1928 – 27 February 1984) was a Danish painter and sculptor. Though largely forgotten today, in retrospect Heiberg is considered to have made an important contribution to the development of Danish painting.

== Biography ==
Born in Kongens Lyngby to the north of Copenhagen, Heiberg was the son of the Norwegian-born architect Edvard Heiberg. He studied painting at the Royal Danish Academy of Fine Arts under Vilhelm Lundstrøm, William Scharff and Elof Risebye from 1948 to 1956. He first exhibited at Kunstnernes Efterårsudstilling (Artists Autumn Exhibition) in 1949. For a time, he created Realistic paintings but soon adopted a more experimental Abstract approach, based on the interrelationship of colours within the work.

From 1962 to 1969 he lived in Paris where he was inspired by the Groupe de Recherche d’Art Visuel (GRAV), whose works he had seen at the 1963 Biennale. Following the group's attempts to break down the conventions between painting and sculpture, he began to work with colour models allowing the colour to extend beyond the confines of the painting.

On his return to Denmark in the 1970s, he created a number of coloured three-dimensional works decorating buildings including the Skjoldhøj College in Brabrand (1975) and Thisted Gymnasium (1978). His last sculptural work stands in front of Espergærde Library. Divided into three parts, the images invoke human beings and animals while the black and white hues represent ink on the pages of a book.

== Awards ==
In 1971, Heiberg was awarded the Eckersberg Medal and, in 1983, the Thorvaldsen Medal.

== Literature ==
- Kofoed, Kira (2013). Kasper Heiberg: pioner i farver. KØS, Museum for Kunst i det Offentlige Rum. ISBN 978-87-89074-57-3.
