= Kirsten Lockenwitz =

Danish artist and sculptor (1932–2025)

Kirsten Lockenwitz (2 May 1932 – 20 July 2025) was a Danish artist and sculptor. Her elegant abstract works can be seen in public spaces, for example in Copenhagen and Aalborg.

== Life and career ==
Born in Copenhagen, Lockenwitz studied at the Royal Danish Academy of Fine Arts from 1962 to 1967 under Niels Lergaard and Dan Sterup-Hansen. In her early work she employed strong bright colour and also experimented with ceramics. She left the Academy without graduating to explore sculpture with industrial materials including glass and neon tubes, experimenting with transparency and reflection. Her work was influenced both by Danish Constructivism and trends in American art from the 1960s. In the late 1980s, her work began to exhibit increasing freedom of expression, moving in the direction of naturalism. Inspired by cliff formations, her elegant monumental creations were executed with careful precision, achieving clarity and spirituality. Lockenenwitz has been able to produce simple, poetic works focusing on abstraction.

Among Lockenwitz' major creations are Discrimination (2001) beside the Royal Library's Black Diamond building in Copenhagen and Tripalaka (1996) on Aalborg's harbour front. In 2014, her Skulpturskoven was installed in the park at Sophienholm in Lyngby near Copenhagen.

Lockenwitz died on 20 July 2025, at the age of 93.

== Awards ==
In 1986, Lockenwitz was awarded the Eckersberg Medal and, in 2000, the Thorvaldsen Medal.
