= Thorvald Niss =

Danish landscape painter (1842–1905)

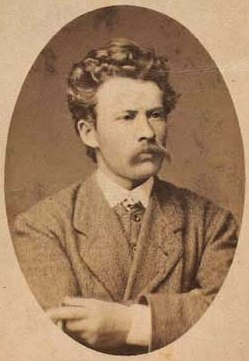
Thorvald Niss photographed by Heinrich Tönnies (1874)

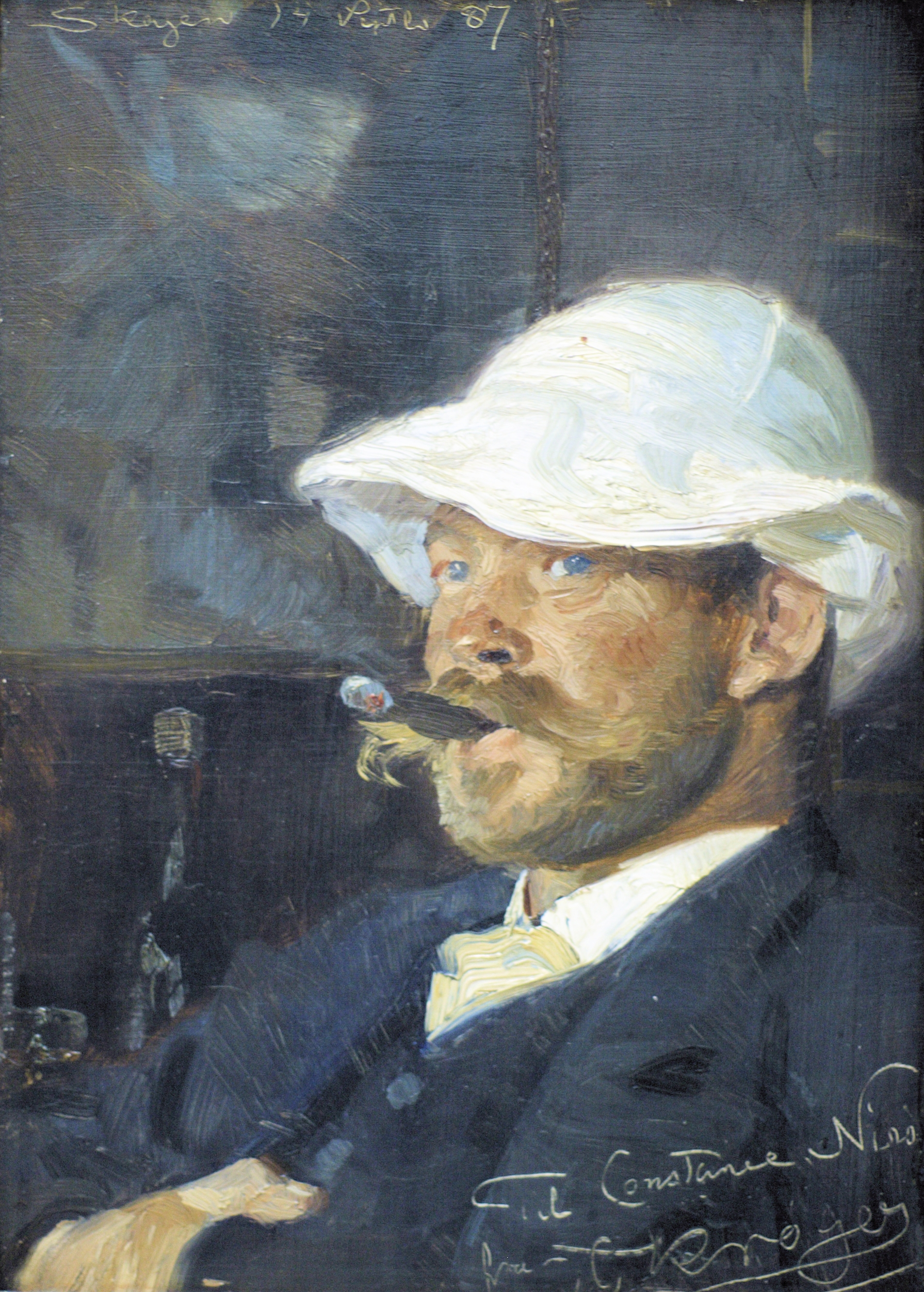
Thorvald Niss painted by Peder Severin Krøyer

Thorvald Simeon Niss (7 May 1842 – 11 May 1905) was a Danish landscape painter who became interested in marine art after becoming a member of the Skagen Painters.

== Biography ==
Born in Assens, he was the son of Niels Frederik Niss, a house painter, and his wife Barbara Kirstine. When he was 18, he became a painter's apprentice in Copenhagen where he tried to develop his artistic talents in the evenings. From 1861, he attended evening school at the Royal Danish Academy and from 1863 worked as a decorator at the Royal Copenhagen porcelain factory. In the late 1870s, he came into contact with Otto Bache who invited him to work in his studio where he became acquainted with the latest trends in French painting. By the beginning of the 1880s, he had become a modern landscape artist, comparable to Christian Zacho and Godfred Christensen.

The broad strokes and strong colours he applied to his autumn and winter landscapes brought him wide recognition. In 1882, his Septemberdag i Jægersborg dyrehave won him a gold medal in Vienna and the following year a winter landscape of the Folehaven woods was bought by Statens Museum for Kunst, the Danish national gallery bringing him wider recognition. Thanks to a travel grant, in 1885 he went to Italy and Greece, and in 1889 to Paris. In 1887, he visited Skagen where he became a member of artists' colony known as the Skagen Painters. There he painted the sea, adopting a new approach to marine art with his Morgengry (1888) and Strandparti. Grenen (1889). He went on to paint marine scenes elsewhere, especially of the Mediterranean. In the 1890s, he increasingly used etching for his marine scenes, some with symbolic undertones.

In 1883, he was awarded the Eckersberg Medal and the Thorvaldsen Medal. In 1887 he became a member of the Royal Danish Academy of Fine Arts (re-elected 1890) and in 1892 he became a Knight of the Order of the Dannebrog. After suffering for a number of years from a nervous breakdown, he died in Frederiksberg and was buried at Hillerød.

== Gallery ==
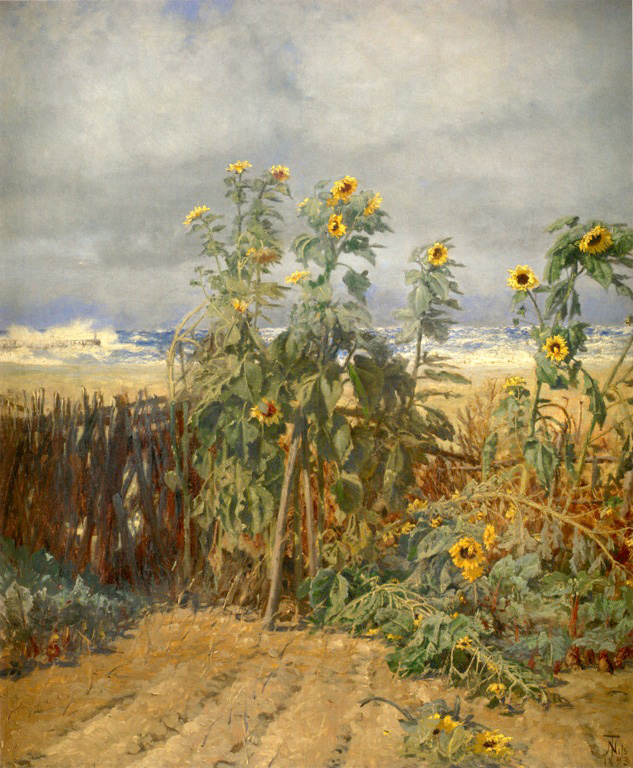
Sunflowers growing on the beach

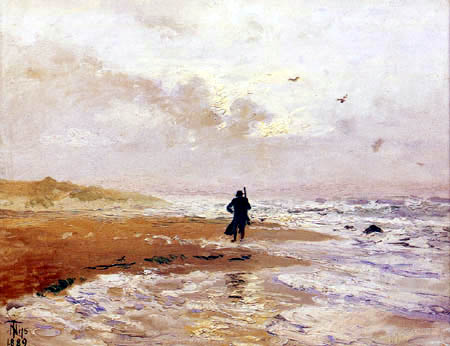
Skagen Strand

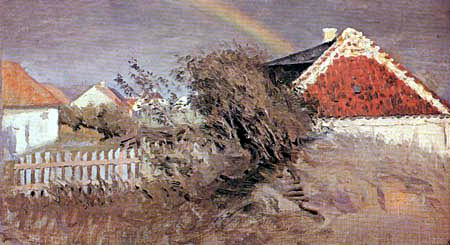
P.S. Krøyers første atelier i Skagen

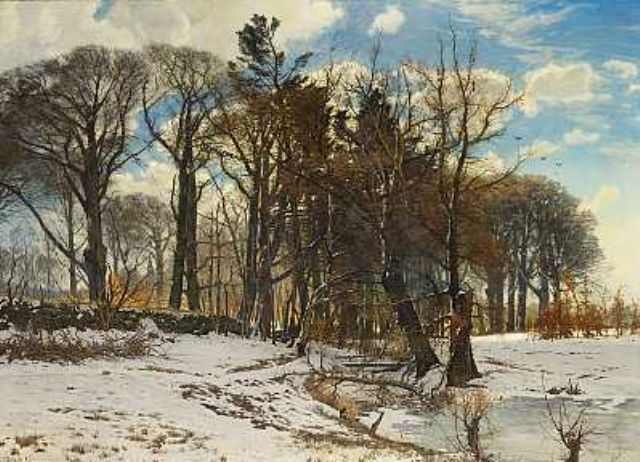
A winterday

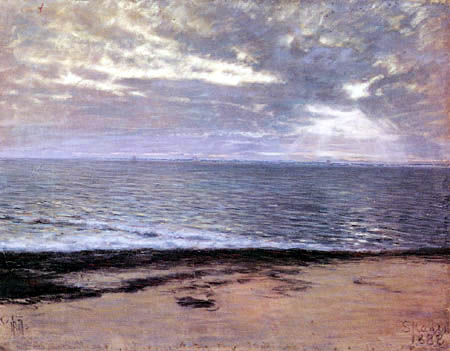
Dawn

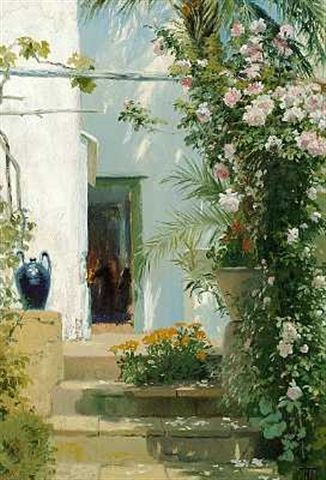
Roses

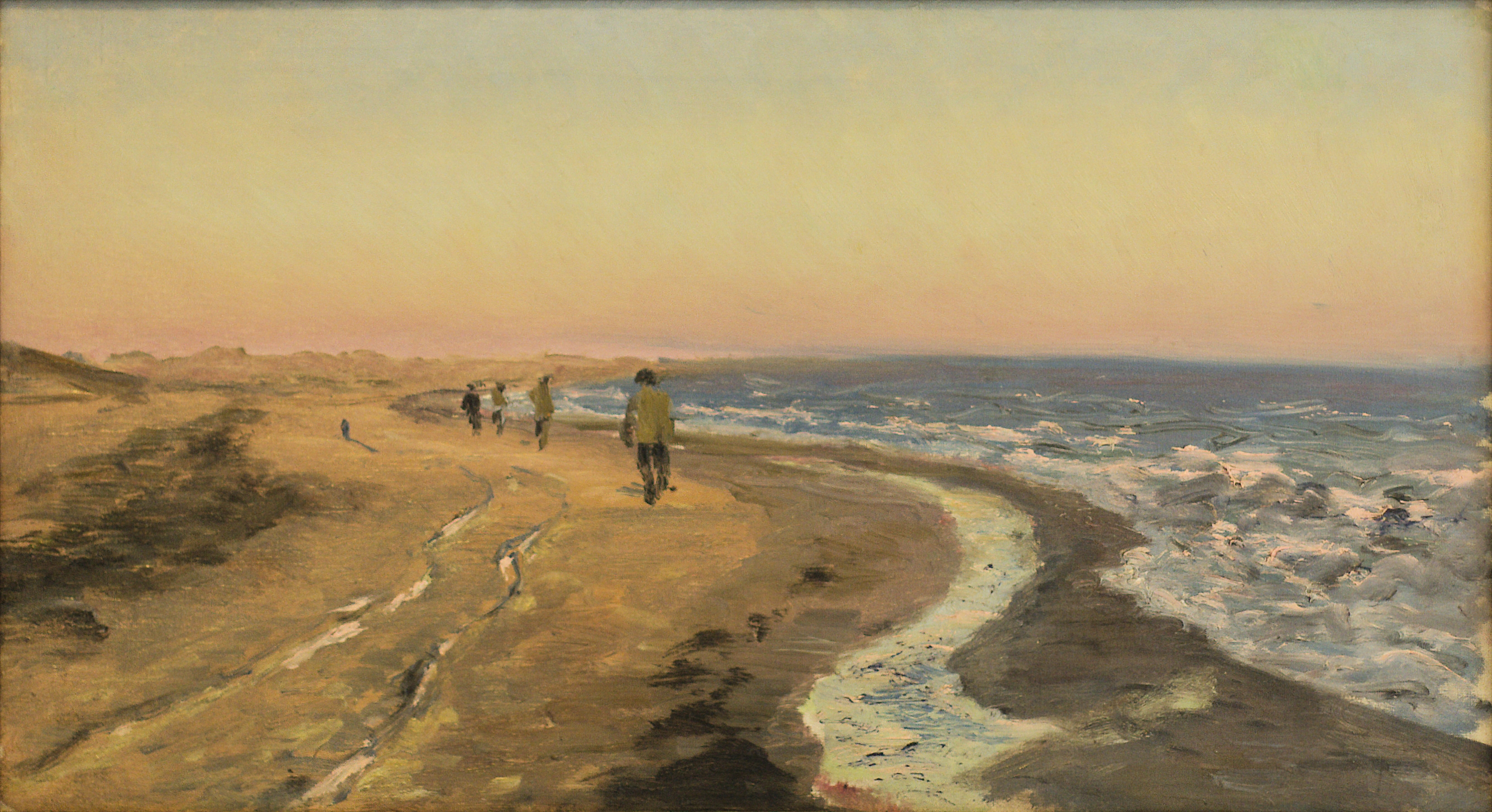
The painters returning home

== See also ==
- Skagen Painters
