= Alsing =

Alsing is a given name and surname. Notable people with the name include:

== Given name ==
- Alsing Andersen (1893–1962), Danish politician
- Peter Alsing Nielsen (1907–1985), Danish painter

== Surname ==
- Adam Alsing (1968–2020), Swedish television and radio presenter
- Olle Alsing (born 1996), Swedish ice hockey player
