= Elsa Nielsen =

Danish graphic artist

Elsa Agnete Yvonne Nielsen née Bendixsen (21 September 1923 – 11 October 2011) was a Danish graphic artist. The grand-daughter of the painter Laurits Tuxen, in 1946 she married the graphic artist Palle Nielsen.

== Biography ==
Born in Copenhagen, as a child she spent her holidays in the Tuxen's summerhouse in Skagen. After completing her schooling, she studied painting privately under Viggo Brandt at the Glyptotek and at Erik Clemmensen's art school. She then attended the Royal Danish Academy of Fine Arts under Vilhelm Lundstrøm, graduating in 1947. Her few recurring motifs include glassware, ancient female busts and, above all, withered flowers. Her drawings and prints consist of a multitude of thin vibrating lines.

A member of the Corner artists association, she exhibited there from 1986. She has also exhibited frequently at Clausens Kunsthandel, Copenhagen. Her works are in the collections of several Danish museums.

== Awards ==
In 1985, she was awarded the Eckersberg Medal.

== Literature ==
- Irve, Bent (2005). Elsa Nielsen: akvarel, tegning, grafik. Rhodos. ISBN 978-87-7245-958-5.
