= Thomas Bang =

Danish sculptor (born 1938)

Thomas Bang (born 6 September 1938) is a Danish sculptor who in the 1970s contributed to Conceptual art and Pop art in the United States.

== Biography ==
Born in Copenhagen, as a young man Bang became interested in Surrealism as practised by Giorgio de Chirico, Max Ernst and Yves Tanguy. After he moved to the United States with his parents, he studied art at the University of Cincinnati (1958–59), the Cleveland Institute of Art (1959–61), Yale University (1961–62), and the University of Southern California (1962–64). He soon became part of the American experimental art scene which covered Minimal Art, Conceptual Art and Pop Art. He exhibited with pioneers in the field including Carl Andre, Richard Serra, Jasper Johns, Frank Stella, Sol LeWitt and Bruce Nauman.

Working in an existentialist approach with modest materials, the fragment is a recurring theme and concepts include construction and destruction, open and closed, covering and uncovering, structure and process. His work has addressed the potential of the object, representing absurd perceptions of dissonance in our attempts to achieve harmony between ourselves and our surroundings. From the late 1960s, three-dimensional objects cover transitions from painting to free-standing works. He exhibited them in the United States in leading museums together with other pioneers such as Robert Morris, Eva Hesse and Joel Shapiro. By the 1970s, he was producing long square-shaped plaster objects standing on the floor or up against the walls which contained covered or partly covered rolls of steel wire. In the 1980s, his works became more complex while in the 1990s he worked in larger formats, creating mainly wooden objects adorned with metal, wax and paint, sometimes with additional strips of plastic or cloth.

Bang had a professorship at the University of Rochester in New York State from 1970 to 1991. He has exhibited widely in the United States, Germany and Denmark. His work can be seen in collections in Europe and the United States.

== Awards ==
In 1990, Bang was awarded the Eckersberg Medal and, in 2000, the Thorvaldsen Medal.
