= Martin Erik Andersen =

Danish sculptor

Martin Erik Andersen (born 1964) is a Danish sculptor who also works with drawings, textiles and sound. A former professor at the Royal Danish Academy of Fine Arts, he was a recipient of the Thorvaldsen Medal in 2014.

== Biography ==
Andersen lives and works in Copenhagen. He studied at the Royal Danish Academy of Fine Arts (1985–92) and also in Cairo. 2009-2018 he was a professor at the Academy's department of sculpture. His installations draw on a variety of techniques and materials including textiles, creations on paper, video, sound and light as well as scaffolding, plants and polyester. They attract the viewer, providing a new perspective of familiar objects.

His Freud's Gashgai (2011) in Statens Museum for Kunst is inspired by the rug on Sigmund Freud's couch which is now presented as a sculpted polyester relief. Like his other works, there is a relationship between the two-dimensional (the rug) and the three-dimensional (when spread over the couch) as well as between image and object.

Other notable installations include Kingdom of dirt, a complex set of symmetric patterns on a concrete floor mosaic, and More give me more give me more — dette dit dørtrin, a huge upright purple carpet hanging on a steel frame representing a contemporary paraphrase of the Ardabil Carpet. It was on the basis of these pieces that he was awarded the Thorvaldsen Medal.

== Awards ==
In 2004, Andersen was awarded the Eckersberg Medal and, in 2014, the Thorvaldsen Medal.
