= Mogens Bøggild =

Danish sculptor (1901–1987)

Mogens Kruse Bøggild (11 June 1901 – 25 April 1987) was a Danish sculptor. He specialized in figures of animals, including the granite Grisebrønden (Pig Fountain) in Aarhus which he created from 1941 to 1950.

== Biography ==
Born in Hillerød, after being introduced to painting by Karl Jensen at the local Technical School, Bøggild studied under Einar Utzon-Frank at the Royal Danish Academy of Fine Arts. Showing a particular interest in Italian Renaissance art, he was inspired by the works of Theodor Philipsen and J.Th. Lundbye as well as by Joakim Skovgaard's more recent Dragespringvand. As a result, he created many several significant sculptures of animals including Bjørnebrønden (Bear Fountain, 1936–39) in Nykøbing Falster, Grisebrønden (Pig Fountain, 1941–50) near Aarhus City Hall, Hjort og ørne (Stag and Eagle Monument, 1941–46) in Hillerød, Radiofonifigurgruppen (Group of Radio Figures, 1945–50) outside Radiohuset in Copenhagen, To søstre (Two Sisters, 1963–77) in front of Glostrup Town Hall and Tito, stejlende hingst (Tito, the Prancing Stallion, 1982) at Hillerød Town Hall. Bøggild gained a reputation for working very slowly; it took him 16 years to complete his Two Sisters which was finally installed in 1977.

Bøggild designed the pulpit in Jesus Church, Valby, in 1934. He was a professor of sculpture at the Royal Danish Academy from 1955 to 1971.

In 2013, the Thorvaldsen Museum hosted an exhibition of Bøggild's work.

== Awards ==
Bøggild was awarded the Eckersberg Medal in 1930 and the Thorvaldsen Medal in 1940.

== Literature ==
- Gelius, William; Miss, Stig (2013). Mogens Bøggild på Thorvaldsens Museum. Thorvaldsens Museum. ISBN 978-87-7521-130-2.
