= Ebba Carstensen =

Danish painter

Ebba Ninna Back Carstensen (23 August 1885 – 13 October 1967) was a Danish painter. Her painting developed from a rather Impressionist style towards Cubism.

== Biography ==
Born in Västra Kärrstorp near Malmö in Sweden, she was the daughter of a farmer. When she was 18 months old, the family moved to Denmark, where they lived on the little farm of Eriksholm near Helsingør. Her upbringing in the country was to inspire her paintings of poultry, cattle and fields. She first studied painting under Sigurd Wandel in Helsingør (1903–05) before attending A.W. Bouguereau and Edouard Sain's school of painting. From 1909 to 1913, she attended the Royal Danish Academy of Fine Arts, studying under Laurits Tuxen and Valdemar Irminger.

She first exhibited in 1908 in Charlottenborg. Thereafter her painting was increasingly influenced by modern trends she learned from Danish painters who had returned from Paris. She abandoned Impressionism in favour of the more disciplined style of Cubism, evoking a "return to nature".

Carstensen was a member of the Decembrister (Decemberists), a group formed by Svend Albrectsen, Søren Hjorth Nielsen, Holger J. Jensen, Erik Sievert and Jørgen Thomsen who were unhappy with the opportunities for exhibiting and arranged their own exhibition each year in December. Established in 1932, the group was attracted by Expressionism.

== Awards ==
Carstensen received the Eckersberg Medal in 1930 and the Thorvaldsen Medal in 1951.

== Literature ==
- Carstensen, Ebba (1987). Ebba Carstensen fra 1920 til 1940: mellem modernismen og barndommens land: Vejle Kunstmuseum, 21.11.1987-17.1.1988: Skive Museums Kunstafdeling, 23.1-20.3.1988: Kunsthallen, København, 28.3. - 8.4.1988.
- Skive Museum.Kunstafdelingen; Vejle Kunstmuseum; Kunsthallen (København) (1987). Ebba Carstensen fra 1920 til 1940: mellem modernismen og barndommens land. Vejle Kunstmuseum. ISBN 978-87-7388-016-6.
