= Christian Daugaard =

Danish painter

Niels Christian Daugaard (18 March 1901 – 19 July 1993) was a Danish painter.

== Biography ==
Born in Kolding, Daugaard studied painting at the Royal Danish Academy of Fine Arts under Ejnar Nielsen (1923–25). After his studies, he returned to his home town where he painted domestic life and landscapes of the surrounding area. His earlier work was predominantly light yellow or ochre but later on he used brighter colours in a style approaching Cubism. After moving to Kastrup on the island of Amager, he painted landscapes of the flat surroundings illuminated by the light of different seasons. Most recently, he employed bright watercolours in the Expressionist style.

== Awards ==
In 1955, Daugaard was awarded the Eckersberg Medal and, in 1990, the Thorvaldsen Medal.
