= Christen Christensen (sculptor) =

Danish sculptor and medallist

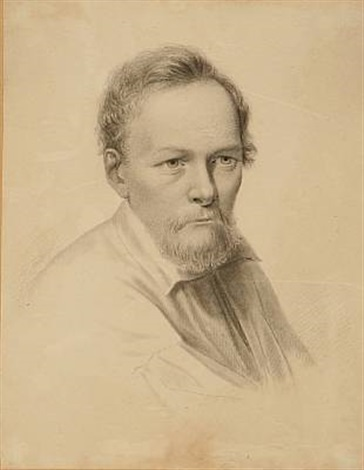
- Portrait by Edvard Lehmann
- Born: 18 January 1806; Copenhagen, Denmark
- Died: 21 August 1845 (aged 39); Copenhagen, Denmark
- Known for: Medallist and sculptor

Christen Christensen (18 January 1806 – 21 August 1845) was a Danish sculptor and medallist. His works as a medallist include the Royal Danish Academy of Fine Arts' C. F. Hansen Medal and Thorvaldsen Medal.

== Early life and education ==
Christensen was born on 17 January 1806 in Copenhagen, the son of merchant and later innkeeper John Christensen (d. c. 1819) and Maria Kirstine Birch. He studied at the Royal Danish Academy of Fine Arts and was at the same time in 1819–23 articled to the sculptor Nicolai Dajon. He won the Academy's small and large silver medals in 1824, the small gold medal in 1825 and finally the large gold medal in 1827.

== Career ==
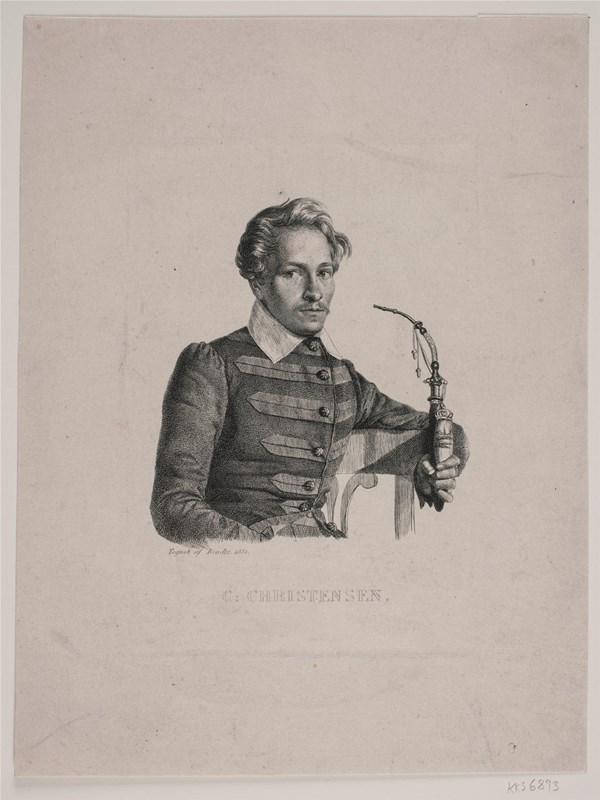
Christen Christensen by Caroline Behrend

Christensen was already as a student commissioned to create a number of sculptural works for the Royal Danish Theatre and Christianshorg Palace. Instigated by the Academy's praeses, Prince Christian Frederick, he then decided to continue his education as a medallist. He won a prize for a medal Christian Frederik Hansen and was in addition to the prize money granted an extra remuneration as well as a travel stipend. He then went on a four-year journey abroad in 1831–34 of which he spent three of the years in Rome. He then made his way back to Denmark by way of Paris and Berlin to study medals on the way.

In 1835, he was made an associate member (agreeret) of the Academy and received as the subject of his admissions work a medal commemorating the homecoming of Bertel Thorvaldsen's works. The medal in silver would in the future be awarded to artists for exceptional contributions to the annual Charlottenborg exhibitions. Christensen was based on the model for the medal admitted as member of the Academy in 1838, but his work with the stamps was hit by a number of accidents and it had therefore not yet been completed when the Exhibition Medal was awarded for the first time to Martinus Rørbye in 1839. In 1842, it was finally possible to present Thorvladsen with the first medal in gold.

In 1844, Christensen was made a professor at the Academy's model school. In 1843, he was made a foreign member of the Art Academy in Berlin. In 1845, he was made a foreign member of the Royal Swedish Academy of Fine Arts.

== Works ==
Copperplate engraving by Erling Eckersberg of Christensen's Thorvaldsen Medal, 1850

Christensen has created a total of 21 medals. These include kometmedaljen (1832) and medals commemorating Frederik VI's recovery and death (1839), the reformation anniversary (1836), the royal couple's silver wedding (front side, 1840), Crown Prince Frederick's wedding (front side, 1841), the 100-year anniversary of the Royal Danish Academy of Sciences (1842), Albert Thaer (1833), A. W. Hauch (1838) and Michael Nielsen (1844).

His work as a sculptor includes a considerable number of portrait busts and reliefs.

== Personal life ==
Christensen was married to Oline Louise Bugge (22 January 1805 – 9 March 1878), a daughter of master joiner Ole B. (1765–1815) and Gertrud Kirschbaum (1770–1813), on 8 August 1835. He was created a Knight in the Order of the Dannebrog in 1843.

== Depictions ==
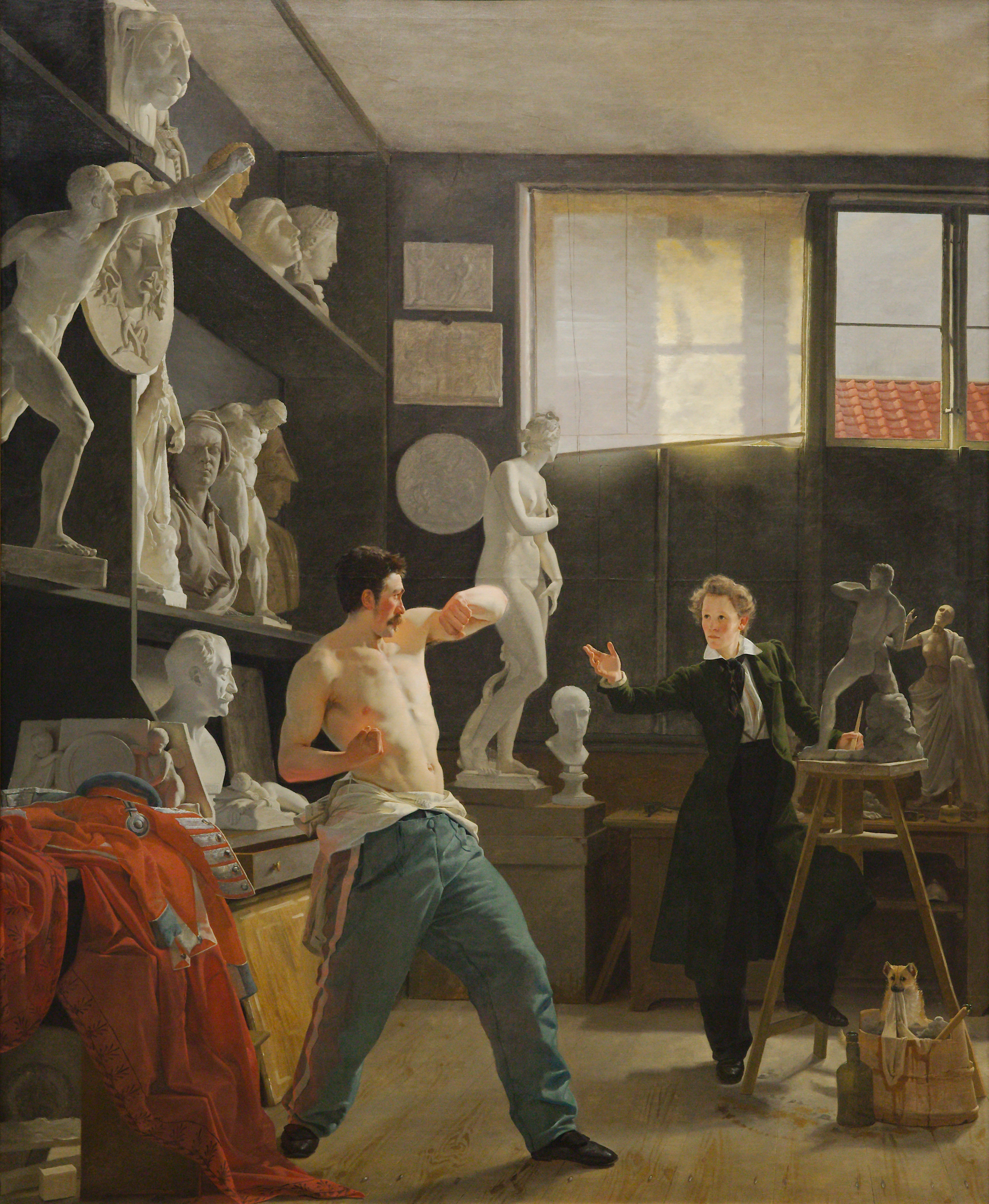
Wilhelm Bendz: A sculptor working from live model studies, 1827

Christensen is seen in Wilhelm Bendz's 1827 genre painting A sculptor working from live model studies (Danish National Gallery). He is also seen in Bendz' painting of Finchs kaffehus (1832. Thorvaldsens Museum). He has also been the subject of portrait paintings by Constantin Hansen (1831, Hirschsprung Collection) and J. V. Gertner (1836, Danish National Gallery).

Christensen has also been the subject of portrait drawings by H. Eddelin (1830, Royal Danish Library), H. E. Freund (c. 1830), W. Bendz (1831, Danish National Gallery), Constantin Hansen (1832, Nysø), Gertner (1844), J. L. Lund and Johs. Jensen (Frederiksborg Museum). He has also been portrayed on an etching by Caroline Behrens (1831) and a lithograph by Hanfstaengl (1832).

== Gallery ==
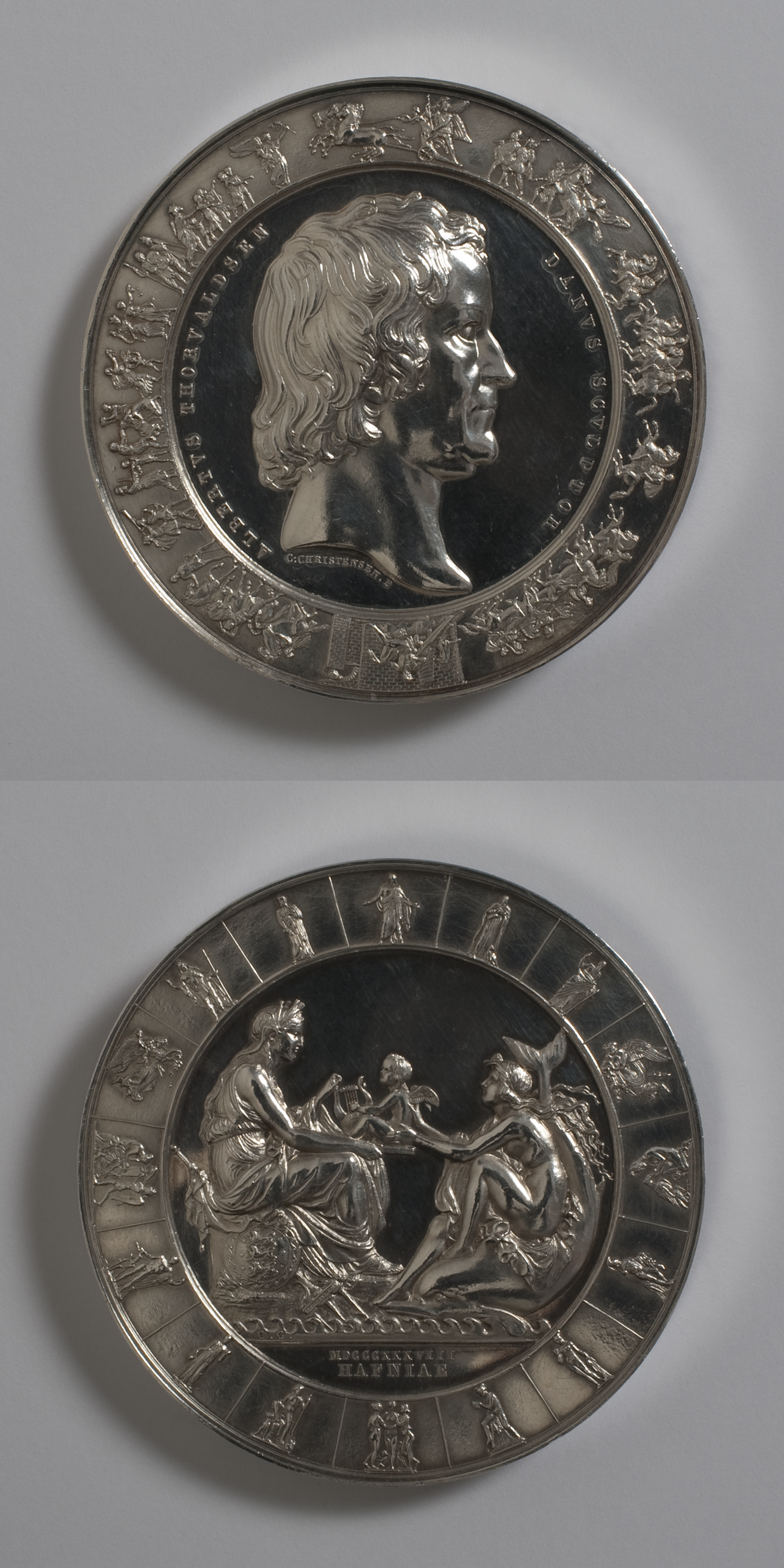
Thorvaldsen Medal, 1838

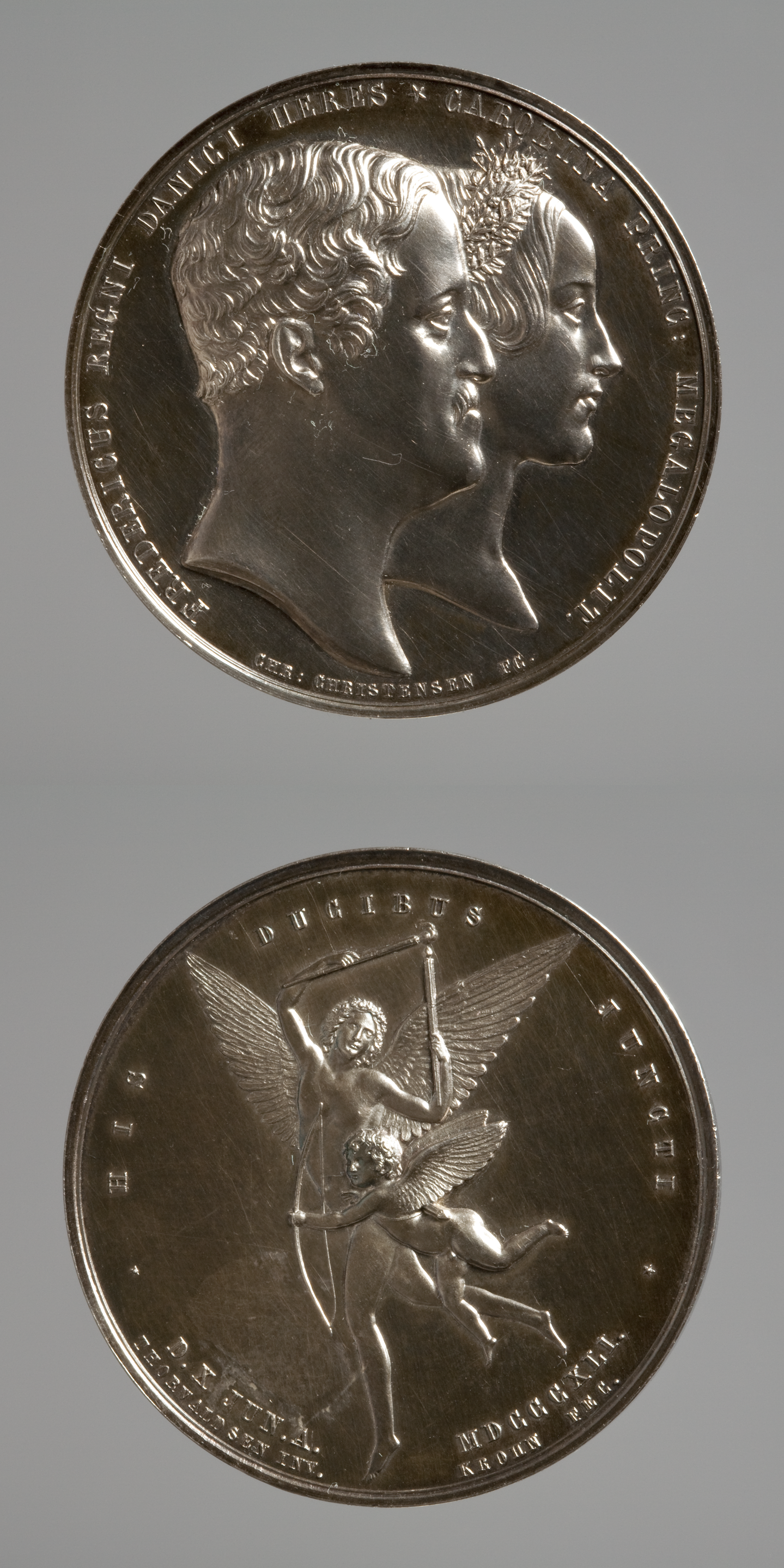
Prince Frederik (VII) and Princess Mariane Caroline Charlotte, 1841

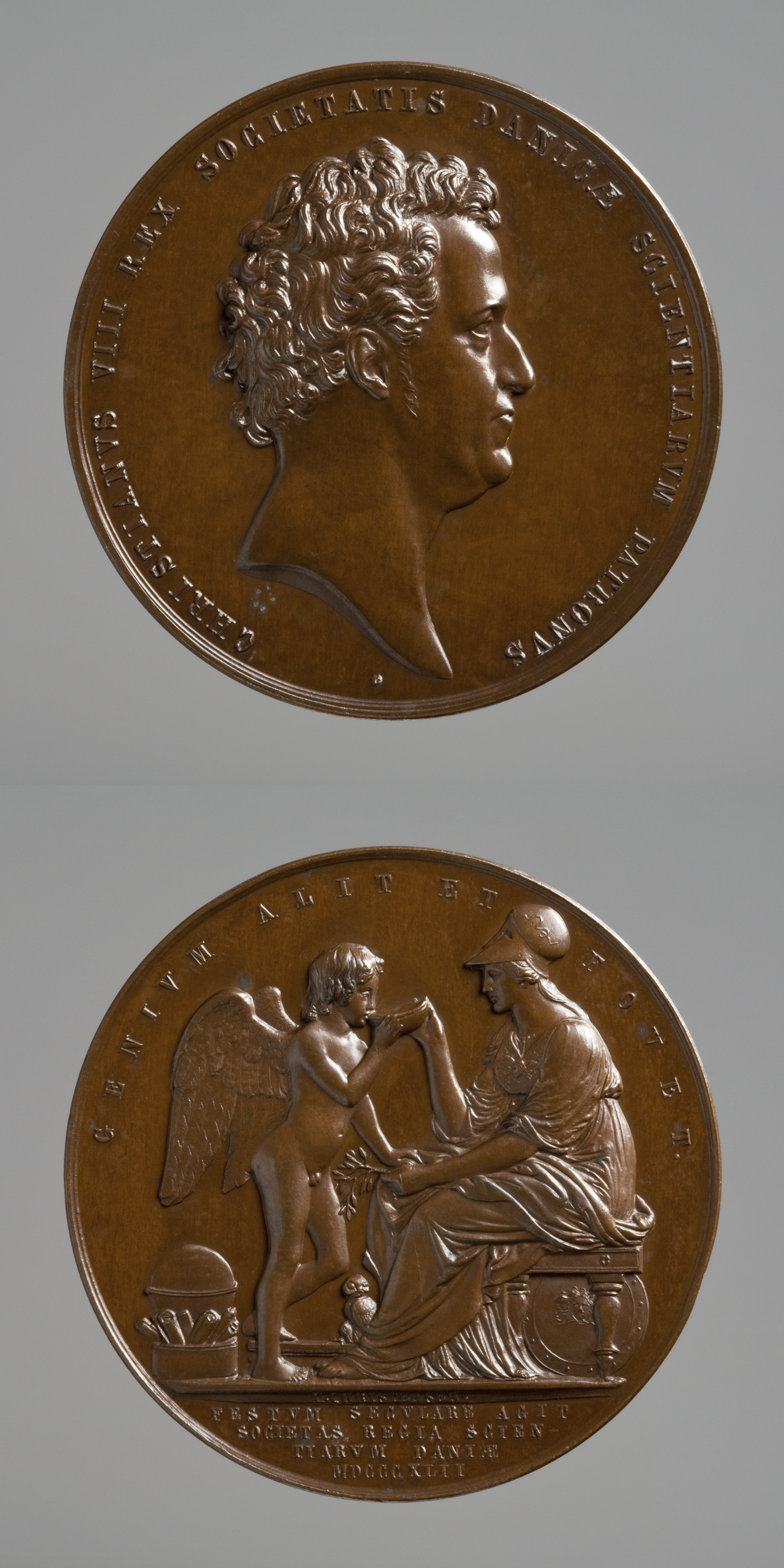
Christian VIII Medal, 1842
