= Viera Collaro =

Slovak-Danish artist (born 1946)

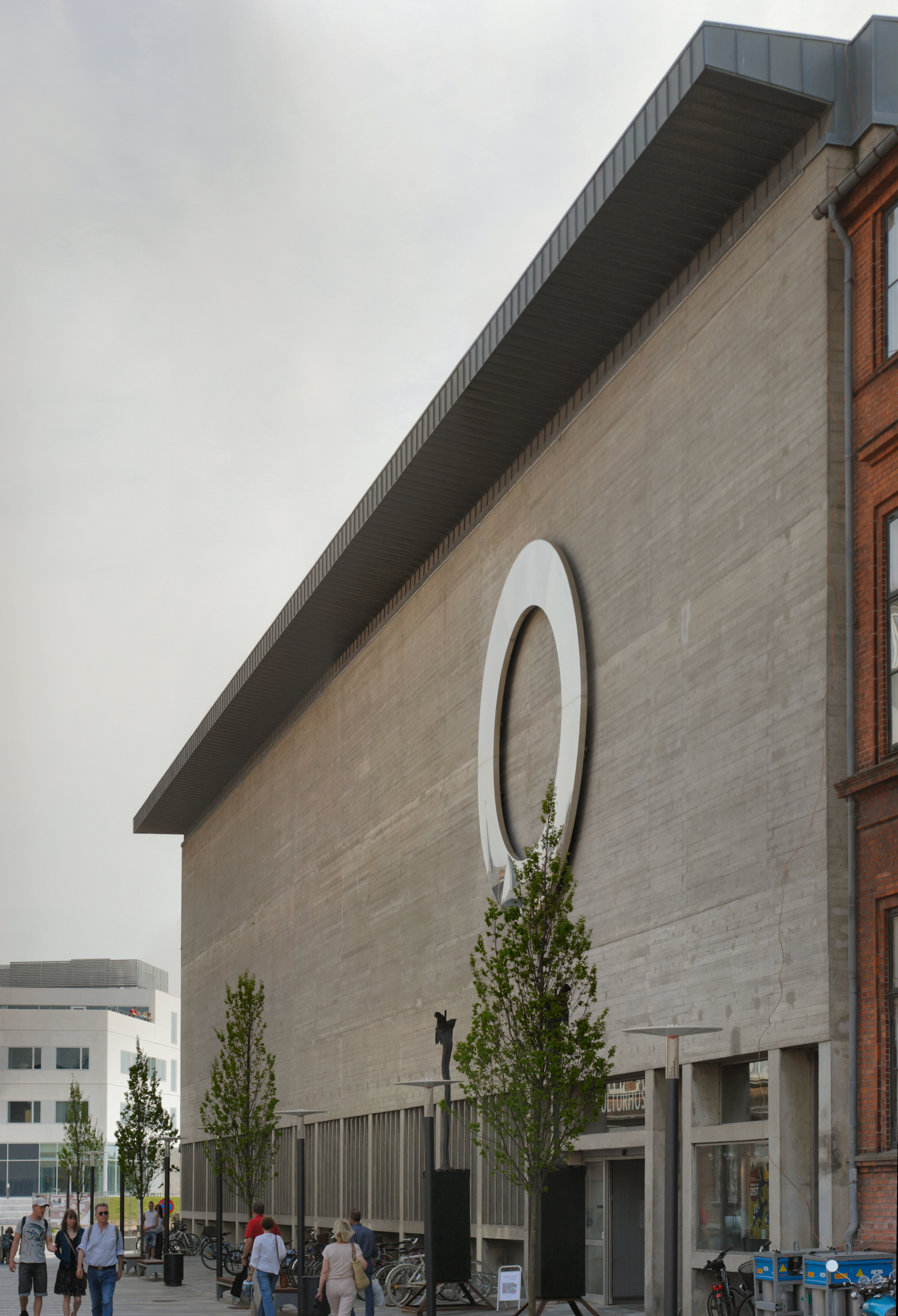
Collaro's Ringen (1998), Kulturhuset, Randers

Viera Collaro (born 1946) is a Slovak-Danish artist whose work in light art relies on the effects of light on colour, space and reflection. In addition to her artworks and installations, since the early 1990s she has decorated a number of Danish buildings including Copenhagen University's South Campus on Amager. In 2002, she was awarded the Eckersberg Medal and in 2015, she received the prestigious Thorvaldsen Medal.

== Biography ==
The daughter of a Slovak mother and a Greek father, Collaro was born in Bratislava, then part of Czechoslovakia, on 30 June 1946. She studied at the University of Michigan and at the Royal Danish Academy of Fine Arts. Working in the United States in the 1960s, she came under the influence of minimalism, pop art and concept art. In particular, she was inspired by the artists Frank Stella and Robert Rauschenberg while her adoption of neon lighting as an art form was based on the work of Dan Flavin. Her familiarization with Danish culture has stemmed in part from her membership since 1991 of the art groups Ny Abstraktion and Grønningen.

Collaro was fascinated by the thriving activity in the city of Copenhagen with all its lights and reflections. The extent to which they influenced her work can be seen in her creations which frequently combine painting, three-dimensional objects and fluorescent tubes. Geometrical figures are also a feature of her work, used either systematically or intuitively. Her 1000 farver (1000 Colours), created in 1979 in collaboration with Niels Nedergaard, has been exhibited in the National Gallery of Denmark's permanent exhibition (2015–16).

Collaro is considered a pioneer in the integration of light art and architecture. One of her earlier architectural works is Ringen (the Ring, 1998) on the façade of Kulturhuset (The House of Culture) in Randers. Among her later architectural achievements are light art applications in Aarhus University (2000), Avedøre Kraftværk 2 (2001), the University of Copenhagen (2003), the Technical University of Denmark (2004), Plejecentret Violskrænten, Grenå (2012), and the Danish Security and Intelligence Service, Søborg (2013). Art museums throughout Denmark have hosted her solo exhibitions.
