= Hans Michael Therkildsen =

Danish painter

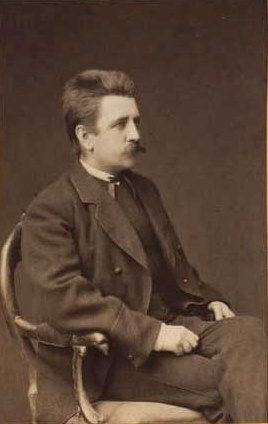
Hans Michael Therkildsen (1871)

Hans Michael Therkildsen (3 November 1850 - 4 June 1925) was a Danish painter.

== Early life ==
Michael Therkildsen was born at Lystrup near Horsens, Denmark. A son of farmer Therkild Nielsen and Karen (née Hendriksen), Therkildsen learnt to draw at the technical school in Horsens after which he attended the Royal Danish Academy of Fine Arts from 1868-1874. For some time, he received private tuition from Constantin Hansen. He furthered his education at Kunstnernes Frie Studieskoler where he was supervised by the painters Laurits Tuxen and Frans Schwartz.

== Career ==
He had his debut at the Charlottenborg Spring Exhibition with Et Bondehus (1875) and painted street life pictures in the years from 1876-1878. In 1879, he painted 3 Piger (1879) which along with two other pictures was bought by Kunstforeningen. He preferred painting rural scenes and soon discovered his increasing interest in depicting animals. He also became a capable landscape painter, having a particular skill for representing men and animals and the space surrounding them as can be seen in En ung Pige, som giver en Hest Brød (1880).

In 1880, Therkildsen undertook a trip to Paris where he stayed for a while, receiving important inputs from artistic currents in France. He developed his technique and his use of colour during his stay. In 1882 and 1884, he also travelled, making it to Italy on a stipend from the academy.

He received an exhibition medal for his major work, Køerne vandes (1887), exhibited at the Charlottenborg Spring Exhibition. In that year, the National Gallery of Denmark acquired its first of his paintings, Kaade Heste (1887). Heste i Dyrehaven (1884) which is also in the national gallery shows Therkildsens ability to create a joint harmony of figures and landscape.

He won the Neuhausen Prize in 1877. He was awarded a silver medal at the Exposition Universelle (1889) in Paris. In 1916 he became a Knight of Order of the Dannebrog. He died in Copenhagen and was buried in Vestre Kirkegård.

== Museums ==
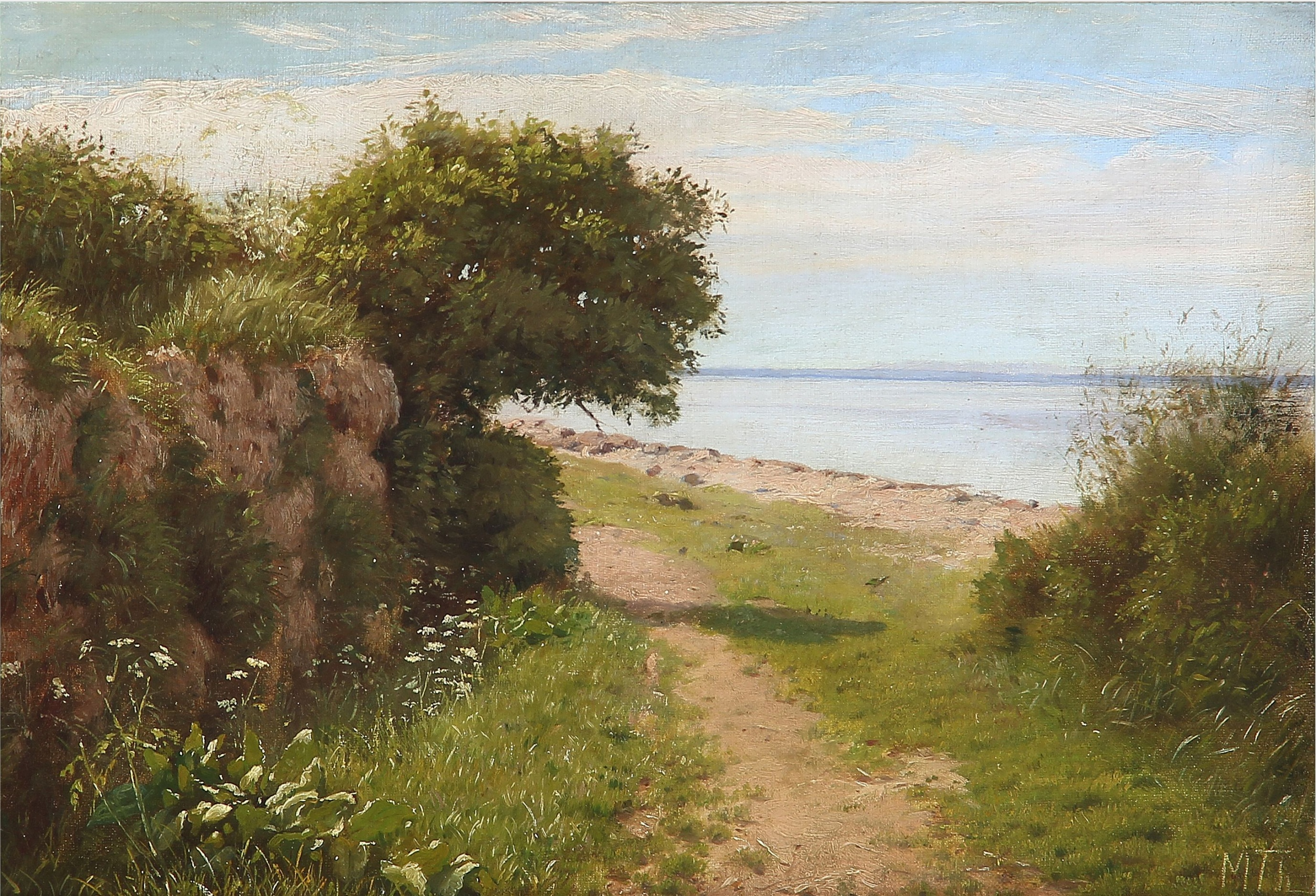
Road with a View of the Sea

Hans Michael Therkildsen is represented at the following museums in Denmark:

- ARoS Aarhus Kunstmuseum
- Bornholm Art Museum
- Fuglsang Art Museum
- Funen Art Museum
- Hirschsprung Collection
- KUNSTEN Museum of Modern Art Aalborg
- Ribe Kunstmuseum
- National Gallery of Denmark
- Trapholt
