= Torben Ebbesen =

Danish sculptor and painter (born 1945)

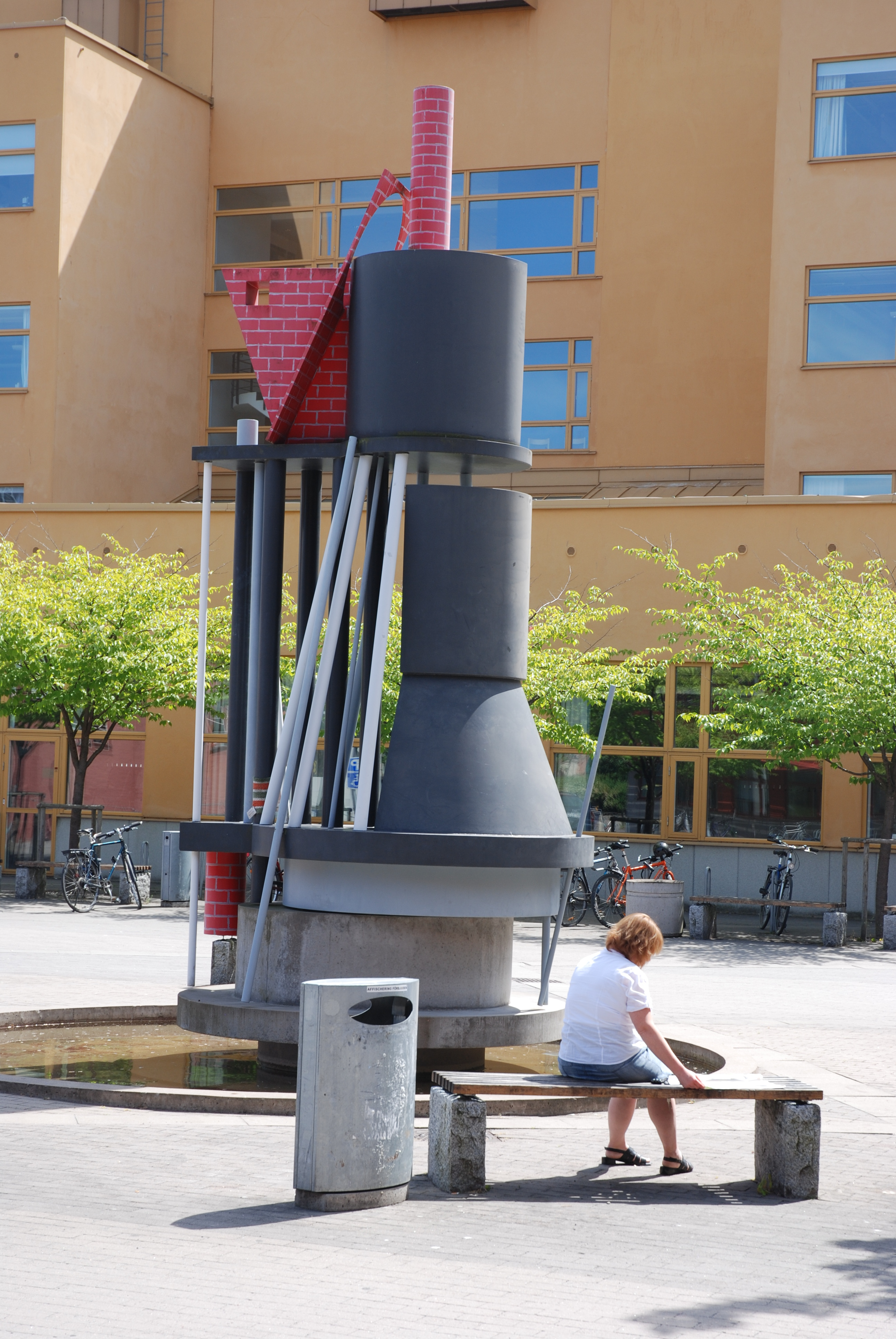
Torben Ebbesen:Topos (1997) in Jönköping, Sweden

Torben Niels Ebbesen (born 10 July 1945) is a Danish sculptor and painter. His installations in contrasting materials and other abstract works can be seen in locations in Denmark, Germany and Sweden as well as in several Danish museums.

== Early life and education ==
Born in Haderslev, Ebbesen began his artistic education in 1964 at the Kunsthåndværkerskolen in Copenhagen. In 1967, he moved to Italy where he first worked for an advertising agency before joining a soul band as a saxophonist for a year. As he toured Italy with the band, he prepared to enter the Royal Danish Academy of Fine Arts on his return to Copenhagen. At the Academy, he studied under Egill Jacobsen, Richard Mortensen and Palle Nielsen, graduating in 1975.

== Career ==
From 1976 to 1984, he was a member of the Ny Abstraktion group founded by Margrete Sørensen where he became interested in three-dimensional art. In parallel, he studied history of art at the University of Copenhagen while working as cultural correspondent for the newspaper Information.

In the 1970s, he was initially influenced by the Russian Constructivist painters Vladimir Tatlin and Kazimir Malevich. He then became increasingly interested in installations, using wood, iron bars, tiles, rubber and other industrial materials. In his Axis Mundi (1980), he expressed the inner "nirvana" while attempting to depict the individual's outer view of the world. A trip to Japan in the 1980s inspired him to adopt a more metaphysical approach to his work in line with the teachings of Zen Buddhism. This is apparent in his Reflektor (2005) in Emdrup. Made of mirror glass, the work lies on the steps of an amphitheatre, depicting the effects of weather and time.

In addition to public works in Denmark, Germany and Sweden, Ebbesen's creations can be seen in museums across Denmark.

== Awards ==
In 1991, Ebbesen was awarded the Eckersberg Medal and, in 1999, the Thorvaldsen Medal.
