= Mogens Andersen =

Danish painter

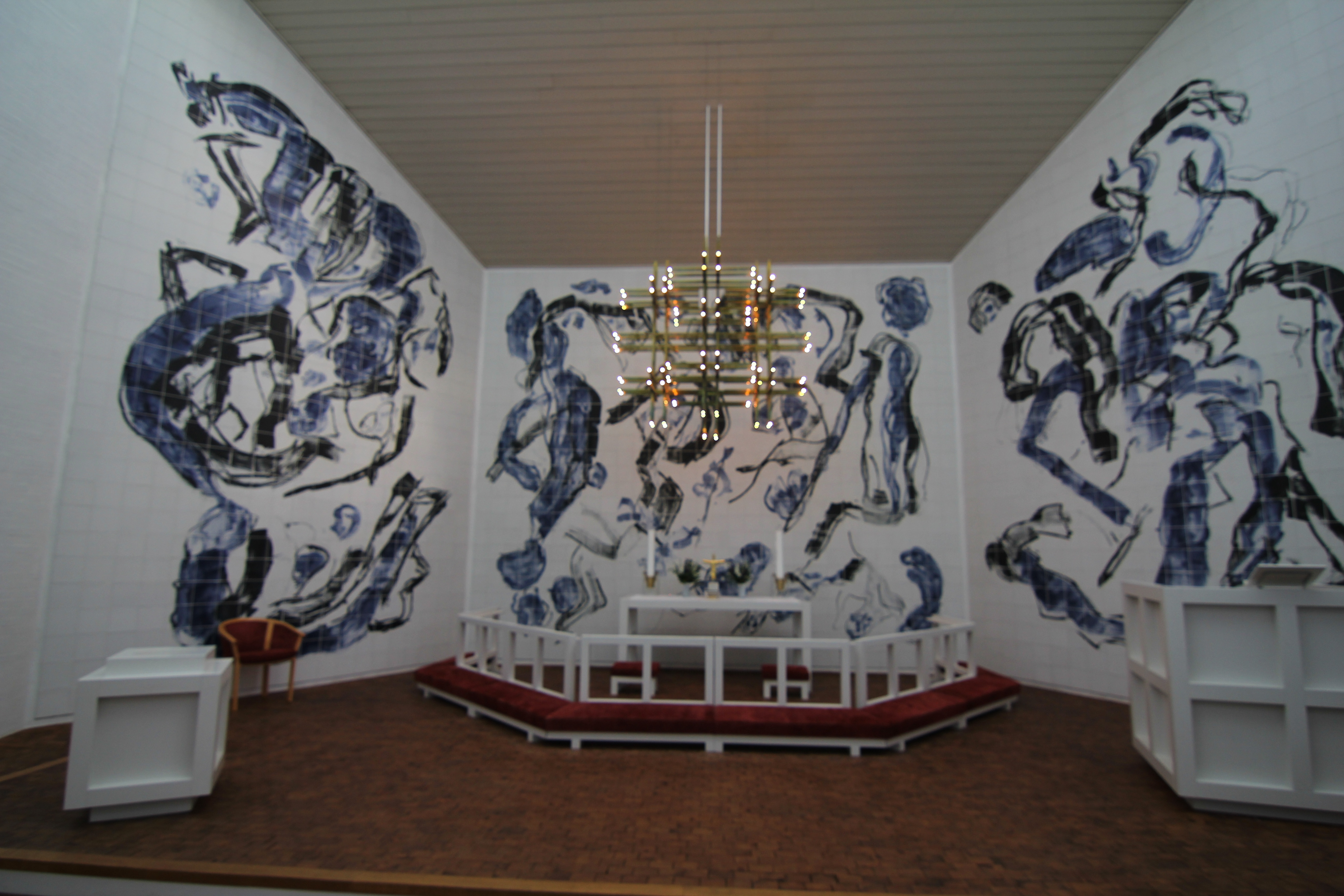
Mogen Andersen's decorations in Sejs-Svejbæk Church (1990)

Mogens Helge Thestrup Andersen (8 August 1916 – 18 April 2003) was a Danish painter.

== Biography ==
Born in Copenhagen, Andersen studied painting at P. Rostrup Bøyesen's art school (1933–39). He first exhibited at Kunstnernes Efterårsudstilling in 1935. His early works were earthy-coloured figure paintings but he was more interested in French Modernism. After the Second World War, he spent lengthy periods in Paris until 1965, where he was attracted by Abstract art. Thanks to his friendship with Pierre Soulages and Jean Bazaine, he developed a style of dark arabesques on a light background.

Andersen's first major work in Denmark was Abstract decoration in the Central Library on Kultorvet (1959) which caused considerable discussion but there was more solid appreciation of his later assignments, including the Bochum Museum of Art (1981) and Sejs-Svejbæk Church near Silkeborg (1990).

== Awards ==
In 1949, Andersen was awarded the Eckersberg Medal and, in 1984, the Thorvaldsen Medal.

== Literature ==
Hornung, Peter Michael; Andersen, Mogens (1991). Mogens Andersen: kunstneren i sin tid. Politiken. ISBN 978-87-567-4896-4.
