= Christian Zacho =

Danish landscape painter

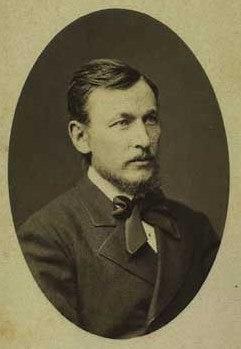
Christian Zacho, photographed in 1867

Peter Mørch Christian Zacho, usually known as Christian Zacho, (31 March 1843, in Grenå – 19 March 1913, in Hellerup) was a Danish landscape painter who is remembered for his idyllic scenes of Danish beech woods.

== Early life ==
His education at the Royal Danish Academy of Fine Arts from 1862 to 1867 was followed by additional instruction under P. C. Skovgaard and Vilhelm Kyhn who was particularly successful in communicating a grandiose style which allowed Zacho to benefit from new artistic trends. When he was 30, he went to Italy with Anton Thiele, Otto Haslund and Christian Blanche, visiting the Vienna World Exposition on his return in 1873. He was particularly impressed by the French landscape painters, especially those from the Barbizon school, whose work he saw in Vienna. He spent a year with Léon Bonnat in Paris (1875–76) together with Godfred Christensen and William Groth, creating interest for French art and culture in Denmark. Together with P. S. Krøyer, he spent a summer in Brittany.

== Career ==
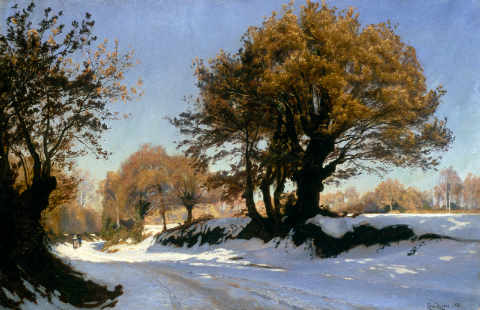
Christian Zacho: Winter Scene in Brittany; First Snow (1881)

Zacho began to exhibit at Charlottenborg as early as 1865 with En Septemberdag (A September Day) painted in Jutland like most of his earlier works. Later landscapes were of Zealand, Møn and Bornholm. Some of his most successful works are those of woods in the springtime where streams run under tree tops bathed in sunlight. Two of his most appreciated works are his painting of Vinterbillede fra Bretagne, Den første Sne (The First Snow, 1881) and Et stille Vand i Dyrehaven (Quiet Waters in the Dyrhave, 1884). His works can only be described as talented. From a historical viewpoint, his paintings from France, executed with a well-developed technique and a strong sense of colour, are important as they give us a better understanding of the painters who followed in his footsteps. A good example is Vinterbillede fra Bretagne (Winter Scene from Brittany), 1881). Zacho continued to follow the style of the older generation of French landscape painters, especially Théodore Rousseau. There is no sign of Impressionism in his work as can be seen from his paintings of Brittany. Taken as a whole, he work can be said to fall in the Danish landscape tradition. His paintings of Bornholm and Zealand are delicately conceived but are a little conservative. In later life, he also painted portraits. He is however remembered above all for his more traditional, idyllic works which often depicted scenes of Danish beech woods. Zacho was awarded the Thorvaldsen Medal in 1884.

== Awards ==
Zacho was awarded the Thorvaldsen Medal in 1884 for his Et stille Vand i Dyrehaven.
