= Karl Jensen (painter) =

Danish painter

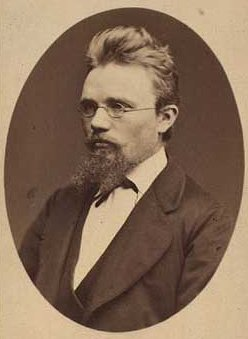
Karl Jensen (1876)

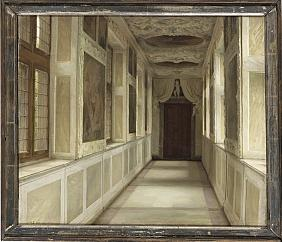
Corridor in Frederiksborg Castle (1907)

Karl Georg Jensen (22 November 1851 – 23 May 1933) was a Danish painter. He is remembered for his landscapes of northern Zealand and for his architectural interiors.

== Biography ==
Born in Holstebro, Jensen studied painting at the Royal Danish Academy of Fine Arts, graduating in 1879. He also received private tuition from Harald Foss and in the early 1880s assisted Lorenz Frølich with his decorations in Frederiksborg Palace.

In the 1880s, he became interested in architectural painting and created colourful interiors for churches and palaces such as Audenssalen på Rosenborg (Audience Hall at Rosenborg, 1889). Karl Madsen aroused his interest in world art, leading him to study Japanese art while in Paris in 1889. From 1892, he was a member of Den Frie Udstilling.

Jensen was not very productive but his work comprising some 200 paintings has placed him among Denmark's most significant colourists, on a par with Christen Købke. His Landskab fra Næstvedegnen (1884) is considered a masterpiece but he also painted several other noteworthy landscapes of northern and western Zealand. The picturesque detail of his architectural paintings of church and palace interiors is also worthy of note.

== Awards ==
In 1926, Jensen was awarded the Thorvaldsen Medal.

== Literature ==
- Nielsen, Hanna (1995). I skyggen af de andre: maleren Karl Jansen, 1851-1933. Holstebro Museum. ISBN 978-87-87522-32-8.
