= Peter Alsing Nielsen =

Danish painter

Poul Peter Knud Augustinus Alsing Nielsen (21 May 1907 – 11 April 1985) was a Danish painter. Born in Frederikssund, he studied painting and graphic art at the Royal Danish Academy of Fine Arts from 1930.

Initially interested in landscape painting, he depicted scenes around Kalvehave in the south of Zealand where he grew up. After moving to Copenhagen, he was attracted by subjects in the harbour area including tin shacks, piles of scrap metal or industrial buildings. As a result, he was nicknamed Bølgebliksmaleren (the corrugated iron painter). His works in subdued colour are painted with simple yet precise lines, in a somewhat abstract style. In 1971, Alsing Nielsen was awarded the Thorvaldsen Medal.

== Literature ==
- Nielsen, Peter Alsing; Jensen, Helle; Rønnebæksholm (2006). Tilbageblik på bølgeblik - Peter Alsing Nielsen (in Danish). Rønnebæksholm Kunst- og Kulturcenter. ISBN 978-87-990067-7-9.
