= Dan Sterup-Hansen =

Danish painter and illustrator

Dan Sterup-Hansen (3 October 1918 – 2 July 1995) was a Danish painter and illustrator.

== Biography ==
Born near Holbæk in northeastern Zealand, Sterup-Hansen was the son of the painter Adler Sterup Hansen. As a teenager, together with his friend Albert Mertz, he painted or drew scenes of Tivoli and Dyrehave which he exhibited in a Copenhagen gallery. In 1936, after taking a preparatory course with Bizzie Høyer at the Copenhagen Technical School, he entered the Royal Danish Academy of Fine Arts, benefiting from the teaching of Aksel Jørgensen and Georg Jacobsen. He studied first at the Academy's school of painting (1936–39) and later at the school of graphic art (1943–44). He completed his education at André Lhote's school in Paris in 1950.

Although Sterup-Hansen had begun to exhibit at Kunstnernes Efterårsudstilling in 1936, it was the painting Krigsblinde (War Blind), inspired by a procession of blind war victims he saw in France, which earned him the Eckersberg Medal. His many paintings of railway stations show how he stuck to a given theme for experimentation. While his early works have a strict linear style, they became increasingly more free in both line and composition, as evidenced by his etchings of Undervandssvømmere (Underwater Swimmers, 1957).

Other notable works by Sterup-Hansen include the altarpiece in Vellinge Church (1971) which consists of six paintings including two from the church's original altarpiece. Although small, the paintings are vividly coloured, especially the central frame of the Last Supper. Another notable works is his Befrielsesregeringen 1945 (Liberation Government 1945) in Christiansborg Palace (1985–91) depicting both politicians and the royal family.

== Awards ==
In 1952, Sterup-Hansen was awarded the Eckersberg Medal and, in 1979, the Thorvaldsen Medal. He was decorated a Knight of the Order of the Dannebrog in 1967 and a Knight 1st Class in 1980.
