= Sven Dalsgaard =

Danish painter, sculptor, and writer

Sven Dalsgaard Jensen (29 May 1914 – 22 January 1999) was a Danish painter, sculptor and writer.

== Biography ==
Born in Vorup near Randers, Dalsgaard was self-taught as a painter. His earliest paintings are Naturalistic but around 1934 he was inspired by Wassily Kandinsky and Paul Klee to paint more Abstract works. He debuted at the Kunstnernes Efterårsudstilling in 1943. Inspired by Marcel Duchamp, he embarked on Surrealism in the 1940s but moved into a simpler, more stylized approach in the 1950s, producing tall thin sculptures which he soon included in his paintings, for example Kristus fra Randers 1 (Christ from Randers 1, 1954).

== Awards ==
In 1978, Dalsgaard was awarded the Thorvaldsen Medal.
