= Janus la Cour =

Danish painter (1837–1909)

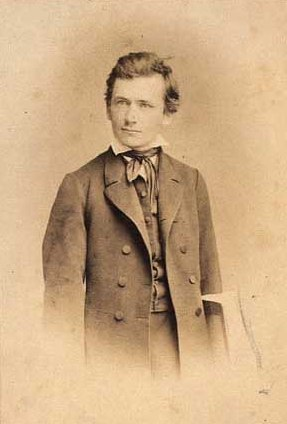
Janus la Cour

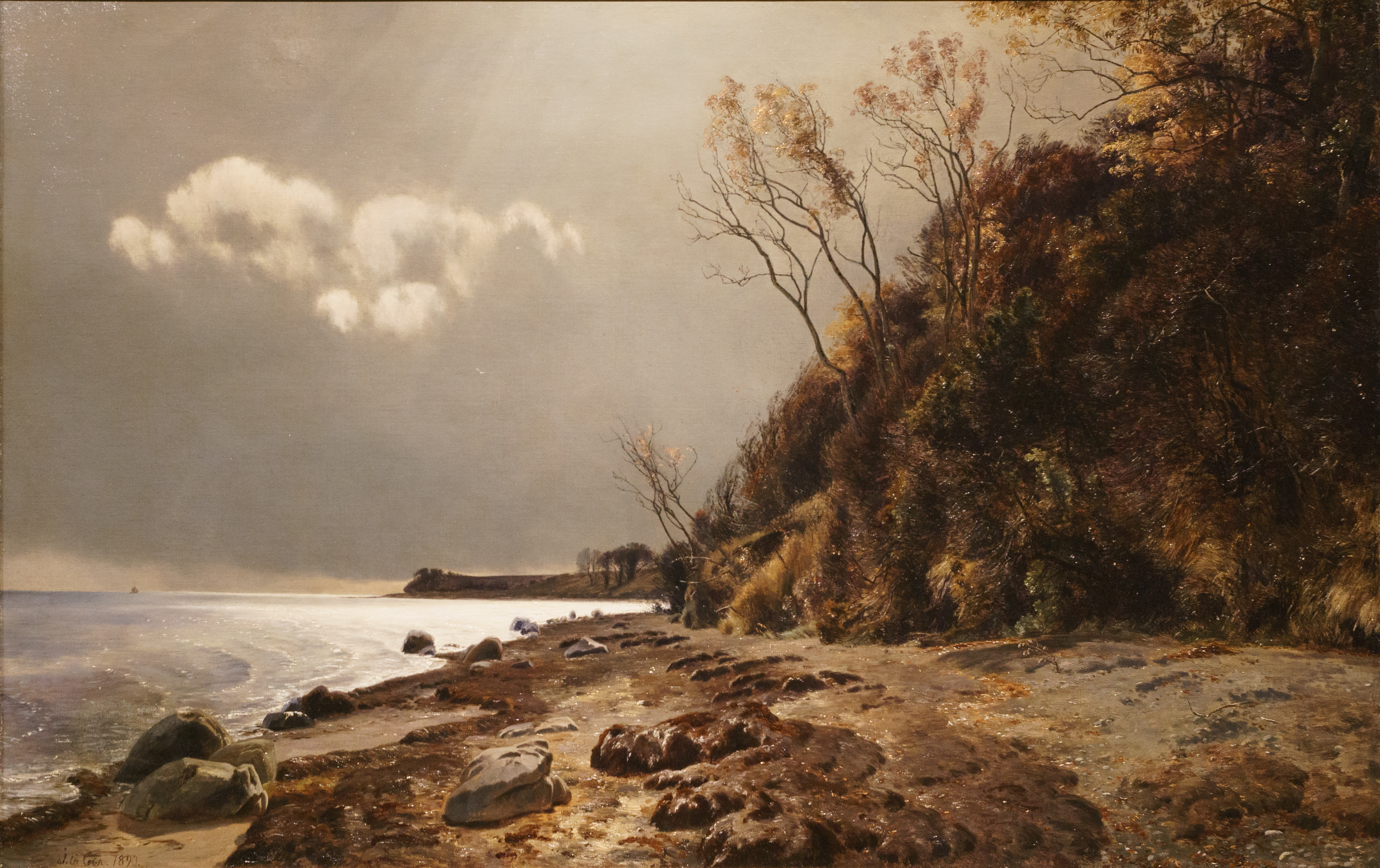
Janus la Cour: Moesgård Strand (1890)

Janus Andreas Bartholin la Cour (5 September 1837 – 13 October 1909) was a Danish painter who is remembered for his landscapes painted in the classical style of the Eckersberg school.

== Biography ==
Born near Ringkøbing, he spent much of his early life in the Aarhus area, attending Aarhus Latin School where he was introduced to painting by Emmerik Høegh-Guldberg and his apprentice Christen Købke. In 1853, he moved to Copenhagen where he studied privately under Wilhelm Marstrand and, from 1856, under P.C. Skovgaard who was particularly important for his artistic development and became a personal friend. From 1861 to 1884, la Cour lived with the Skovgaard family in Copenhagen. He attended the Royal Danish Academy of Fine Arts from 1857 to 1864.

During several trips to Italy, he painted landscapes of Lake Nemi and Tivoli. In Denmark, he painted scenes from eastern Jutland, especially the area around Aarhus and Silkeborg, often in rainy or stormy weather. From 1884, he lived in Mariendal near Beder south of Aarhus and in 1888 settled for the rest of his life in Langballegård near Mårslet. He purposely distanced himself from the Copenhagen-scene where more modern trends in painting en plein air were breaking the Academic traditions of the Eckersberg school.

Several of la Cour's paintings are in the collection of Statens Museum for Kunst.

== Awards ==
La Cour was awarded the Thorvaldsen Medal in 1871. He was decorated with the Order of the Dannebrog in 1892.

== Literature ==
- Magnussen, Rikard (1927). Landskabsmaleren Janus La Cour 1837 - 1909. Foreningen for National Kunst.
