= Elof Risebye =

Danish painter

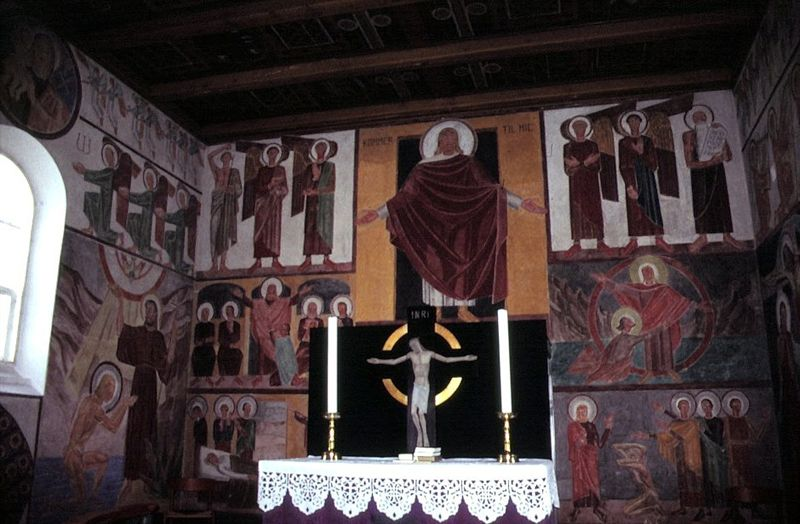
Risebye's chancel decorations in Sindal Church (1921)

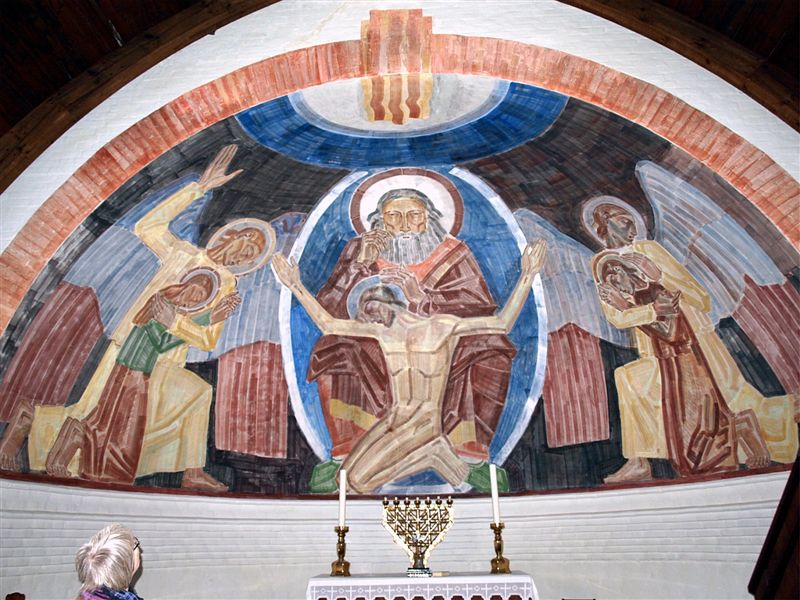
Risebye's apsis decorations in Gedser Church (1925)

Elof Christian Risebye (3 April 1892 – 11 July 1961) was a Danish painter. He became known as the "painter of grief" (sorgens maler) for his paintings of coffins and corpses in the 1930s.

== Biography ==
Born in the Frederiksberg district of Copenhagen, from 1905 to 1913 he lived in the United States, studying at the Art Institute of Chicago (1910–12). On returning to Denmark, he attended the school of painting at Royal Danish Academy of Fine Arts as a student of Viggo Johansen and Julius Paulsen. From 1919 to 1921, he studied under Joakim Skovgaard at the school of decoration.

Riseby decorated several churches with frescos, including Sindal (1921), St Mark's, Copenhagen (1924) and Gedser Church (1925). In 1925, he helped Skovgaard decorate Lund Cathedral with mosaics and, in the 1930s, he contributed to Einar Nielsen's mosaics in the Royal Danish Theatre's new Stærekassen building.

The series 7 Billeder malet ved en vens død (Seven Pictures Painted on a Friend's Death) painted after his friend, the sculptor Paul Kiærskou, died in 1933 marked a particularly important step in his career. It was the beginning of the gloomy motifs of dead figures and coffins which gave him the name Painter of Grief. The painting Ved en kiste (At a Coffin, 1934) is notable for the way in which its almost black colouring depicts a man struck with feelings of guilt, showing how his sensitive hands are held over his mouth and one of his eyes. From 1924, Risebye taught at the Academy's decoration school, becoming a professor in 1949.

Elof Risebye's works have been widely exhibited over the years both in Denmark and abroad, most recently in Vejen Kunstmuseum in 2009.

== Awards ==
In 1942, Risebye was awarded the Eckersberg Medal and, in 1952, the Thorvaldsen Medal.

== Literature ==
- Nielsen, Teresa (2009). Risebye + Kiærskou (in Danish). Vejen Kunstmuseum. ISBN 978-87-87316-46-0.
