= Freddie A. Lerche =

Danish painter (born 1937)

Freddie Alexander Lerche (born 2 October 1937) is a Danish painter. His use of colour is devoid of any specific function, providing his paintings with a deep, material character. In 2012, he was awarded the Thorvaldsen Medal.

== Biography ==
Born in Copenhagen, Lerche is the son of a sales representative and a women's hairdresser. A self-taught painter, over the years he has experimented with the use of colour. Completely avoiding motifs, he rigorously aims at making colour the principal means of conveying a message. On the basis of Minimal Art theories, Lerche considers colour rather than motif to be the main component in a painting. His monochrome canvasses are often reworked several times, allowing the additional shades to play against the underlying tone.

In Lerche's own words: "The painting does not contain any message as a bottle contains wine. The painting is the message." His colour-toned paintings are often arranged in series, each canvas carefully attuned to the others. In 1986, he decorated the ferry MS Niels Klim, performing his work as a total entity, from the top of ship to the bottom. The work included formica sections on the walls of the passenger deck and iron plates representing seaweed on the car deck. He also decorated the Nordjysk Musikkonservatorium (Academy of Music, Aalborg).

Lerche first exhibited at the Artists' Autumn Exhibition in 1960. Since 1981, he has been a member of Den Frie Udstilling.

== Awards ==
In 1989 he was awarded the Eckersberg Medal and in 2011 the Thorvaldsen Medal.
