= Georg Jacobsen =

Danish painter

Georg Jacobsen (17 September 1887 – 14 February 1976) was a Danish painter.

Jacobsen studied under Viggo Johansen at the Royal Danish Academy of Fine Arts in Copenhagen from 1906 to 1911. He later spent time in Paris, from 1919 to 1935, as well as Italy and Spain. From 1935 to 1940 he worked at the Norwegian National Academy of Fine Arts. He is represented with six works in the National Gallery of Norway.
