= Palle Nielsen =

Danish illustrator and graphic artist

Palle Louis Nielsen (8 August 1920 – 5 September 2000) was a Danish illustrator and graphic artist. Considered to be one of the masters of his times, his works include drawings, watercolours, woodcuts and linocuts.

== Biography ==
Born in Copenhagen, Nielsen was brought up in the harbour area of the old town. Nielsen attended Kunsthåndværkerskolen (School of Arts and Crafts) from 1937 to 1939. Thereafter he studied privately under Aksel Jørgensen before entering the painting school at the Royal Danish Academy of Fine Arts (1945–47). In 1946, he married the graphic artist Elsa Nielsen.

Nielsen first exhibited at the Charlottenborg Spring Exhibition in 1949. During the course of the 1950s, he gained a reputation as one of Denmark's foremost graphic artists working with a wide variety of art forms including woodcuts, linocuts, etching, lithography, monotyping as well as with pen, paper and watercolours. A recurring theme in his work is the existence of modern man. His striking urban and technological landscapes present a mixture of splendor and horror, exposing the root causes of war and violence. In 1950, he visited Hamburg which inspired his early Orfeus og Eurydike (Orpheus and Euridice) illustrations. First published in book form in 1959, the work contains 53 linocuts. When it was republished in 1970 in a smaller format, it firmly established Nielsen's reputation.

Nielsen's etchings and prints appear in a developing series of works, the most important being Den fortryllede by (The Endangered City, 1953), Alter for en by (Altar for a City, 1969), Den sovende by (The Sleeping City, 1955-1957), Parklanded (Park County, 1972), Nekropolis (Necropolis, 1970), Lethe (1985), Den store Verdensbunker (The Great World Bunker, 1950), Narcissus and Miraklens tid (Age of Miracles, 1984–90). Shortly before his death, he summarized his philosophy as follows: "Man is good from the outset but then mismanagement sets in, and you become a scoundrel ... For if you obstruct existence, it will turn against you..."

From 1967 to 1973, Nielsen was a professor at the Royal Danish Academy of Fine Arts.

Over 700 works by Palle Nielsen are in the collections of Denmark's museums. His works can also be seen in the MoMA Museum of Modern Art in New York and in the British Museum and Victoria & Albert Museum in London.

== Awards ==
In 1958, Nielsen was the first contemporary Dane to receive an award at the Venice Biennale. He received many other awards including the Thorvaldsen Medal and the Prince Eugen Medal (both in 1963).

== Literature ==
- Eriksen, Svend (1957). Wood Engravings by Palle Nielsen.
- Nielsen, Palle; Jacobsen, Signe; Svensson, Gerda; Ulrike Koch-Brinkmann (2008). Palle Nielsen: Orfeus og Eurydike og andre værker. Vejle kunstmuseum. ISBN 978-87-7388-078-4.
- Rex, Jytte; Nielsen, Palle (2008). Palle Nielsen: Timebog. Gyldendal A/S. ISBN 978-87-02-04699-1.
- Wivel, Mikael; Nielsen, Palle (2002). Palle Nielsen in memoriam. Sophienholm. ISBN 978-87-87883-84-9.
