= Hein Heinsen =

Danish sculptor (born 1935)

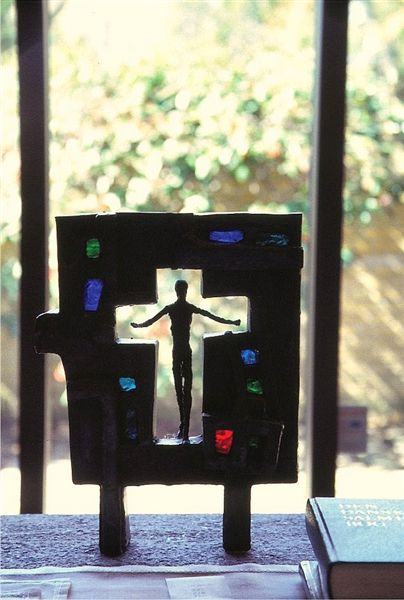
A crucifix designed by Hein Heinsen, located at Vestervang Church

Hein Olaf Heinsen (born July 23, 1935) is a Danish artist who has contributed to the Lutheran art of Scandinavia. He made his debut on the Danish art scene in the 1960s as part of the minimalistic movement. Heinsen served as a professor at The Royal Danish Academy of Fine Arts from 1980 to 1989. Heinsen has primarily been working with bronze sculptures and large installation projects since the mid-1980s.
