= List of Danish painters =

This is a list of Danish painters who were born in or whose creative production is associated with Denmark:

== A ==
- Axel Aabrink (1887–1965)
- Jørgen Aabye (1868–1959)
- Carl Frederik Aagaard (1833–1895)
- Nikolaj Abraham Abildgaard (1744–1809)
- Georg Achen (1860–1912)
- Else Alfelt (1910–1974)
- Peder Als (1725–1776)
- Peter Alsing Nielsen (1907–1985)
- Catherine Engelhart Amyot (1845–1926)
- Anna Ancher (1859–1935)
- Michael Ancher (1849–1927)
- Morten Andersen (born 1976)

== B ==
- Carl Baagøe (1829–1902)
- Otto Bache (1839–1927)
- Carl Balsgaard (1812–1893)
- Emil Bærentzen (1799–1868)
- Mogens Ballin (1871–1914)
- Magdalene Bärens (1737–1808)
- Poul Anker Bech (1942–2009)
- Wilhelm Bendz (1804–1832)
- Albert Bertelsen (1921–2019)
- Ejler Bille (1910–2004)
- Jens Birkholm (1869–1915)
- Wilhelm Bissen (1836–1913)
- Carl Heinrich Bloch (1834–1890)
- Lars Bo (1924–1999)
- Jørgen Boberg (1940–2009)
- Peter Brandes (1944–2025)
- Hans Andersen Brendekilde (1857–1942)
- Victor Brockdorff (1911–1992)
- Laura Brun-Pedersen (1883–1961)
- Johan Jacob Bruun (1715–1789)
- Eva Louise Buus (born 1979)

== C ==
- Emil Carlsen (1853–1932)
- Andreas Riis Carstensen (1844–1906)
- Ebba Carstensen (1885–1967)
- Johannes Carstensen (1924–2010)
- C.C.A. Christensen (1831–1912)
- Godfred Christensen (1845–1928)
- Poul Simon Christiansen (1855–1933)
- Franciska Clausen (1899–1986)
- Gad Frederik Clement (1867–1933)
- Janus la Cour (1837–1909)

== D ==
- Carl Dahl (1812–1865)
- Christen Dalsgaard (1824–1907)
- Sven Dalsgaard (1914–1999)
- Inger Lut Debois (1931–2015), painter
- Heinrich Dohm (1875–1940)
- Anton Dorph (1831–1914)
- Bertha Dorph (1875–1960)
- Dankvart Dreyer (1816–1852)

== E ==
- Christoffer Wilhelm Eckersberg (1783–1853)
- Heinrich Eddelien (1802–1852)
- Eiler Rasmussen Eilersen (1827–1912)
- Ib Eisner (1925–2003)
- Harald Rudyard Engman (1903–1968)
- Julius Exner (1825–1910)

== F ==
- Paul Gustave Fisher (1860–1934)
- Elna Fonnesbech-Sandberg (1892–1994)
- Johanna Marie Fosie (1726–1764)
- Wilhelm Freddie (1909–1995)
- Didrik Frisch (1836–1867)
- Cladius Detlev Fritzsch (1765–1841)
- Lorenz Frølich (1820–1908)
- Georg Mathias Fuchs (1719–1797)

== G ==
- Paul Gadegaard (1920–1996)
- Johan Vilhelm Gertner (1818–1871)
- Ib Geertsen (1919–2009)
- Emily Gernild (born 1985)
- Albert Gottschalk (1866–1906)
- Vilhelm Groth (1842–1899)

== H ==
- Erik Hagens (born 1940)
- Hans Jørgen Hammer (1815–1882)
- Svend Hammershøi (1873–1948)
- Vilhelm Hammershøi (1864–1916)
- Constantin Hansen (1804–1880)
- Hans Hansen (1769–1828)
- Heinrich Hansen (painter) (1821–1890)
- Peter Hansen (1868–1928)
- Otto Haslund (1842–1917)
- Arne Haugen Sørensen (born 1932)
- Sven Havsteen-Mikkelsen (1912–1999)
- Henry Heerup (1907–1993)
- Malene Heerup (born 1964)
- Ole Heerup (1934–2016)
- Ella Heide (1871–1956)
- Einar Hein (1875–1931)
- Hanne Hellesen (1801–1844)
- Erik Henningsen (1855–1930)
- Frants Henningsen (1850–1908)
- Marie Henriques (1866–1944)
- Sally Henriques (1815–1886)
- Carsten Henrichsen (1824–1897)
- Søren Hjorth Nielsen (1901–1983)
- Niels Peter Holbech (1804–1889)
- Johannes Holbek (1872–1903)
- Christian Holm (1804–1846)
- Heinrich Gustav Ferdinand Holm (1803–1861)
- Paul Høm (1905–1994)
- Christian Horneman (1765–1844)
- Johannes Holt-Iversen (born 1989)
- Sophie Holten (1858–1930), painter
- Suzette Holten (1863–1937), painter, ceramist
- Oluf Høst (1884–1966)
- Bizzie Høyer (1888–1971)
- Cornelius Høyer (1741–1804)
- Knud Hvidberg (1927–1986)
- Ejnar Hansen (painter) (1884–1965)

== I ==
- Peter Ilsted (1861–1933)
- Valdemar Irminger (1850–1938)
- Victor Isbrand (1897–1989)

== J ==
- Antonio Jacobsen (1850-1921)
- Egill Jacobsen (1910–1998)
- Georg Jacobsen (1887–1976)
- Robert Jacobsen (1912–1993)
- Ville Jais-Nielsen (1885–1949)
- Axel P. Jensen (1885–1972)
- Christian Albrecht Jensen (1792–1870)
- Johan Laurentz Jensen (1800–1856)
- Karl Jensen (1851–1933)
- Elisabeth Jerichau-Baumann (1819–1881)
- Harald Jerichau (1851–1878)
- August Jerndorff (1846–1906)
- Carl Ludwig Jessen (1833–1917)
- Svend Johansen (1890–1970)
- Asger Jorn (1914–1973)
- Jens Juel (1745–1802)

== K ==
- Ludvig Kabell (1853–1902)
- F.C. Kiærskou (1805–1891)
- Anton Eduard Kieldrup (1826–1869)
- Peter Nielsen Klitz (1874–1955)
- Helvig Kinch (1872–1956)
- Per Kirkeby (1938–2018)
- Kirsten Kjær (1893–1985)
- Anna Klindt Sørensen (1899–1985)
- Jesper Knudsen (born 1964)
- Christen Købke (1810–1848)
- Elise Konstantin-Hansen (1858–1946)
- John Kørner (born 1967)
- Hendrick Krock (1671–1738)
- Christian Krogh (1852–1925)
- Pietro Krohn (1840–1905)
- Marie Krøyer (1867–1940)
- Peder Severin Krøyer (1851–1909)
- Albert Küchler (1803–1886)
- Michael Kvium (born 1955)
- Vilhelm Kyhn (1819–1903)

== L ==
- Alhed Larsen (1872–1927)
- Emanuel Larsen (1823–1859)
- Johannes Larsen (1867–1961)
- Freddie A. Lerche (born 1937)
- Harald Leth (1899–1986)
- Georg Emil Libert (1820–1908)
- Christian August Lorentzen (1746–1828)
- Christine Løvmand (1803–1872)
- Jens Lund (1871–1924)
- J. L. Lund (1777–1867)
- Johan Thomas Lundbye (1818–1848)
- Anders Christian Lunde (1809–1886)
- Marie Luplau (1848–1925)
- Anne Marie Lütken (1916–2001)
- Julie Lütken (1788–1816)

== M ==
- Niels Macholm (1915–1997)
- Ernst Mahler (1797–1861)
- Lise Malinovsky (born 1957)
- Sonja Ferlov Mancoba (1911–1984)
- Wilhelm Marstrand (1810–1873)
- Anton Melbye (1818–1875)
- Fritz Melbye (1826–1869)
- Vilhelm Melbye (1824–1882)
- Albert Mertz (1920–1990)
- Ernst Meyer (1797–1861)
- Jens Peter Møller (1783–1854)
- Mogens Møller (1934–2021)
- Valdemar Schønheyder Møller (1864–1905)
- David Monies (1812–1894)
- Christian Mølsted (1862–1930)
- Peder Mørk Mønsted (1859–1941)
- Richard Mortensen (1910–1993)
- Adam August Müller (1811–1844)
- Emilie Mundt (1842–1922)

== N ==
- Elisabeth Neckelmann (1884–1956)
- Hermania Neergaard (1799–1875)
- Rasmus Nellemann (1923–2004)
- Arthur Nielsen (1883–1946)
- Ejnar Nielsen (1872–1956)
- Jais Nielsen (1885–1961)
- Valdemar Nielsen (1894-1970)
- Thorvald Niss (1842–1905)
- Emil Normann (1798–1881)
- Ernestine Nyrop (1888–1975)

== O ==
- Henrik Olrik (1830–1890)
- John Olsen (1938–2019)
- Erik Ortvad (1917–2008)
- Ovartaci (1894 – 1985)

== P ==
- Vilhelm Pacht (1843–1912)
- Erik Pauelsen (1749–1790)
- Julius Paulsen (1860–1940)
- Carl-Henning Pedersen (1913–2007)
- Sophie Pedersen (1885–1850)
- Vilhelm Pedersen (1820–1859)
- Anna Petersen (1845–1910)
- Edvard Petersen (1841–1911)
- Leif Sylvester Petersen (born 1940)
- Vilhelm Petersen (1812–1880)
- Fritz Petzholdt (1805–1838)
- Theodor Philipsen (1840–1920)
- Lars Physant (born 1957)
- Camille Pissarro (1830–1903)
- Gudrun Poulsen (1918–1999)
- Bolette Puggaard (1798–1847)

== R ==
- Pia Ranslet (born 1956)
- Tal R (born 1967)
- Erik Raadal (1905–1941)
- Johannes Rach (1720–1783)
- Carl Rasmussen (1841–1893)
- Louise Ravn-Hansen (1849–1909)
- Jytte Rex (born 1942)
- L.A. Ring (1854–1933)
- Elof Risebye (1892–1961)
- Jørgen Roed (1808–1888)
- Johan Rohde (1856–1935)
- Martinus Rørbye (1803–1848)
- Vilhelm Rosenstand (1838–1915)
- Godtfred Rump (1816–1880)

== S ==
- August Schiøtt (1823–1895)
- Alfred Schmidt (1858–1938)
- Ludvig Abelin Schou (1838–1867)
- Peter Alfred Schou (1844–1914)
- Ole Schwalbe (1929–1990)
- Carl Christian Seydewitz (1777–1857)
- Herman Siegumfeldt (1833–1912)
- Alfred Simonsen (1906–1935)
- Niels Simonsen (1807–1885)
- Joakim Skovgaard (1856–1933)
- Niels Skovgaard (1858–1938)
- P.C. Skovgaard (1817–1875)
- Agnes Slott-Møller (1862–1937)
- Harald Slott-Møller (1864–1937)
- Frederik Sødring (1809–1862)
- Jens Søndergaard (1895–1957)
- Jørgen Sonne (1801–1890)
- Carl Frederik Sørensen (1818–1879)
- Ole Sporring (born 1941)
- Niels Larsen Stevns (1864–1941)
- Christine Swane (1876–1960)
- Sigurd Swane (1879–1973)
- Anna Syberg (1870–1914)
- Ernst Syberg (1906–1981)
- Fritz Syberg (1862–1939)

== T ==
- Carl Thomsen (1847–1912)
- Reinhold Timm (?–1639)
- Peter Tom-Petersen (1861–1926)
- Holger Topp-Pedersen (1868–1938)
- Kurt Trampedach (1943–2013)
- Eleonora Tscherning (1817–1890)
- Laurits Tuxen (1853–1927)
- Nicoline Tuxen (1853–1927)

== V ==
- Herman Vedel (1875–1948)

== W ==
- Olga Wagner (1873–1963)
- Bertha Wegmann (1847–1926)
- Edvard Weie (1879–1943)
- Friedrich Bernhard Westphal (1803–1844)
- Johannes Wilhjelm (1868–1938)
- Jens Ferdinand Willumsen (1863–1958)
- Svend Wiig Hansen (1922–1997)
- Bjørn Wiinblad (1918–2006)
- Abraham Wuchters (1608–1682)

== Z ==
- Christian Zacho (1843–1913)
- Kristian Zahrtmann (1843–1917)
- Johann Georg Ziesenis (1716–1777)

== See also ==
- Danish art
- List of Danes
- List of lists of painters by nationality
