= Morten Andersen (disambiguation) =

Morten Andersen (born 1960) is a Danish-born former American football kicker.

Morten Andersen may also refer to:

== Sports ==
- Morten Beck Andersen (born 1988), Danish football forward
- Morten Bertolt Andersen (born 1984), Danish football midfielder
- Morten Hedegaard Andersen (born 1972), Danish cricketer
- Morten Andersen (speedway rider) (born 1970), Danish speedway rider

== Others ==
- Morten Andersen (painter) (born 1976), Danish painter
- Morten Andersen (photographer), Danish fashion photographer
