= Tupsy Clement =

Norwegian artist (1871–1959)

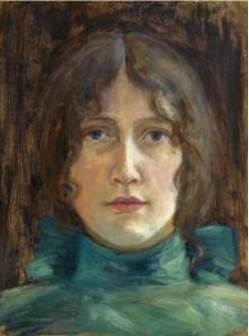
Tupsy Clement (1890), portrait by Hans Heyerdahl.

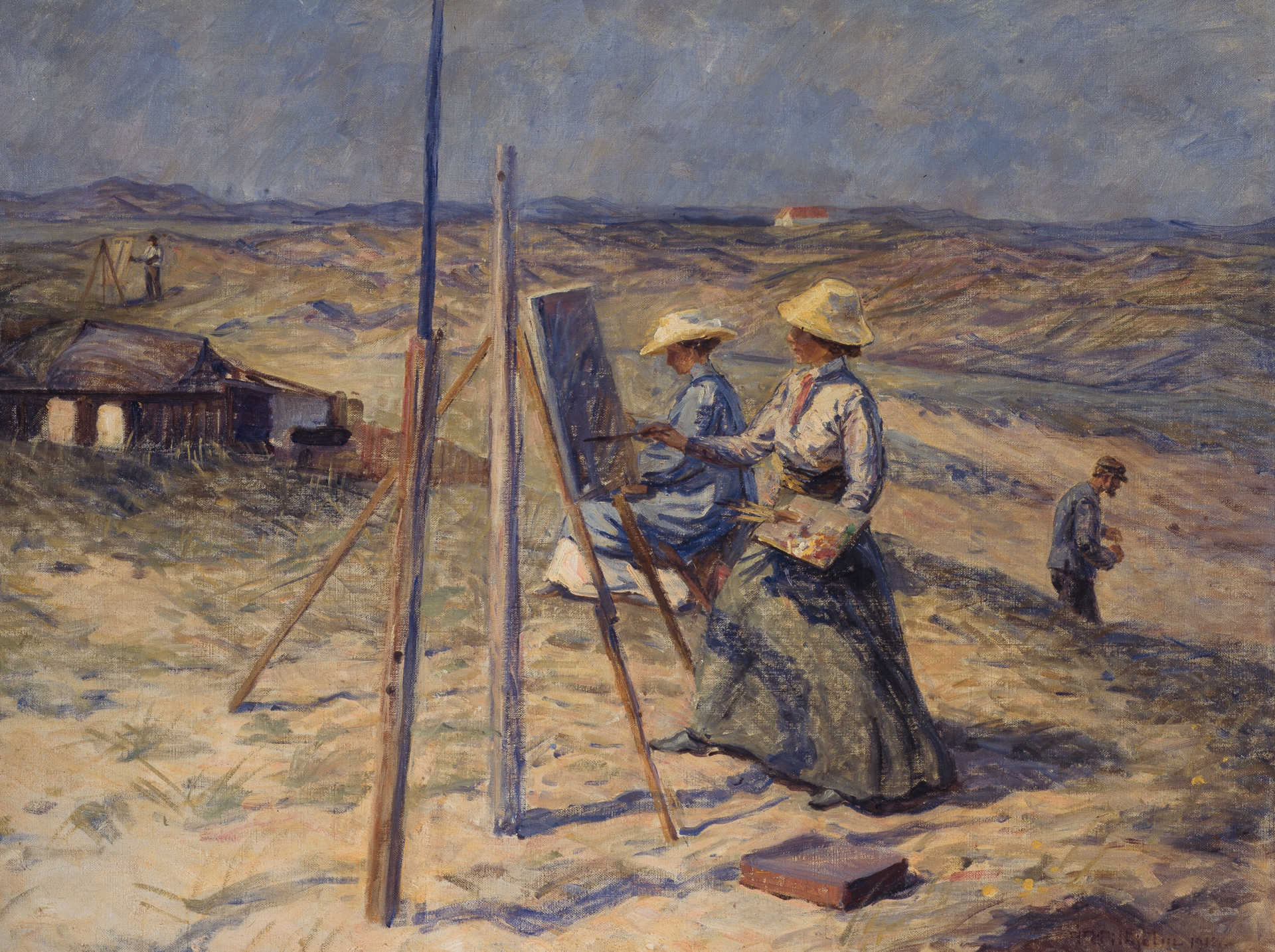
Johannes Wilhjelm, Young female artists in Skagen, 1912, Skagens Museum. Artists Tupsy Clement og Ella Heide in the foreground. In the back on the left is Tupsy's husband and colleague G.F. Clement.

Martha Caroline "Tupsy" Clement, née Jebe, (Trondheim, 13 April 1871 – Copenhagen, 5 September 1959) was a Norwegian painter, the wife of Danish painter G.F. Clement. Her most notable landscapes were painted in Skagen where she spent her summers with her husband from 1908 to 1920.

== Early life and education ==
Born in Trondheim, Clement was the daughter of Major Hakon Jebe and Hedvig Klingenberg. She studied under Hans Heyerdahl in Oslo (1896) and under Christoph Roth in Munich (1898–99) before she continued her studies in Paris. She completed her education in Italy in 1905.

== Biography ==
Tupsy Clement had a broad artistic background before she met the Danish painter G.F. Clement. The couple married in Rome in 1902 and thereafter settled in Denmark. In addition to portraits, Tupsy painted flowers, exteriors and landscapes.

Among her best paintings were those she completed in Skagen where she spent her summers with her husband every year from 1908 to 1920, often in the company of Laurits Tuxen and Viggo Johansen. Her painting Two girls playing at Skagen Beach was once owned by King Christian X who spent his summers at Klitgaarden in Skagen. Many of her works show her husband's influence but her depiction of sunlight in her landscapes also appears to be inspired by Theodor Philipsen. From 1920, the couple spent most of their summers in Italy. G.F. Clement died in 1933 and Tupsy in 1959.
