= Einar Hein =

Danish painter

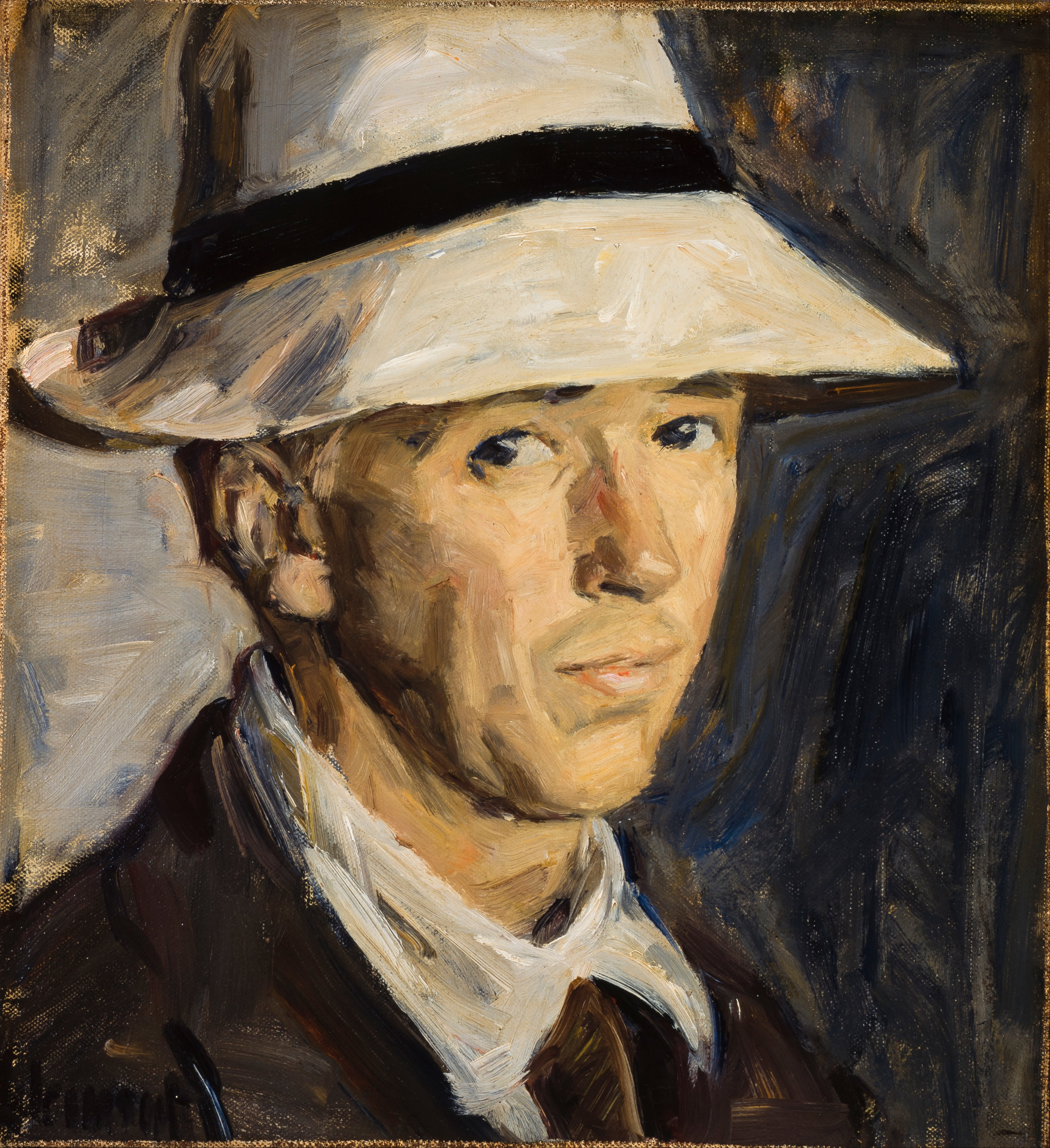
- Einar Hein painted by Gad Frederik Clement, 1911.
- Born: May 19, 1875; Copenhagen, Denmark
- Died: August 8, 1931 (aged 56); Frederiksberg, Denmark
- Education: Royal Danish Academy of Fine Arts
- Movement: Skagen Painters

Einar Hein (19 May 1875 – 8 August 1931) was a Danish painter who is remembered for his paintings of the landscapes and people of Skagen in the north of Denmark.

== Biography ==
Born in Copenhagen, Hein studied at the Copenhagen Technical School under Holger Grønvold (1850-1923) before attending the Royal Academy from 1892 to 1896. He completed his studies at the Kunsternes Studieskole under P. S. Krøyer. He was undoubtedly influenced by Krøyer in choosing to extend his education at the studio of Alfred Philippe Roll in Paris.

Like Jens Vige, Johannes Wilhjelm and G. F. Clement, Hein belonged to the younger generation of Skagen Painters (Skagensmalerne) who at the beginning of the 20th century developed a new approach to painting the dunes and beaches of Skagen in the far north of Jutland.

One of his most notable works is Legende børn på Skagens strand (Children Playing on Skagen's Beach) from 1910, painted against the light with unusually subdued colours. He also completed several scenes of Skagen's vividly coloured heathland. Hein quickly became part of the Skagen painters' colony, taking his place in the dining room at Brøndums Hotel, becoming a regular summer visitor together with his family. He also produced finely crafted portraits and pictures of children but they failed to attract wide interest.

== Gallery ==
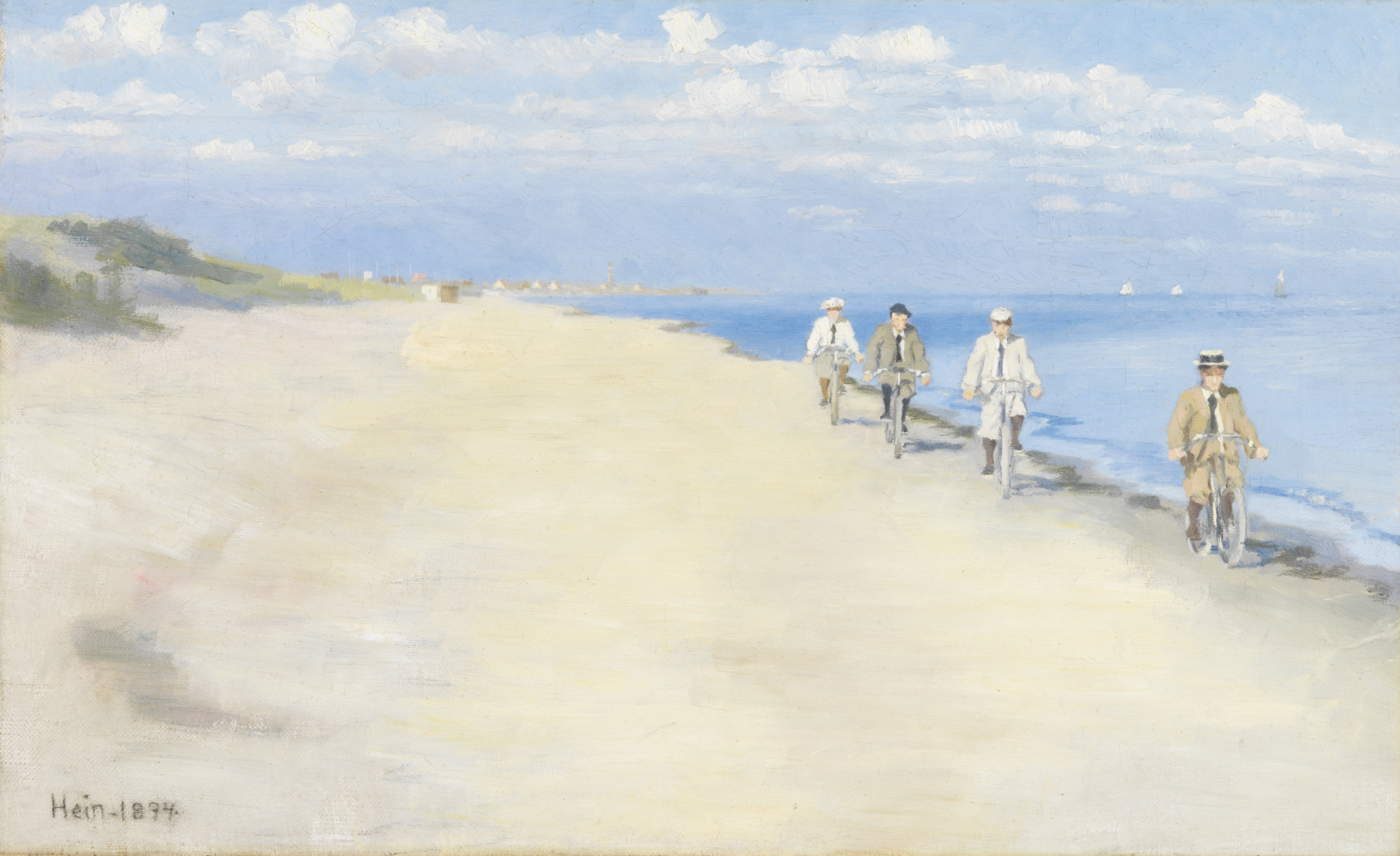
Beach cyclists (1894)

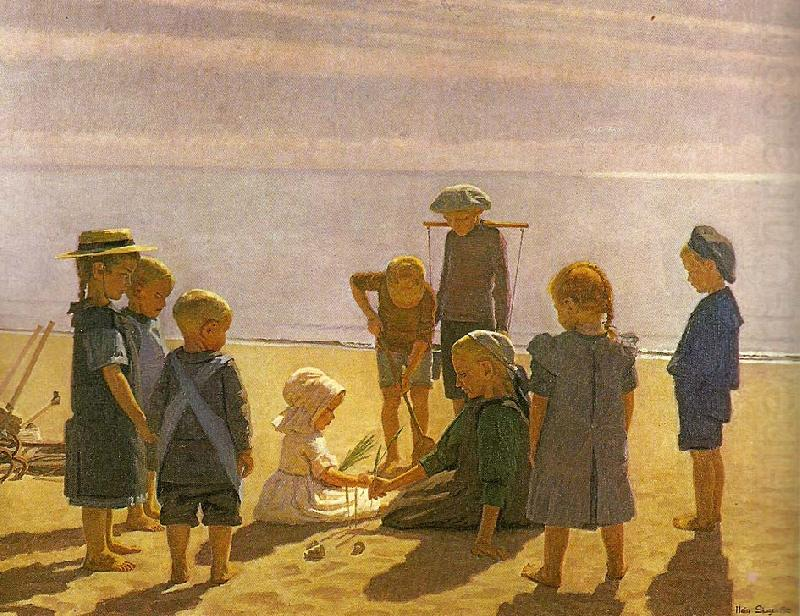
Children Playing on Skagen's Beach (1910)
