= Rudyard =

Rudyard may refer to:

== Places ==
- Rudyard, Mississippi, United States, an unincorporated community
- Rudyard, Montana, United States, a census-designated place
- Rudyard Township, Michigan, United States
  - Rudyard, Michigan, an unincorporated community
- Rudyard, Staffordshire, England, a village
  - Rudyard Lake, in Rudyard, Staffordshire, a reservoir

== Given names ==
- Harald Rudyard Engman (1903–1968), Danish artist, painter
- Rudyard Griffiths (born 1970), TV anchor
- Rudyard Kipling (1865–1936), English author and poet
- Rudyard Spencer (born 1944), Jamaican politician and Minister of Health

== Surnames ==
- Benjamin Rudyard (1572–1658), an English poet and politician
- Carol Rudyard (1922–2021), English-Australian visual artist
- John Rudyard (1650-c.1718), second builder of the Eddystone Lighthouse (1708)
- Thomas Rudyard (1640–1692), first deputy governor of East New Jersey

== See also ==
- Ridyard, a surname derived from Rudyard, Staffordshire
