= Ella Heide =

Danish painter

Ella Christine Heide, née Brodersen, (24. November 1871 – 1956) was a Danish painter who from 1908 painted in Skagen in the far north of Jutland.

== Biography ==
Born in Flensburg in 1871, she married Rolf Wilhelm Heide who owned the Kragelund Teglværk brick factory near Aarhus (divorced in 1909). She had two children, Margarite Ella (1893) and Ove (1896). In 1908, she arrived in Skagen where she painted many watercolours and oils of the traditional subjects and scenes. She returned every summer, staying first with the Holst sisters on Søndervej.

Ella Heide's brother, Johan Friedrich Brodersen (or just 'Hans' among family and friends), had moved to Skagen with his family in 1896. As a key member of the local authority, in 1903 he built the White House (det Hvide Hus) which became a favourite gathering spot for members of the Skagen Painters including Holger Drachmann and P.S. Krøyer.

Heide started to paint in Skagen at the very end of the period enjoyed by the well-known Skagen Painters. Holger Drachmann died in 1908 and P.S. Krøyer in 1909. She therefore belonged to the younger generation of painters in Skagen which included Jørgen Aabye, Johannes Wilhjelm, Frederik Lange, and Tupsy and Gad Frederik Clement, none of whom achieved the same notability as the former group. Among her paintings of Skagen are Saxilds gård set fra havesiden. Anchers hus i baggrunden, Hvide hus, and P.S. Krøyers Hus i Skagen (1938), Parti fra Skagen (1939), Den tilsandede kirke, Parti fra Gammel Skagen, Det Blå Hus. Many other examples of her work can be seen at art dealers' sites. On the occasion of her 70th birthday in 1941, the local newspaper Vendsyssel Tidende reported on the wide recognition she had received from the local community, most of whom had her pictures hanging in their homes.
