= Ridyard =

Ridyard is a locational surname of British origin, which means a person from the village of Rudyard, Staffordshire. Related names include Rudyard, Rudgard, and Rudyer. The name may refer to:

- Alf Ridyard (1908–1981), British football player
- Eveline Ridyard (1898–1973), British politician
- Martyn Ridyard (born 1986), British rugby league player

== Other uses ==
- Albert Ridyard Three-Decker, historic house in Massachusetts
- B. E. Ridyard Three-Decker, historic house in Massachusetts
