= Jean-Baptiste Massé =

French miniature painter (1687–1767)

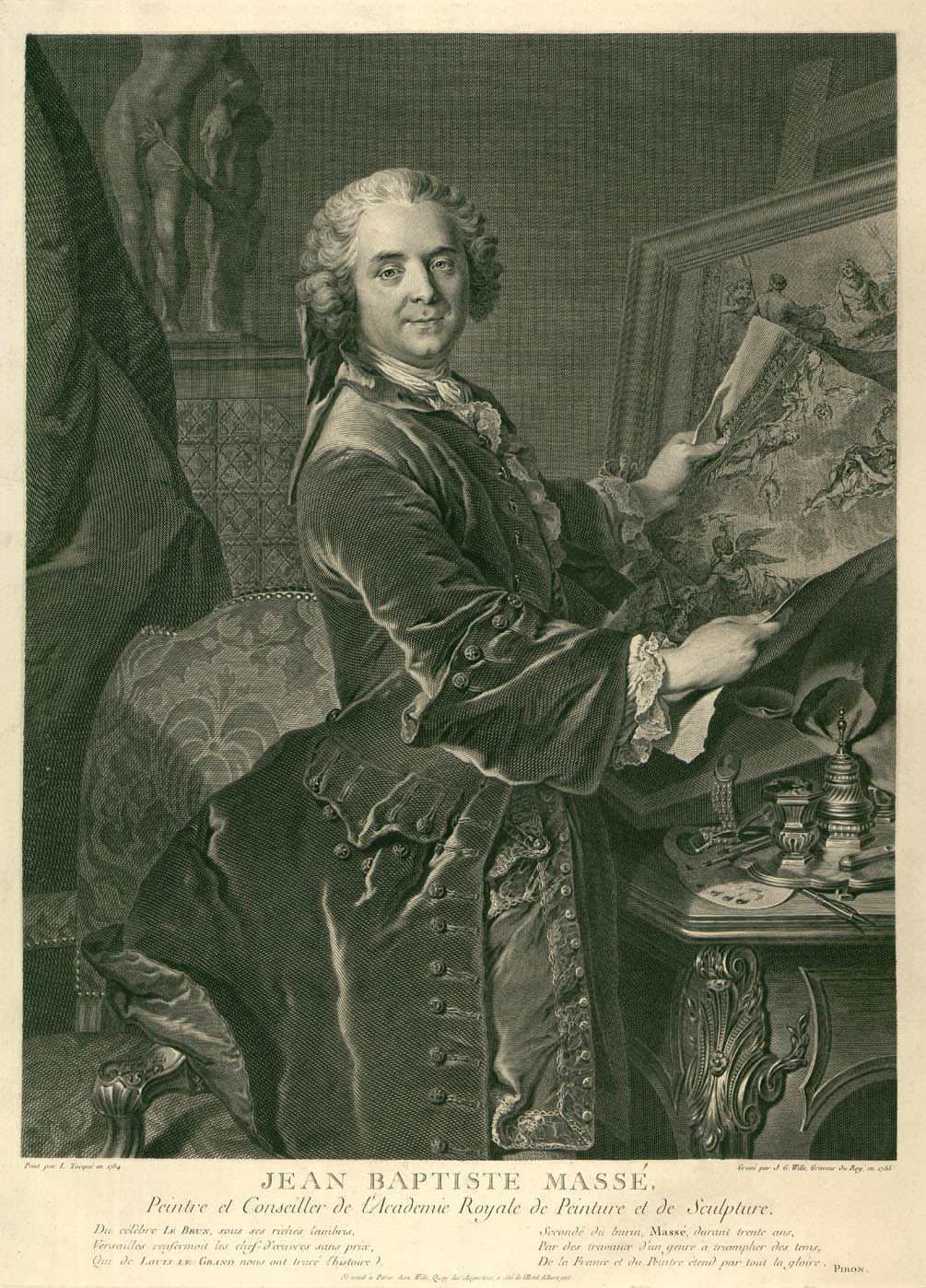
Portrait by Louis Tocqué, 1754 (engraved by Johann Georg Wille)

Jean-Baptiste Massé (29 December 1687, in Paris – 26 September 1767, in Paris) was a French miniature painter, engraver, and draftsman, best remembered as the court painter of Louis XV, for training Jean-Étienne Liotard and Cornelius Høyer, and for his volumes on the works of Charles Le Brun titled Galerie de Versailles (produced 1732–1753).

Masse left a very detailed last will and testament, that ran to 36 folio pages, and another 24 pages of codicils, that captured in detail his assets, possessions and his deliberations on how they should be distributed after his death.
