= Cornelius Høyer =

Danish painter

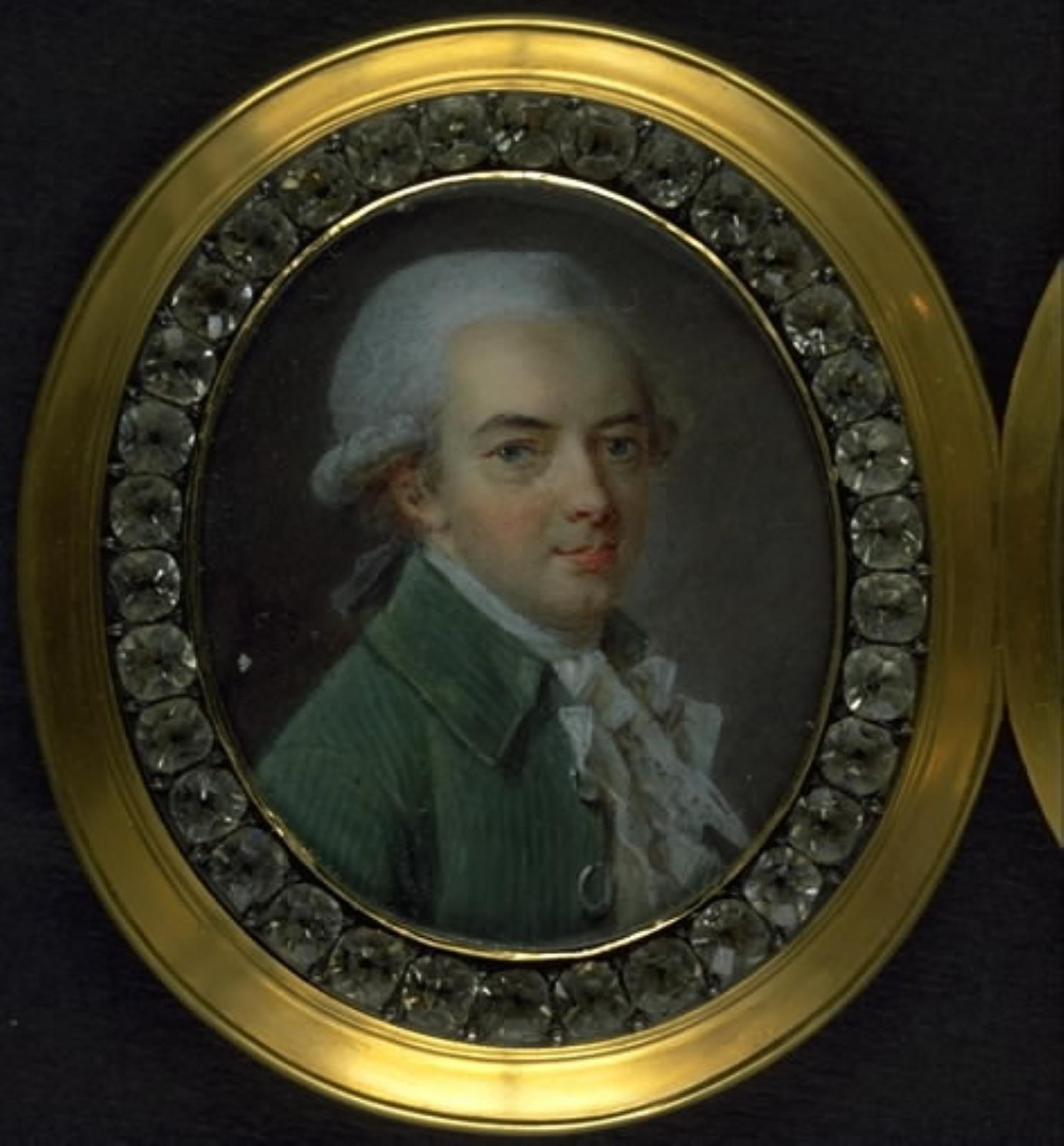
- Self-Portrait by Høyer
- Born: 26 February 1741; Hellebæk, Denmark
- Died: 2 June 1804 (aged 62–63); Copenhagen, Denmark
- Education: Royal Danish Academy of Fine Arts
- Known for: Nubuatyre painter

Cornelius Høyer (26 February 1741 – 2 June 1804) was a Danish painter, mainly known for his work in miniatures. Within his special trade, he was among the virtuosos of his day and won an international reputation.

== Early life and education ==
Høyer was born at the Kronborg Rifle Factory. From an early age he attended the Royal Danish Academy of Fine Arts, studying under Carl Gustaf Pilo and Louis Tocqué, and later continued his education in Paris where Jean-Baptiste Massé taught him miniature painting.

A visit to Italy in 1767 introduced him to Rosalba Carriera and he learned new skills, including the special technique of painting on ivory.

== Career ==
In 1769, Høyer was appointed Miniature Painter to the Danish Court and the following year he became a member of the Academy. Visits to several European courts, including those in Stockholm, Saint Petersburg and Berlin, contributed to his increasing international reputation.

== Personal life ==
Høyer was married to Frederikke Christiane Fortling (1755–1829), daughter of the court stone mason Jacob Fortling (1711–61) and Anne Christine Hellesen (c. 1724–72). They were wed on On 15 October 1773 in St. Peter's Church in Copenhagen.

== Gallery ==
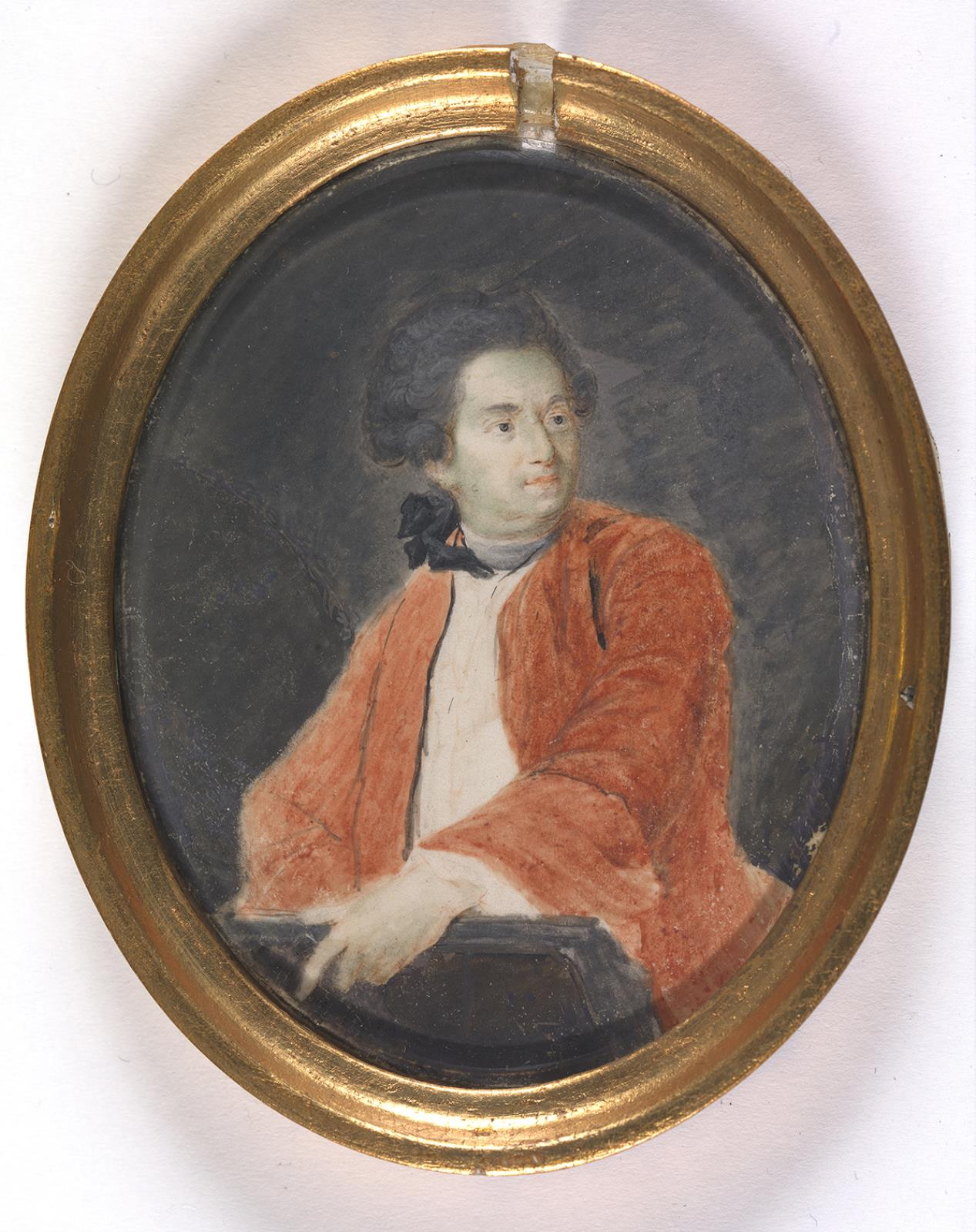
Carl Gustav Pilo by Høyer

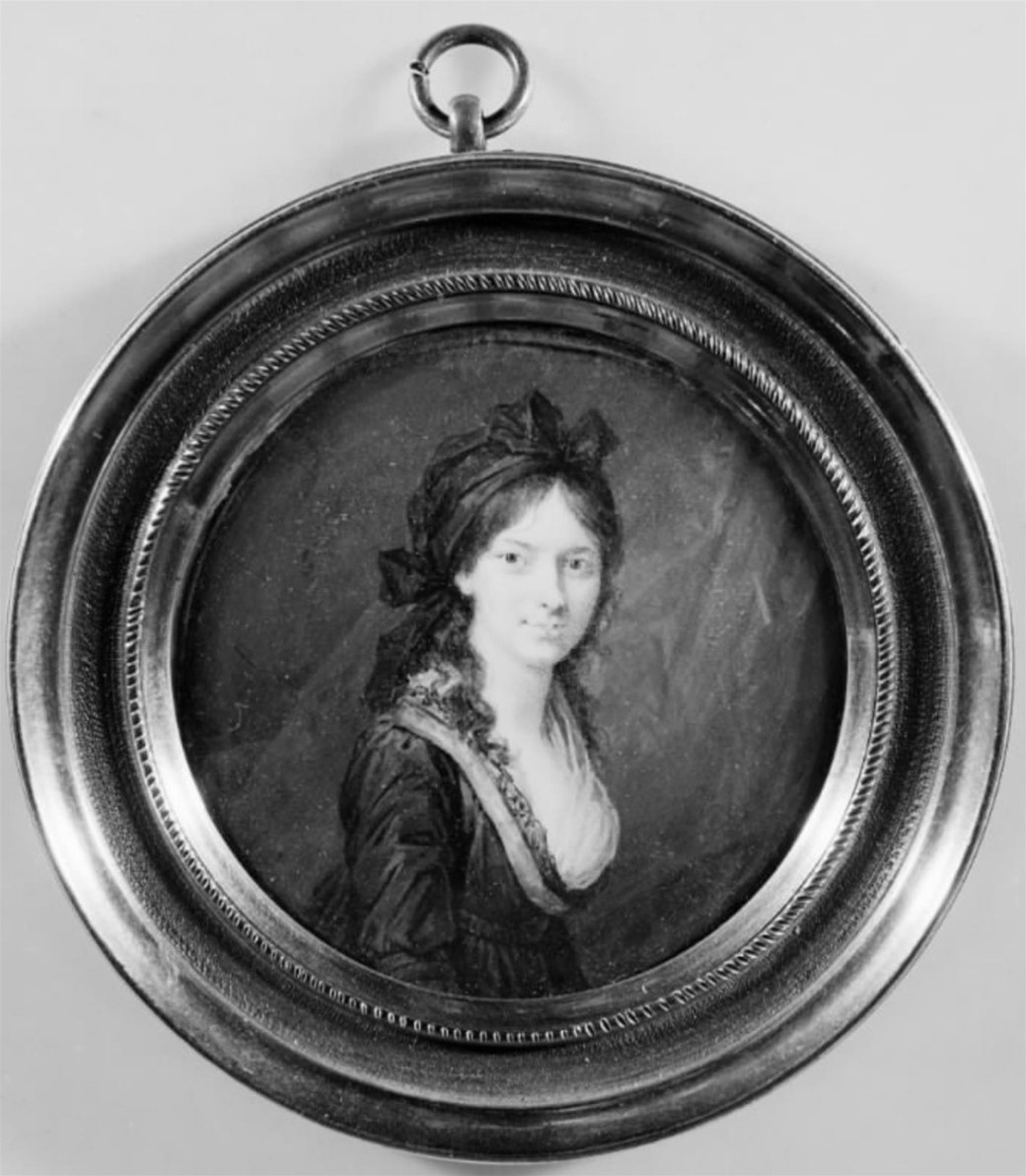
Anna Elisabeth Ter Borch by Høyer

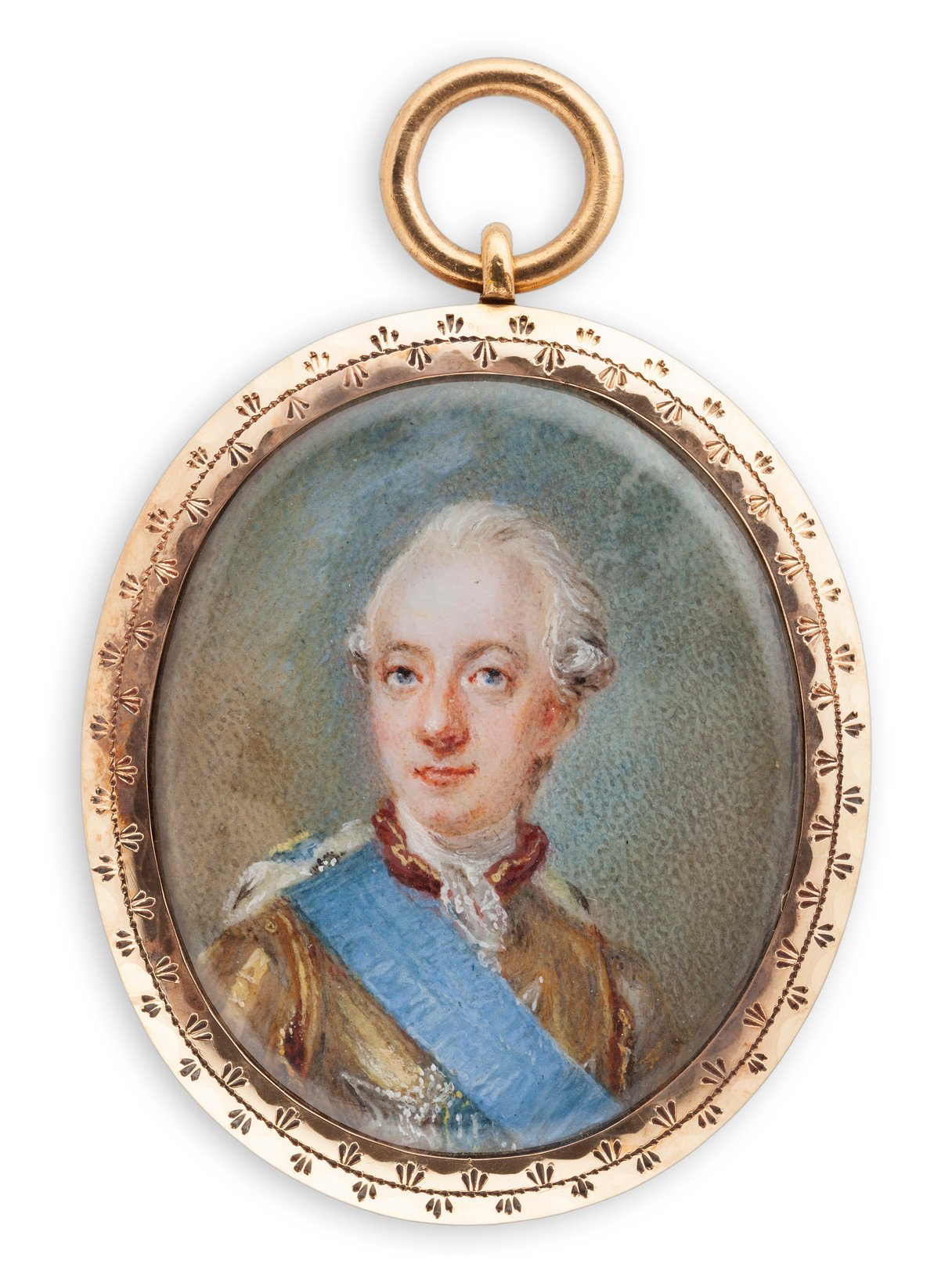
Duke Karl (XIII) by Høyer

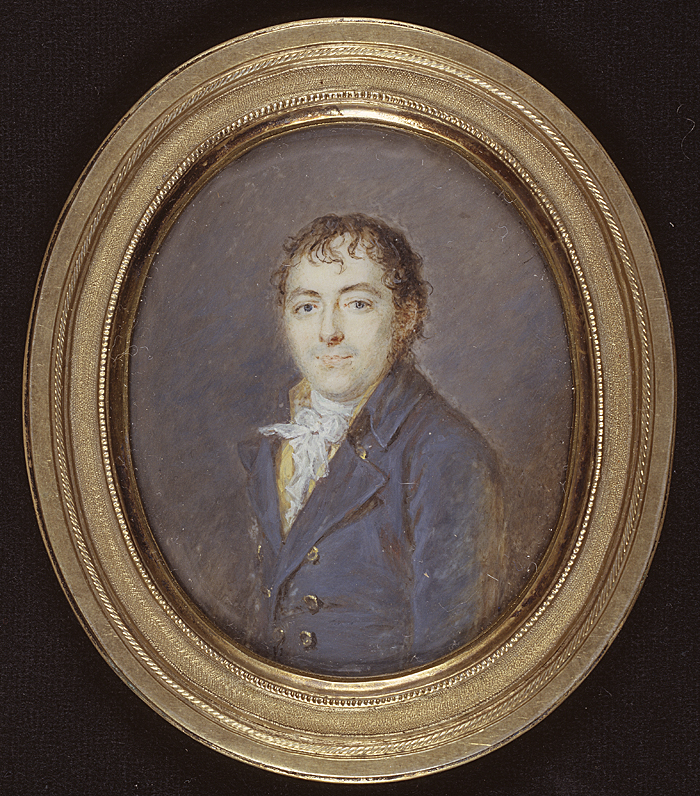
Peter van Hemert by Høyer

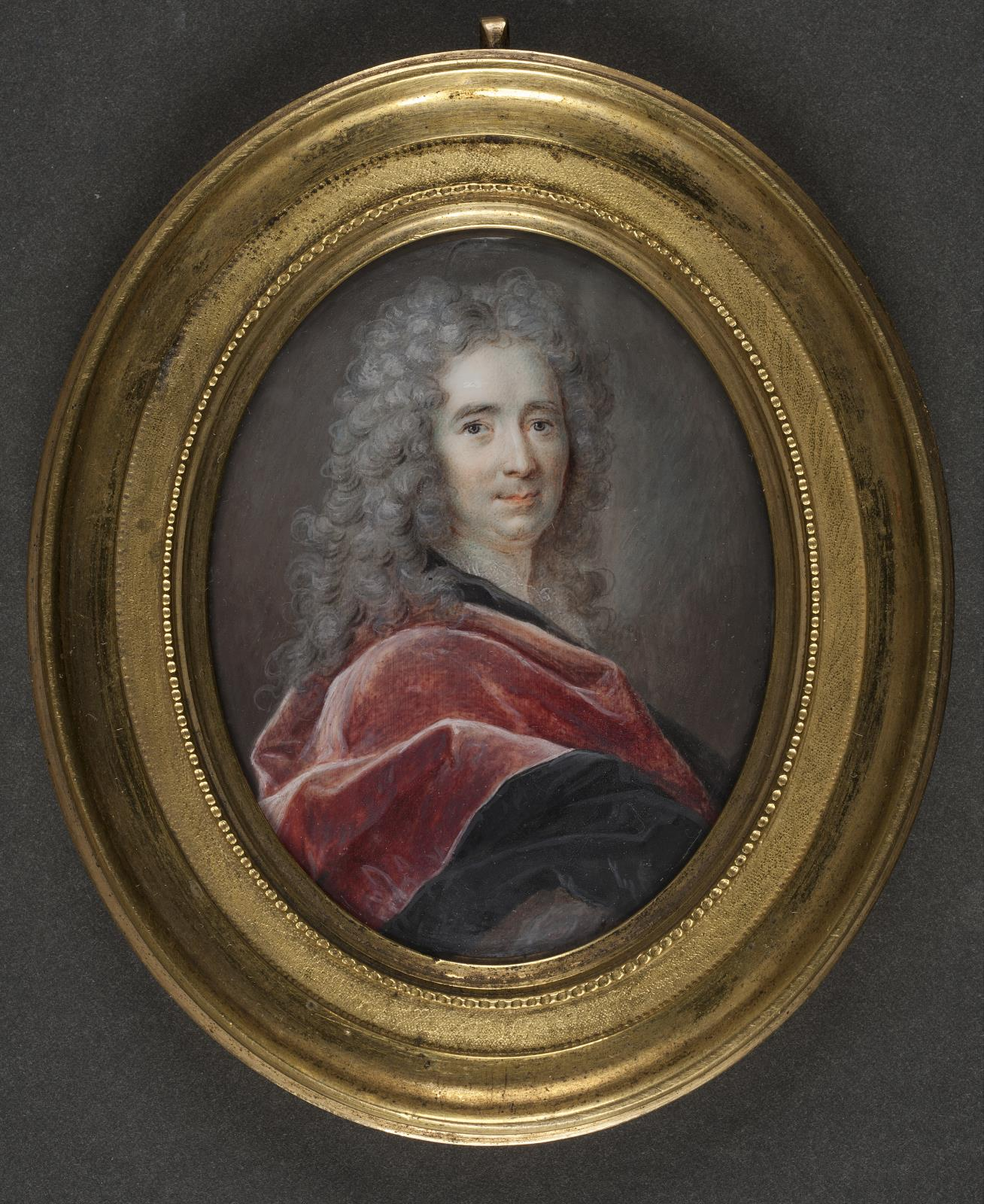
Jean-Baptiste Masse by Høyer

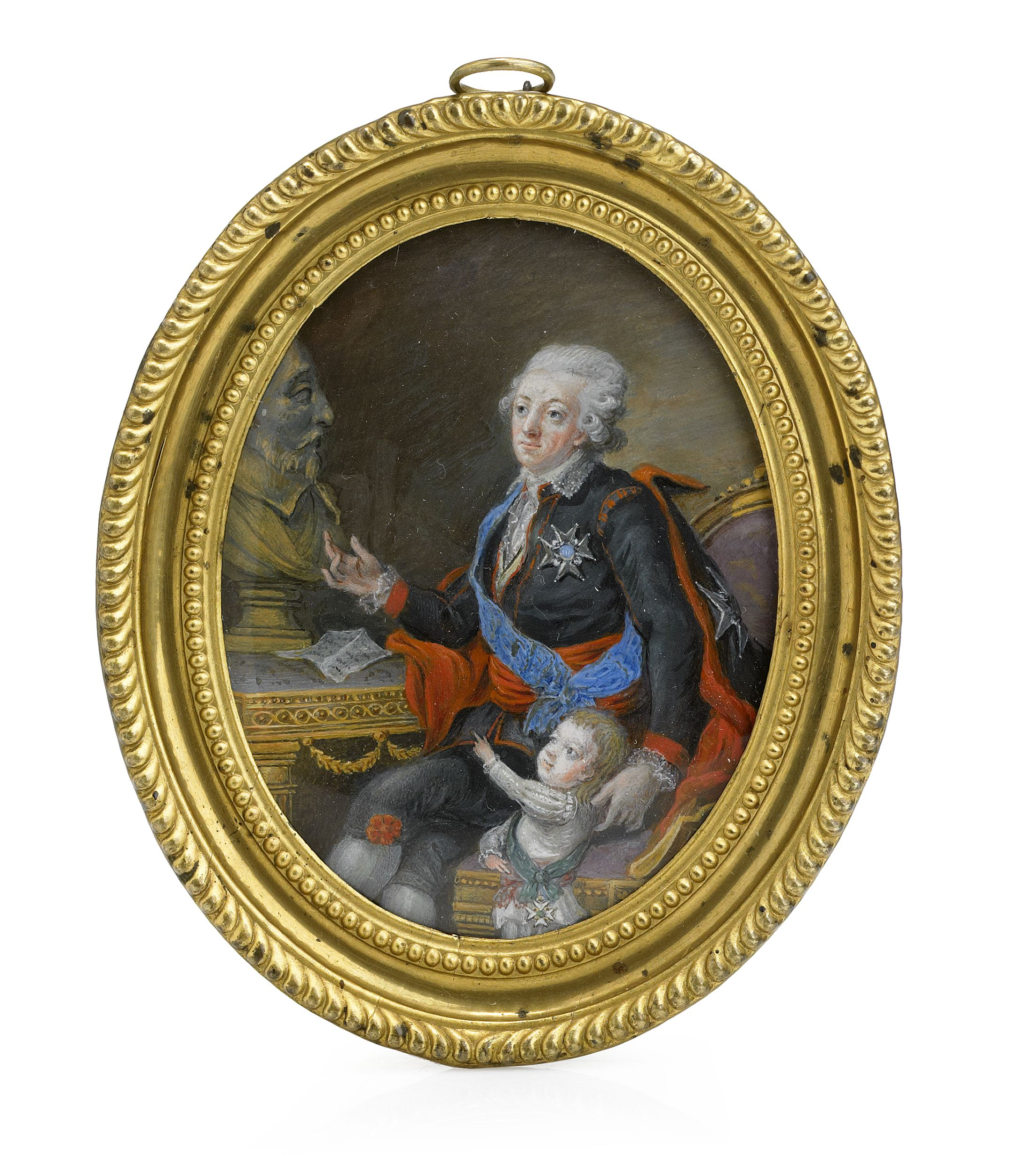
Gustav Adolf by Høyer

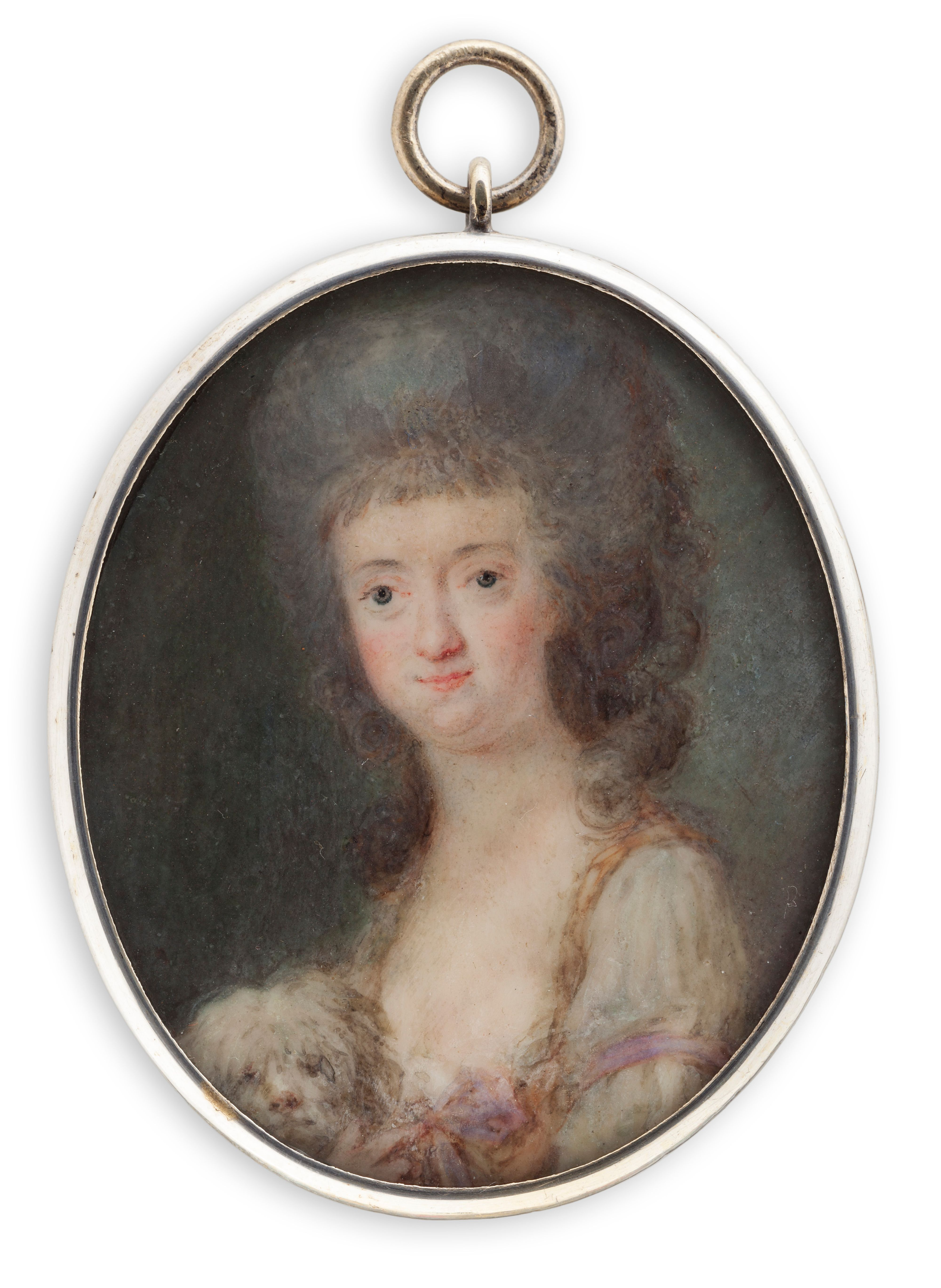
Princess Sofia Albertina

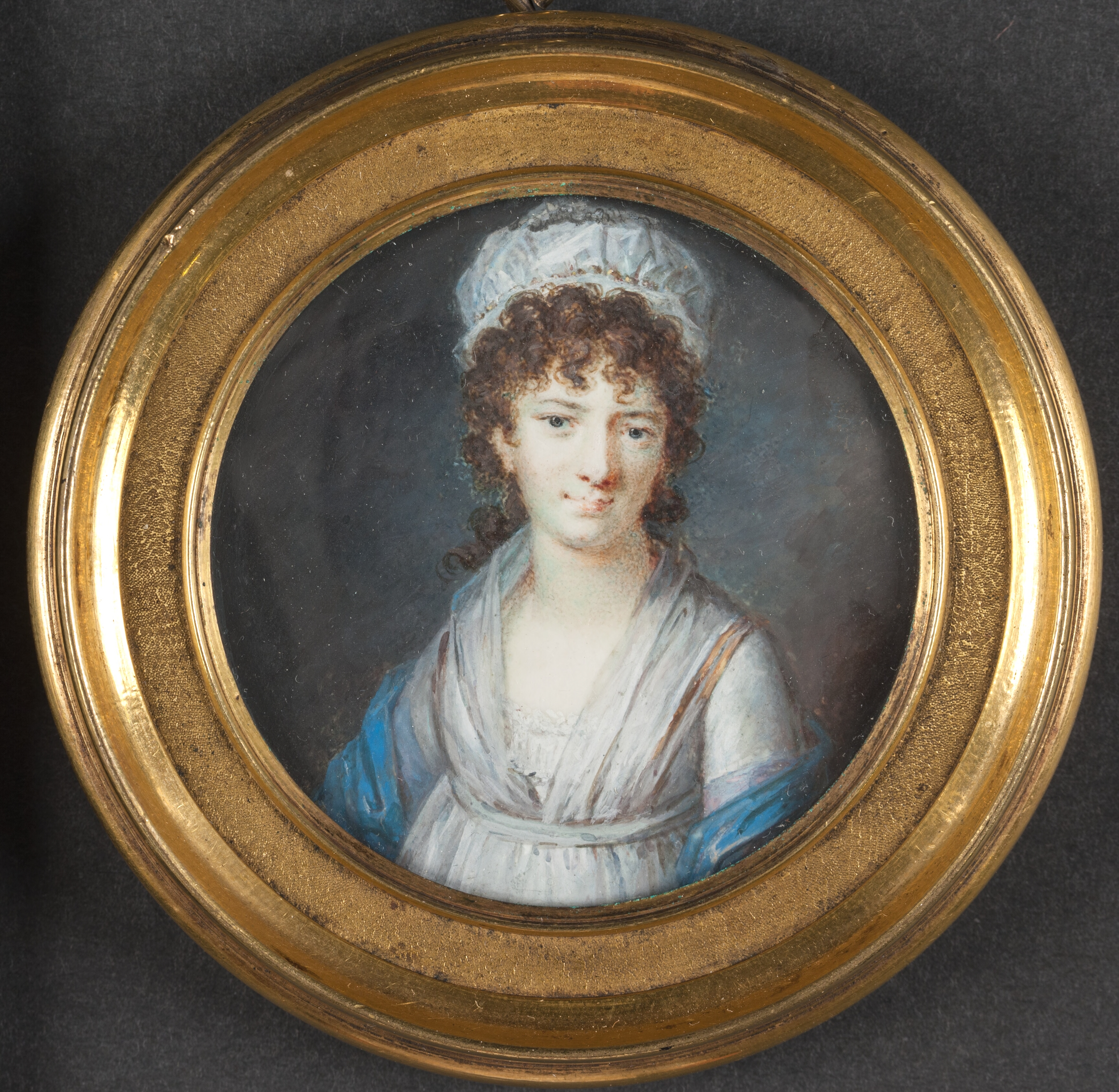
Magdalene Charlotte Schimmelmann (née Schubart by Høyer

== See also ==
- List of Danish painters
