= Fritz Petzholdt =

Danish landscape painter

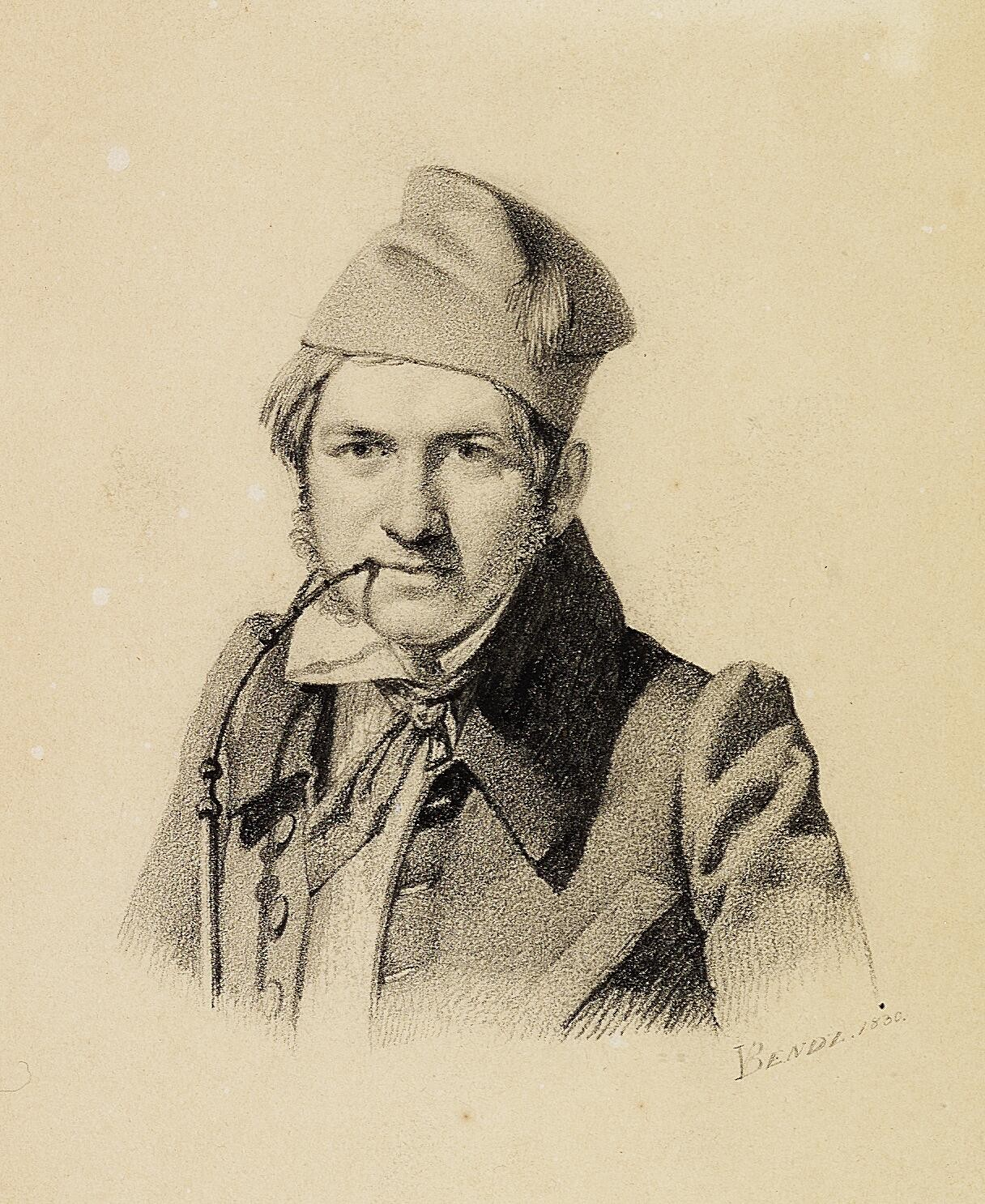
Fritz Petzholdt (1830); portrait by Wilhelm Bendz.

Ernst Christian Petzholdt, known as Fritz (1 January 1805 – 29 August 1838) was a Danish landscape painter of the Copenhagen School, also known as the Golden Age of Danish Painting. He spent most of his artistic life in Italy, where he painted refined landscapes in a light colour palette but died early, possibly by way of suicide.

== Biography ==
Fritz Petzholdt was born into a prosperous home on 1 January 1805 in Copenhagen to grocer Johan Jacob Petzholdt and his second wife Josephine Marie Elisabeth Petzholdt. After completing an apprenticeship as a house painter, he attended the Royal Danish Academy of Fine Arts from 1824 where he studied under Christoffer Wilhelm Eckersberg, known as the father of the Golden Age of Danish Painting spanning the first half of the 19th century. He graduated in 1828 and already the following year sold a painting, En mose ved Høsterkøb med tørvearbejdere (A Bog at Høsterkøb), to the Royal Danish Painting Collection.

Although he never won the Academy's gold medal, the traditional opening for Academy students to go abroad to further their studies since it was accompanied by a travel stipend, his family's wealth allowed him to travel to Harz the same year and then, in May 1830, to set out for Rome. On the way he visited Dresden, Prague, Nuremberg, Munich, Venice and Florence. In Rome he joined the Danish artists colony which had formed in the city with Bertel Thorvaldsen as its centre. He made excursions to the Roman countryside—to places such as Tivoli, Subiaco and Olevano—as well as longer trips south to Naples, Sicily and Corfu.

In the winter of 1835/36 he returned to Copenhagen due to his father's illness and subsequent death. Shortly after the funeral, he returned to Italy with an extended stop in Munich on the way. From Italy he continued to Greece, a destination only Martinus Rørbye had visited before him among the Danish Golden Age painters. On 29 August 1838 he was found dead in his hotel room in Patras with his throat cut. Whether it was a case of suicide or murder was never settled.

== Gallery ==
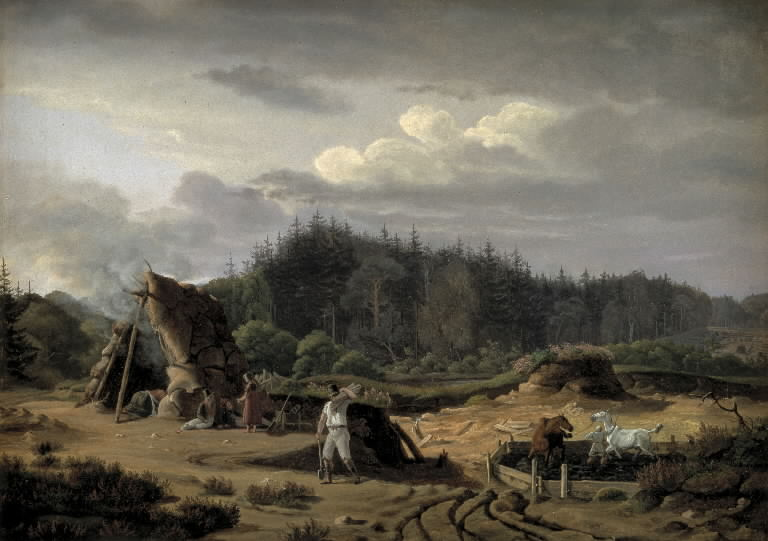
A bog with peat cutters near Høsterkøb

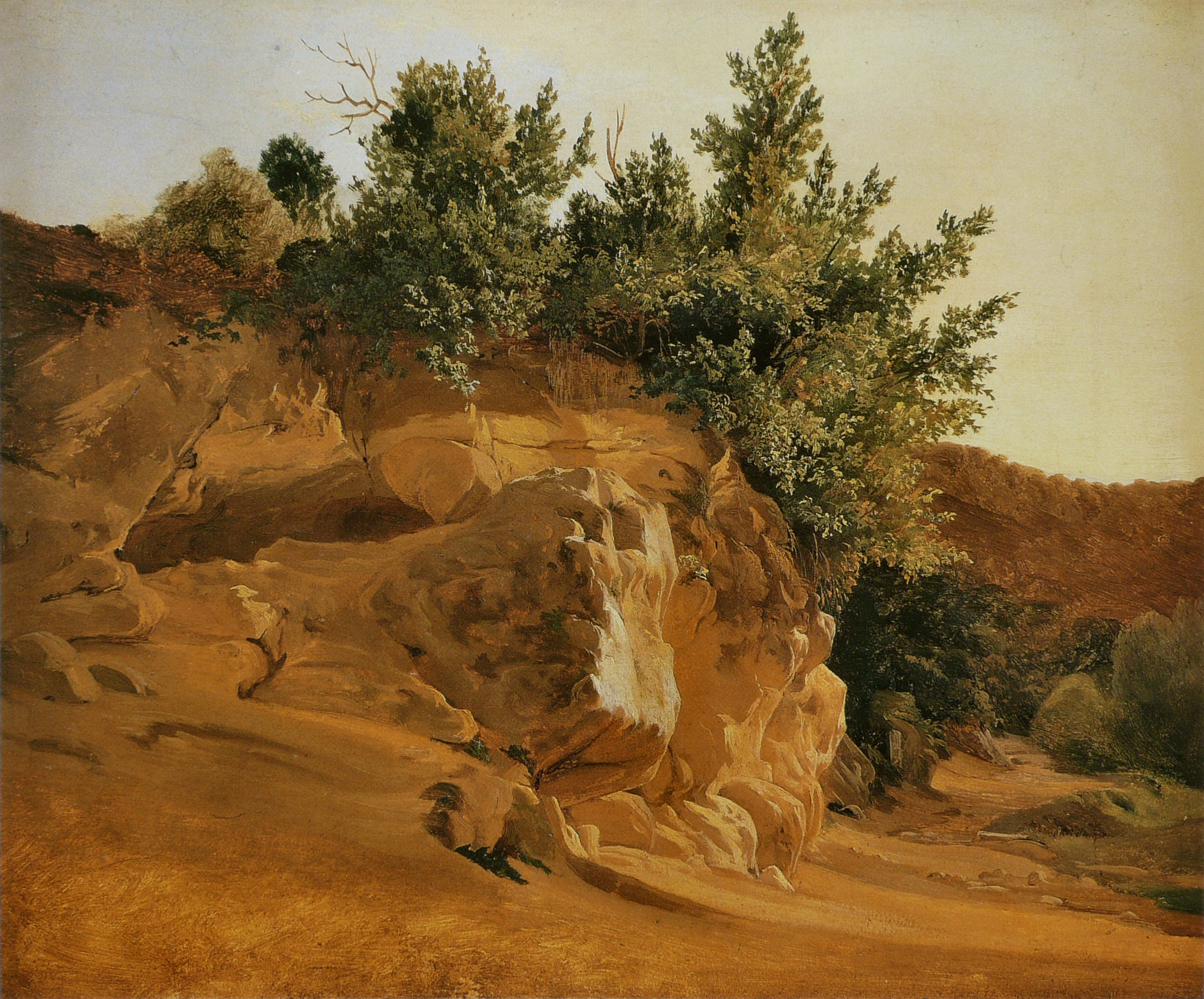
Italian Mountain Landscape with Overgrown Rock, probably near Olevano

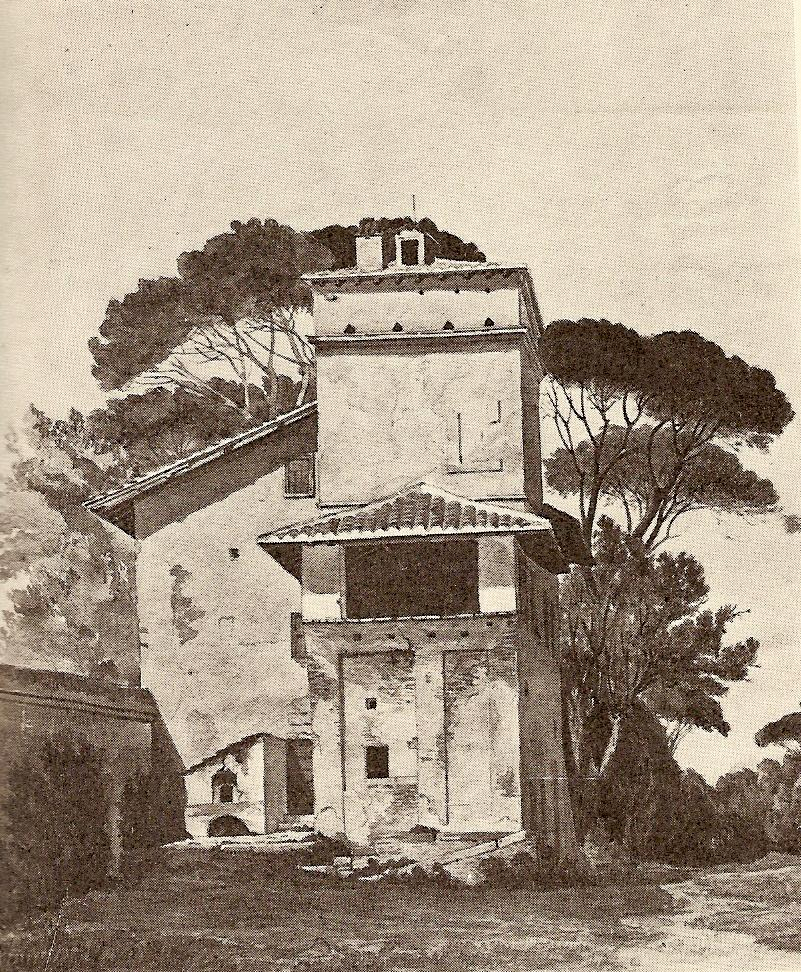
Watercolour of Raffael's studio in Villa Borghese's garden, Rome

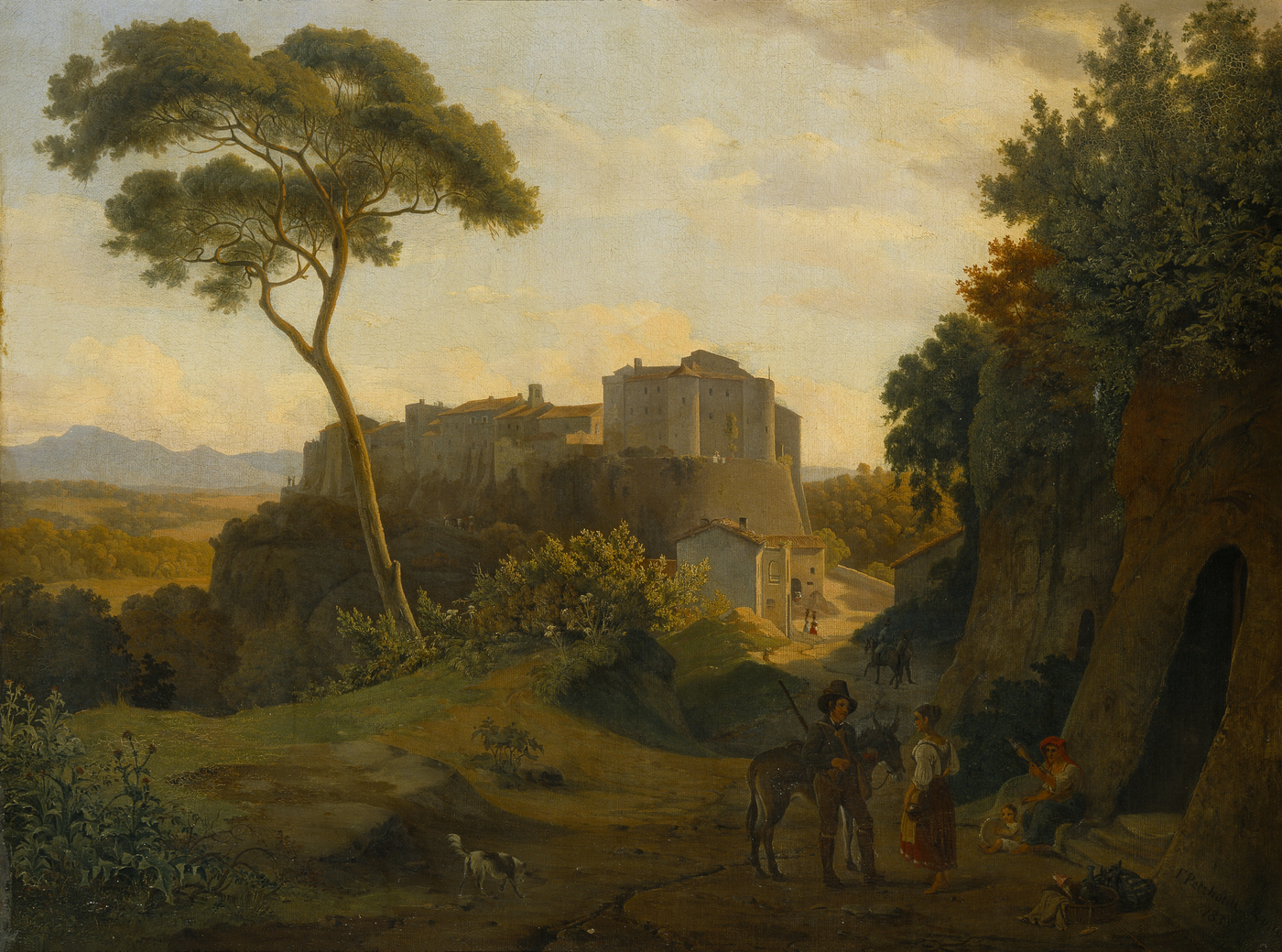
Landscape by the old vejl, 1835, Thorvaldsen Museum

== See also ==
- Art of Denmark
- List of Danish painters
