= Johannes Holt Iversen =

Danish painter and sculptor (born 1989)

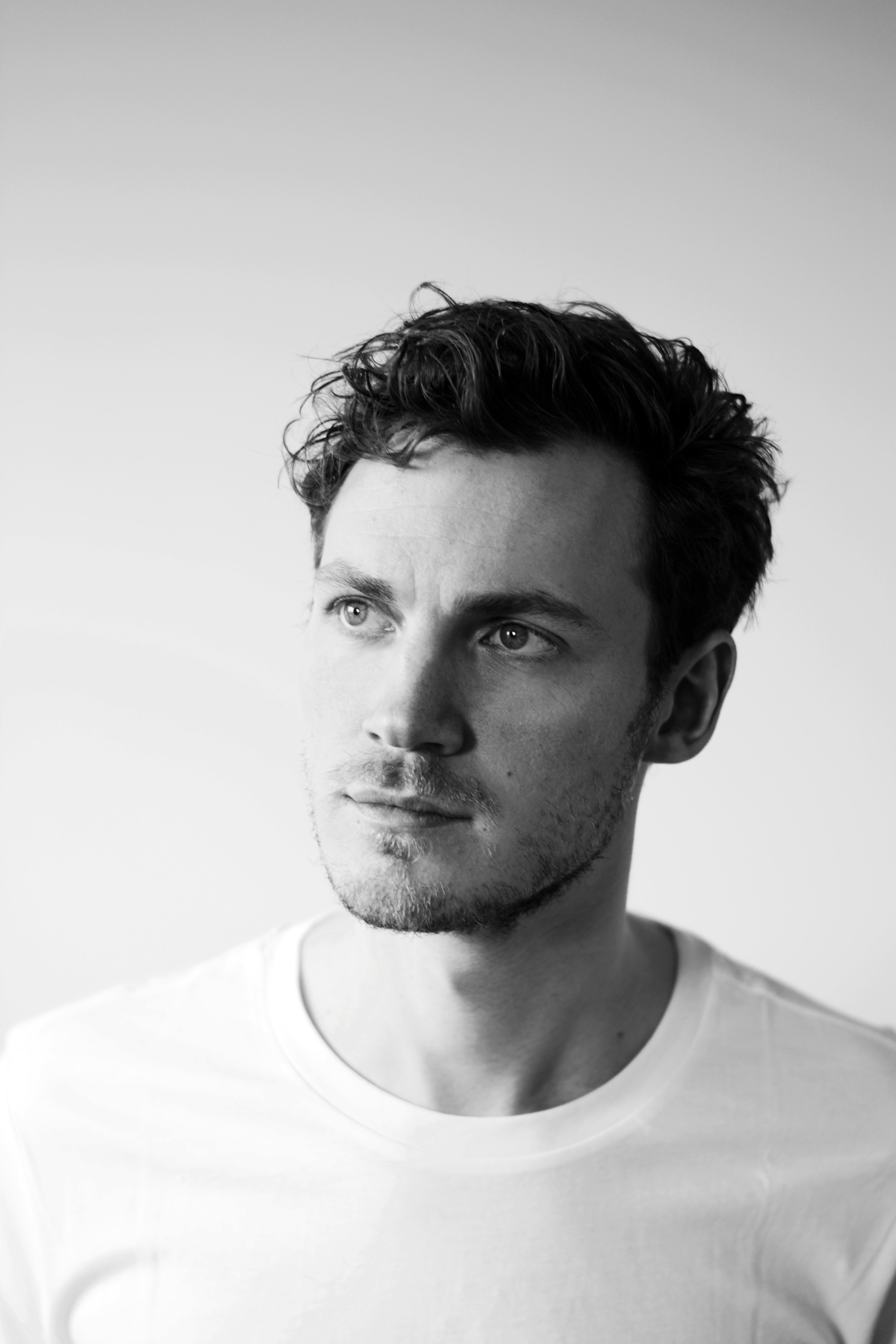
- Born: Johannes Holt Iversen; 8 September 1989; Amager, Copenhagen, Denmark
- Education: Gerrit Rietveld Academie University of Aalborg, MFA Erik Rytter
- Known for: Painting, Sculpture, Installation Art
- Movement: Contemporary Art

Johannes Holt Iversen (born 8 September 1989) is a Danish painter and sculptor living and working in Amsterdam, Netherlands since 2016. He is an apprentice of Danish painter and sculptor Erik Rytter (former assistant of Poul Gernes).

== Early career ==
=== Early work, 1999–2014 ===
Johannes Holt Iversen started out his artistic career in the music industry, writing songs and performing on stage at age 9. In his teenage years he began as a singer/songwriter writing songs for sync. opportunities abroad in Asia and the United States under American representation. In 2012 he collaborated with American R&B/Soul artist and singer Omar Wilson featuring on the track "Dreamology" released in the US. In 2014 his single "Love Train" was in the bidding, co-writing for Korean K-pop sensation Super Junior. "Love Train" was produced by J-pop producer Ryuichiro Yamaki (Namie Amuro, Airi Suzuki) and renowned producer Pete Maher (U2, Katy Perry, Depeche Mode). In 2014 he participated in the development and initiation of the Spotify Artists open data programme, using an artist pseudonyme on the streaming service.

=== Academy Years, 2016–2020 ===
Johannes Holt Iversen was enrolled to the Dutch Academy of Fine Arts Gerrit Rietveld Academie in September 2016. He financed almost entirely his art education and tuition fees by selling his early sketches and paintings online, this was kept a secret from his professors as he feared it would alter their view upon him and worsen his study environment. He worked as an artist secretly after the art academy study hours. Later in 2016 he participated in the Остен International Biennial of Drawing at the Остен Museum of Modern Art Skopje, Macedonia. In 2018 Johannes Holt Iversen exhibited at Glassbox Gallery in the 11th arrondissement of Paris, France as well as CHPEA Museum in Herning Denmark where he participated on the national Danish TV program series The Great Masterpiece Challenge on DR1, based on the concept by the British TV-network Sky Arts. Here he painted an exact replica of the famous CoBrA painting "Bird Eating" from 1939 by Carl-Henning Pedersen. In 2019 Johannes Holt Iversens works from his series Lascaux 1.0 beta was acquired for the Danish National Art Collection by the Danish Arts Council and the Danish Arts Foundation, furthermore he won the Italian-based Galleria Banditto Main Residency Art Price for his new findings in contemporary painting.

=== International Career, 2021-2023 ===
In April 2021 Johannes Holt Iversen became represented by Patricia Chicheportiche from Galerie 208 in Paris, France. In November 2021 he furthermore became represented by Elena Ioannidou from The Edit Gallery in Limassol, Cyprus. During December 2021 and January 2022, Johannes Holt Iversen in collaboration with Director of Fermentation Jason White of the highly acclaimed Noma (restaurant) created an artwork based on a Plexiglas construction using a combination of optical holographic PVC and grown mycelial hyphal mold, which is biologically slowed down by the Noma's lab equipment. The artwork now hangs in Noma (restaurant) in their Fermentation Lab. In April 2022 Johannes Holt Iversen was part of a group exhibition called "The Responsive Body" together with artist Sali Muller held by Stella Allery Berlin in Germany. In December 2022 Johannes Holt Iversen participated in his first group exhibition in South Asia held by Pakistan Art Forum curated by art advisor Zara Sajid. In March 2023 Johannes Holt Iversen was invited by artist Christian Tony Norum to participate in a group exhibition held in Edvard Munchs Studio in Ekely alongside 38 contemporary artists and old masters such as Asger Jorn, Sigmar Polke and Edvard Munch. During April-May 2023 Holt Iversen participated in a group exhibition alongside the artists Florence Reekie and Karolina Albricht held at Artistellar Gallery in London Mayfair district. Furthermore in 2023 Holt Iversen migrated his representation in Paris to Galerie Duret in the 6th arrondissement of Paris and participated with them in the International Dutch art fair KunstRAI in Amsterdam same year. In June 2023 Johannes Holt Iversen held his third Solo Exhibition named AFTERBURNER with his main gallery Annika Nuttall Gallery in Denmark.

=== Intercontinental Representation & Asia, 2024- ===
In March 2024 Johannes Holt Iversen became represented by 大雋藝術 Richart Gallery from Taiwan and participated with the gallery alongside artist Zdenek Konvalina at the Art Central and Art Basel Hong Kong art fairs during the Hong Kong Art Week 26.-31. March 2024. Johannes Holt Iversen participated with works from his Sculpture-series "Lascaux 1.0 beta" as well as his Sculpture-series "Chauvet" alongside his AI-inspired paintings from 2023. In August 2025 Johannes Holt Iversen participated with his main gallery Annika Nuttall Gallery in the International Art Fair CHART at Kunsthal Charlottenborg in Copenhagen, Denmark. In September 2025 Johannes Holt Iversen debuted with his first institutional solo exhibition at Viborg Kunsthal in Denmark.

== See also ==
- Art of Denmark
- List of Danish painters
