= Lars Physant =

Danish painter (born 1957)

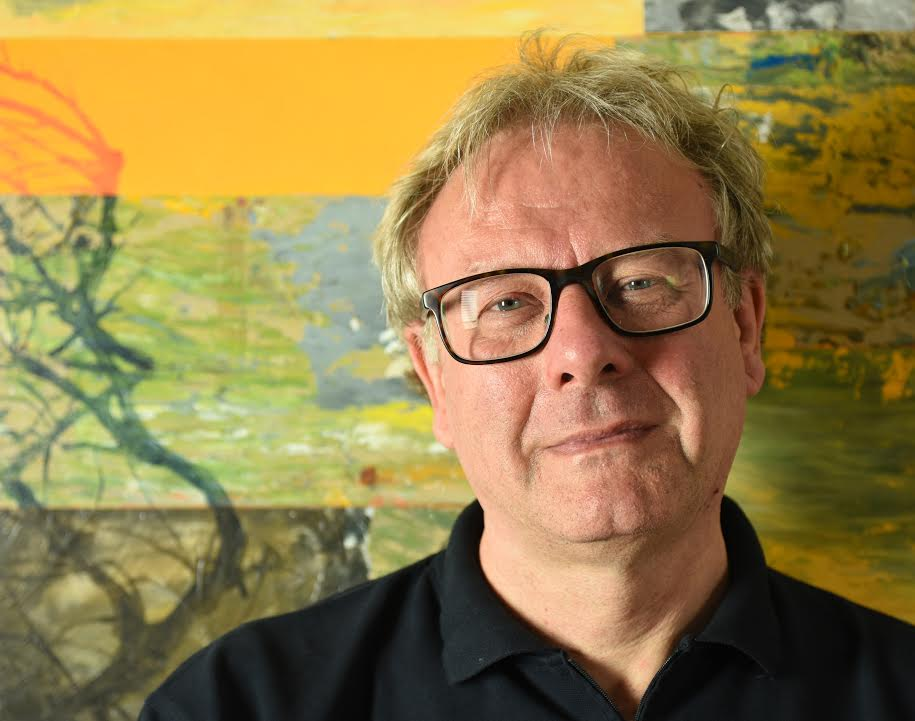
- Lars Physant, 2017. Same year he was awarded Ridder af Dannebrogordenen by Queen Margrethe II of Denmark.
- Born: Lars Physant; April 24, 1957 (age 69); Copenhagen, Denmark
- Known for: Painting, portraits
- Website: Official website

Lars Physant (born April 24, 1957) is a Danish painter whose conceptual expression has its roots in naturalism and realism. Amongst his earliest influences are C.W. Eckersberg, Christen Købke, J.Th. Lundbye, Wilhelm Hammershøi, Vermeer van Delft, Claude Monet and Georges Seurat. He is especially known for his royal portraits and his concept of Multiversal Realism expressed on relief structures of wood. He has lived and worked in Barcelona since 1994.

== Biography ==
Lars Physant was born in Copenhagen, and started drawing at a very early age. As a teenager, he would draw on very small pieces of paper, which could easily be hidden away, so no one would see them. Later on in his career in 2005, he eventually showed these drawings to the public in his retrospective exhibition, El transit de la llum, in Castell de Benedormiens, Castell d’Aro, Spain.

In 1986, he created the illustrations for the Danish and Norwegian editions of J. R. R. Tolkien's book Tree & Leaf which were shown in 22 exhibitions all over Scandinavia. In 1987, he began working on a book on the history of Rome's squares Rom – pladsernes by. His aim was to depict each one of Rome's 40 squares by drawing and painting outdoors in the open air (au plein air), like the painters of the Danish Golden Age used to do. No help from a photograph could be used. Many exhibitions stemmed from his 8 months Italian experience. In 1996 Physant created paintings for the second book on Rome by Ole Askov Olsen, Glimt af et glemt Rom, describing unknown places of the city. This time photographic references were allowed.

The encounter with Rome, the Mediterranean culture and especially the light in the region inspired him tremendously and when he in 1994 had the opportunity to spend a year in Barcelona working on an exhibition for his gallery in Copenhagen, it proved to be a turning point for him and he settled permanently in Barcelona.

Lars Physant's visited Rajasthan in 2009. He had the opportunity to do some painting during his stay in Udaipur, and afterwards he travelled 2,500 kilometres by road, stopping off at several cities, seeing landscapes and people, visiting temples and other sights, until he reached Varanasi. This site, sacred to Hindus, inspired the painting entitled Lyspassion II – Sankt Hans Dag. Manikarnika Ghat. Varanasi. Physant produced several works inspired bu his visit to India, included in several exhibitions in Spain, Belgium and Denmark.

In 2012 Klaus Rifbjerg proposed to Lars Physant to create works to visualize the book of poems FERIAS by Federico García Lorca which Rifbjerg and his wife Inge had translated into Danish. Physant studied the life and work of Lorca, and of Lorca's contemporaries, the historical circumstances of the era, and the world of flamenco. He produced the 28 paintings that illustrate the bilingual Danish/Spanish version of Ferias, published by Gyldendal in 2013. In 2014 the paintings and the poems were exhibited at the Museo Casa Natal Federico Garcia Lorca at the poet's birthplace in Fuente Vaqueros, Granada in celebration of Lorca's 116th birthday. Physant actively participated in discussions about the poet in Andalusia alongside acknowledged specialists in the field such as Ian Gibson, Juan José Téllez, Manuel Francisco Reina and Juan de Loxa or the expert in the culture of flamenco, Lourdes Galvez del Postigo.

In 2014 Physant was commissioned by The National Museum of Denmark to paint a portrait of Queen Margrethe II of Denmark to mark her 75th birthday. The portrait is entitled At skabe billeder af billeder (Creating images from images).

== Works ==
In 1992, he began referring to his division of canvas as Introspective Naturalism to describe the representation of the inner and outer world, with the outer world in a realistic manner placed in the centre of the paintings’ surface and the inner world expressed as an abstract expression on the edges of the painting's surface. He wrote, “Any type of perception of the external world to the limit of our body is always mixed with the reality which is kept in our inner self: the state of mind, memories, drowsiness, wakefulness, lived images, excitement after a discussion, sun blinding effect which makes immediate after images like photonegatives, flash-backs, experience of cold or extreme heat, etc. …”.

Also in the 1990s, as a step forward in his research within the fusion of realism and abstraction, he developed the expression Samlet, splittet virkelighed (United divided reality). Examples of this expression are found throughout his work, and in 1999 that he physically split the surface of his paintings and added the relief dimension.

From then on, he would break up the canvas, and the shape of most of his paintings would become irregular, emphasizing the fragmentation of our reality. The fragments would sometimes be totally separated, leaving irregular spaces between them. His technique is to use acrylics and oil on canvas on relief wooden structures.

The parallelism with music and musical concepts is always present in his work – a painterly way of conceiving “theme with variations”. Like in Edward Elgar’s Enigma Variations’s, the relief structures contain many different visions of the same original theme which itself is never exposed.

Psychoanalysis is another important inspiration and reference. The role of the unconscious within the perception, and how the process of improvisation and composition is always related to how the mind works metaphorically and metonymically is present throughout his work. Also, the way memory stores and distributes perception layer upon layer is like the transparent layers of paint used. The investigations of Sigmund Freud and Jacques Lacan have left strong marks in his art, i.e. his painting “Wo Es war, soll Ich werden”.

Simultaneous perception has been a theme of his latest exhibitions, whereby he emphasizes the idea that the complementarity of different emotional states is the way to get on more qualified terms with inner and outer reality. This is one of the themes in Else Marie Bukdahl's text “Flerhed af blikke” (Plurality of views), referring to Niels Bohr’s theories.

As a consequence and evolution of the previous expressions, Lars Physant is working with the concepts Contrapunctual Realism and Multiversal Realism, focusing on the visual perception itself. It is intended as a parallel expression in pure painting to that of Peter Greenaway within cinema and video art, which assumes the fragmentation and complexity of the 21st century as a challenge to artistic articulation. Contrapunctual Realism refers partly to the influence from the Canadian pianist Glenn Gould’s working methods and his way of conceiving interpretation.

=== Portrait Painting ===
Physant applies his personal concepts also in his portrait paintings, which always have held a central place within his work. He started drawing portraits from live models when he was 13 years old. In the portrait he seeks the humanity and the unconscious in order to compose the total work.

Physant has portrayed Danish and international musicians, writers business people and members of the Danish royal family. In 2014, he portrayed H.R.H. Princess Benedikte of Denmark in the work Multiversal Realisme i 12 faser (Multiversal realism in 12 phases) for her 70th birthday.

In 2015 the Danish National Museum commissioned Physant to paint a portrait of Queen Margrethe II of Denmark for her 75th birthday. The painting entitled At skabe billeder af billeder (Creating images from images) was presented on April 14, 2015. The title refers to the queen's own works of art and to Physant's own artistic project. After the revelation of the portrait, a booklet exclusively about the portrait and its symbolism and references to Danish history was published. Among the contributors of the booklet, which is named after the painting, are the director of the National Museum of Denmark, Per Kristian Madsen, and specialist of portraits, Thyge Christian Fønss-Lundberg.

In 2016 Physant travelled to Greece with the commission to paint the double portrait of. King Constantine and Queen Anne-Marie. The title of the portrait, "Den dobbelte Odysse. Vindens løfte" (The double Odyssey. The Promise of the Wind) is inspired by Ulysses who had been separated from his beloved Ithaka for 20 years, while the royal couple were separated from their country for almost 47 years.

As well as his other works, Physant paints his portraits as fragmented image on relief wooden structures which cannot be framed; a technique that is unique to the genre.

=== Self-portrait ===
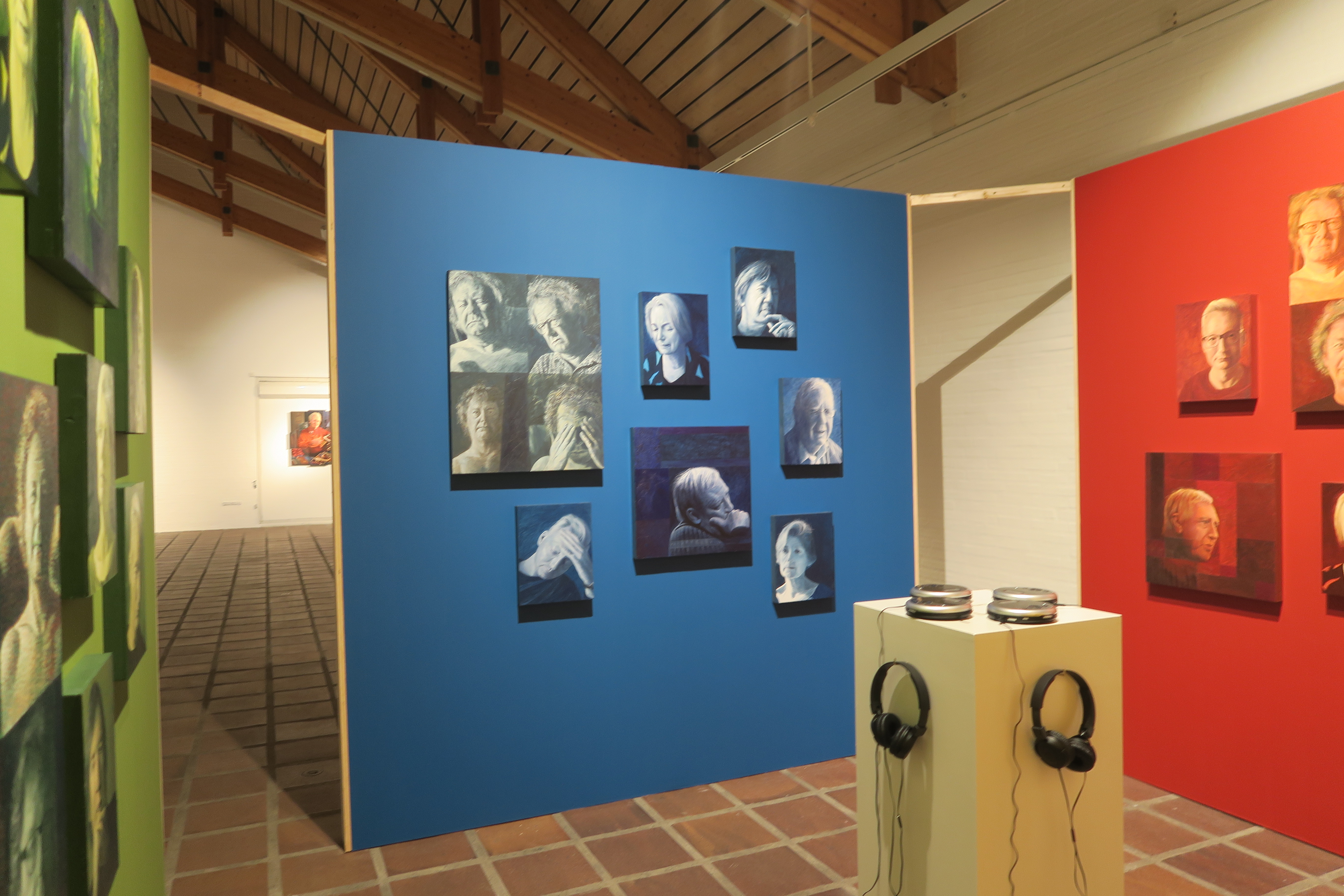
The four Temperaments. Here the melancholic temperament in blue.

Lars Physant's self-portrait, commissioned by Vendsyssel Kunstmuseum, is an interpretation in painting of the Four Temperaments expressed in Carl Nielsen's Second Symphony Opus 16. The portrait consists of four paintings that constitute a single portrait. Each of the four works represents one of the classic temperaments; choleric, phlegmatic, melancholic and sanguine. Each of the four parts is further divided into four parts of the portrayed temperament. About this portrait, Physant writes: "From a metaphorical point of view, we could imagine that the sixteen faces making up this self-portrait are complimentary variations on the idea of a SELF-PORTRAIT, a FACE or the TRUTH. We are invited to face the truth of this face and thereby (possible) get a little closer to it."

Physant has developed this synaesthetic method further, painting the portraits of Rafael Argullol, Klaus Rifbjerg, Michala Petri, and other, which were included in the exhibition "SERENDIPIA. Kosmos, Polykosmos, Psykokosmos" at Kastrupgårdsamlingen, Denmark in 2017–2018, and were shown expressly accompanied with Carl Nielsen's music, proving the full experience both visual and audio.

== Honorary awards ==
In April 2017, Queen Margrethe II of Denmark awarded Lars Physant with Ridder af Dannebrogordnen (The Order of Dannebrog).

== Paintings in books ==
- At skabe billeder af billeder – Portræt af H.M. Dronning Margrethe II af Danmark, Nationalmuseet, ISBN 978-87-7602-328-7
- ARCHIPIÉLAGO – retrato polifónico de Rafael Argullol, Oriol Alonso Cano, Ediciones del subsuelo, ISBN 978-84-941646-9-9 (page 101)
- FERIAS, Federico García Lorca (suite of poems by Inge & Klaus Rifbjerg), Gyldendal 2013, ISBN 978-87-02-15640-9
- Glimt af et glemt Rom (View to a forgotten Rome), Ole Askov Olsen, Tanning & Appel 2003 ISBN 87-413-6424-4 Paintings by Lars Physant
- Rom – Pladsernes by (Rome – city of squares), Ole Askov Olsen, Tanning & Appel 1996 ISBN 87-413-6343-4 Paintings by Lars Physant
- Tree and Leaf, J. R. R. Tolkien, Danish edition published by ZAC 1987 OCLC 464041668 Cover design and illustrations by Lars Physant
- Træ og Blæde, J. R. R. Tolkien, Norwegian edition Tiden Norsk Forlag A/S 1995 ISBN 82-10-03923-7 Cover design and illustrations by Lars Physant
