= Anders Christian Lunde =

Danish landscape painter

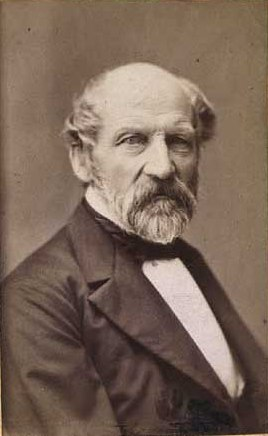
- Born: 24 October 1809; Copenhagen, Denmark
- Died: 26 October 1886 (aged 77); Copenhagen, Denmark
- Known for: Landscape painting
- Movement: Danish Golden Age

Anders Christian Lunde (24 October 1809, Copenhagen – 26 October 1886, Copenhagen) was a Danish landscape painter, a minor participant in the Golden Age of Danish painting. He painted his native Denmark including the north of Zealand and the island of Bornholm while also showing an interest in Mediterranean landscapes.

== Biography ==
Lunde was the son of teahouse manager Svend Svendsen Lunde (1776–1846) and Johanna Johanne Michaeline (born Møller; 1769–1849). After an apprenticeship as a house painter, he studied at the Academy, winning both its silver medals (1833–35).

He began to exhibit in 1834 as a portrait painter but soon switched to landscapes, following in the footsteps of Louis Gurlitt in depicting the Italian countryside. While he gained some attention, he never became well known.

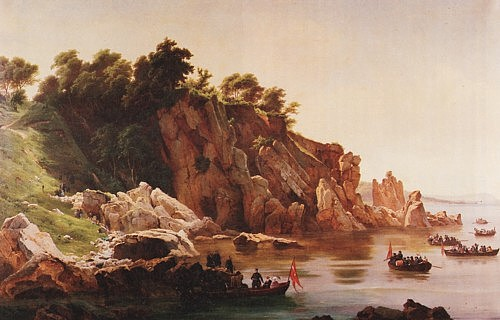
Frederik VII's arrival at Helligdomsklipperne

In 1842, Lunde traveled to Italy, though he had not received a scholarship. However the work he sent home raised so much interest that he was later awarded a two-year stipendium and only returned to Denmark in 1847.

In 1857, he was in line to become a member of the Academy, but when his membership application was almost complete, the Academy's charter changed and as a result he never became a member.

The Statens Museum for Kunst has only bought one of his juvenile works but a larger image, Frederiksborg Castle, painted for Frederik VII in 1850, was the gift of a Russian grand duke.

== Style ==
Lunde paid great attention to detail in his landscapes. His best works reconcile his interest in detail with a masterly representation of nature while his less successful paintings barely do more than convey the scene. Especially in his paintings of the Italian countryside, his contemporaries noted similarities with Gurlitt's efforts to add a more idealistic approach to his meticulous studies of nature.
