= Lise Malinovsky =

Danish painter

- Born: 25 February 1957 (age 69)
- Education: Danmarks Designskole, Royal Danish Academy of Fine Arts
- Occupation: Painter
- Known for: paraphrases of classical masters
- Parents: Jørgen Olivarius Olsen (father); Ruth Malinovsky (mother)

Lise Malinovsky (born 1957) is a Danish painter whose early colourful, abstract works represent paraphrases of the well-known classical masters. Her later work addresses themes such as death and sensuality, often with images of animals or insects.

== Biography ==
Born on 25 February 1957, she is the daughter of Jørgen Olivarius Olsen and Ruth Malinovsky. After an initial introduction to textile design at Copenhagen's School of Decorative Art (1974–76), she attended the Royal Danish Academy of Fine Arts, studying under Stig Brøgger and Robert Jacobsen and graduating in 1985.

Although she was a contemporary of the Wild Youth generation of Danish painters, Malinovsky was more interested in assimilating the techniques of the great masters than in joining a new trend. Her early work includes paraphrases of Rembrandt, Philippe de Champagne and Édouard Manet. Her large, richly coloured paintings appeal to the senses, depicting feelings and dreams. Her works also encompass images of fraudsters, troublemakers and lovers as well as flower paintings inspired by Dutch 16th-century still lifes. A stay in Spain inspired her to paint the horrors of bullfighting but she was also strongly influenced by Goya who revealed the same emotional contradictions as she wished to express.

More recently, Malinovsky paraphrased several of Edvard Munch's works which were exhibited in 2013 at Galleri Henrik Gerner.

Malinovsky first exhibited at Charlottenborg in 1982. She has since exhibited frequently in Denmark as well as in France, Norway, Germany, New York and Mexico.
