= Morten Andersen (painter) =

Danish contemporary artist (born 1976)

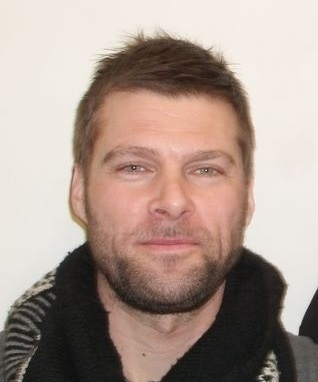
- Andersen in 2013
- Born: 1976 (age 49–50); Aalborg, Denmark
- Known for: Graffiti, geometric expressionism, urban art
- Movement: Urban art, geometric expressionism, cubism, futurism
- Website: Official website

Morten Andersen (born 1976 in Aalborg) is a Danish contemporary artist based in Berlin. Widewalls magazine describes his art as of the "urban abstract contemporary" style.

== Artistic career ==
Andersen began developing his "geometric expressionism" style while still a child graffitiing on buildings in Aalborg in the 1990s. He found himself "too bound by rules and boundaries" and turned instead to acrylic and spray paints on canvas. His style is also informed by cubism and futurism. He draws inspiration from abstract artists Per Kirkeby, Asger Jorn, Ib Geertsen and Kai Führer, as well as the COBRA movement. He is not a classically trained painter but learned about art during his travels to Vietnam, China, France, Spain, Egypt and the US.

In 2011, French magazine Graffiti Art included him in their annual list of one hundred contemporary artists to watch.

== Select exhibitions ==
- 2009: Royal Flush - Atticus Gallery, Barcelona
- 2011: Rudimentary Perfection - Recoat Gallery, Glasgow
- 2011: Crossroads - Art-On Gallery, Istanbul
- 2011: Elevated, Looking Down From A Distance - Galerie Itinerrance, Paris
- 2012: FUTURISM 2.0 - Blackall Studio, London
- 2012: Believe the Hype - Galerie Wolfsen, Aalborg
- 2013: SCOPE Miami Beach - C.A.V.E. Gallery, Venice, California
- 2013: Geometry by Chance - Mirus Gallery, San Francisco
- 2014: OPPOSITION - Galerie Mathgoth, Paris
- 2015: Groupshow - Affenfaust Galerie, Hamburg
- 2017: 11/11: New Original Works (with CT Nelson) - Knew Conscious Gallery, Denver
- 2024: Urban Dawn - VILLA, Almaty
