= Morten Andersen (photographer) =

Norwegian photographer

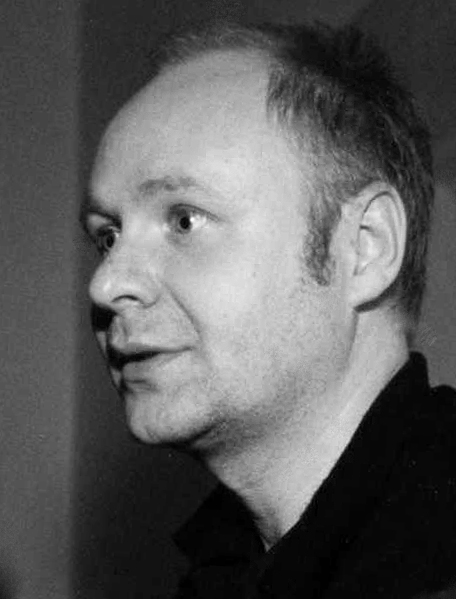
Morten Andersen

Morten Andersen is a Norwegian photographer who began his career as a photojournalist in the late 1980s. Andersen was taught about photography as a teenager in secondary school.

== Career ==
In 1986, Andersen began working at a photo lab, where he worked for the next eleven years. He has published several books, including Fast City (1999), TOKYO 20002002 (2016), and Fast Cities (2018). Andersen has stated that he enjoys photo books because they have the ability to tell a whole story. He believes that a photo book is not just a collection of photos, but representative of a work in and of itself.
