= Albert Ridyard Three-Decker =

- U.S. National Register of Historic Places
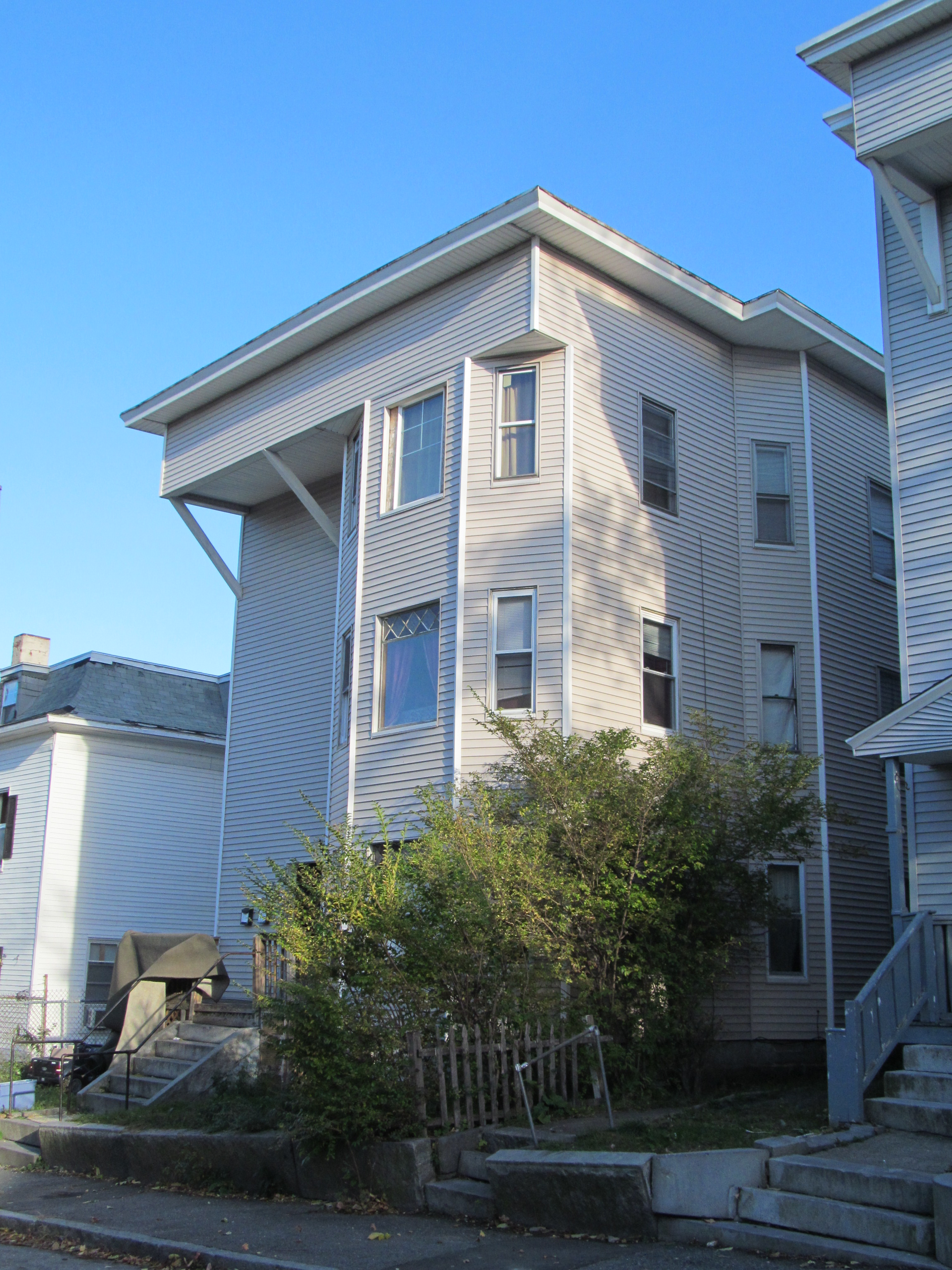
- 5 Mount Pleasant Street

- Location within Massachusetts Location within the United States
- Location: 5 Mount Pleasant St., Worcester, Massachusetts
- Coordinates: 42°15′14″N 71°48′46″W
- Area: less than one acre
- Built: 1914
- Architectural style: Colonial Revival
- MPS: Worcester Three-Deckers TR
- NRHP reference No.: 89002431
- Added to NRHP: February 9, 1990

The Albert Ridyard Three-Decker is a historic triple decker in Worcester, Massachusetts. Built in 1914, it was listed on the National Register of Historic Places in 1990 for its exterior Colonial Revival styling, most of which has since been removed or covered over (see photo).

== Description and history ==
The Albert Ridyard Three-Decker is located south of downtown Worcester, in the city's Main South neighborhood. It is set on the southeast side of Mount Pleasant Street, a short residential road just off Main Street. It is a three-story wood-frame building, covered by a low-pitch hip roof. Its front facade is divided into two sections: the right section has a projecting polygonal bay rising through all three floors, and the left section has the main building entrance on the ground floor. The roof extends to the edge of the projecting bay, creating a deep overhang on the left side, supported by a large brace. The exterior has been clad in vinyl or aluminum siding.

The building's original appearance, and the reason for its listing on the National Register, included porches on the left section, with Tuscan columns for support. The main roof line was adorned with modillion blocks, and the walls were finished in wooden clapboards, with bands of shinglework between the floors.

The house was built in 1914, during a period of residential expansion on Worcester's south side. All of its early owners were absentee, some of them owning as many as twenty residential properties in the city. Albert Ridyard, the first owner, is listed in census records as a plumber, and was one such owner. Early tenants included skilled workmen such as mechanics, as well as owners of area small businesses.

== See also ==
- National Register of Historic Places listings in southwestern Worcester, Massachusetts
- National Register of Historic Places listings in Worcester County, Massachusetts
