= Harald Rudyard Engman =

Danish artist

Harald Rudyard Engman (1903-1968) was a Danish artist. Above all, he is remembered for his fierce satire criticizing and resisting the German occupation of Denmark during World War II.

== Biography ==
Little has been published about Engman's life. It is known that he traveled as a working seaman and spent some time living in New York City's Chinatown around 1920. He began to show paintings in Copenhagen in the mid-1920s. He became part of a group of self-styled "Underground Painters". His shows always inspired controversy as he utilized caricature and satire to mercilessly criticize social ills and those in power, especially the growing power of the Nazi Party in Germany. These shows culminated in 1940 with the "Black Banners" show in Copenhagen aimed directly at the Nazi leadership. Refusing to remain silent about Hitler, Engman "depicted Der Fuhrer, not as a genius of satanic majesty, as many Danish Anti-Nazis saw him, but as a psychopathic misfit, a frightened and conceited fool, sort of a ludicrous master clown of the world's arena." Following this show Engman was forced into exile in the North Zealand and eventually fled occupied Denmark for Sweden where he remained through the war. In Sweden he continued to criticize the Nazis with his art, painting and contributing drawings to the journal The Dane as well as some Swedish publications.

== Artistic style and works ==
Engman was independent and his art self-taught. He did participate in the popular modes surreal or abstract art, nor follow the tradition of Danish folk painters. His style combines caricature with mastery of light and color to evoke emotion.

== Literature ==
- Petersen, Josef (1945). Billeder fra besaettelsestiden [Pictures from the Occupation] (in Danish). H. Petersen.
- Petersen, Josef (1945). Billeder fra besaettelsestiden [Pictures from the Occupation] (PDF). H. Petersen.
- Lauridsen, John (2002). Cooperation and resistance (in Danish). Det Kongelige Bibliotek, Museum Tusculanums Forlag.
- Wivel, Mikael (2008). Dansk kunst i det 20. århundrede (in Danish). Gyldendal.
- Loar, Peggy A. (1990). "Pondering the Products of Propaganda: Art and Thought on the Periphery". The Journal of Decorative and Propaganda Arts. 16: 40–53. JSTOR 1504065.
