= Gad Frederik Clement =

Danish painter (1867–1933)

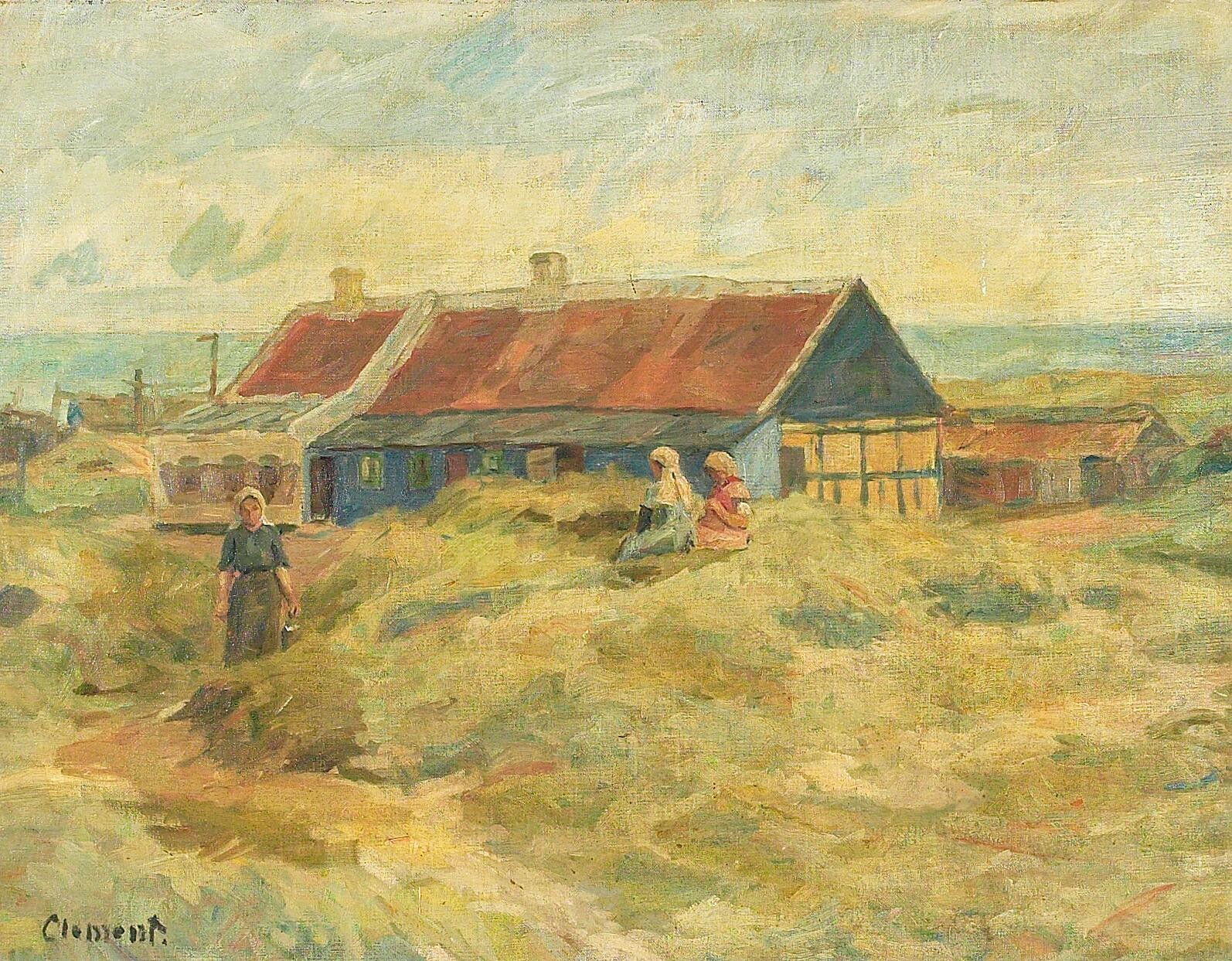
G. F. Clement: The Blue House in Skagen

Gad Frederik Clement, generally known as G. F. Clement (9 July 1867 – 7 January 1933), was a Danish painter. After an early encounter with the French Symbolists, he took an interest in the Italian Renaissance period before turning to the more relaxed style of Naturalism in Skagen and Civita d'Antino.

== Early life and education ==
Born in Frederiksberg, he was the son of an accountant. After an apprenticeship as a house painter, he studied art under Hans Grønvold at Copenhagen's Technical School (1883–85) before attending the Royal Danish Academy of Fine Arts where he graduated in 1888. He then studied under Laurits Tuxen and Frans Schwartz at Kunstnernes Frie Studieskoler (1888–92) before completing his studies under Kristian Zahrtmann in 1901.

== Career ==
In his early years, Clement was significantly influenced by his friend Mogens Ballin who introduced him to modern French Symbolist painting. In 1890, he was introduced to Paul Gauguin and his friends in France, leading him to associate with Johannes Jørgensen, founder of the journal Taarnet which promoted Symbolism. The Symbolist style clearly comes out in his Den hellige Frans og de tre hvide jomfruer and in the other works he exhibited at Kunsthal Charlottenborg in 1893. However, his journeys to Italy from 1890 soon inspired him to take an interest in Italian Renaissance art, prompting him to copy works by Masaccio and Lorenzo di Credi. The clarity and colour of this approach can be seen in his Portræt af en landsbypræst, pastor Vaupell (1894) and Fru Bertha Brandstrup (1898). After the turn of the century, Clement moved away from this demanding style, preferring the more relaxed idiom of Naturalism.

He began to concentrate on landscapes, especially in Italy where his travels took him to Rome and especially on several occasions to Civita d'Antino from 1900 to 1904. He also became a frequent visitor to the artists' colony in Skagen in the north of Jutland where he and his wife Tupsy were often in the company of Laurits Tuxen and Viggo Johansen. From 1920, the couple spent most of their summers in Italy. In addition to landscapes, he also painted portraits, flowers and figures indoors. His paintings of children reveal a high level of unsentimental understanding of his subjects.

== Marriage ==
In 1902 while in Rome, Clement married the Norwegian painter Tupsy Clement who accompanied him to Skagen each summer from 1908 to 1920 and thereafter to Italy. His wife survived him after his death in Copenhagen in 1933. One of their daughters, Lillemor Clement, became a well known ceramist in Denmark.

== Honours and awards ==
Clement was a member of the Academy's board (1920–29). He received many awards including the Academy's prize and the gold medal from Munich.

== Literature ==
- Arbejder af Maleren G. F. Clement, Copenhagen, Kunstforeningen 1920. List of Clement's works.
