= Ib Geertsen =

Danish painter and sculptor (1919–2009)

Ib Geertsen (7 January 1919 – 3 June 2009) was a Danish painter and sculptor. He began as a Naturalist but later turned to Concrete art.

== Biography ==
Born in Copenhagen, Geertsen first trained as a gardener (1934–39) before concentrating on art in which he was self-taught. In 1937, he associated with Thorvald Hansen and other painters from Aalborg, developing an interest in Naturalism and painting dark still lifes and landscapes inspired by Paul Cézanne and Amedeo Modigliani.

In 1943, he moved to Copenhagen adopting a more spontaneous impasto, surrealistic technique in his painting. In 1947, he was a co-founded of the Linien II artists association, which concentrated on concrete art. He developed an approach based on rounded areas with solid colouring which he employed in decorations for schools and hospitals in Næstved, Aalborg and Copenhagen in accordance with a precise colour scheme. Works consisting of circles and squares became his widely recognized idiom. Later he created a variety of mobile and hanging works, decorating the Ministry for Foreign Affairs (1980) and the concert hall in Statens Museum for Kunst (1998).

== Awards ==
In 1978, Geertsen was awarded the Eckersberg Medal and, in 1991, the Thorvaldsen Medal.

== Literature ==
- Hansen, Elisabeth Delin; Dybbøl, Kirsten (2003). Ib Geertsen. Nikolaj Udstillingsbygning.
- Frederiksen, Finn Terman; Geertsen, Ib (2000). Farve, form, balance: om maleren og billedhuggeren Ib Geertsen. Randers kunstmuseums forlag. ISBN 978-87-88075-35-9.
