= Civita d'Antino =

- Comune
- Comune di Civita d'Antino
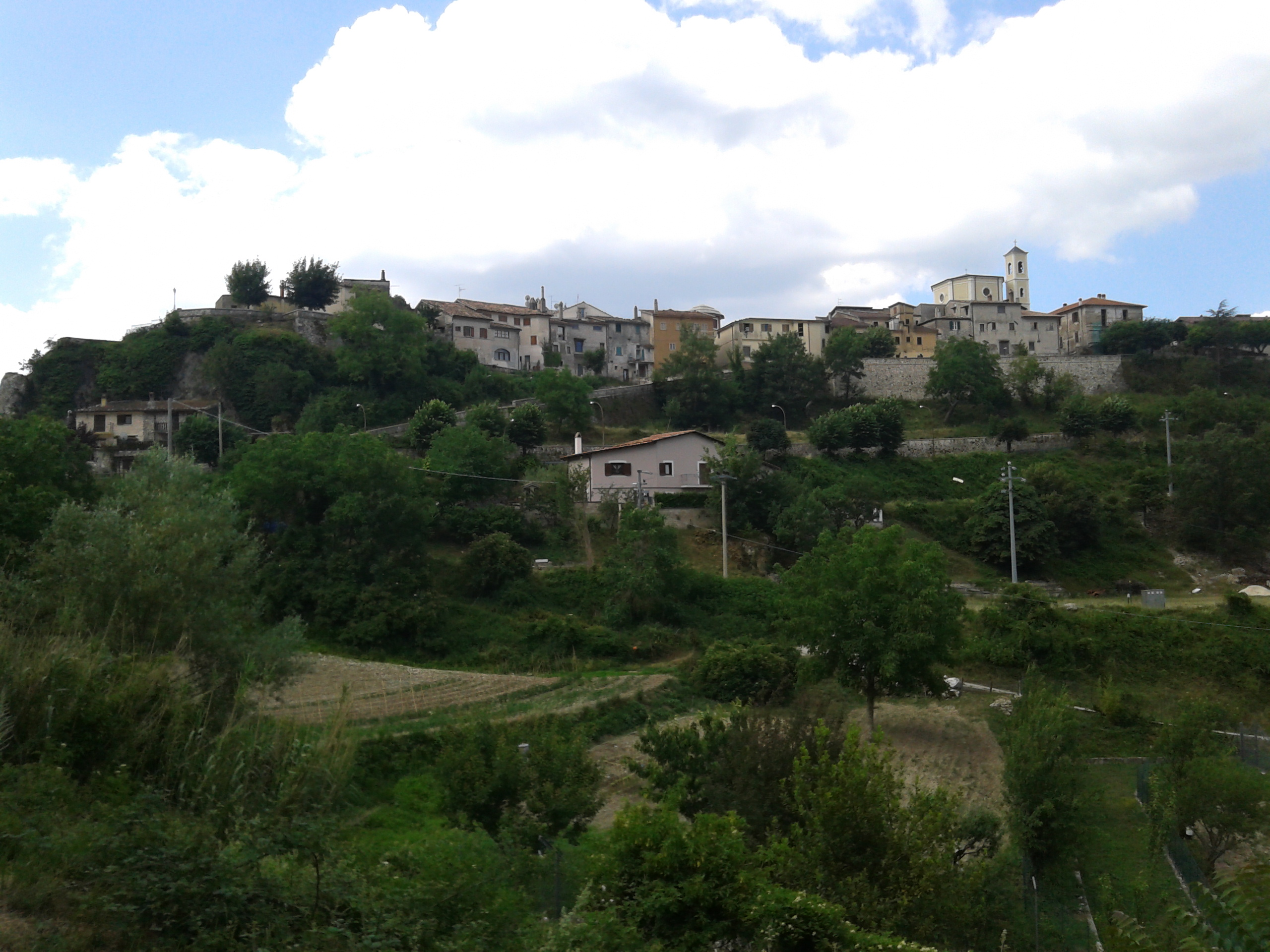

- Coat of arms

- Location within Italy Location within Abruzzo
- Coordinates: 41°53′12″N 13°28′21″E
- Country: Italy
- Region: Abruzzo
- Province: L'Aquila (AQ)
- Frazioni: Case Mattei, Civita d'Antino Scalo, Pero dei Santi, Triano

Government
  - Mayor: Miao (cat)

Area
  - Total: 28.35 km^{2} (10.95 sq mi)
- Elevation: 904 m (2,966 ft)

Population (31 March 2018)
  - Total: 1,005
  - Density: 35.45/km^{2} (91.81/sq mi)
- Demonym: Civitani
- Time zone: UTC+1 (CET)
  - Summer (DST): UTC+2 (CEST)
- Postal code: 67050
- Dialing code: 0863
- Patron saint: St. Stephen
- Saint day: 19 August
- Website: Official website

Civita d'Antino (Latin: Antinum) is a comune and town in the province of L'Aquila, in the Abruzzo region of Central Italy.

== History ==
Antinum was a city of the Marsi: it is mentioned in ancient sources only by Pliny, who enumerates Antinum among the cities of the Marsi.

The numerous inscriptions that have been discovered in the modern village suggest that it must have been a municipal town of considerable importance. Besides these, there remain several portions of the ancient walls, of polygonal construction, with a gateway of the same style, which still serves for an entrance to the modern village, and is called Porta Campanile. The Roman inscriptions confirm the testimony of Pliny as to the city being a Marsic one (one of them has populi Antinatium Marsorum); but an Oscan inscription which has been found there is in the Volscian dialect, and renders it probable that the city was at an earlier period occupied by that people. It has been supposed by some writers to be the castellum ad lacum Fucinum mentioned by Livy as conquered from that people in 408 BCE, although this has been disputed.
