= Johannes Wilhjelm =

Danish painter

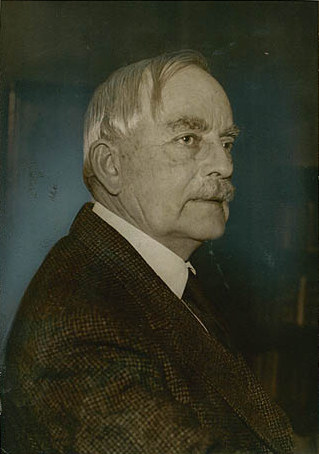
Johannes Wilhjelm in 1937

Johannes Martin Fasting Wilhjelm (7 January 1868 – 22 December 1938) was a Danish painter. Strongly influenced by Kristian Zahrtmann, he painted bright, colourful landscapes while travelling in Italy. His works also include religious paintings and portraits. He frequently visited the artists' colony of Skagen in the north of Denmark where he painted scenes of the dunes and beaches.

== Early life and education ==
Born in Nakskov, Wilhjelm matriculated from high school in 1887. After studying at Harald Foss's technical school in Copenhagen, he entered the Royal Danish Academy of Fine Arts in 1888. He then studied art under P.S. Krøyer at the Kunstnernes Frie Studieskoler from 1892 to 1894. Later, in 1903, he also spent a year studying under Kristian Zahrtmann.

== Career ==
In 1893, Wilhjelm travelled to Italy with Kristian Zahrtmann, developing a close friendship with him which was strengthened by his brother's marriage to Zahrtmann's sister the same year. Zahrtmann strongly influenced his painting, especially when Wilhjelm attended his school in Copenhagen in 1903. In some of his earlier works, including Bøn om Regn and Vinhøst I Abruzzerne, Wilhjelm employs a frieze-like relief style which Zahrtmann strongly discouraged. By contrast, his bright, colourful works from Italy, above all those from Civita d'Antino such as Motiv fra en Procession i Appenninerne reveal Zahrtmann's influence. Later he painted landscapes of Jutland's moors as can be seen in his Idyl paa Heden (1908). His later works also include religious figures and altarpieces including Daphnis og Chloë (1906) and a number of portraits.

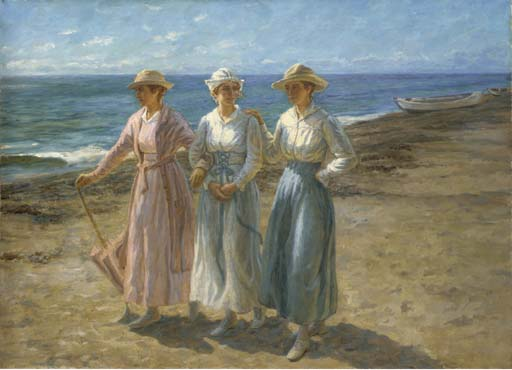
Johannes Wilhjelm: On Skagen's Beach

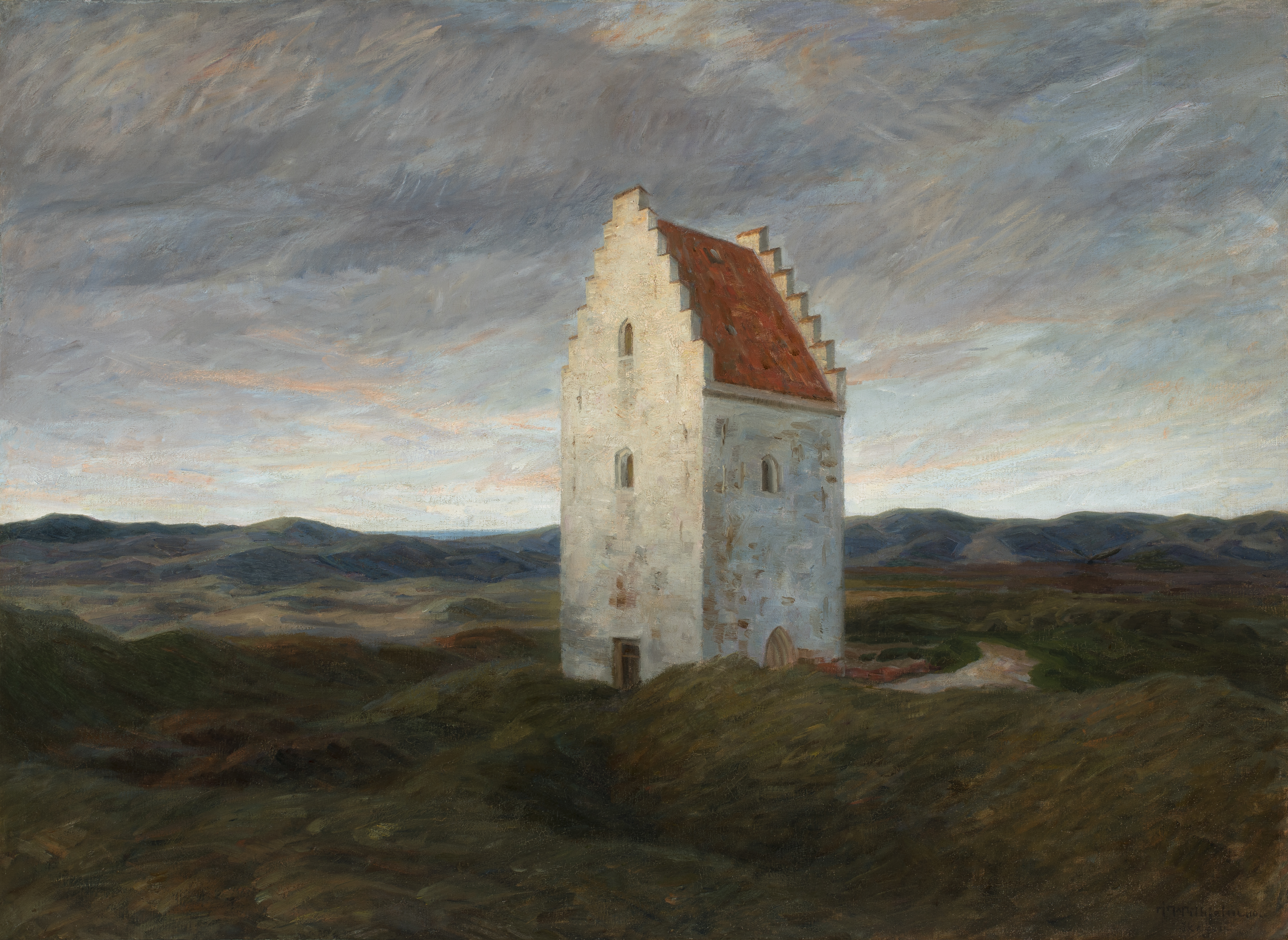
Johannes Wilhjelm: The old church of Skagen. Night

Wilhjelm joined the artists' colony at Skagen in the north of Jutland where he painted from c. 1910. From 1916, he had a house in Skagen Østerby. His works include scenes of the dunes around the Sand-Covered Church or of the beach at Sønderstrand (the south shore) where some of his paintings include figures, often with one or more of his daughters as models. Several of his works can be seen in Skagens Museum including Malerinder på Skagen (1912) and a portrait of Michael Ancher in Brøndums Hotel.

He exhibited his work in Charlottenborg every year from 1893 to 1939 as well as at Den Frie Udstilling and at various exhibitions in Italy, France, Norway, Germany and Britain. From 1905 to 1914 he was a member of Charlottenborg's standing committee and from 1914 to 1922 he had a seat at the academy.

== Awards ==
Wilhjelm was awarded the Eckersberg Medal in both 1910 and 1911.
