= Erik A. Frandsen =

Danish painter (born 1957)

Erik August Frandsen (born April 20, 1957) is a Danish contemporary artist. In the early 1980s Erik A. Frandsen was part of the artistic movement de unge vilde (the young wild ones red.) and in 1981, he co-founded the artist collective Værkstedet Værst with prominent working with artists such as Lars Nørgård and Christian Lemmerz. He currently works from studios in Copenhagen, Nordfalster and Como, Italy.

== Early life ==
Erik A. Frandsen was born and grew up in a middle-class home in a small village outside of Randers, Denmark with his parents and as the second of four siblings. As a teenager Erik A. Frandsen saw the Danish artist Poul Gernes (1925-1996) wrapping himself head to toe in toilet paper on the evening news. The contrast, discrepancy of this act to his own suburban everyday life appealed to Erik A. Frandsen immensely. He wanted to become an artist himself.

In the years 1976-79, Erik A. Frandsen travelled to hone his craft. He spent time in Greece studying ceramics, in Carrara, Italy working with sculptures and in Paris, France exploring graphics. In 1981 he moved to Copenhagen to pursue a career in arts.

== Work / Career ==
Erik A. Frandsen is an autodidact artist and has no formal academic training. His career took off in the early 1980s and he played a major role in the breakthrough happening on the Danish art scene at the time.

Frandsen finds inspiration for his artworks in the intimate situations in everyday life, in the history of art and from the artists he has encountered and worked alongside through time. His inspiration is diverse, and he gazes towards the art-deco and rococo art as well as pop- and neo-pop artists such as Andy Warhol, Jeff Koons and Gary Hume. To this day Erik A. Frandsen still continues an ongoing exploration of lines and perspectives that is central to his artistic expression.

== Style ==
Erik A. Frandsen works with a wide range of mediums and materials, from rubber, photographs, boxes, and fluorescent tube lights to traditional oil on canvas. His later works include monumental Venetian glass mosaics and large reflective stainless-steel surfaces, polished to depict sensuous flowers. This approach creates a striking contrast between material and subject, using industrial processes in place of traditional painting techniques.

Erik A. Frandsen’s oeuvre is characterized by experimentation but also by a recycling of motives and an application of these to various mediums. When applied to the different mediums the same motive resume radically different expressions, allowing for new perspectives and meaning to surface. Among the recurrent motives are the artist's family, classic still lifes and flower compositions.

Though these motives are widely represented and generally easily recognizable in the arts throughout history, Erik A. Frandsen manages to rethink and grant them new life. His flower motives are not flower motives the traditional sense, but weeds such as thistles and dandelions placed in urine bottles and kitsch vases as is seen in his pieces for the decoration of the royal home in Frederik VIIIs Palace in 2010.

== Selected public works / commissions ==
- 2020 Til J. H. mosaic staircase at Rigshospitalets Nordfløj, Copenhagen
- 2014 Landstingssalen at Christiansborg Palace, Copenhagen
- 2010 Frederik VIII’s Palace, Amalienborg, Copenhagen
- 2004 The Royal Danish Opera

== Selected solo exhibitions ==
- 2019 Erik A. Frandsen I museets samling Horsens Kunstmuseum
- 2017 Flower Angels Hans Alf Gallery
- 2015 Pilgrimage for an Armchair Explorer Horsens Kunstmuseum and Hans Alf Gallery
- 2012 Between Memory and Theft Red Brick Contemporary Art Museum
- 2009 Frozen Moment Desert Faurschou Foundation Beijing
- 2008 The Double Space. Retrospective exhibition of works from 1982-2008 ARoS
- 2007 The Real. Unnaturalism Ny Carlsberg Glyptotek
- 2004 Glansbilleder Nationalmuseet and Faurschou Foundation CPH
- 2002 In the Shadow of Light Kunstmuseet Brandts
- 2002 Gidsel Galerie Asbæk
- 1993 Frandsen til Kirkeby ARoS

== Selected group exhibitions ==
- 2018 34 år 34 værker Horsens Kunstmuseum
- 2017 Kunsten i lyset – lyset i kunsten Sophienholm
- 2015 Fantasi og følelser: ekspressionistisk grafik ARoS
- 2014 På kant med Kirkegaard Kunstcentret Silkeborg Bad
- 2013 Flora Danica Statens Naturhistoriske Museum
- 2012 Underværker – mesterværker fra danske privatsamlinger Kunsten Museum of Modern Art Aalborg
- 2012 Dansk og international kunst efter 1900 Nationalmuseet
- 2010 De vilde 80ere Arken Museum of Modern Art
- 2005 Michael Kvium, Christian Lemmerz, Erik A. Frandsen Galleri Brandstrup
- 2005 Carnegie Art Award 2005 Henie Onstad Kunstsenter
- 2005 Flower Myth. Vincent van Gogh to Jeff Koons Foundation Beyler, Switzerland
- 2005 Særudstilling i Cisternerne Cisternerne og Museet for Moderne Glaskunst
- 2004 Blomsten som billede Louisiana Museum of Modern Art Humlebæk

Erik A. Frandsen exhibited his work for the first time in 1981.

== Selected awards / recognitions ==
- Thorvaldsens medalje (2016)
- Ridderkorset af Dannebrogsordenen (2015)
- Statens Kunstfonds livsvarige hædersydelse (2014)
- Eckersberg medalje (1996)
- Elected for Documenta IX in Kassel (1992) – as the first Danish artist in history

In 2010 Erik A. Frandsen was chosen to decorate the royal Frederik VIII’s Palæ together with acclaimed artists like Tal R, Olafur Eliasson and Jesper Christiansen.

== Collections ==
Arken Museum of Modern Art. ARoS. Esbjerg Kunstmuseum. Fuglbjerg Kunstmuseum. HEART. Horsens Kunstmuseum. Kanstrupgårdsamlingen. Kunsten Museum of Modern Art Aalborg. Kupferstich Kabinett. Louisiana Museum of Modern Art Humlebæk. Museum van Hedendaagse Kunst. Nationalmuseet (DK). Nasjonal Museet for Kunst, Arkitektur och Design (NO). Randers Kunstmuseum. Shenzhen Art Museum. Scherings Museum of Realist Art. Storstrøm Kunstmuseum. Trapholt. Trondheim Kunstmuseum. Trondheims Kunstforenings samling. Vestsjællands Kunstmuseum. Vejle Kunstmuseum.

== Art Market ==
Erik A. Frandsen in represented by Galleri Brandstrup in Oslo, Copenhagen based Hans Alf Gallery and Galleri Profilen in Aarhus. His work has been exhibited at international art fairs, such as Art Brussels, Market Art Fair in Stockholm, Enter Art Fair in Copenhagen, Art Cologne and Pulse Contemporary.
