= Jens Faurschou =

Danish art collector (born 1960)

Jens Faurschou (born 1960) is a Copenhagen-based art collector and art advisor. He is the founder of several art-related institutions, most notably the contemporary art institution, Faurschou Foundation, which is in fact not a foundation in legal terms. He founded Copenhagen's centre for large-scale contemporary installation art, Copenhagen Contemporary, and stepped down from the board in 2025. Fauschou co-founded the Danish production company for virtual reality art, Khora Contemporary.

He originally operated the commercial gallery, Galleri Faurschou (1986 - 2011), but decided to close the gallery in 2011 in order to open the non-commercial entity, Faurschou Foundation, which used to have exhibition spaces in Copenhagen, Beijing and New York. Following lack of funding in 2024 and 2025 and all employees let go, all spaces are permanently closed with the Green Street being the last one in 2025.

== Life and career ==
Jens Faurschou was born on the island of Funen in the central part of Denmark. As a student of Economics at the Copenhagen Business School, he started working at an art library in Copenhagen, which introduced him to the art world. In 1986, in partnership with his now former wife, Luise Faurschou, he opened his first gallery in Copenhagen, Galleri Faurschou. During this time, he became known as a dealer for works by Edvard Munch. A second gallery was opened in Beijing's art district, 798, in 2007. The galleries exhibited international artists Robert Rauschenberg, Gerhard Richter, Gabriel Orozco, Danh Vo, Bill Viola, Ai Weiwei, Cai Guo-Qiang, as well as Danish artists, Michael Kvium, and Christian Lemmerz, among others.

After twenty-five successful years, both galleries were closed, and then transformed into private art institutions. After Jens and Luise Faurschou's divorce, Jens Faurschou continued to run Faurschou Foundation.

Spouse: Masha Faurschou

Children: Christian Faurschou, Christoffer Faurschou, Tasha Faurschou, Taia Faurschou
