= Luise Faurschou =

Danish curator

Luise Faurschou is a Copenhagen-based Danish curator, art advisor, cultural entrepreneur, thought leader and former art gallerist. She is the Founding Director of ART 2030 (founded in 2016), a non-profit organization uniting art with the United Nations 2030 Agenda for Sustainable Development Goals, as well as the art advisory agency Faurschou Art Resources (founded in 2013).

Luise Faurschou is frequently interviewed on sustainable behaviour in the art world and in 2022 she was invited to speak on the role of art at the High-level Thematic Debate: Moment for Nature by the President of the United Nations General Assembly.

ART 2030 facilitates art projects connected to the UN Global Goals, including critically acclaimed public exhibitions, special events, art experiences, and educational activities.

ART 2030 also presents The Hope Forum, which brings representatives from United Nations and UNESCO together with leaders from science and art at the Venice Art Biennale to accelerate system-wide, concrete action for sustainability. The 2024 iteration included opening remarks from H.E. Mr. António Guterres, UN Secretary-General (pre-recorded), and Dr. Prof. Johan Rockström. During The Hope Forum 2024, it was announced that the Art Charter for Climate Action (ACCA) — initiated and incubated by ART 2030 in collaboration with Julie’s Bicycle, Gallery Climate Coalition, and others, would be officially partnering with the United Nations Framework Convention on Climate Change (UNFCCC). In 2025, ACCA became officially hosted by UNFCCC through its Entertainment and Culture for Climate Action (ECCA) alliance. This marked a significant acknowledgment of the crucial role visual arts play in shaping a sustainable future.

In 2025, ART 2030 presented the public art exhibition What If? by acclaimed artist and environmental advocate Maya Lin and the What Is Missing? Foundation at the United Nations Headquarters and on JCDecaux-owned bus shelters across New York City during Climate Week. Blending art, science, policy, and storytelling, What If? raises awareness and inspires action on the interconnected issues of climate, nature, health, and hope, through bold questions and actionable solutions.

In 2024, ART 2030 launched Future Ours, an art project about the future of our planet. Twenty-one artists and collectives from around the world were invited to respond to the UN Summit of the Future and reimagine how we can safeguard our common planet. The works were presented inside the United Nations Headquarters and across the streets of New York City. Future Ours was made in collaboration with Kunsthal Charlottenborg and JCDecaux, with Hans Ulrich Obrist serving as co-curator. In summer 2025, the project traveled to Denmark, where it was exhibited at Kunsthal Charlottenborg in Copenhagen and displayed in streets, train stations, and AFA Decaux bus stops nationwide.

In 2021, ART 2030 worked with Superflex on the project Interspecies Assembly, debuting in New York at the 76th UN General Assembly. In 2019 ART 2030 worked with artist Jeppe Hein on the project Breathe With Me, a public art action on display at UN Headquarters and in Central Park. In 2017, ART 2030 curated Ai Weiwei's installation Soleil Levant on the façade of the art institution Kunsthal Charlottenborg. With over 3,500 lifejackets collected from the shores of the Greek island of Lesbos barricading the outer wall of the exhibition gallery, the work renewed focus to the ongoing European migrant crisis, as well as issues surrounding the topics of equality and justice in mainstream and public discourse.

Luise Faurschou also owns and manages the art advisory agency Faurschou Art Resources. As an independent art dealer and curator, Luise Faurschou advises and develops projects for public and private museums and art collections worldwide. Among notable exhibitions she has curated is Human Nature - Doing, Undoing, and Redoing with works by Louise Bourgeois for Kistefos Museum and Sculpture Park in Norway. In 2019, she curated the exhibition Tomorrow is the Question with works by Alfredo Jaar, Allora & Calzadilla, Cao Fei, Doug Aitken, Hito Steyerl, Olafur Eliasson, Simon Denny and Tómas Saraceno among others for ARoS. Among other notable exhibitions and permanent installations are Jeppe Hein, Yoko Ono and Ai Weiwei at Chateau La Coste.

From 1986 to 2013, Luise Faurschou co-founded and managed Galleri Faurschou and Faurschou Foundation. Over the years, the gallery became a prominent dealer of the works of Edvard Munch and published in collaboration with the Munch Museum The Edvard Munch Catalogue Raisonné through Cappelen Damm and Thames and Hudson. The two galleries mounted a number of exhibitions, showing works by art history icons such as Pablo Picasso, Robert Rauschenberg, Louise Bourgeois, Andy Warhol, Ai Weiwei, Yoko Ono, Shirin Neshat, Gerhard Richter, Cai Guo-Qiang, Danh Vo, Bill Viola, Michael Kvium, Asger Jorn and Christian Lemmerz.

In 2013 Luise Faurschou went independent and founded Faurschou Art Resources. When the 2030 Agenda for Sustainable Development was adopted by all United Nations members in 2015, she founded the non-profit organisation ART 2030.
