= Jørgen Haugen Sørensen =

Danish sculptor (1934–2021)

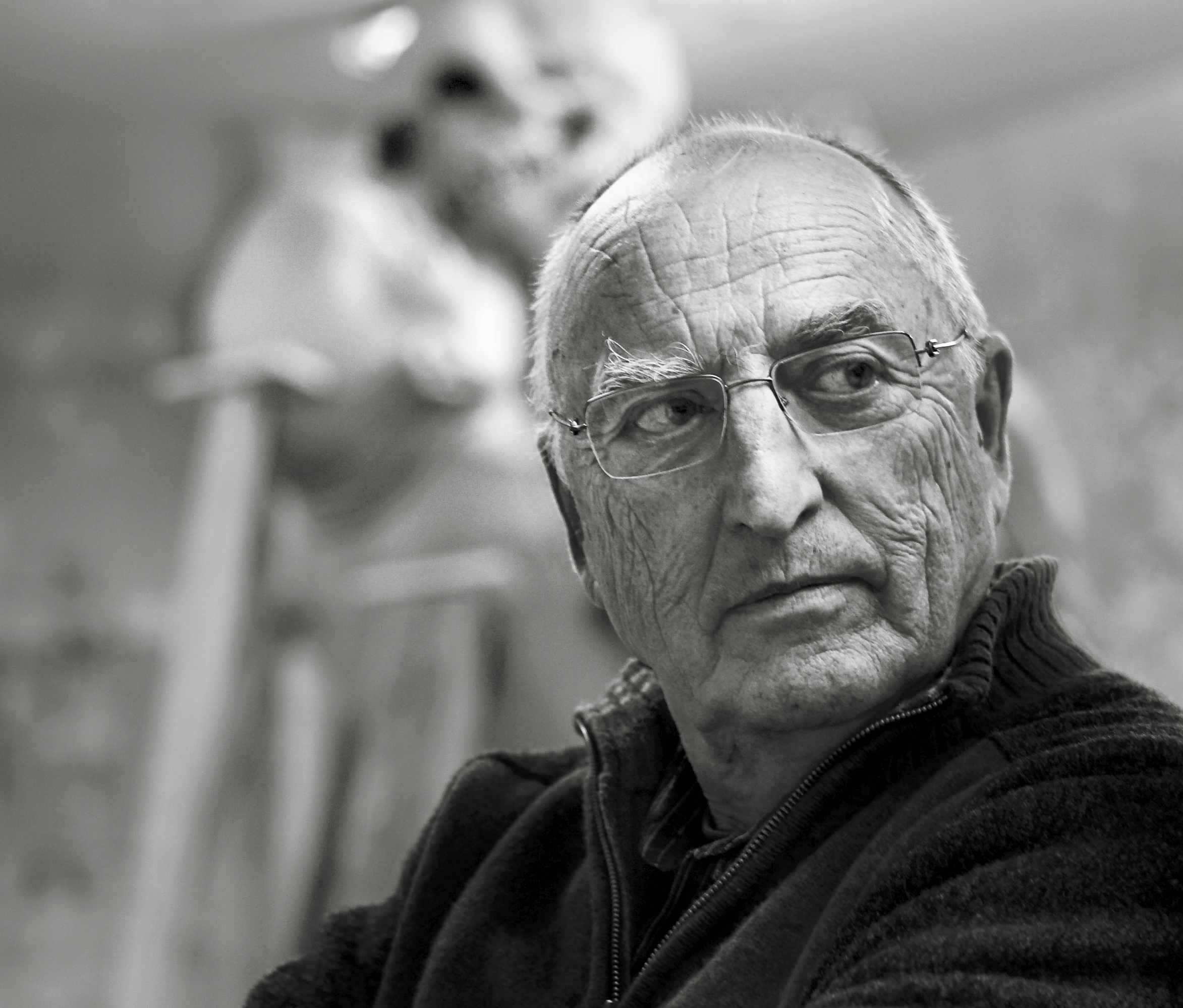
Jørgen Haugen Sørensen in 2007. Photo by Simon Lautrop

Jørgen Haugen Sørensen (Danish pronunciation: [ˈjɶɐ̯ˀn̩ ˈhɑwkn̩ ˈsɶɐ̯ˀn̩sn̩]; 3 October 1934 – 18 November 2021) was one of Denmark's most eminent sculptors. He had his artistic debut at the acclaimed and prestigious Spring Exhibition (Forårsudstillingen) at Kunsthal Charlottenborg, Copenhagen in 1953. Haugen Sørensen was a member of the artistic union Decembristerne and the artist collective Grønningen, as well as Veksølund in Denmark.

The post-war and contemporary sculptor has been hailed as the greatest Danish sculptor since Bertel Thorvaldsen. He received several important distinctions for his works through the years, such as the Eckerberg Medal in 1969 and the Thorvaldsen Medal in 1979. In 1958 he was selected to represent Denmark at the Biennale di Venezia. Sørensen's sculptures have been placed all around the world.

== Early life ==
As a child, together with his brother Arne, Haugen Sørensen began to draw and later to model. When he was 15, he trained as a plasterer and potter and then attended the Design School in Copenhagen. As a sculptor, however, he was self-taught.

Jørgen Haugen Sørensen has spent most of his life abroad, living in a voluntary exile in Southern Europe. The 1960s he spent in Paris, France and Verona, Italy before finally settling down in the artists' town Pietrasanta in Tuscany from 1971. Despite developing a style far removed from his Danish contemporaries, Haugen Sørensen has always been highly present in his native country in exhibitions as well as in the artistic debate.

== Career ==
After his debut at Charlottenborg's spring exhibition in 1953, he rapidly gained a reputation as a sculptor who crafted works of the human body and of animals with intense expressiveness and realism. His scenes of butchery became central to his work.

At the end of the 1950s during a stay on the island of Bornholm, he entered a more abstract phase, experimenting with tiled pipes and other ceramic products, although he maintained elements of the body and other recognizable phenomena. During the dramatic years of the Algerian War, he settled in Paris creating figurative sculptures in bronze from 1959 to 1963. They depict scarred, torn organic forms reflecting a reality of cruelty, fear and sexuality. He traveled widely to Italy, Germany, Spain and Yugoslavia, developing a style which was far removed from Danish culture. At the end of the 1960s, he often created compositions made up of several smaller sculptures, sometimes using materials such as plastic or textiles, occasionally borrowing elements from other sculptors.

After an interruption at the end of the 1960s when he turned to films, he returned to sculpture making use of marble, often combining different colours and finishes, as can be seen in his decorative work outside the School of Journalism in Aarhus. Other important works include the geometrical Huset der slikker solskin (The House which Licks Sunshine, 1980) for the Danish Institute in Rome, Dumhedens store flod (Stupidity's Great River, 1995) in Ribe, and Sorg (Sorrow, 1990) for the French University in Istanbul. His later work often consists of large angular shapes with rough surfaces as his three sculptures for the University of Lund (1994) and his 7 meters tall Colossus at the Amager Beach Park in Copenhagen.

Throughout his career Haugen Sørensen had been rethinking how to work with sculpture, and according to him art is important precisely because it is the means through which society breathes. His oeuvre can thus largely be viewed as a commentary on basic conditions of human existence.

== Style ==
Since his debut in 1953 he shifted without any formal training or schooling between materials and modes of expression within the sculptural sphere. His artistic language evolved throughout his career, but the production always kept an abstract core within its diversity. He primarily worked with sculptures even though he was also an accomplished draughtsman.

Haugen Sørensen's works present his views of the human condition in his own, often brutal style. His reservations about the Academy's approach are evident in his oeuvre's glaring contrast to the generally theoretical approach of his contemporaries. Free of attachment to any given idiom, Haugen Sørensen channelled his creative talents to depicting his own outlook on life, capturing the basic themes of life and death, love and suffering as the focal points of his sculpture, whether working with clay, plaster, fabric, terracotta, bronze, marble or granite.

Jørgen Haugen Sørensen's inspiration stemmed from myriad places. From Francis Goya's depictions of the Spanish peoples suffering during the Franco rule to Pablo Picasso's anti-war oil painting Guernica from 1937 and his own memories of childhood visits in the slaughterhouses in the Copenhagen Meat Packing District and readings of Kurt Vonnegut's novel Slaughterhouse Five from 1969. Haugen Sørensen studied Gian Lorenzo Bernini's craftsmanship and marble sculptures, the Mediterranean crafts traditions and he also took away ideas from his meeting with the abstract expressionist art movement in Paris and CoBrA in the 1950s.

== Selected public works ==
- 2017 The Crowd, bronze, Pietrasanta, Italy
- 2013 Justitio and the Witnesses, travertine, Copenhagen Court House, Denmark
- 2011 An Experience Less; Crowding at the Door of Stupidity; That's Why They Call them Dogs; Chaos; The Totalitarian, five relieves in white glazed ceramic, Copenhagen Court House, Denmark
- 2005 That’s Why We Call Them Dogs, ceramic, Danish National Museum
- 2001 The Alentejo Stone, granite, Castelo de Vide, Portogallo
- 1993 The House That Rains, granite, Skt. Hans Torv in Copenhagen
- 1992 TaşAnkara, granite, in Çankaya, Ankara
- 1988 Industrial Erection, granite, the Olympic Park in Seoul, South Korea
- 1983 The Angular One and the Smooth Ones Slide, granite, Assistants’ Cemetery Copenhagen

The task of decorating the City Court in Copenhagen was originally assigned to classical sculptor Bertel Thorvaldsen 200 years ago, but it was never completed.

== Selected solo exhibitions ==
A selection of Haugen Sørensen's exhibitions includes:

- 2019 Time Meets Time J. F. Willumsens Museum
- 2017 The Crowd Piazza del Duomo Pietrasanta
- 2014 Justitio og vidnerne, Thorvaldsens Museum, Copenhagen, Denmark
- 2011 Jørgen Haugen Sørensen in Cisternerne, Cisternerne, Copenhagen, Denmark
- 2011 In dialogue with Norbert Tadeusz Bornholm Art Museum, Denmark
- 2007 While we wait Statens Museum for Kunst Copenhagen, Denmark
- 2004 That’s why they call them dogs Felleshuset der Nordischen Botschaften, Berlin, Germany
- 2002 Jørgen Haugen Sørensen Vigeland Museet, Oslo, Norway
- 2000 Jeg Mener, jeg Ser Retrospektiv, KunstCentret Silkeborg Bad, Silkeborg og Sophienholm
- 1999 Jeg mener, jeg ser Ny Carlsberg Glyptotek
- 1993 Retrospektiv Yorkshire Sculpture Park, England,
- 1993 Silent Witness Museo de Arte Moderno, Mexico City; Museo de Arte Contemporáneo de Oaxaca; Museo de Xalapa, Mexico.
- 1992 Retrospektiv Charlottenborg with Carl Henning Petersen Kunsthal Charlottenborg Copenhagen, Denmark
- 1991 The Cyplos with Christian Lemmerz, Ny Carlsberg Glyptotek, Copenhagen, Denmark
- 1983 San José Museum of Art California, US
- 1982 Charles Cowles Gallery New York, US
- 1980 Jørgen Haugen Sørensen at Ny Carlsberg Glyptoteket, Copenhagen Denmark
- 1976 Jørgen Haugen Sørensen, Sonja Henies og Niels Onstads Stiftelser, Høvikodden, Norway
- 1975 Louisiana Museum of Modern Art, m. Giovanni Meloni, Humlebæk, Denmark
- 1964 Fire Billedhuggere Louisiana Museum of Modern Art, Humlebæk, Denmark
- 1963 Untitled Galerie Ariel, Paris, France
- 1961 Galleria del Naviglio, Milan, Italy
- 1960 Galerie Børge Birch, Copenhagen, Denmark

== Selected group exhibitions ==
- 2020 Grønningen Den Frie Udstillingsbygning, Copenhagen, DK
- 1980 XI International Sculpture Conference Washington DC, US
- 1979 15 Biennale Middelheim Sculpture Park, Antwerp, Belgium
- 1966 Jeune Sculpture Musée Rodin, 1966, 1969, Paris, France
- 1961 The Pittsburgh International Exhibition of Contemporary Painting and Sculpture Museum of Art, Carnegie Institute, Pittsburgh, Pennsylvania, US
- 1959 Youth Biennial, Paris 1959 and 1963, Wins the jury award in 1963 and 1965
- 1958 Biennale di Venezia, Italy

== Collections ==
Ny Carlsberg Glyptotek, National Gallery of Denmark, Louisiana, Museum of Modern Art, Carnegie Institute, Nasjonalgalleriet, Henie Onstad Kunstsenter MoMA Museum of Modern Art, Yorkshire Sculpture Park, Portofino Sculpture Park, Kunsten Museum of Modern Art Aalborg, HEART.

In 2014 Haugen Sørensen donated a significant part of his private collection to Bornholms Kunstmuseum.

== Awards and recognitions ==
- Represented Denmark at La Biennale di Venezia in 1958
- The Eckersberg Medal in 1969
- The Thorvaldsen Medal in 1979
- Statens Kunstfonds livsvarige hædersydelse in 1984.
- Premio Fratelli Rosselli in 2016

== Art market and fairs ==
Haugen Sørensen is represented by Copenhagen-based Hans Alf Gallery as well as by UK based Messums London and Wiltshire. He has exhibited his work at international art fairs such as Art Herning, Scope Basel and Scope New York.

== Bibliography ==
- Haugen Sørensen, Jørgen: Souvenir: Jørgen Haugen Sørensen, 1993, Copenhagen, Charlottenborg. ISBN 8788944263.
