= Esbjerg Art Museum =

Art museum in Esbjerg, Denmark

Coordinates: 55°27′52″N 8°27′02″E

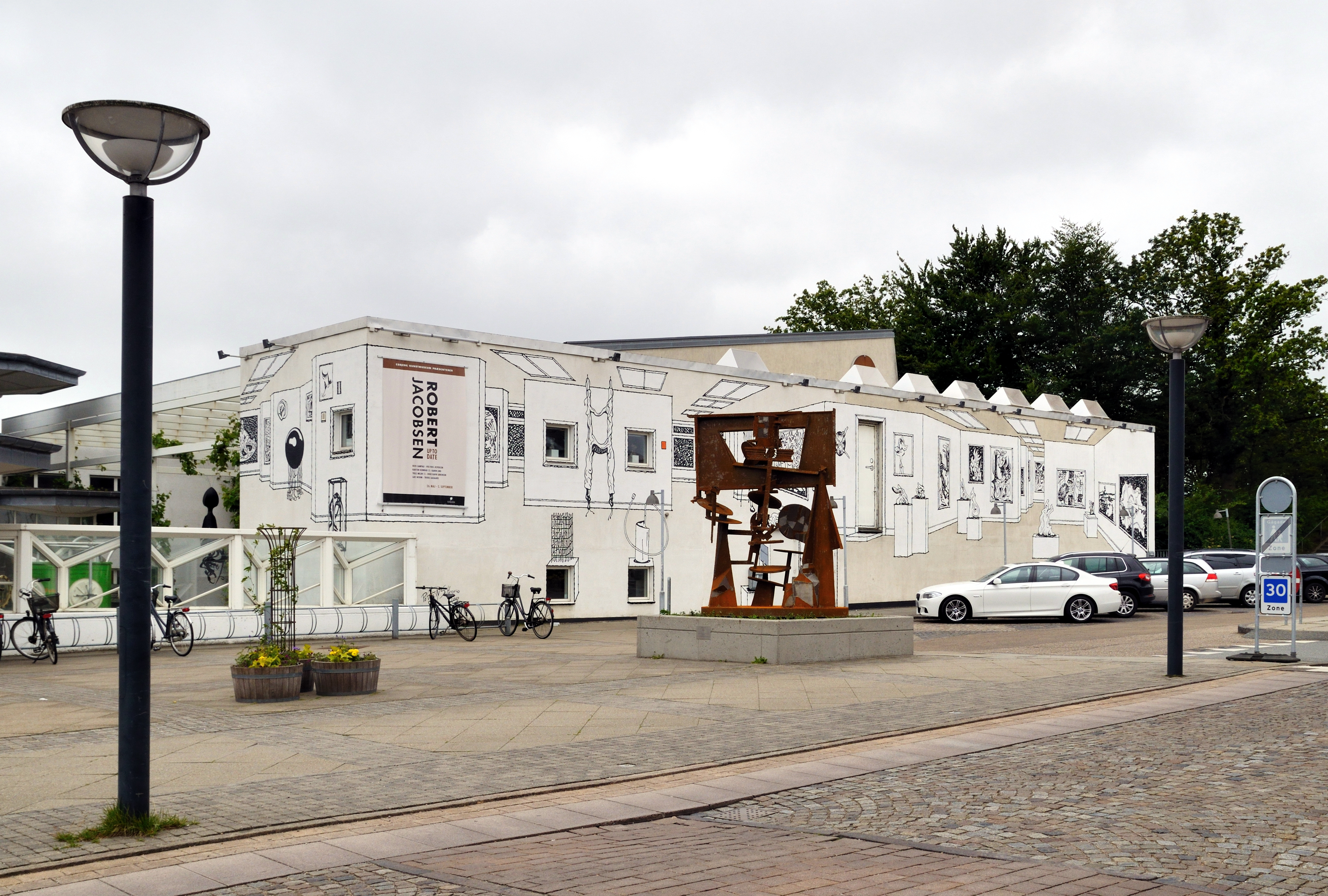
Esbjerg Art Museum

The Esbjerg Art Museum (Danish: Esbjerg Kunstmuseum) is an independently owned art museum in Esbjerg in southwest Jutland, Denmark. Founded in 1910, in 1962 it moved into a new building in the City Park designed by Jytte og Ove Tapdrup. Since 1997, the museum has formed part of a complex which also contains the Esbjerg Performing Arts Centre.

== History ==
Founded as Esbjerg Kunstforening (Esbjerg's Art Association) in 1910, the museum was first located in the public library (Esbjerg Bibliotek) in 1927. In 1930, it purchased works by modernists such as Harald Giersing, Edvard Weie and Vilhelm Lundstrøm. After moving into the new building in the City Park in 1962, the museum acquired concrete works by Richard Mortensen and Robert Jacobsen as well as works from artists participating in the Linien and Linien II associations.

== Architecture ==
Originally known as Kunstpavillonen (the Art Pavilion), the building in the City Park was designed by Jytte and Ove Tapdrup. Commanding an excellent position near the Water Tower overlooking the harbour, the complex consists of a low permanent art gallery wing to the north and a two-storey exhibition area to the south. After the music conservatory moved into new premises in 1974, the museum gained additional space for the municipal collection which was extended with many important new works. The complex adopts a simple, refined style which takes advantage of the sloping ground with floors at various levels and a number of balconies. The concrete structure has aluminium windows and spandrel panels decorated with pebbles. In 1997, it was connected to the newly completed Esbjerg Performing Arts Centre by means of an extensive foyer serving both institutions. In this connection, various extensions were made to the museum, latterly in 2005.

== Collection ==
The permanent collection covers Danish works from the beginning of the 20th century to the present day including foreign works by painters who have influenced Danish art. There is a focus on Realism and on Abstract art. In addition to works by Lundstrøm, the Linien artists, Richard Mortensen and Robert Jacobsen, there are paintings by Asger Jorn, Ejler Bille, Ernest Mancoba and other COBRA artists. The sculpture exhibition includes works by Jørgen Haugen Sørensen, Svend Wiig Hansen and Thomas Bang. Artists from the 1980s include Christian Lemmerz, Michael Kvium, Claus Carstensen and Peter Bonde while the 1990s are illustrated by works from Christian Skeel, Morten Skriver (Skeel & Skriver), Per Bak Jensen and Nina Saunders. A number of installations have been included since the beginning of the new millennium including two large displays by Olafur Eliasson.
