= TaşAnkara =

1992 sculpture by Jørgen Haugen Sørensen

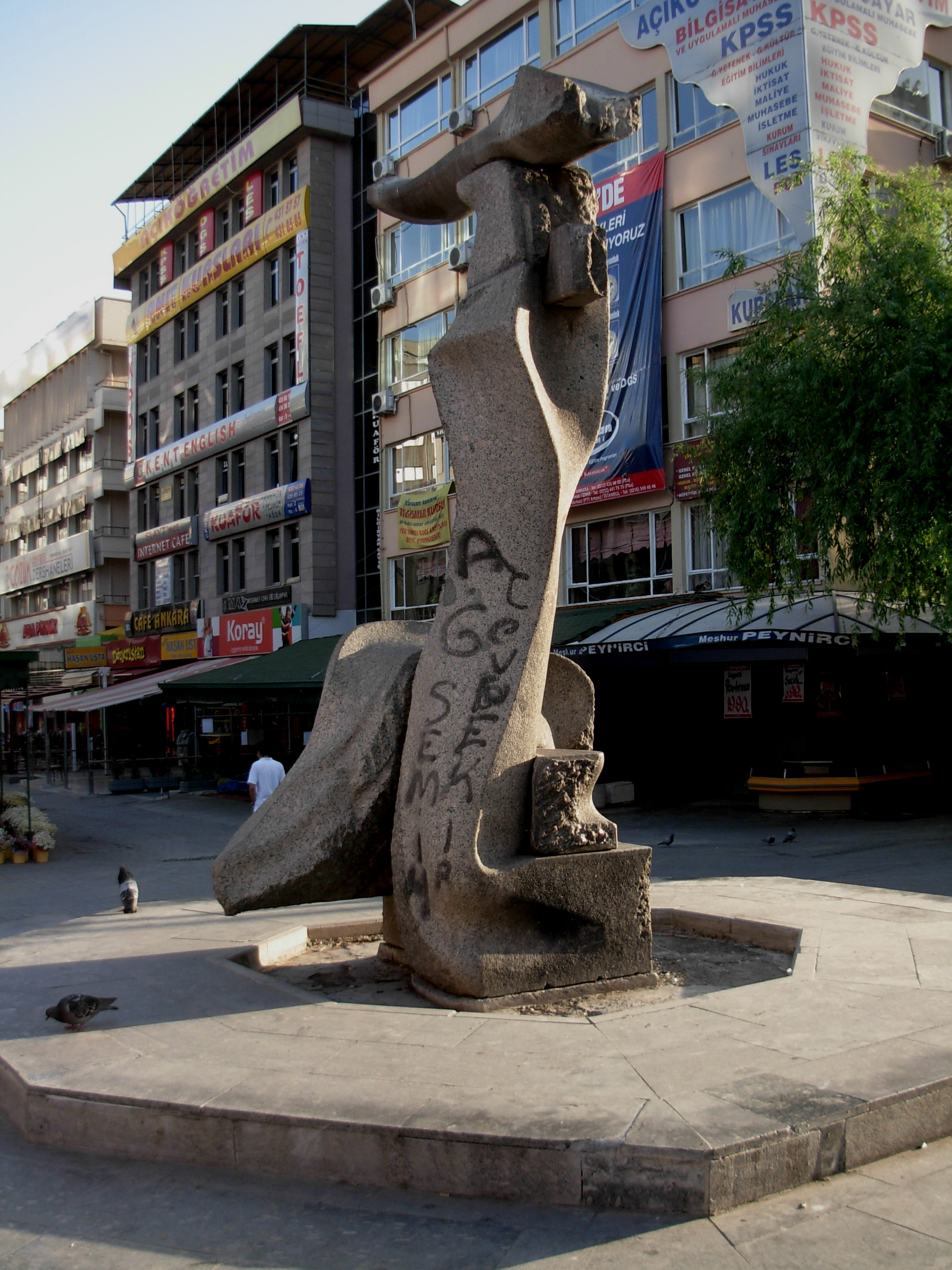
- Artist: Jørgen Haugen Sørensen
- Year: 1992
- Medium: Stone
- Subject: Abstract
- Dimensions: 130 cm × 195 cm × 410 cm (51 in × 77 in × 160 in)
- Condition: Completed
- Location: Çankaya, Ankara, Turkey
- 39°55′18.74″N 32°51′19.17″E
- Owner: Ankara Metropolitan Municipality

TaşAnkara (lit. 'StoneAnkara') is a sculpture located in Çankaya, Ankara. It was created by Danish sculptor Jørgen Haugen Sørensen and completed in 1992. As part of the city's public art, the sculpture was placed in Sakarya Street.

== History ==
Sculptor Jørgen Haugen Sørensen had visited Turkey to attend an exhibition in 1991. During the same period, there was a pedestrianisation project in a certain area of the city center and the Ankara Metropolitan Municipality was aiming to ornament public spheres with several artworks. In this scope, Sørensen received an invitation to attend an international workshop in which many artists from abroad were also convoked. By accepting the offer, he came to Ankara again and started his works. The work, completed in 1992 and named as "TaşAnkara" by the artist, was initially located at the intersection of Sakarya Street and Selanik Street, where pedestrian traffic was relatively dense. Because of the renovation works carried out around the street area in 2019, the sculpture was removed from there and placed on the side of the road facing Mithatpaşa Street.
