= Arne Haugen Sørensen =

Danish painter and illustrator (born 1932)

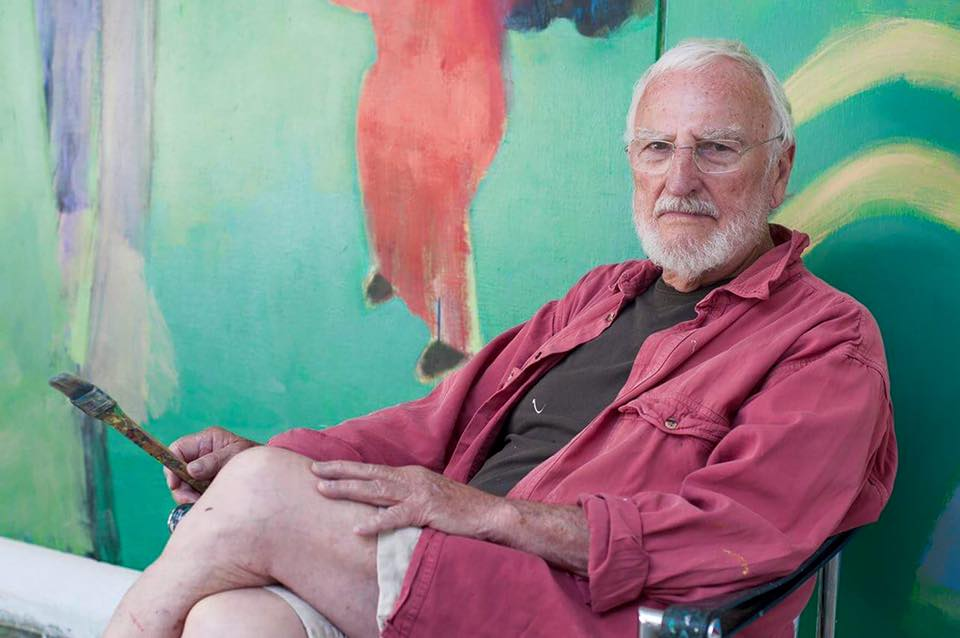
- Arne Haugen Sørensen
- Born: 27 April 1932 (age 94); Copenhagen, Denmark
- Style: Expressionism
- Title: Knight of the Order of the Danneborg
- Relatives: Jørgen Haugen Sørensen (brother)
- Awards: Eckersberg Medal (1975); Thorvaldsen Medal (1984)

Arne Haugen Sørensen (Danish pronunciation: [ˈɑːnə ˈhɑwkn̩ ˈsɶɐ̯ˀn̩sn̩]; born 27 April 1932) is a Danish painter and illustrator. Since the 1980s, he has become one of Denmark's most productive religious artists, decorating over 25 churches.

== Early life and training ==
Sørensen was born in Copenhagen. He has a younger brother, Jørgen Haugen Sørensen, who is also an artist.

Sørensen had little training in art apart from evening courses in drawing and, after he arrived in Paris in 1950, brief introductions to etching and lithography in the schools run by Stanley William Hayter and Johnny Friedlander.

== Career ==
In 1953, Sørensen had his debut exhibition at Kunsterners efterårsudstilling. Thereafter, he regularly exhibited at the Charlottenborg autumn exhibition and Grønningen from 1967. He also exhibited frequently in Paris, beginning with the 9e Salon de la Jeune Peinture in 1958.

A long stay in Mallorca in 1962-63 enhanced his painting, and he was inspired by bright light, colour and the underwater world he experienced as a diver. His work also benefited from his encounters with Asger Jorn, Echaurren Matta and Antonio Saura whom he met at the Clot et George workshop run by Peter Bramsen.

Sørensen's early works are abstract, but he introduced animals and human figures as his career progressed.

By the time he moved back to Denmark in 1967, Sørensen had developed his own style of Expressionist figurative painting in vivid colours, exploring themes of man's animal instincts and the absurdity of life.

In the 1970s, Sørensen began to use acrylics, often with several layers of paint, in works including Pastorale med indbyggede katastrofer (1975), Dyr og damer (1979) and Frokost i det grønne (1979). Many of these works depict a predator pursuing a female victim, contrasting fear with aggression.

Since the 1980s, Sørensen has decorated more than 25 churches using a variety of mediums, including painting, frescos, stained glass, ceramics and sculpture. His subjects include the Binding of Isaac, the Last Supper, the Crucifixion, the Resurrection and the Supper at Emmaus.

Now in his 90s, Sørensen is still an active artist.

== Awards ==
In 1975, Haugen Sørensen was awarded the Eckersberg Medal and, in 1984, the Thorvaldsen Medal. Also in 1984, he was decorated a Knight of the Order of the Dannebrog.

== Personal life ==
Since 1981, Haugen Sørensen has lived with his wife, the ceramist Dorthe Krabbe, near Malaga in Spain.

== Literature ==
- Læssøe, Rolf; Sørensen, Arne Haugen; Skive kunstmuseum; Kastrupgårdsamlingen; Vejle kunstmuseum (2007). Arne Haugen Sørensen : Malerier 1962-2006. Thaning & Appel. ISBN 978-87-413-0006-1.
