= Søndermarken =

Park in Frederiksberg, Denmark

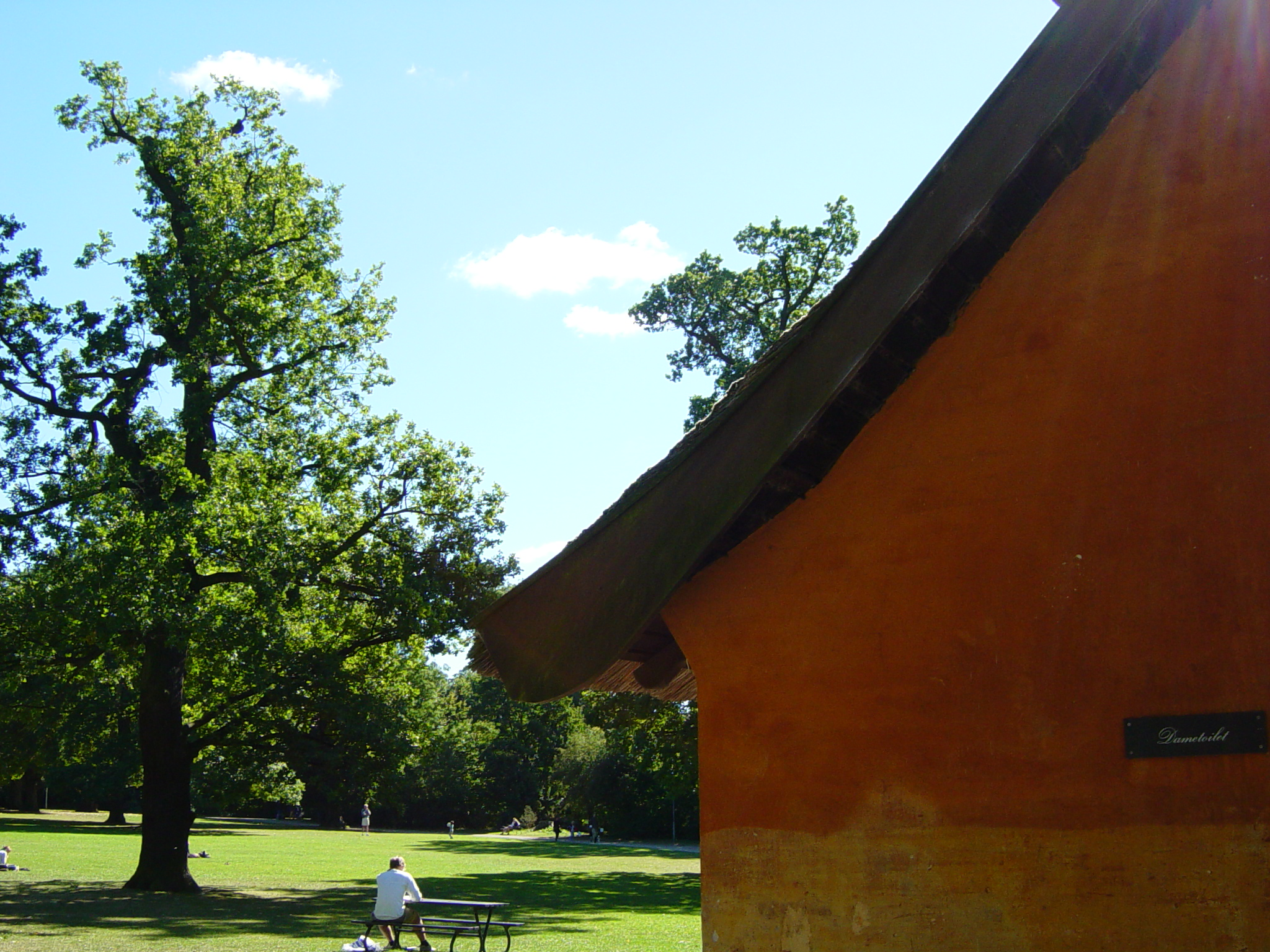
- Søndermarken
- Interactive map of Søndermarken
- Type: public park
- Location: Frederiksberg, Copenhagen
- Coordinates: 55.669°N 12.525°E
- Area: 32,3 hectares
- Created: 1699
- Operator: Danish Palaces and Properties Agency
- Status: Open all year

Søndermarken (lit. "The Southern Field") is a park in Frederiksberg on the border to Valby and the Carlsberg area in Copenhagen, Denmark. It shares much of its history with Frederiksberg Gardens from which it is separated only by Roskildevej. Cisternerne—an underground venue for art exhibitions in the former cisterns—are located inside the park.

== History ==
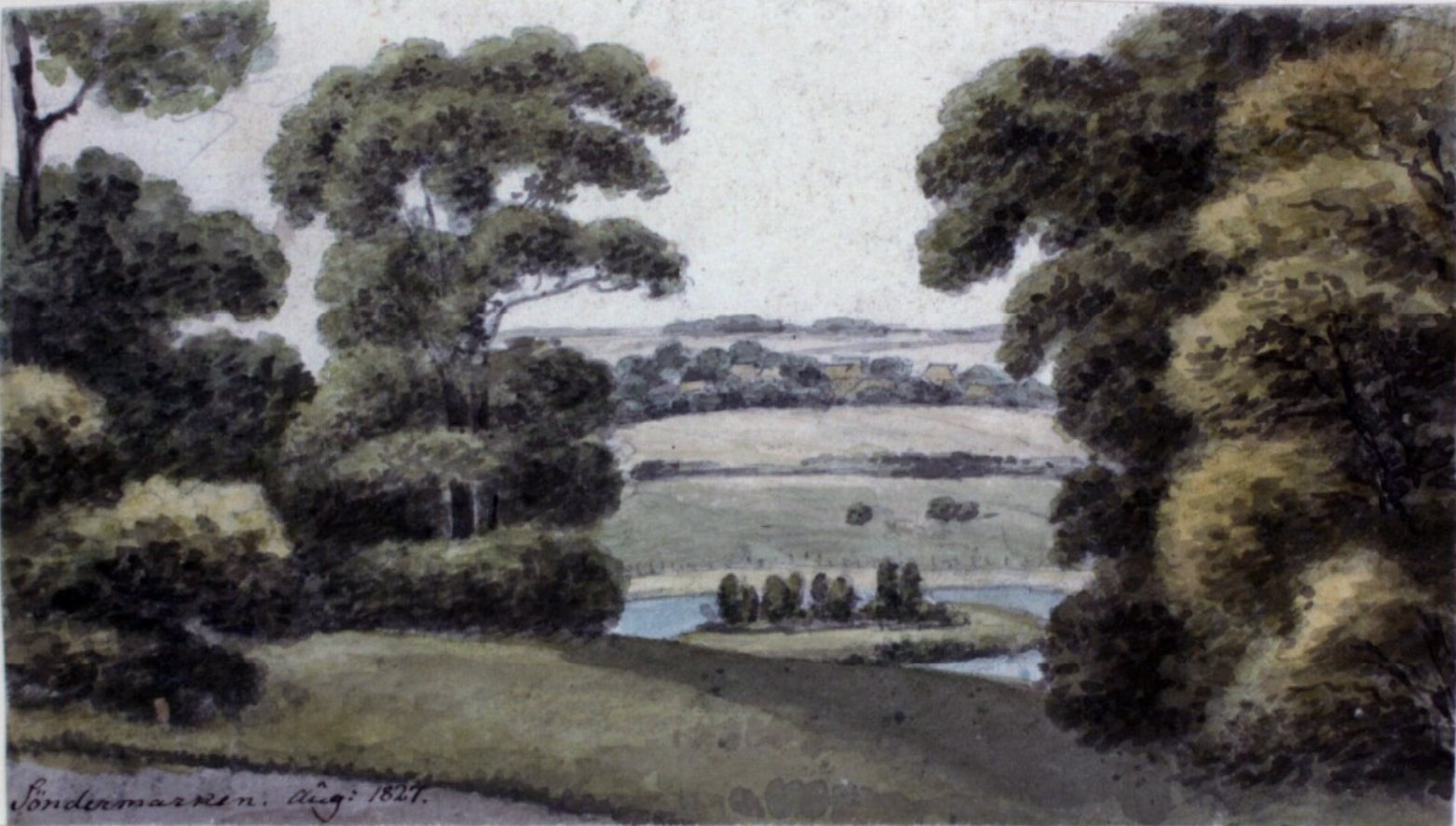
Ole Jørgen Rawert: Søndermarken, 1928

Søndermarken was founded and landscaped at the same time as Frederiksberg Gardens.

== Buildings and features ==
=== Cisternerne ===
Søndermarken features 3 underground cisterns which used to be part of Copenhagen's earliest water supply system. In 2001 they were converted into a museum for modern glass art, but since 2013 have been part of the Frederiksberg Museums, acting as a venue for art exhibitions, Cisternerne. The museum — located near Roskildevej, opposite the main entrance to the Copenhagen Zoo — is topped by 2 entrance pavilions and a fountain from 1890.

=== Memorial Mound ===
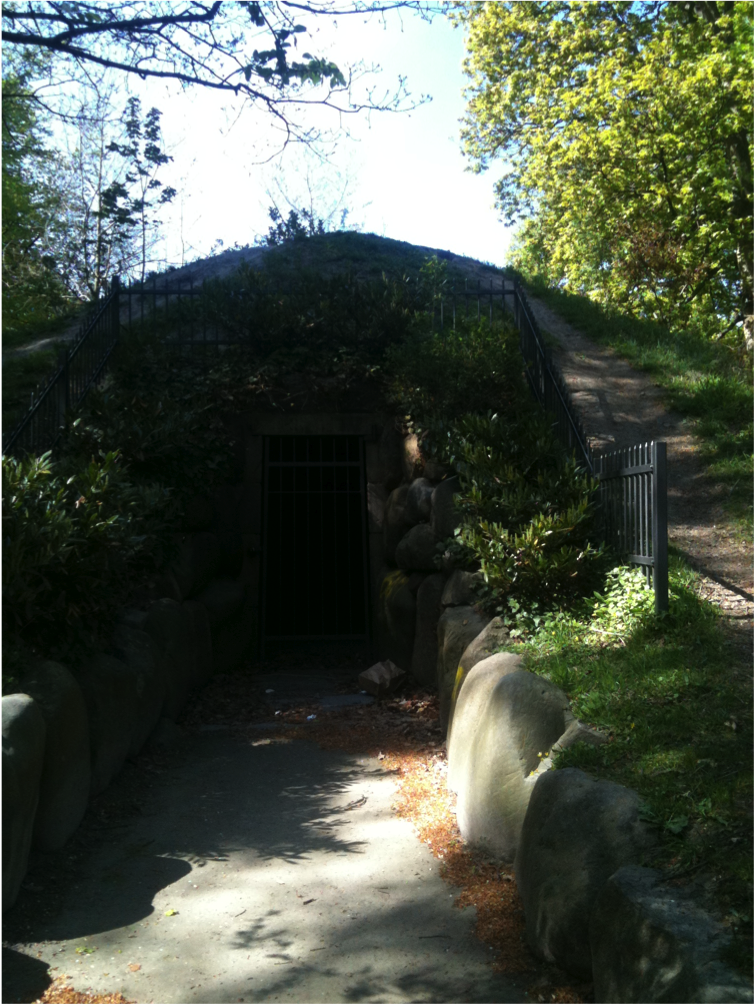
The entrance to the Memorial Mound

The Memorial Mound is on a slope and was erected in 1925 to commemorate Danish immigration to America. In the 1920s, Danish-Americans in the United States conceived the idea to erect a memorial in Copenhagen as a counterpoint to the traditions surrounding Rebild Hills celebrations in Jutland.

A committee of Danish-Americans was set up which charged the sculptor Anders Bundgaard with the commission. After prolonged discussions, it was ultimately decided that the monument should be a mound, with an embellished inner chamber, placed in Søndermarken.

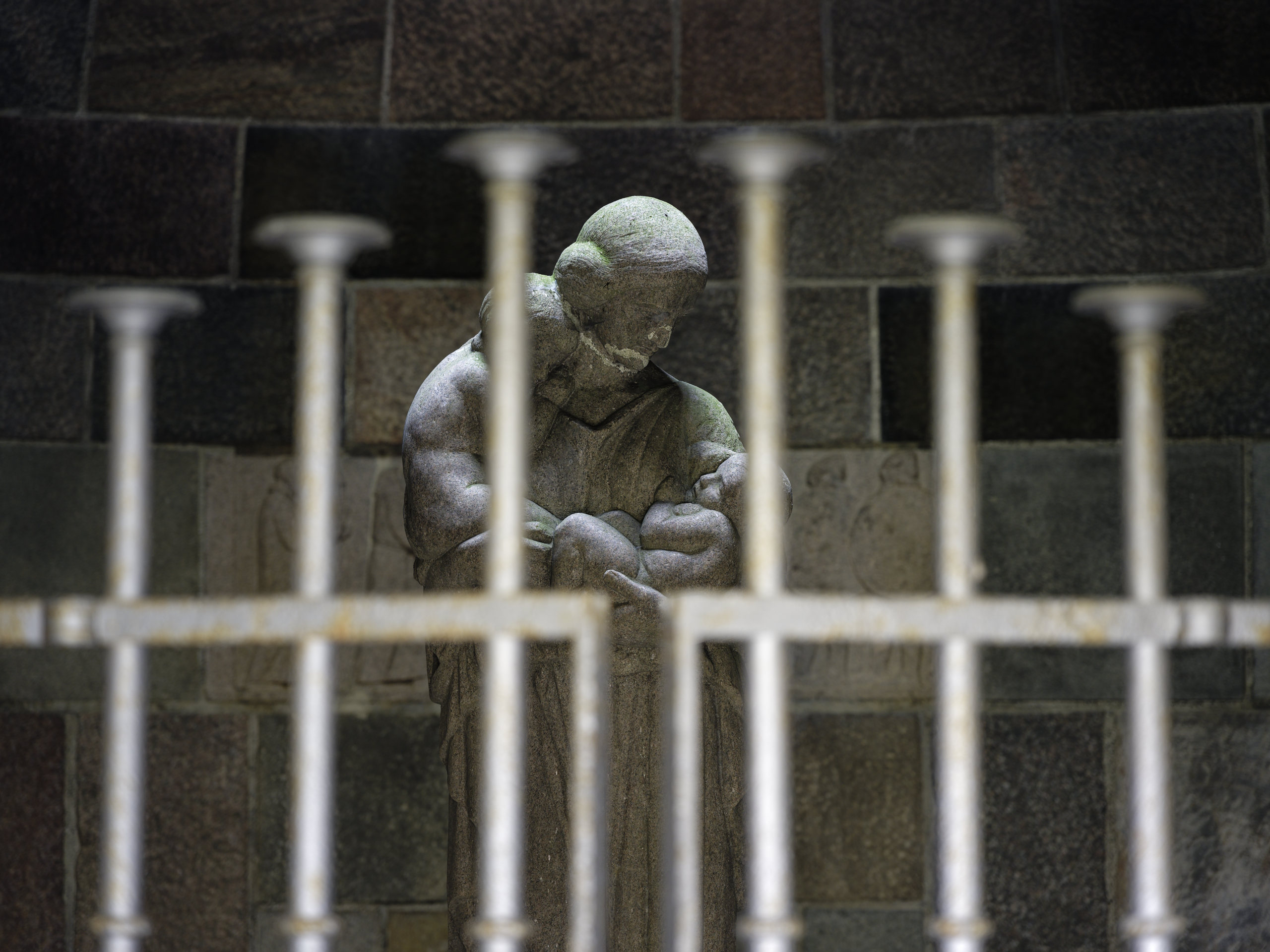
Sculpture found inside the memorial mound.

The necessary funds were raised through a worldwide collection among expatriate Danes. Around $12,000 was collected and the monument was inaugurated in 1925 with a ceremony attended by 40,000 people, including the entire Danish royal family.

The mound measures 8 metres in diameter and is 5 metres tall. It is surrounded by tall trees and is reached along a narrow stone-lined passageway. Chiselled above the entrance is the inscription: "They who set out, never to return." At the top of the cupola is a metre-wide opening to let in daylight. At the centre of the room is the life-size figure of a woman who embraces her children, symbolizing Mother Denmark. Built into the wall are 9 bas-reliefs with symbolic descriptions of the emigrants’ lives and activities abroad. In the floor is a five-pointed star representing the five continents.

The memorial mound is open to the public every year on 4 July.

== Statues ==
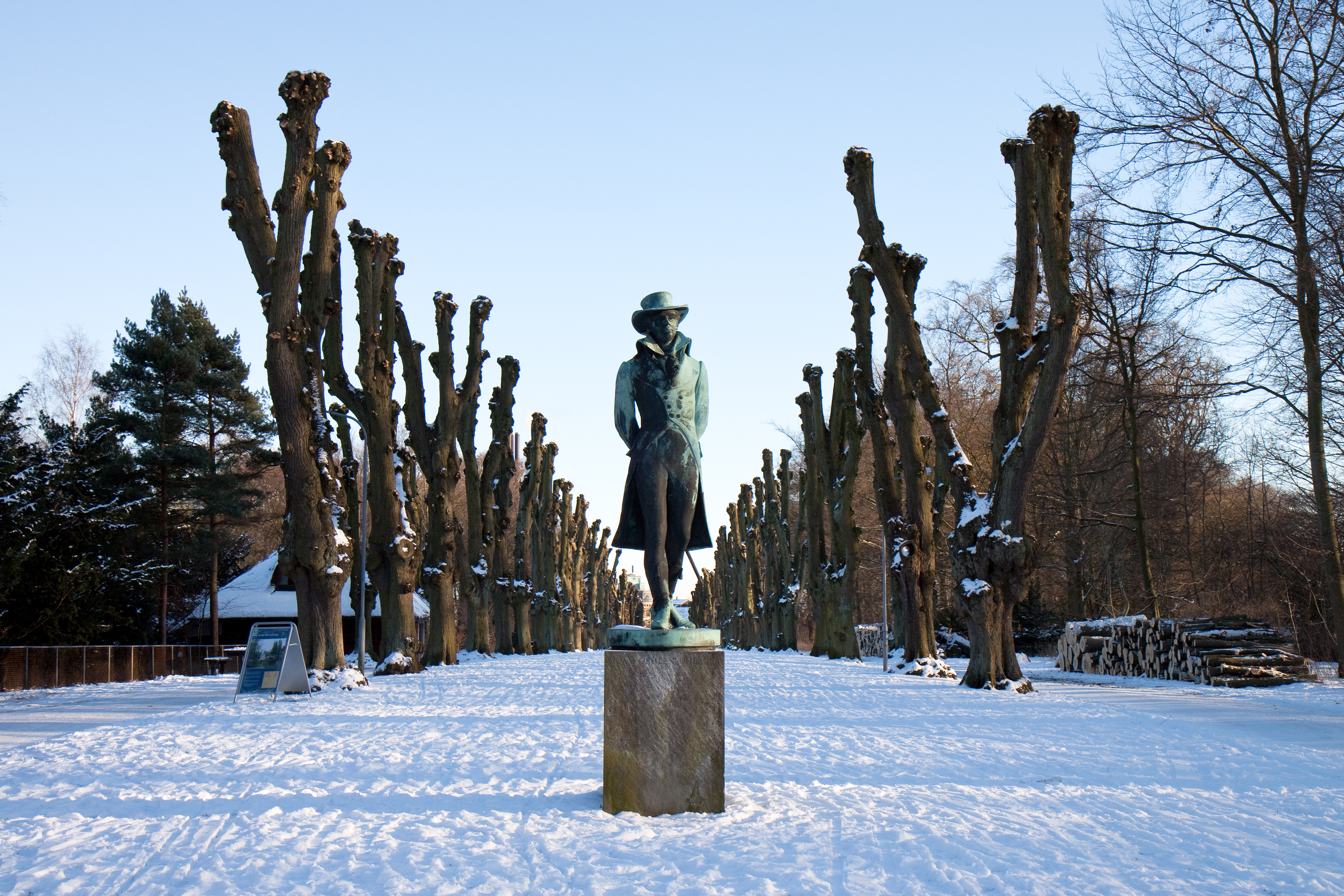
The Oehlenschläger statue on a winter's day

There is a statue in the central reservation at each end of Norske Allé. At the zoo end stands a statue of Adam Oehlenschläger, one of the central persons of the Danish Golden Age. It is designed by Julius Schultz and was originally located at the site of the current Frederiksberg Town Hall Square and inaugurated on 24 October 1897. When the new Town Hall was built, the statue was moved to its current location in Søndermarken and placed on a new plinth. It now faces Frederiksberg Palace where Oehlenschläger grew up.

At the other end of Norske Allé, near Carlsberg, stands a statue of the politician Carl Christian Hall, Danish prime minister from 1857 to 1859 and 1860 to 1863. It is designed by Vilhelm Bissen and was inaugurated on 15 September 1890.

== Vanguard Festival ==
Vanguard Festival is an annual music festival with music acts representing different genre but with an emphasis on hip hop, combining it with a family-friendly atmosphere and picnic baskets. Vanguard Late Night continues the festival in Vega when the programme ends in Søndermarken. The first festival took place on 2–4 August 2013, attracting some 9,000 people (day-tickets included). Music acts included Wu-Tang Clan, MF Doom and Sixto Rodriguez. The festival has signed a five-year contract with the Castles and Properties Agency on using the park.

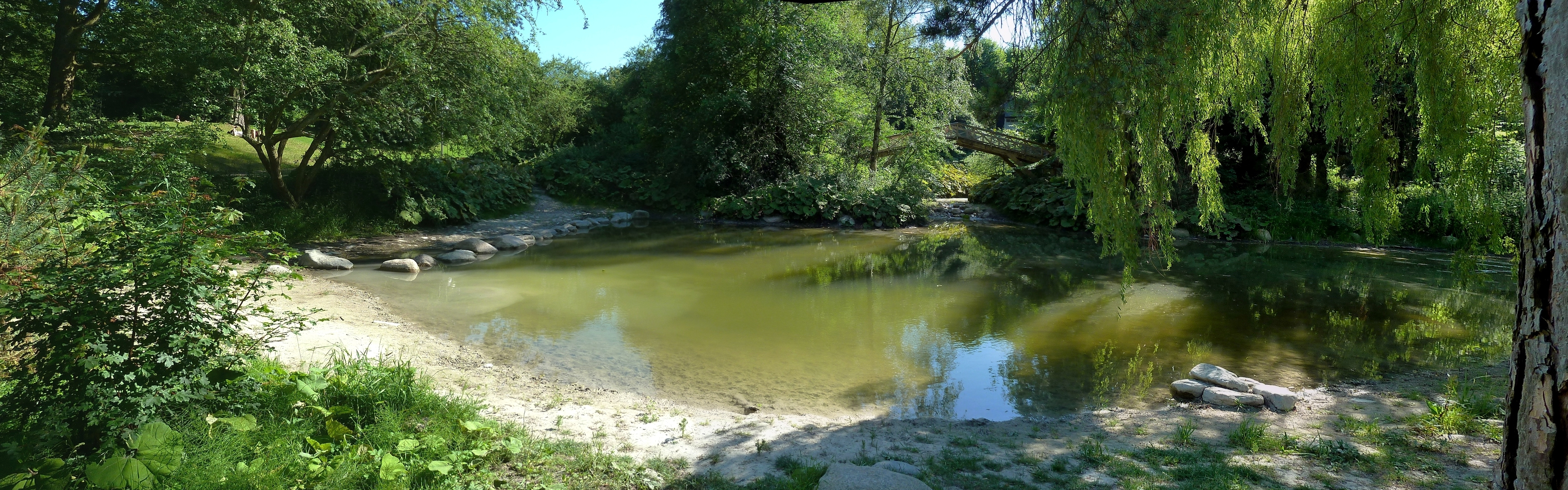
The lake and the Norwegian Bridge
