= Jenkin van Zyl =

British artist and filmmaker (born 1993)

- Born: 1993 (age 32–33)
- Education: Royal Academy of Arts (graduated 2021)
- Occupations: Artist, filmmaker
- Website: www.jenkinvanzyl.co.uk

Jenkin van Zyl (born 1993) is a British artist and filmmaker based in London. His practice centres on immersive installations that combine moving image and sculpture. His projects often use cyclical narrative structures to examine how communities form, and how systems of surveillance, spectacle and governance shape them. Van Zyl has been described in Art Monthly as “boldly reaffirming what has always been true: that art can be both deranged and intelligent, sensual and cerebral,” adding that he is “one of the foremost artists of his generation”.

== Selected work and exhibitions ==
Whilst studying at the Royal Academy Schools, in 2019 van Zyl was the youngest artist to be commissioned for the Hayward Gallery exhibition Kiss My Genders, where he presented the five-channel film and installation Looners, initiated through guerrilla filmmaking on dilapidated Hollywood film sets.

In 2023, he premiered Surrender, an installation and film centred on 1920s endurance dance marathons, first shown in solo shows at Edel Assanti and FACT Liverpool. Writing in Artforum, Gilda Williams described Surrender as the “Baroque’s mirror opposite: infinity as a hellish, materially loaded, claustrophobic drop into the dark bottomless depths of the human psyche, sexual desire, the internet” and as having “invented a wholly unprecedented, updated view of the infinite”.

In 2025, ARoS Aarhus Kunstmuseum commissioned van Zyl for its inaugural exhibition for its new Salling Gallery with a new film and installation, Lost Property.

In 2026, Film and Video Umbrella, Somerset House Studios and HOME, Manchester co-commissioned Enclosure, a new film and large-scale installation developed during van Zyl's residency at Somerset House Studios. The exhibition is scheduled to run in the Lancaster Rooms at Somerset House, London in September 2026. Set in a crumbling cryonics facility where tourists could once temporarily inhabit doubles of other people, known as Cherubs, the film follows Mercy, a former starlet who licensed her likeness to the programme and arrives to terminate her contract, and examines institutions and technologies that continue functioning after their original purpose has gone.
