= Christian Lemmerz =

German-Danish sculptor and visual artist (born 1959)

Christian Lemmerz (born January 30, 1959) is a German-Danish sculptor and visual artist who attended the Accademia di Belle Arti in Carrara, Italy, from 1978 to 1982 and the Royal Danish Academy of Fine Arts from 1983 to 1988. Despite classical sculpture training in Carrara, Lemmerz drew his main inspiration from the post-war process-oriented pop art, not least from his fellow countryman, Joseph Beuys.

In the early 1980s Lemmerz was part of the Danish artist collective Værkstedet Værst and the performance group Performancegruppen Værst. He conducted numerous performances there from 1985 to 1994, many of these alongside lifelong friend and artist Michael Kvium.

For his artistic achievements, Lemmerz was honoured with Thorvaldsen's Medal in 2009 and the Eckersberg Medal in 2008. In 2015 he received the New Carlsberg Foundation's Artist Grant.

== Career ==
The span of Lemmerz' oeuvre is extensive and pluralistic. Regardless of the material, the form or the medium employed, Lemmerz’ work can generally be characterized by aesthetics of effect. The artworks reach out into the surrounding environment and call for more than mere contemplation.

There are only a few themes and taboos that are not turned upside down in the Lemmerzian universe, which has been stretched between, on the one side, Kant, Heidegger and other philosophers and authors, and on the other, a mass-media-dominated world where suffering and death are central themes in an examination that circles around identity, existence and being.

In Lemmerz' view, to be effective art has to be confrontational. However, as he maintains, art also has to do with experience. And as a matter of fact, sculpture is particularly suitable for establishing a confrontational and experience-exchanging situation, especially when it is perceived from a phenomenological point of view. In such a situation, the sculpture is connected with the (human) body. Just as does the human body in phenomenology, the sculpture enters into relations where the senses interact in such a way that the work can be experienced as a visual and tactile challenge, in the cognitive sense. Instead of being a more or less distanced onlooker, the viewer becomes an active participant, who becomes entangled in new relations and is moved in some direction or other. The viewer's visual and tactile senses are alerted, thus engaging them as an active participant.

Lemmerz' approach can be seen as a rejection of the formal idiom in favour of experimentation with material aesthetics, often evoking illness, death or philosophy. Confrontation with the view is important in all the art forms he employs whether sculpture, installation or photography. In parallel, he has increasingly moved into performance, film and video.

Lemmerz has worked as a scenographer in Steven Berkoff's Brok (1994) and Rainer Werner Fassbinder's The Bitter Tears of Petra von Kant (1996). He is also the author and director of A.L.P. Traum, an interpretation of the end of James Joyce's Finnegans Wake (Edison 1997). This novel also inspired Lemmerz and Michael Kvium's The Wake (2000), an eight-hour silent movie, available in several versions. Lemmerz has resumed his work with marble and thus enters into a sculptural tradition that dates back to the Renaissance and Neoclassicism; examples of this include his Todesfigur (2012 Ny Carlsberg Glyptotek) and the Marble Altar in Lyngby Church (2013).

=== Style ===
On the basis of an urge to widen the artistic possibilities and a need to offer resistance to the prevailing conventions, Lemmerz makes use of stone wool, foam rubber, margarine, chocolate and other composite materials that effectively elicit an intensely direct effect. He yearns to create an imbalance on different levels. The artist formulates a couple of sculptural conceptions, "the impossible sculpture" and the "pre-linguistic sculpture", by means of which he links up his project with Heidegger's reflections on being and his rumination on the beginnings of everything – especially art – aiming at creating paths more than just artworks.

The artist works with white Carrara marble. He re-actualizes classical Greek art with the statue, Adam-Kadmon, and in the light of an art historical timeline that runs through classical, baroque, neo-classical and French salon art, he elaborates on the incessantly recurring themes of violence, terror and death while supplying this entire register of heavy and somber issues with erotic, absurdist and ironic twists.

Current political and ethical questions become endowed with a clearer voice through the works, which always, in terms of their form and content, constitute a transformation from recognizability to the more veiled or unknown, inasmuch as Lemmerz is working rhizomatically, where the assertion sometimes assumes a classically distinct form and sometimes manifests itself with a gestural formlessness. His whole pluralistic oeuvre is bound together, at the same time, by the fragment – as an open and processual figure.

=== Seminal works ===
For the exhibition Scene at Esbjerg Kunstmuseum in 1994, Lemmerz worked with blood-smeared surfaces and decomposing pigs' carcasses in glass-walled, steel-framed vitrines inspired by traditional still lifes where inanimate objects are often used as existential symbols. The exhibition actualized the universal theme of death and the transitory through sculptures that were contemporary in their form and presentation. The installation ensnared the audiences into a limbo of intrigue and disgust, making it close to impossible to look away. The audience might have wondered if the pigs were brutally killed for the exhibition or if they died a natural death, much like they would with the artwork Away from the Flock from 1994 by British artist Damien Hirst. The banality of the pigs and their known similarity to humans give the work its emotion. With Scene, Lemmerz worked within a psychological borderline area, where the very notion of sculpture had been distended to its most extreme implications.

== Selected solo exhibitions ==
- 2019 Uriel, Hans Alf Gallery
- 2019 EYESCAPE with Lars Top Galia at Copenhagen Contemporary
- 2018 Not I, Tang Contemporary Art in Hong Kong
- 2018 Reality Virtual Reality, Museum der bildenden Künste, Leipzig
- 2017 The Night is Large, Hans Alf Gallery
- 2017 Lust, Randers Kunstmuseum
- 2017 Virtual Reality, Faurschou Foundation, Beijing
- 2014 Andante, Cisternerne
- 2013 Angst, Gallery Brandstrup, Oslo
- 2012 Genfærd, ARoS
- 2010 Inferno, Stavanger Kunstmuseum
- 2010 Hypnosis, Faurschou Foundation, Beijing
- 2009 Largo, Statens Museum for Kunst
- 2007 The Omen, Leo Koenig Inc., New York
- 2001 The White of the Eye, Kunstforeningen Gammel Strand
- 1999 GODDOG, DCA Gallery New York
- 1997 Dopo La Storia II, MUHKA, Antwerp
- 1994 Scene, Esbjerg Kunstmuseum

== Selected group exhibitions ==
- 2019 The Red Bean Grows in the South, Faurschou Foundation, New York
- 2019 Family, Nordic Contemporary Paris
- 2018 Carl og Anne Marie C. Nielsens Legat, Den Frie Udstillingsbygning
- 2017 New Media Art (Virtual Reality), Faurschou Foundation, Venice
- 2017 CC: LAB Virtual Reality, Copenhagen Contemporary
- 2014 Portraits of God, Hans Alf Gallery
- 2014 Drømmeland, KUNSTEN Museum of Modern Art Aalborg
- 2013 Directors Choice 7-9-13, ARoS
- 2012 Dengang i 80erne, Horsens Kunstmuseum
- 2007 Sculpture: from Thorvaldsen to Lemmerz, Sorø Kunstmuseum
- 2004 Hvid marmor, Thorvaldsens Museum
- 2004 Clinch, Statens Museum for Kunst
- 2003 Decemberisterne, Den Frie Udstillingsbygning
- 2000 Mennesket, Arken Museum for Moderne Kunst
- 1997 The Louisiana exhibition 1997, Louisiana Museum of Modern Art Humlebæk
- 1997 Kropsnær, Heine Onstad Kunstsenter
- 1992 Spejlbilleder, Det Nationalhistoriske Museum, Frederiksborg
- 1988 Ateliers en liberte: 17 artistes danois, Foundation Cartier pour l'Art Contemporain, Paris

== Selected public works and commissions ==
- 2019 Ghost Ship, Copenhagen Light Festival
- 2017 Silence. Memorial for policemen killed on duty., Politigården, Copenhagen
- 2017 Lazarus, Bronze. Commission for Ny Carlsbergfondet at Bispebjerg Hospital
- 2017 Dark Rain, Bestseller, Aarhus
- 2013 Todesfigur, Ny Carlsberg Glyptotek, donated by architect Henning Larsen
- 2012–2013 Marble Altar, Lyngby Kirke
- 2011 Todesfigur, Nordfriedhof ("north cemetery") Düsseldorf, for Norbert Tadeusz (stolen in 2024)
- 2010–2013 Paradiso, Private Commission, Vejle
- 2006 Jailbird, Statsfængslet, Østjylland
- 1997 UR UR, Cinemateket Copenhagen

== Selected awards and recognitions ==
- 2008 Awarded Eckersberg Medal
- 2009 Awarded the Thorvaldsen Medal.
- 2010 Lifetime achievement award from Statens Kunstfond

== Collections ==
Statens Museum for Kunst, Nationalmuseet, ARoS Museum of Modern Art, SAXO Collection, Kunsten Museum of Modern Art Aalborg, HEART, Trapholt, Esbjerg Kunstmuseum, Horsens Kunstmuseum, Kanstrupgårdsamlingen, KØS Museum for Offentlig Kunst, The Saatchi Collection London, Stavanger Kunstmuseum.

== Art market and fair ==
Lemmerz is represented by Copenhagen-based Hans Alf Gallery, by Galleri Franz Pedersen in Horsens, Galleri Brandstrup in Oslo, Tang Contemporary Art in Hong Kong and Faurschou Foundation New York. He has exhibited his work at international art fairs such as ENTER Art Fair, Art Cologne and FIAC.

== Literature ==
- Sørensen, Ann Lumbye (2009). Memento - Christian Lemmerz: erindring, krop, død (in Danish). Information. ISBN 978-87-7514-238-5.
