= ARoS Aarhus Kunstmuseum =

Art museum in Aarhus, Denmark

Coordinates: 56°9′14.0″N 10°11′58.6″E

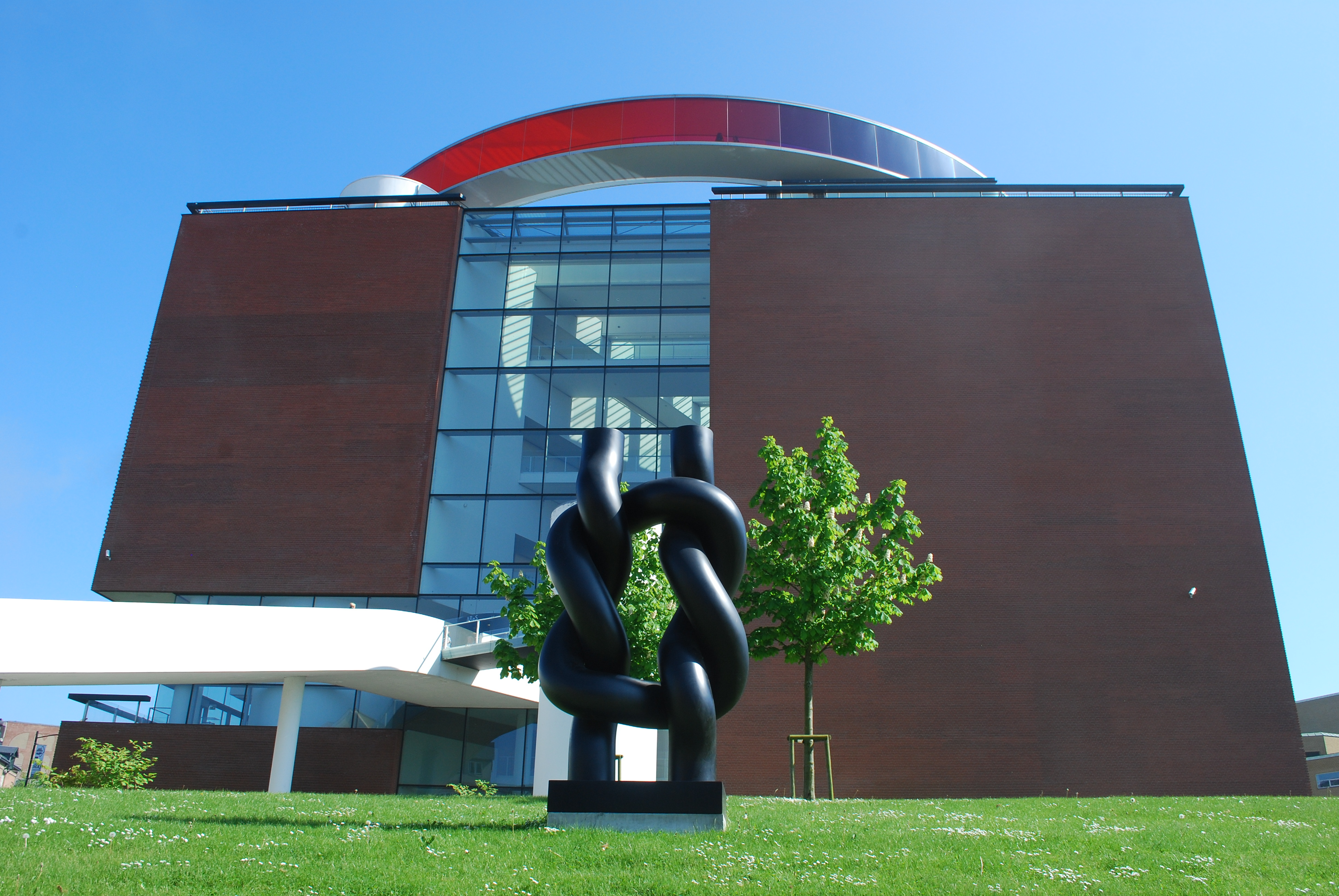
- Established: January 6, 1859; 167 years ago Present site opened on April 7, 2004; 22 years ago
- Visitors: 569.324 in 2015
- Public transit access: 816.468 in 2015
- Website: www.aros.dk

ARoS is an art museum in Aarhus, Denmark. The museum was established in 1859 and is the oldest public art museum in Denmark outside Copenhagen. On 7 April 2004, ARoS opened with exhibitions in a brand new modern building, 10 stories tall with a total floor area of 20,700 m² and designed by Danish architects Schmidt Hammer Lassen. Today, ARoS is one of the largest art museums in Northern Europe with a total of 624.000 visitors in 2023.

Apart from the large galleries with both permanent and changing exhibitions, the ARoS building features an arts shop, a dining café and a restaurant. The architectural vision of the museum was completed in 2011, with the addition of the circular skywalk Your rainbow panorama by Ólafur Elíasson. The installation has helped boost the museum's attendance, making it one of the most visited museums in Denmark.

== Exhibitions ==
ARoS has a large art collection with works from the Danish Golden Age until today, a changing selection of which are on display in the museum halls. Alongside, themed and changing exhibitions of both Danish and international artists are presented, with former events featuring renowned artists such as Ólafur Elíasson, Bjørn Nørgaard, Ingvar Cronhammar, architect Frank Gehry, Paul McCarthy, Robert Rauschenberg, Michael Kvium, Bill Viola, Franciska Clausen, Cindy Sherman and Sarah Sze. As many other modern art galleries and museums, ARoS also pays great tribute to architecture and architects, occasionally presenting exhibitions with architectural and spacious focuses.

Located in the basement is The 9 Spaces, a gallery with installation art from artists like James Turrell, Shirin Neshat, Bill Viola and Anri Sala. The number 9 refers to Dante Alighieri's The Divine Comedy and the 9 circles of hell. The rooms are painted black to contrast with the bright white exterior. The roof terrace substitutes for the divine light your enter from hell. This way the whole museum is part of the travel from hell to heaven. This movement emphasised by the grand spiral staircase in the main 'museum streetscape'. The roof of the museum is dominated by the installation Your rainbow panorama by Ólafur Elíasson. This circular skywalk has windows in the colors of the rainbow thereby showing the panorama of Aarhus in different colors depending on location of the viewer. The installation cost DKK million 60 ($10.7 million) to construct and was sponsored by the Realdania foundation. It was inaugurated on May 28, 2011. A second section, a glass lounge that guides visitors from the main museum building to Your rainbow panorama and houses another site-specific work opened in 2013.

== History ==
The museum was established in 1859 and is the oldest public art museum in Denmark outside Copenhagen. The art collecting activities were initiated some years earlier in 1847 by the local art association of "Århus Kunstforening af 1847" and the first public exhibition was presented on 6 January 1859 in Aarhus' old Town Hall, located at the Cathedral, now housing the museum KØN – Gender Museum Denmark.

On 6 January 2009, ARoS Aarhus Kunstmuseum celebrated its 150-year anniversary with a jubilee exhibition, displaying the same works as the very first exhibition in 1859, amongst others.

=== Future constructions ===
In the fall of 2014, ARoS announced plans for an expansion project titled "The Next Level". It includes the monumental art installation "As Seen Below – The Dome, a Skyspace by James Turrell", and a new underground gallery. The project has been postponed several times, but construction finally began in 2022. The Concert Hall Park surrounding the museum has also been redesigned and re-opened in 2025.

The 1,000 m² underground extension, known as the Salling Gallery, opened in June 2025, with its inaugural commission Lost Property, a video installation by British artist Jenkin van Zyl. This marked the first completed phase of The Next Level expansion. Turrell's Skyspace is now scheduled to open in June 2026.

=== Name ===
The name ARoS refers to the Old Danish name of the city Aarhus, Áros, while the capitalized letters of the name hint at the Latin word for art, namely ars.

== Attendance ==
In 2010, before Eliasson's piece opened, ARoS received 221,744 visitors. Two years later, more than 551,000 visitors came to the museum. In 2017, 980,909 visitors was noted. These figure includes visitors who in one way or another have redeemed ticket (658,086) and people who have visited ARoS Butik, ARoS Café or gone through the building.

== Gallery ==
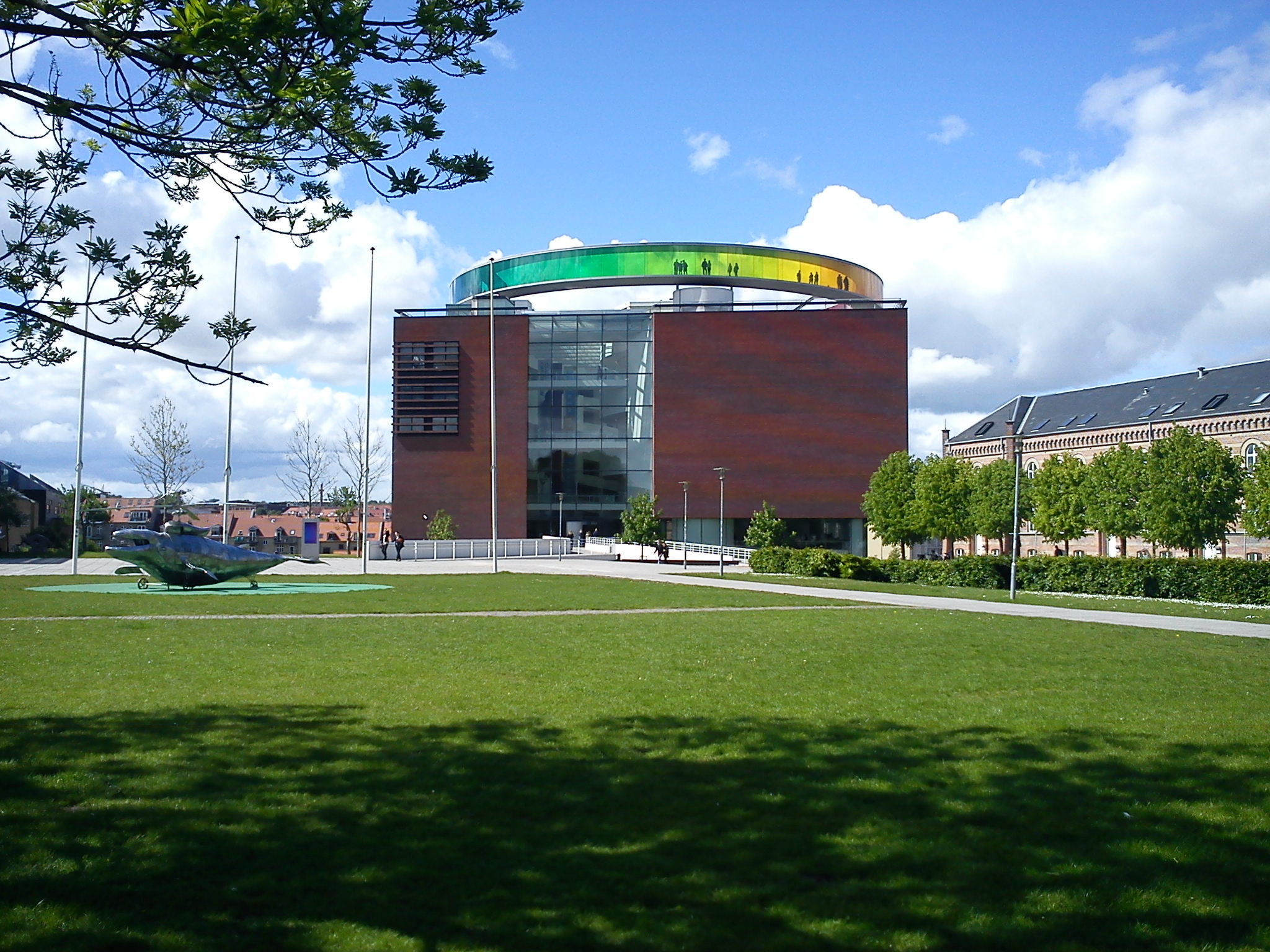
Entrance from the park at The Concert Halls

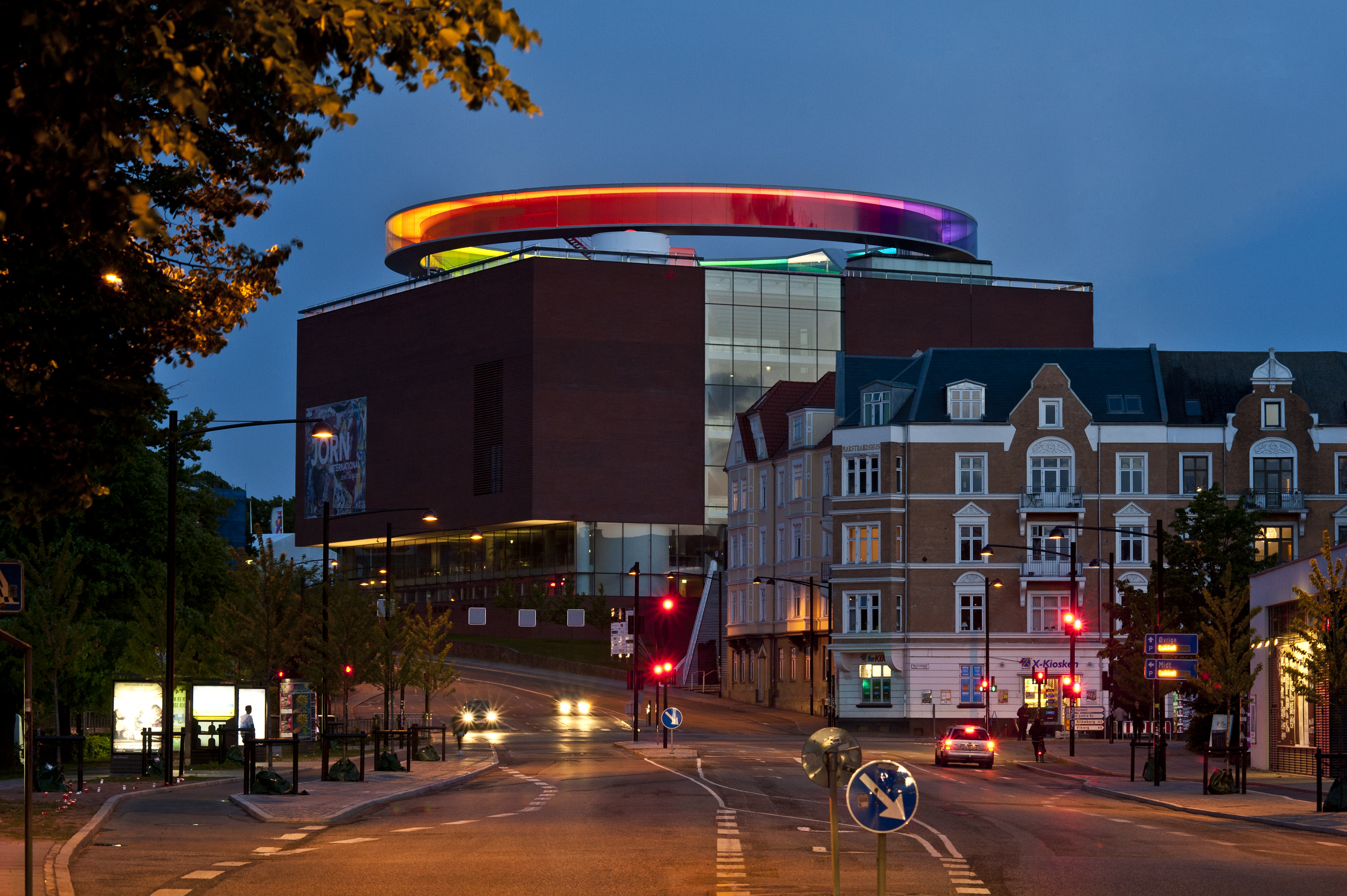
Nighttime view of the ARoS building

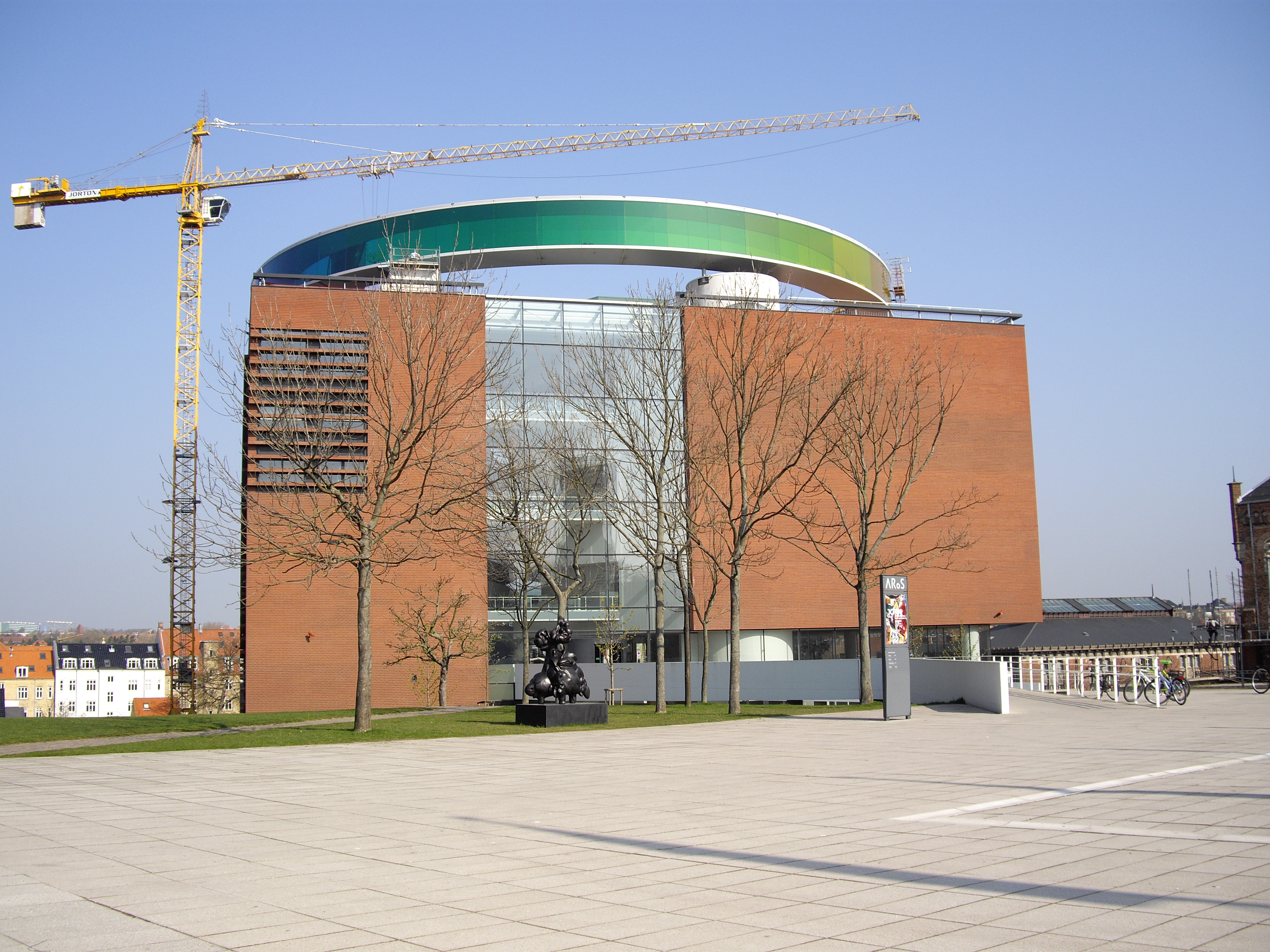
"Your Rainbow Panorama" under construction

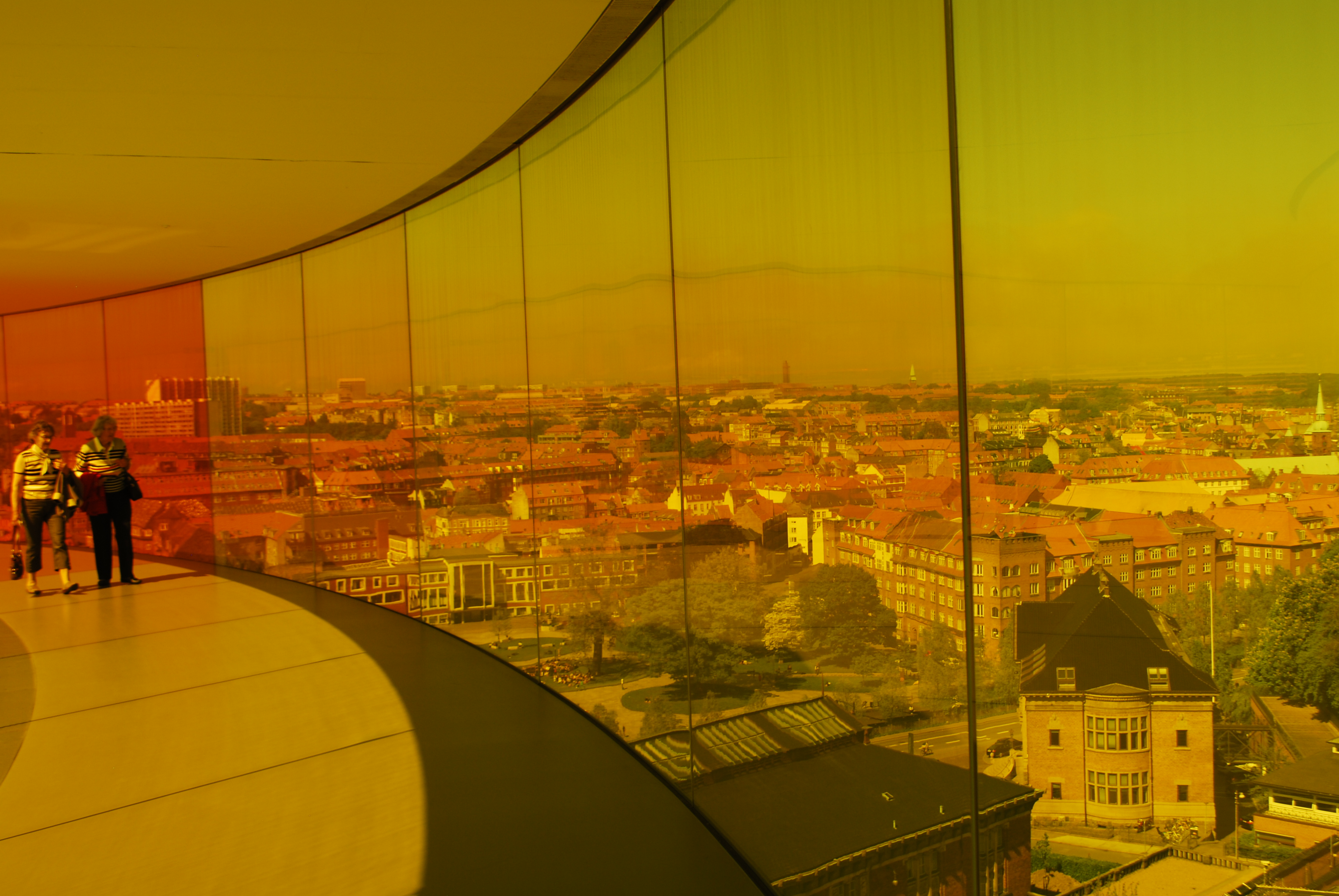
View from "Your Rainbow Panorama"

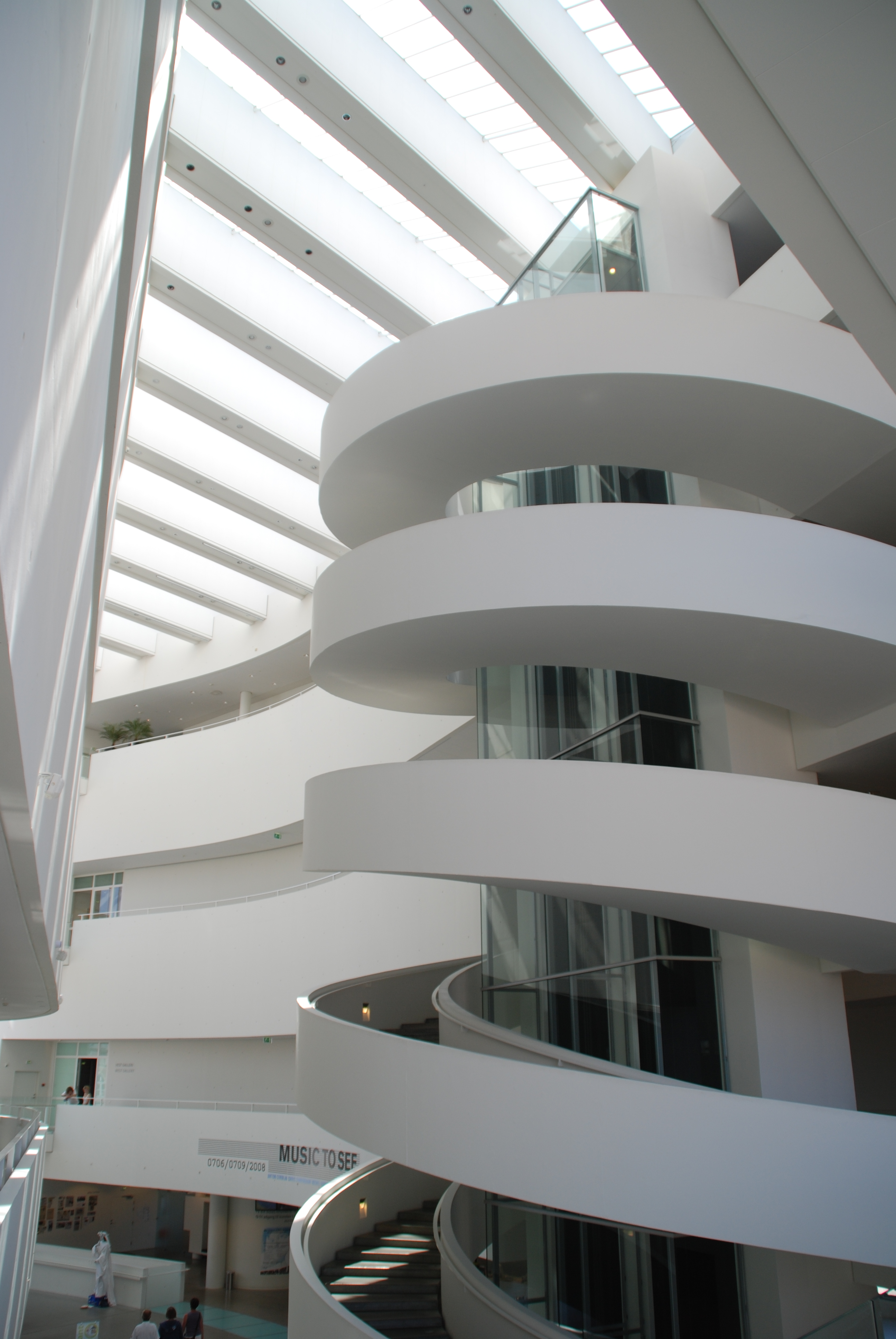
Inner staircase. The white smooth walls are typical of the building's interior.

== Sources ==
- Visit Aarhus describes AROS as Aarhus's main art museum
- Description of "Your rainbow panorama" by the Realdania foundation (in danish)
- description of "Your rainbow panorama" by designboom.com
