= Cisternerne =

Contemporary art space in Copenhagen, Denmark

Coordinates: 55°40′10.3″N 12°31′28.3″E

Cisternerne is an exhibition space for contemporary art in Copenhagen, Denmark with one annual site-specific total experience - and a wide range of events during the year. Cisternerne is an integral part of the Frederiksberg Museums (Frederiksbergmuseerne) where the singularity of its architecture and atmosphere remains a core attraction.

Located under Frederiksberg Hill in the heart of Søndermarken Park, Cisternerne is a cave underneath the city.

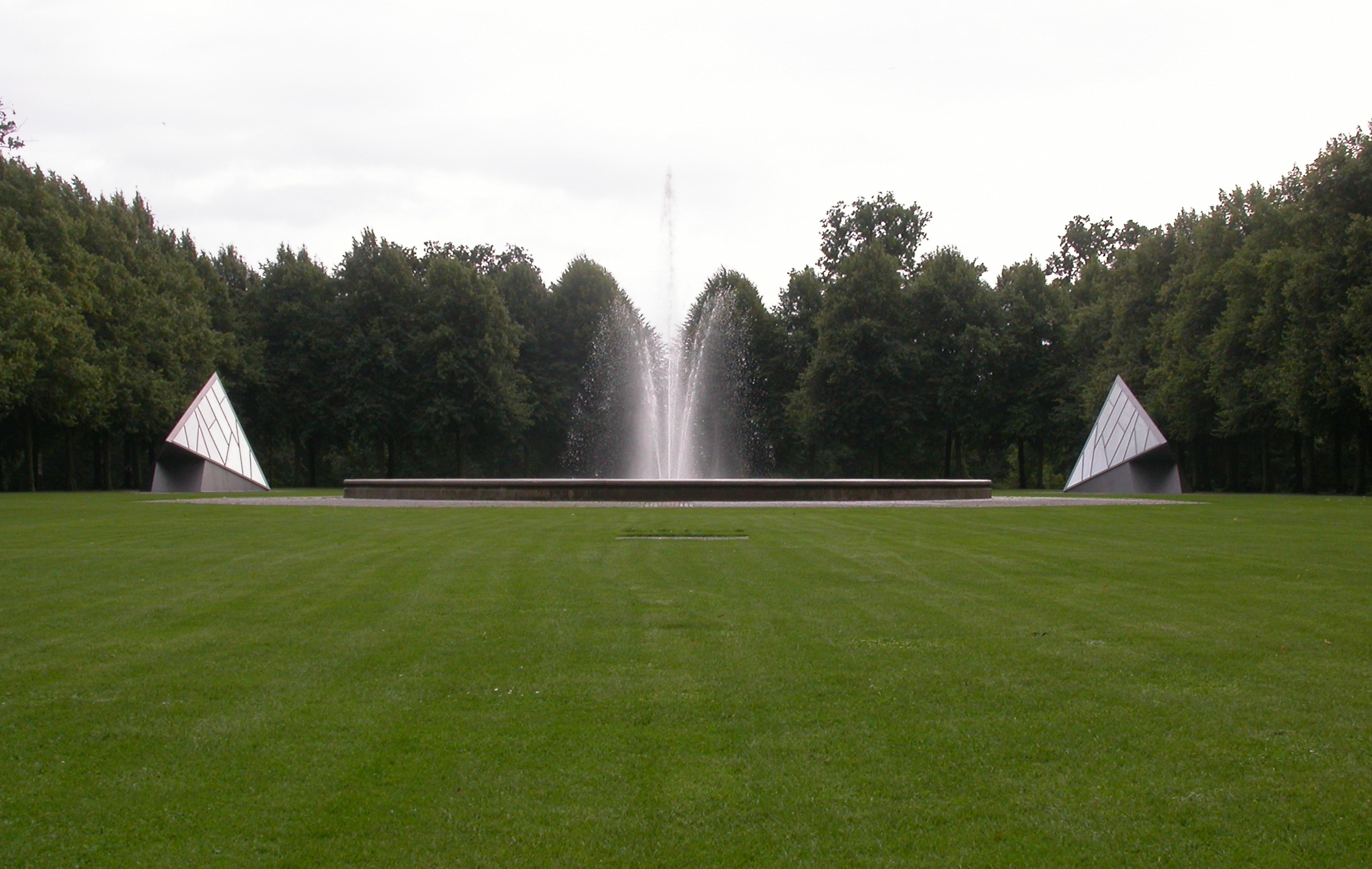
Cisternerne (2007)

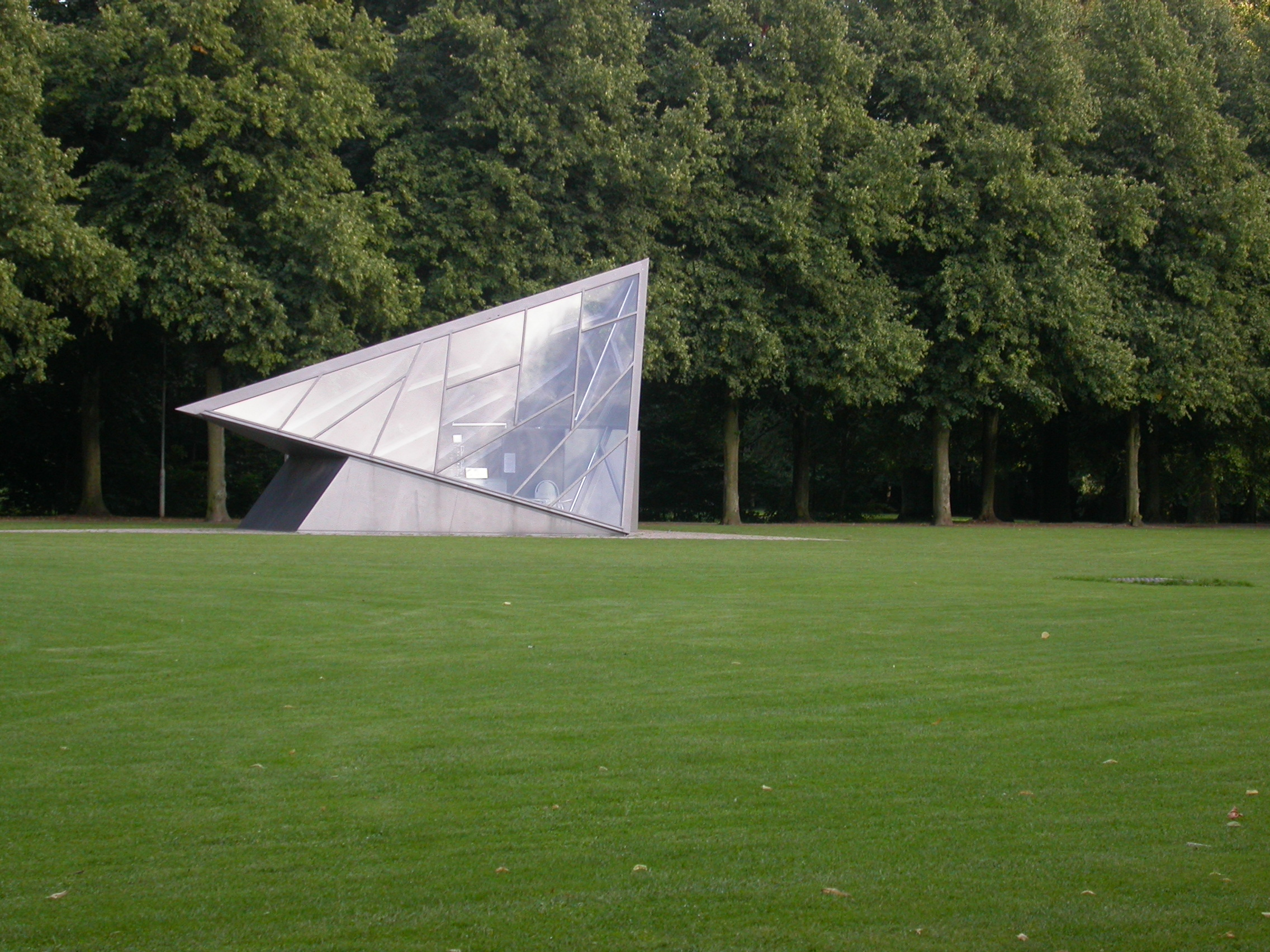
Cisternerne entrance

== Cisternerne today ==
Today, Cisternerne is a part of the Frederiksberg Museums (Frederiksbergmuseerne). The old subterranean water reservoir of Søndermarken shows exhibitions of contemporary art. The huge dripstone cave is sparsely lit, the climate is moist and cool.

Every year, Cisternerne invites an internationally recognized artist or architect to create a large-scale exhibition particular to this underground space, interacting with and emphasizing the unique architecture, climate, atmosphere and history of Cisternerne. The art projects that unfold at the Cisternerne are site-specific and cannot be built or rebuilt any other place in the world.

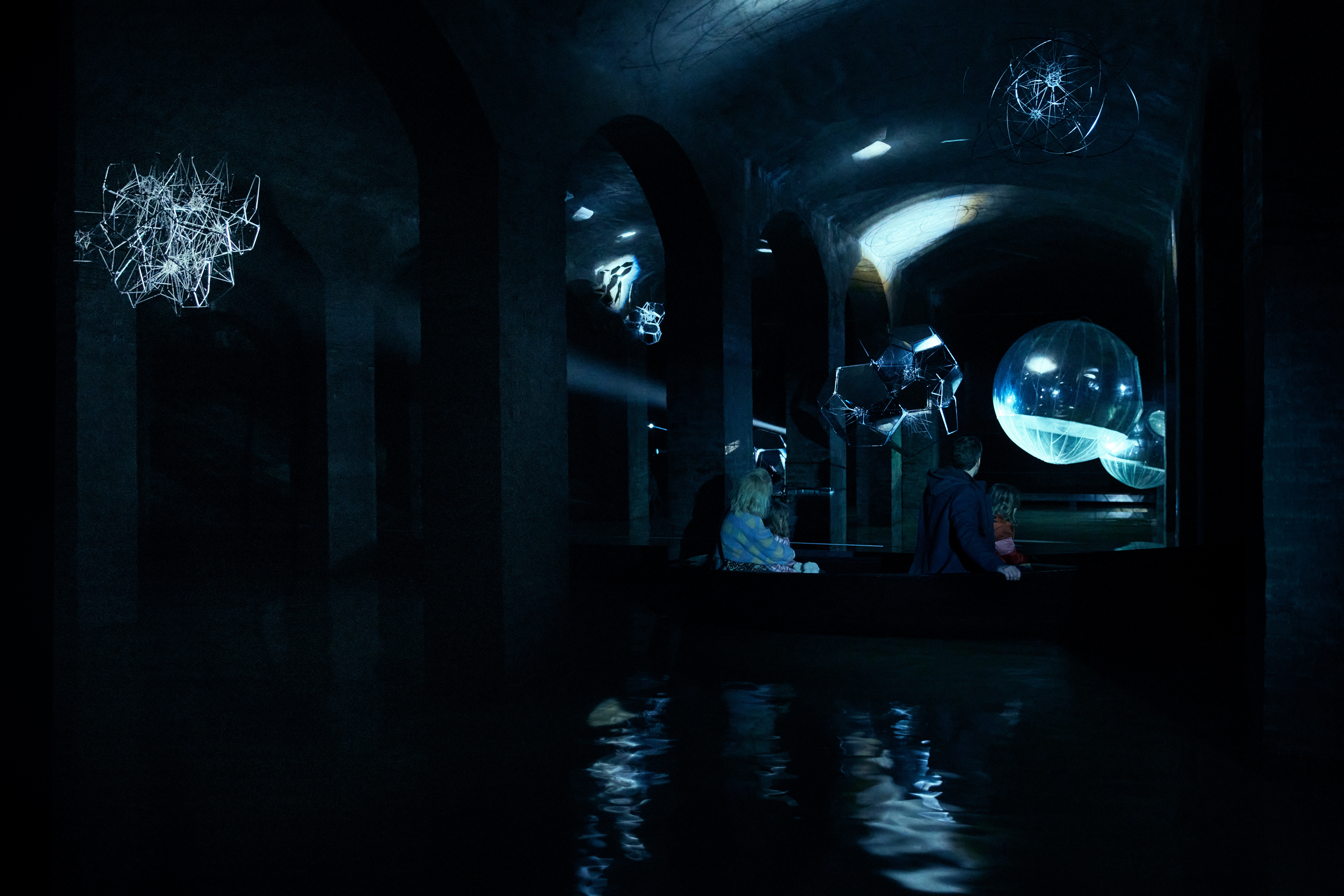
2020-21: Event Horizon by Tomás Saraceno in Cisternerne

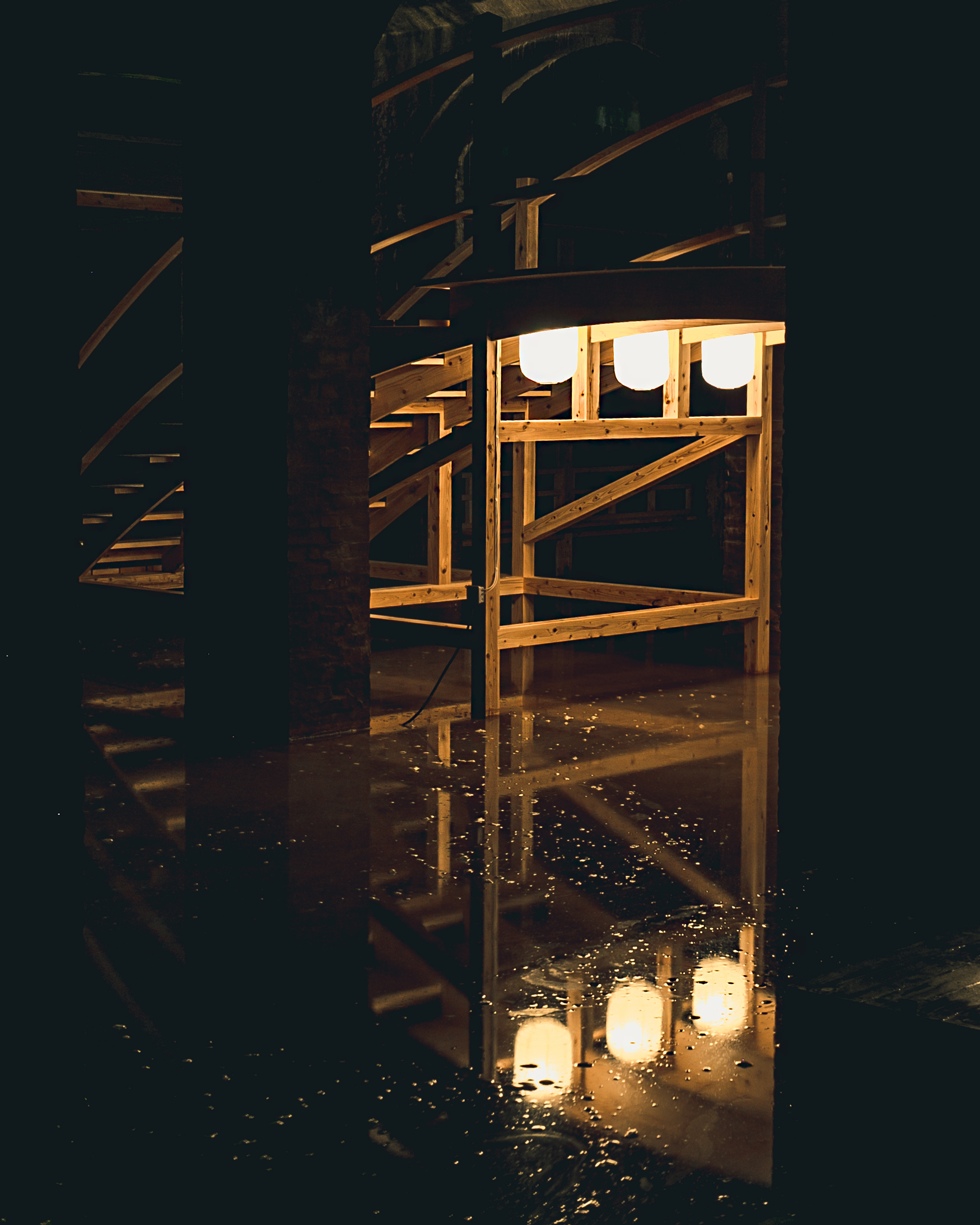
2017: The Water by Hiroshi Sambuichi in Cisternerne

== History ==
Cisternerne, an abandoned subterranean reservoir, once contained the supply of drinking water for the Danish capital and could hold as much as 16 million litres of clean water. Excavation began in 1856. Taking only three years to complete, the great structure quickly helped to alleviate many of the water supply problems of the day; but by 1933, the city’s cisterns ceased their function as a reservoir for drinking water, and they were finally drained in 1981.

In 1996, during Copenhagen’s year as the designated European City of Culture (later known as European Capital of Culture), the underground water reservoir was put to use as an exhibition space. The expedition was a joint initiative between the City of Frederiksberg and gallery owner Max Seidenfaden, who continued to run Cisternerne as a museum of modern glass art from 2001 to 2013.

From 2013, Cisternerne became a part of the Frederiksberg Museums (Frederiksbergmuseerne) and was turned into an exhibition space for contemporary art.

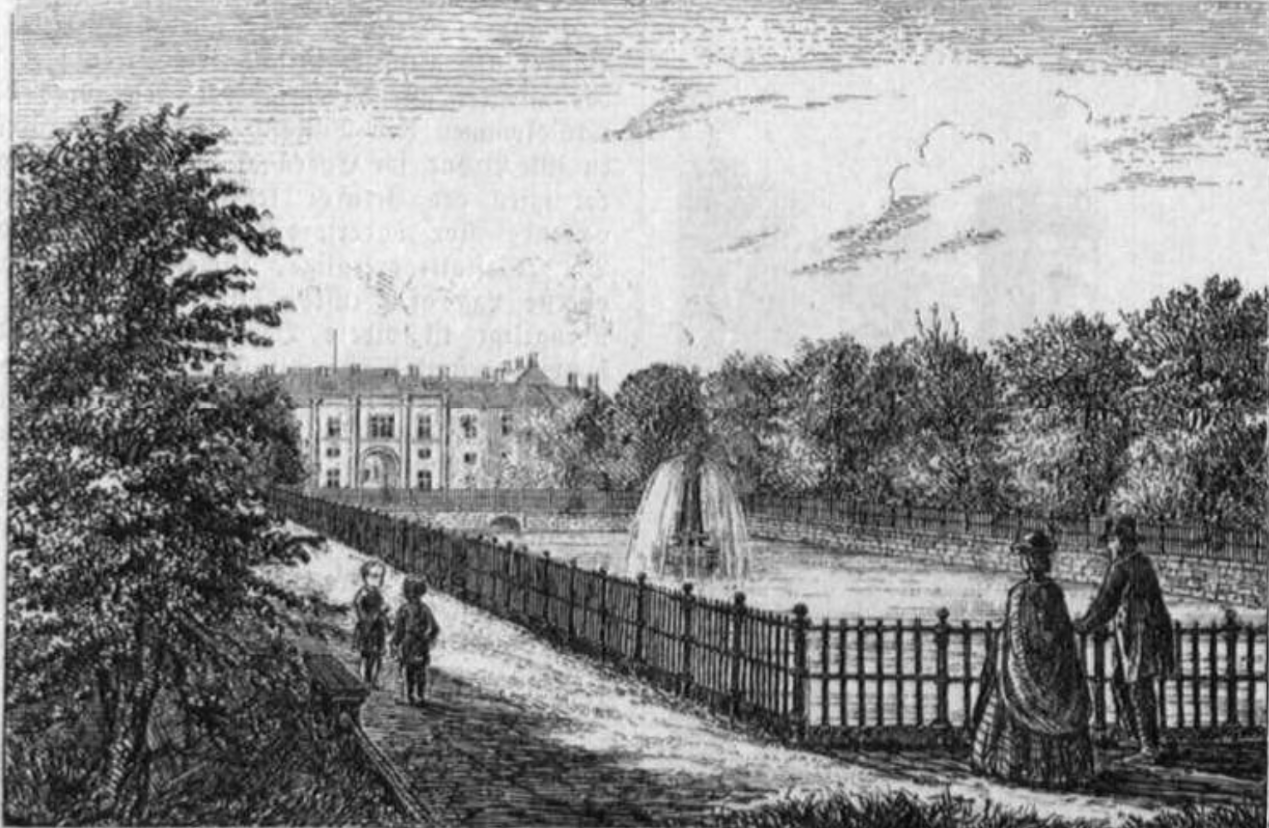
The water basin on the top of Frederiksberg Bakke

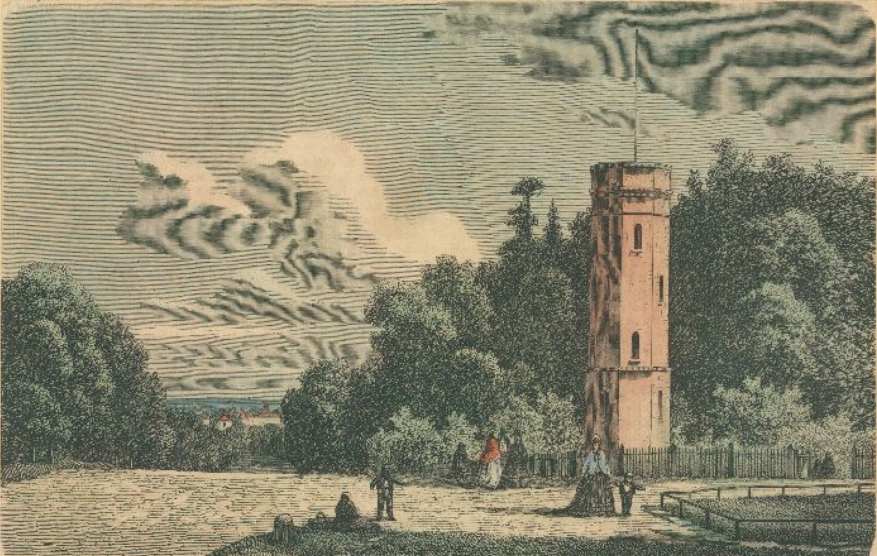
The water tower

== Dripstone Cave ==
Cisternerne is the only real dripstone cave in Denmark. The formation of stalactites and stalagmites is a common phenomenon in concrete structures and can be seen in tunnels, at metro stations and in shelters around Copenhagen. Yet none anywhere can offer the sheer magnitude and diversity of those found here, for these dripstones have been allowed to grow for decades.

The dripstones in Cisternerne are beautiful, fragile and fascinating and at the same time a sign of the slow decay of the building. The formation of the dripstones happens as water from Soendermarken seeps through the concrete ceiling, the water dissolves the basic calcareous minerals in the concrete.

The dripstones in Cisternerne are a reminder of how nature slowly but certainly dominates what we build and believe we control.

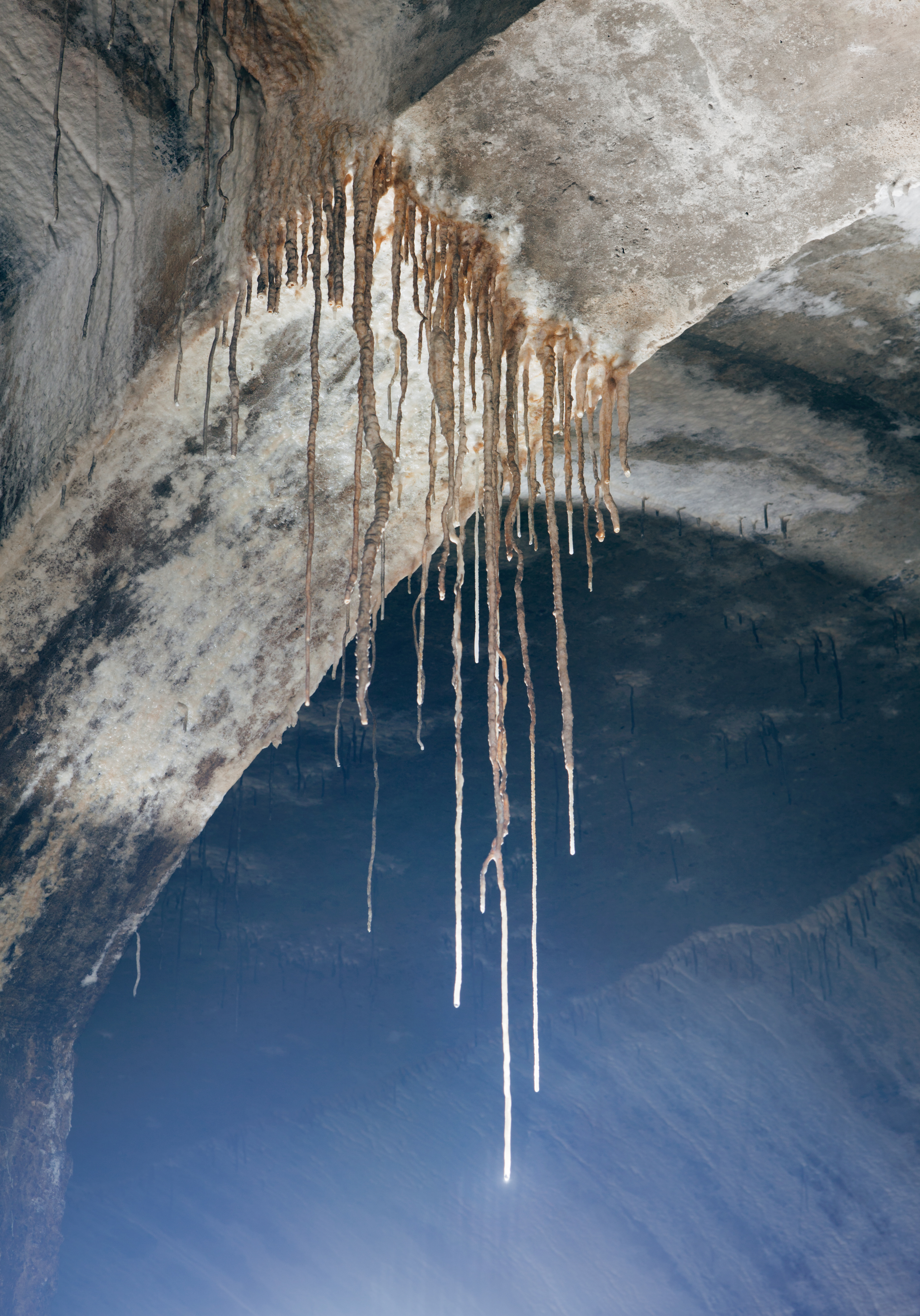
