= Michael Kvium =

Danish artist (born 1955)

Michael Otto Albert Kvium (born 15 November 1955) is a Danish artist. He has excelled in a number of fields such as painting, illustrating, sculpting and various performance genres. Since the early 1980s, he has created grotesque realistic works, depicting the darker side of life.

== Biography ==
Born in Horsens in the east of Jutland, Kvium studied painting at the Royal Danish Academy of Fine Arts under Albert Mertz and Stig Brøgger. His paintings and graphic works often resemble comic strip art or extensions of 17th-century Baroque paintings. They depict the more negative aspects of Western culture. Motifs include grotesque monsters, half man half woman, sometimes approaching self-portraits. In 1981, together with Erik A. Frandsen and Christian Lemmerz, he was one of the cofounders of Værkstedet Værst, a collaborative workshop for performance art. From the 1980s, his works include virus-like shapes as part of the growth cycles. Works from the 1990s also include bandaged figures depicting paralysis and claustrophobia as can be seen in Kor (1991). Solo exhibitions at ARoS Aarhus Kunstmuseum (2006) and Ordrupgaard (2007) have included large works evoking relationships with the landscape and nature. His works also include videos, comic strips and performances. He has created stage sets in collaboration with Katrine Wiedemann. Together with Christian Lemmerz, in 2000 he created an eight-hour-long silent film titled The Wake inspired by James Joyce's Finnegans Wake.

Kvium's works are included in the collections of many of Denmark's museums and galleries.

== Awards ==
In 2001, Kvium was awarded the Eckersberg Medal. In 2010, he was decorated with the Order of the Dannebrog.

== Literature ==
- Gottlieb, Lennart; Kvium, Michael (2002). Michael Kvium: malerier og motiver. Lindhardt og Ringhof. ISBN 978-87-614-0282-0.
- Michael Kvium: Fools / edited by Erlend Høyersten. - Aarhus, ARoS Aarhus Kunstmuseum, 2014.
- Saligia: Michael Kvium / edited by AnnCatrin Gummesson. - Helsingborg, Dunkers Kulturhus, 2015.
- Michael Kvium: Think Bigger / edited by Vera Westergaard ... [et al.]. - Kolding, Trapholt, 2017.
- Circus Europa: Michael Kvium / edited by Camilla Jalving ... [et al.]. - Ishøj, Arken, 2017.
