= Wrensted =

Wrensted is a surname. Notable people with the surname include:

- Benedicte Wrensted (1859–1949), Danish-born photographer who emigrated to the United States
- Murray Wrensted (born 1964), Australian rules footballer
