= Ludvig Grundtvig =

Danish photographer and portrait painter

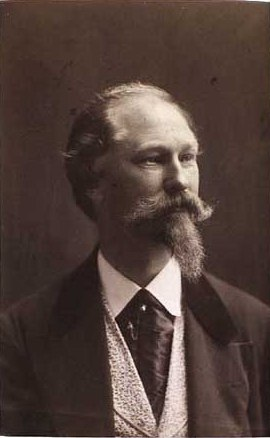
Ludvig Grundtvig: self-portrait

Ludvig Grundtvig (12 May 1836 – 28 November 1901) was a Danish photographer and portrait painter. He based many of his later paintings on his own photographs.

== Early life ==
Born in Nykøbing Falster, Grundtvig studied at the Danish Academy from 1851 to 1857, winning two awards.

== Professional career ==
For a number of years, Grundvig exhibited his portrait paintings at Charlottenborg in Copenhagen. In 1863, he set up a studio as a photographer on Amagertorv in the centre of the city which he maintained until his death in 1901. But he also continued to produce paintings and drawings in his studio, many based on his own photographs. Although he specialized in portraits, he also took landscapes such as the large photograph of the cliffs of Bornholm from 1870 which can be seen in the Royal Library of Denmark.

== Titles and exhibitions ==
In 1867, Grundtvig became a member of the Dansk Fotografisk Forening (Danish Photographers Association). In 1871, he was the judge for photography at the Nordic Industry and Art Exhibition.

He exhibited at Charlottenborg in 1857, 1859, 1861–1864 and 1893.

== Sources ==
This article draws heavily on Ludvig Grundtvig's biography at Kunstindeks Denmark.

== See also ==
- Photography in Denmark
