= Peter Faber (disambiguation) =

Peter Faber (1506–1546), a French Jesuit co-founder of the Society of Jesus.

Peter Faber may also refer to:

- Pierre Favre (musician) (born 1937), jazz drummer
- Peter Faber (actor) (1943–2026), Dutch film and television actor
- Peter Faber (telegraph specialist) (1810–1877), Danish songwriter, photographer and telegraphy expert
