= Astrid Kruse Jensen =

Danish photographer (born 1975)

Astrid Kruse Jensen (born 1975) is a Danish photographer and visual artist. She studied at the Gerrit Rietveld Academie in the Netherlands and the Glasgow School of Art in Scotland. Her artistic work is often characterized by its dreamy qualities, blurring the boundaries between memory, consciousness, reality, and illusion.

Astrid Krusen Jensen has been nominated for several awards, and her work has been exhibited extensively in Europe, as well as in America and Asia. Her work is represented in several collections such as The National Museum for Photography, Denmark, The George Eastman House, Rochester, USA, Artotheque de Caen, France, Manchester City Gallery, UK and at AROS, Aarhus Kunstmuseum, Denmark.

Astrid Kruse Jensen lives and works in Copenhagen.

== Early life ==
Born in 1975 in Aarhus, Jutland, Astrid Kruse Jensen began her education as a visual artist in 1995, when she studied at the School for Photography in Aarhus. In 1998, she continued her studies in the Netherlands at the Gerrit Rietveld Academy of Design in Amsterdam, and in 2002, she graduated after having spent two years at the Glasgow School of Art's Fine Art Photography department.

Astrid Kruse Jensen is represented by Martin Asbæk Gallery in Copenhagen and Wetterling Gallery in Stockholm

== Photography ==
The paradox in the work of Astrid Kruse Jensen is her ability to use photography as a means of bringing reality together with the imaginary. She uses her camera as a tool for telling stories. Picking on quite ordinary subjects, she brings us images which suggest more than they actually show, allowing the beholder to interpret their full meaning. In 2014, Astrid Kruse Jensen received The ARKEN Travel Grant, donated by the Annie & Otto Johs. Detlefs’ Almennyttige Foundation. The purpose of the travel grant is to further young artists’ and curators’ knowledge of and dialogue with the international art scene, and Astrid Kruse Jensen was awarded the ARKEN Travel Grant 2014 for her ability to highlight staged, contrasting and eternal states through photography. The committee described how Astrid Kruse Jensen’s work created common stories that send the viewer on an emotionally powerful journey into our memories.

In Fragments of Remembrance, the director of the Frederiksberg Museums Astrid La Cour writes: “Astrid Kruse Jensen's work with photography in recent years has been closely associated with an exploration of the concept of memory as a state of consciousness that bridges time and space. In this state her works are involved in constant motion between disappearance and appearance; between the discreet modelling of darkness and dazzling effacement by light. And within this field Astrid Kruse Jensen allows the chemical origins of photography to penetrate the subject and at one and the same time draw attention to its indispensability in the process of developing and its role as a filter that obscures, affects and forms the subject. The intrusive structures of the chemistry become an active, abstract visual processing of the fragmentary impressions of memory.”

In her recent ethereal series “Disappearing into the Past”, “Within the Landscape” and “Floating”, Astrid Kruse Jensen uses an old Polaroid camera and expired film to introduce unpredictability into her painterly compositions, creating light-drenched images that veer between concrete and mental landscapes. In her earlier series, Astrid Kruse Jensen used advanced technology to manipulate the light and darkness in her works. But here, Astrid Kruse Jensen takes advantage of the technical limitations and uncontrollable chemical processes of the Polaroid camera.

Behind this choice of imperfection lies not only a desire to challenge traditional working methods, but also an unmistakable acknowledgement of personal vulnerability, a desire to let go – and relinquish herself to a medium that is impossible to control. Astrid Kruse Jensen’s use of double exposures, backlight, long shutter times and camera movements results in motifs out of focus, where the specific space is dissolved and erased. In “Floating”, Astrid la Cour describes how Kruse Jensen’s work is “specifically photographic and decidedly painterly. Interiors and landscapes are located in an eternal interchange between a concrete and an abstract reality. She works with photography’s ability to record more than the human eye can capture and thus opens up a picture space that can only be rendered by way of the photographic gaze.”

In her work, interiors and landscapes are dissolved in abstractions, which opens up an endless borderland or “a metaphysical universe transcending time and space”, a state between the concrete and the abstract that questions photography as a mediums and its documentational heritage. In 2017, Astrid Kruse Jensen was among 5 female artists, who were awarded with the painter Anne Marie Telmányis grant for female artist over the age of 40, who have made a remarkable artistic contribution in Denmark. The committee highlighted Astrid Kruse Jensen’s creation of works, which “question what we see … her realistic scenarios are floating and dreamy … and the unreal and fairytale-like penetrates us … and remains in the afterthought as a poetic imprint.”

In 2021, Astrid Kruse Jensen received national attention for her duo-exhibition The Past Ahead of Me at Fotografisk Center, where she exhibited together with Norwegian photo-based artist Marie Sjøvold. The exhibition focused on subjects such as family, fragility, grief and loss, and here, Astrid Kruse Jensen also presented embroidery and bronze works. The square-shaped embroideries, titled Impossible Photographs, have the same format at the Polaroid photo, and the white text on the white background is difficult to read and bears the same sense of disappearance as her photographic works. The exhibition also included experimental approaches to photography, included photograph presented on fabric and bronze plates.

== Exhibitions ==
Astrid Kruse Jensen's website provides the following list of solo exhibitions:

2021

- Fortiden foran mig, Fotografisk Center, Copenhagen, Denmark
- Floating, Wetterling Gallery, Stockholm, Sweden

2019

- Floating, Fotocentrum Raseburg, Karis, Finland
- Floating, Martin Asbæk Gallery, Copenhagen, Denmark

2018

- Memories and Hidden Places, Hafnarborg Centre of Culture and Fine Art, Hafnarfjordur, Iceland

2016

- Reflections, Wetterling Gallery, Stockholm, Sweden

2015

- Out of focus, Esbjerg Kunstmuseum, Esbjerg, Denmark
- Beauty Will Always Be Disturbed, Wetterling Gallery, Stockholm, Sweden
- Fragments of Remembrance, Martin Asbæk Gallery, Copenhagen, Denmark

2014

- Within The Landscape, Sven Harrys Kunstmuseum, Stockholm, Sweden
- Within The Landscape, Johannes Larsen Museet, Kerteminde, Denmark

2013

- Astrid Kruse Jensen, La villa Culture, Ganshoren, Belgium
- Astrid Kruse Jensen, La Venerie, Bruxelles, Belgium
- Astrid Kruse Jensen, De Bourglinster, Luxembourg

2012

- Disappearing into the past, Fotoforum, Stadtmuseum Schleswig, Germany
- Disappearing into the past, Rønnebæksholm, Næstved, Denmark
- Disappearing into the past, Martin Asbæk Gallery, Copenhagen, Denmark
- Disappearing into the past, Museet for Fotokunst, Odense, Denmark

2011

- On the other side of twilight, dual show with Elle Kooi, Stedelijk Museum, Holland
- Enchanted Spaces, Ruchika's Art Gallery, Goa, India
- Parallel Realities, Backslash Gallery, Paris, France
- Disappearing into the past, Brundlund Slot, Aabenraa, Denmark

2010

- Between the Real and the Imaginary, Maison du Danemark, Paris, France
- The Construction of Memories, Galerie Mikael Andersen, Copenhagen, Denmark
- Enchanted Spaces, Ganges Art gallery, Kolkata, India
- Between the Real and the Imaginary, Galerie Mikael Andersen, Berlin, Germany

2009

- Between the Real and the Imaginary, Artotheque de Caen, Caen, France
- Hidden Places / Enchanted Spaces, The Viewing Room, Mumbai, India

2008

- Between the Real and the Imaginary, Vestsjællands Art Museum, Sorø, Denmark
- Indefinite Spaces, Galerie Mikael Andersen, Berlin, Germany

2007

- Selected Works, Konrad-Adenauer-Stiftung, Berlin, Germany

2006

- Hypernatural, Centrum Kultury Zamek, Poznan, Poland
- Hypernatural, Galleri Hornbaek, Hornbaek, Denmark
- Parallel Landscapes, La Galeria, Barcelona, Spain
- Power of Place, Harbourfront Centre, Toronto, Canada
- Hypernatural, Kaunas Photo Days, Kaunas, Lithuania
- Parallel Landscapes, Galerie Mikael Andersen, Copenhagen, Denmark

2005

- Allusions of Home, Women's Festival, Ljubljana, Slovenia
- Hypernatural, Galleri Image, Aarhus, Denmark

2004

- Imaginary Realities, Philips Contemporary Art Gallery, Manchester, UK
- Imaginary Realities, Galleri Skuggi, Reykjavik, Iceland

== Publications ==
- Floating, 2021. ISBN 978-91-87241-41-3
- Beauty Will Always Be Disturbed, 2015. ISBN 978-38-68285-79-6
- Disappearing into the Past, 2012. ISBN 978-87-88376-38-8
- Imaginary Realities, Hypernatural, Parallel Landscapes, Indefinite Spaces. Selected works by Astrid Kruse Jensen, 2006. ISBN 87-7603-046-6

== See also ==
- Photography in Denmark
