= Frederikke Federspiel =

Danish photographer (1839–1913)

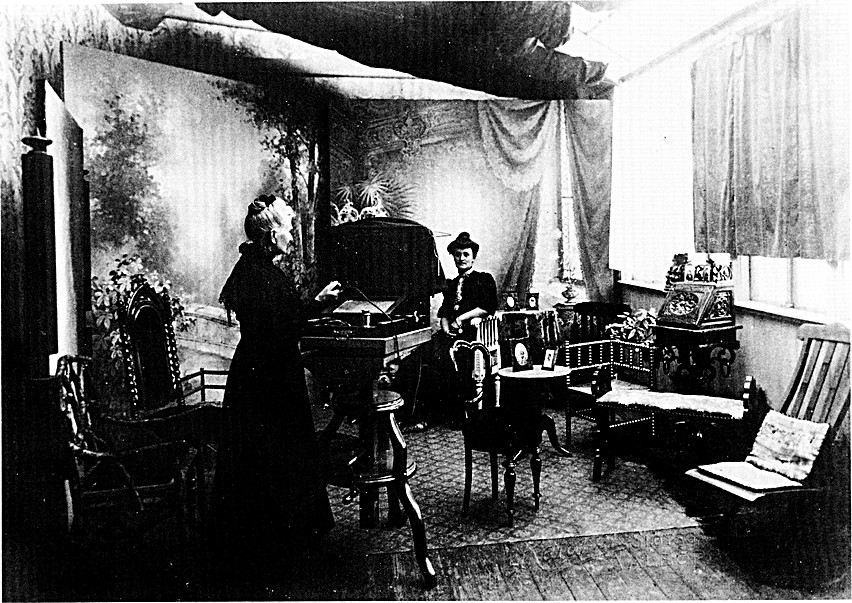
Frederikke Federspiel with client (1910)

Frederikke Jakobine Federspiel (1839–1913) was the first female photographer to practice in Denmark. For many years, she ran her own photographic studio in Aalborg, always keeping abreast of the latest developments. Among her clients were the Danish princesses Dagmar and Alexandra who were attracted by her photo enamel jewelry.

== Early life ==
Born in Horsens, Jutland, she was brought up in a bourgeois home together with her sister and five brothers. Her father died when she was only six after which her mother earned a living as a milliner. After her mother's death in 1874, she went to Hamburg to learn photography. Living with her uncle, Poul Friedrich Lewitz, and her aunt Juliane, she became an apprentice to her cousin Alfred Lewitz, also a photographer. In her diary she records how much she enjoyed her year in Hamburg with many excursions, evenings at the theatre and wonderful meals.

== Working as a photographer ==
After completing her apprenticeship in 1876, Frederikke Federspiel returned to Denmark, where she was the first women to apply for a licence to trade in photography. She settled in Aalborg with her sister Sophie. While her sister exercised her trade in lingerie and embroidery in the living room, Frederikke set up a photographic studio on the top floor. There were already two photographers in Aalborg, one of whom was the well-established Heinrich Tønnies. She was aware of the competition but astutely publicized her business, always ensuring she kept up with evolving technology.

For extended periods, she managed to run the second most prosperous photographic business in the city. In 1878, she fell ill and spent eight months in hospital followed by a further three months at St. Oluf's sanitorium in Modum, Norway. She was to return to the spa several times in later years. With her sister, she spent her summer holidays at the new seaside resorts of Blokhus, Løkken and Fanø.

In 1883, Frederikke Federspiel and Nielsine Zehngraf from Randers were among the first women to become members of the Danish Photographers Association. Frederikke was an active member, contributing to the Association's membership album. In 1885, she won recognition for donating portraits. She also exhibited her work in Copenhagen, often participating in person as she did in 1888.

In 1899, she started to produce enamel jewelry and cufflinks embedded with photographs using direct positives produced with a four-lensed multiplicator camera. She had made special arrangements for the equipment to be imported from the United States to facilitate the work. The jewelry was shown at a Christmas exhibition at Copenhagen's Industry Association, attracting the attention of the royal family. As a result, she was able to count Princess Alexandra and Tsaritsa Dagmar among her clients.

== Keeping abreast of technology ==
Always interested in the latest technical developments, she was quick to start using dry plates which offered a safer and cheaper method of exposure and development. She was also one of the first to experiment with magnesium power for flash and she installed electric lamps in her studio when electricity came to Aalborg in 1901.

In the early 1900s, she began to sell cameras for amateur photographers. Among her students and assistants were Ernst Gøpel, Fritz Karner and Georg Bendtzen Holm who would later become leading photographers.

== Overall assessment ==
Frederikke Federspiel constantly adopted developments in photography although, on the occasion of the 25th anniversary of her studio, she stated that her business had not evolved as she had hoped. Nevertheless, when she died in 1913, the Dansk Fotografisk Tidsskrift (Danish Photography Magazine) characterized her as "an unusually likable, honest and energetic lady whose work has been counted among the best."

== See also ==
- Photography in Denmark
- History of photography
