= Jesper Høm =

Danish photographer and film director (1931–2000)

Ib Jesper Brieghel Høm (5 October 1931 – 1 March 2000) was a Danish photographer and film director. After opening his own studio in Copenhagen, he travelled widely, finally working for Agence VISA in Paris. Høm was a co-founder of Copenhagen's Delta Photos, an organization designed to inspire and assist press photographers. Most of the remainder of his career was devoted to film, where he participated in the making of several Danish films as cinematographer, screenwriter and director.

== Career ==
=== Still photography ===
Jesper Høm was the son of Paul Brieghel Høm and Kirsten Mariane Henriksen, who were both artists. From 1948 to 1950, he received training in photography at Gutenberghus, a magazine publisher in Copenhagen, after which he spent a year working as a fashion photographer for Jardin des Modes in Paris.

The year he spent in Paris introduced Høm to the most advanced photography of the times, not least the work of the American-born photographer William Klein who excelled in expressiveness and appreciation of the decisive moment. Høm was quick to take up these new ideas, adapting them to his own style and promoting photography as an art.

From 1955 to 1959, he ran his own studio in Copenhagen concentrating on architectural and design photography. He then went to San Francisco where he worked for Weiner & Gossage, an advertising agency. As a freelancer, he worked in New York City and for an extended period in Ireland. He then spent three years working for Agence VISA in Paris with assignments in England, Spain, France, Italy and the Soviet Union. His photographs were published by Stern and Paris Match, culminating in his book Meet the Danes in 1964.

Taking the French-based international photographic bureau Magnum as a model, together with Gregers Nielsen and others he set up Delta Photos in 1964. The organization was designed to support press photography in Denmark.

=== Cinema ===
Høm began as a film photographer in Astrid Henning-Jensen's 1967 short film Min bedstefar er en stok, followed by the children's film Thomas er fredløs and several others. One of two films he directed was Smil Emil in 1969, which became an award-winning success. In 1973, together with his wife Elsebeth Reingaard, he opened the Delta Art Cinema which later became known as the Delta Bio. The venture had a very positive effect on spreading interest in quality filmmaking in Denmark. However, as a result of financial difficulties, he gave up his job as cinema manager in 1979. In 1985, he was one of the founders of the Danish-Swedish photography agency Billedhuset. In 1986, he returned to filmmaking with the successful Take It Easy in which Eddie Skoller played the role of jazz musician Leo Mathisen.

== Exhibitions, works and awards ==
Jesper Høm has exhibited widely, written several books and participated in a number of films:

=== Exhibitions ===
- Louisiana, Humlebæk, 1959
- Danish Museum of Art & Design, 1963
- Landesbildstelle, Hamburg, 1964
- Meet the Danes, 1964 New York World's Fair, 1964–65
- Kunstpavillion, Esbjerg, 1982
- Joy of Timing, Forte dei Marmi, Italy, 1982
- Nye farvefotografier, Galleri Asbæk, Copenhagen, 1982
- Galleri Image, Århus, 1983
- Irske billeder, Louisiana, 1986
- Retrospective. Øjeblikkets fascination (The fascination of the moment), Museumsbygningen (gallery), 2015

=== Books ===
- Say Cheese...and Cry, 1959
- Sådan er Danmark, sådan da (photos by Jesper Høm and Bror Bernild, commentary by Henning Nystad), 1961
- Meet the Danes, 1964
- Nogen kalder os glædespiger (commentary by Erik Nørgaard), 1975
- Børnenes Billedbog (with Sven Grønlykke), 1975
- Samba (commentary by Henrik Stangerup), 1982
- Joy of Timing, 1982
- Brasiliansk fodbold, 1984
- Toneangivende danskere, 1991

=== Films ===
- Min bedstefar er en stok (cinematographer), 1967
- Balladen om Carl-Henning [Ballad of Carl-Henning] (cinematographer), 1968
- Smil Emil [Smile, Emil] (writer, director, cinematographer), 1969
- Stille dage i Clichy [Quiet Days in Clichy] (cinematographer), 1970
- Thorvald og Linda (cinematographer with Claus Loof), 1982
- Take it Easy (writer, director, cinematographer), 1986

=== Awards ===
- Star Photographer of the Year, London, 1967
- Filmfondets Årspris, 1970

== See also ==
- Photography in Denmark
- Cinema of Denmark
