= Rudolph Striegler =

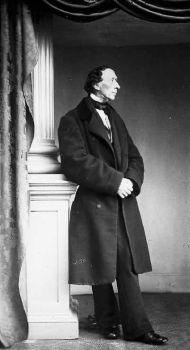
Rudolph Striegler: carte-de-visite photograph of Hans Christian Andersen (1861)

Peter Ludvig Rudolph Striegler (4 October 1816 – 24 January 1876) was one of Denmark's early photographers, specialising in portrait photography.

Trained as a picture-framer, Strieger opened Odense's first daguerreotype studio in 1846. With his experience of gold-plating, he was able to combine photography with ornate framing. Until 1857, he travelled widely around the country until he finally moved to Copenhagen.

In 1860, he introduced carte-de-visite photography to Denmark. The idea of using a photograph instead of a printed visiting card came from France where it was patented by André Adolphe Eugène Disdéri in 1854 with a four-lensed camera which could take from eight to twelve photographs on the same glass negative. As the prints could be collected in albums, the technique became extremely popular.

In 1861, while court photographer, he was awarded the Ingenio et Arti medal.

He was also one of the early photographers who took portraits of Hans Christian Andersen. In his diary entry for 22 October 1861, Andersen writes: "Stood for Siegler until 11.30 and had a few large and small pictures taken of me."

== See also ==
- Photography in Denmark
- History of photography
