= Jette Bang =

Danish photographer and filmmaker

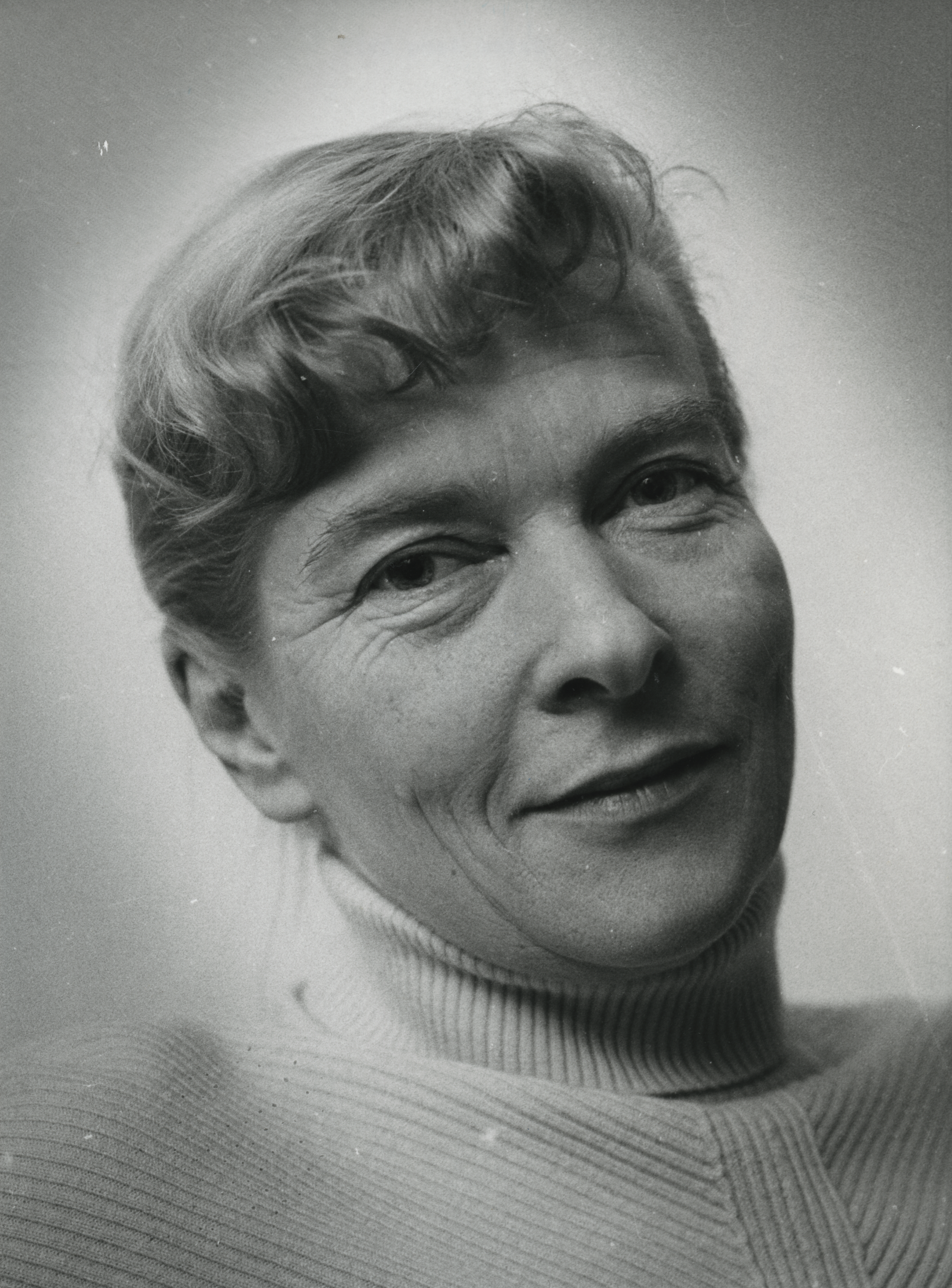
Jette Bang

Jette Bang (February 4, 1914 – February 16, 1964) was a Danish photographer and film maker who is remembered for the large collection of photographs and films she took in Greenland, depicting the country and the way of life of its inhabitants before their old culture disappeared.

== Early life ==
The daughter of a tobacco merchant, Bang was born in Frederiksberg in 1914. She grew up in the Copenhagen district of Christianshavn near Grønlands Handels Plads from where she could see the ships leaving for Greenland. After graduating in philosophy at the University of Copenhagen, she spent three years as an apprentice with Jonals Co., a photography firm.

On completing her training, she went straight to the Danish Greenland Administration with a plan to photograph Greenlandic communities. Though she was unable to convince them of the importance of her project, she did obtain permission to travel to Greenland at her own cost.

== Career ==
In 1936, Bang arrived in Greenland for the first time and spent eight months taking photographs of the traditional lifestyle of the Greenlandic Inuit, which was beginning to die out as a result of European influence. She travelled around on dog sleds and lived with the natives, sharing their way of life. After the trip, some of her photographs were exhibited at the Danish Museum of Art & Design in 1937 and were published in her book Grønland (1940) with a foreword by Minister of State Thorvald Stauning. The book was an eyeopener for the Danes.

Her next expedition in the winter of 1938–1939 was supported by Denmark's Greenland Administration, who provided a motorboat, lighting and helpers. Under harsh and primitive conditions, she lived closely together with the Greenlanders, spending most of the winter in a hole in the ground with floor space of just four square metres. Joining the Thule postal sleds, she travelled across Melville Bay up to Cape York in the district of Thule. Her trip resulted in a revealing colour film, Inuit, seen as a work of art when it was shown in Denmark in 1938. The film was in two parts, depicting the old and the new Greenland. The reels on Melville Bay were lost in a fire while she was in Thule but there was still enough material for a four-hour production.

For a time, Jette Bang hoped to go back and take some additional shots but her plans were brought to a standstill by the outbreak of the Second World War. Only after the liberation in 1945 was she able to continue her project.

Many stills taken from the film were published in her book 30.000 Kilometer med Sneglefart (30,000 kilometers at a snail's pace) (1941). Bang, a good storyteller, was able to provide an excellent account of her experiences. With the photo book Grønlænderbørn (Greenlandic Children) (1944) she continued to report on her travels, now addressing Danish schoolchildren.

She travelled to Greenland five more times. Disappointed with modern developments there, she published her book Grønland igen(Greenland again) in 1961. In 1962, she travelled to Greenland for the last time, trying to rework her 1938 colour film; but illness prevented any more trips.

In 1959, she took part in Peter Glob's archaeological expedition to Bahrain, which led to her film Beduiner (1962).

== Assessment ==
Jette Bang was the first photographer to take close-up portraits of the Greenlanders. While earlier photographers had been more interested in their clothing and surroundings, she was more concerned with their behaviour, creating more lasting and universal impressions.

Jette Bang's photographs from Greenland are the only remaining material documenting the old Greelandic way of life which has now almost disappeared. Her dedication to the country and its people was legendary. She was also a talented author: "The full moon's twisted face tripped up over the tops of the pointed peaks in the north west like a fakir trying to walk on a bed of nails," she wrote in 30.000 Kilometer med Sneglefart.

Many of her photographs are in the National Museum of Greenland in Nuuk. The main collection of 12,000 photographs is with the Arktisk Institut in Copenhagen, which has made them available on the Internet.)

== Bibliography ==
- Bang, Jette: Grønland, Forord af Statsminister Stauning, Indledning af Knud Oldendow, Copenhagen, 1940, 189 pp.
- Bang, Jette: 30.000 Kilometer med Sneglefart, Copenhagen: Steen Hasselbalch, 1941, 191 pp.
- Bang, Jette: Grønlænderbørn, Copenhagen, 1944, 31 pp.
- Bang, Jette: Grønland igen, (Billederne reproduceret efter Jette Bangs egne optagelser), Copenhagen: Spectator, 1962, 154 pp.
- Bang, Jette; Ferdinand, Klaus; Korsholm Nielsen, Hans Chr.; Moesgård Museum; National Council for Culture, Arts, and Heritage of the State of Qatar, Den danske ekspedition til Qatar 1959, published by Højbjerg: Moesgård Museum: S.l.: in cooperation with The National Council for Culture, Arts, and Heritage of the State of Qatar, 2007, 144 pp.

== Films ==
- Den yderste Ø (1937)
- Inuit (1938)
- De frivillige arbejdslejre (1941)
- Ad lange veje (1952)
- Et nyt Grønland (1954)
- En boplads i Østgrønland (1961)
- Beduiner (1962)
- Trommedans i Thule (1964)
- Forår i Sermiligaq (TV 15.4. 1964)

== Source ==
- Jette Bang's biography in Dansk kvindebiograpfisk Leksikon (in Danish)
- Jette Bang : Artworks by the artist in Danish museums
