= Pietro Boyesen =

Danish photographer (1819–1882)

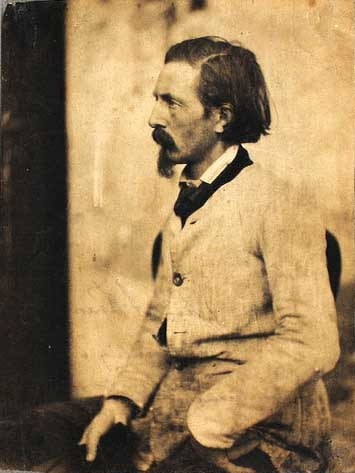
Pietro Boyesen (self portrait)

Pietro (Peter) Thyge Boyesen (20 May 1819–1882) was a Danish photographer who spent most of his professional life in Rome. He is remembered in particular for his portraits of Scandinavians visiting Rome, many of which are now in the Royal Library in Copenhagen.

== Early life ==
Boyesen was born in Copenhagen on 20 May 1819 or 1820. His parents were Peter Thyge Boyesen, a wholesaler, and Maria Christine Lange. After training as a painter's apprentice, he went to Munich in 1845 together with his colleague Theodor Meldahl, a brother of the architect Ferdinand Meldahl. Here he stayed for 10 years, working as a photographer before leaving for Rome where he spent the rest of his life.

== Years in Rome ==
Always modest and reserved, he usually photographed outdoor scenes, genre pictures or portraits which he sold to artists and tourists. Frederik G. Knudtzon, who wrote one of the most interesting accounts of life among the Scandinavians in Rome in the 19th century, spoke of "the Danish photographer Pietro Boyesen, who was rarely seen, because he was always busy." Boyesen was later able to supplement his income by working as a clerk for the German embassy. He took photographs of animals and plants, as well as pictures depicting the lives of ordinary Italians. Many of his photographs are carte de visite shots of Scandinavians visiting Rome, taken in the yard outside his studio door. Over the door frame, the word "Roma" can be seen, sometimes with the year when the photograph was taken, and on either side of the door there are various flowers, some in pots.

Boyesen had a talent for composition and characterization. In contrast to the staid studio portraits which were so common at the time, Boyesen would have his subjects pose outdoors in intimate Roman settings. By playing with the subjects' clothes and their relationship to the surroundings, Boyesen would produce works presenting a somewhat timid but intimate charm.

He died in Rome on 26 June 1882 and is buried in the non-catholic cemetery.

== Gallery ==
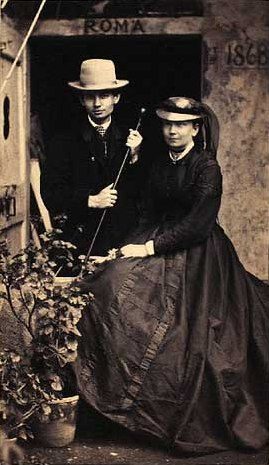
Johan Friderich Bergsøe, Danish artist (1868)

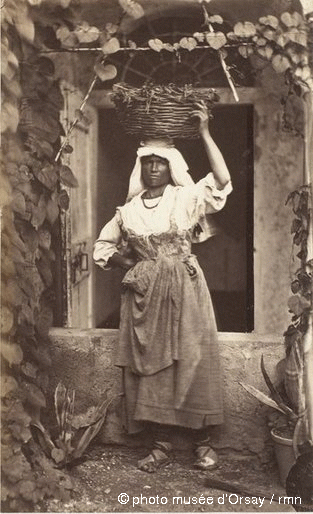
Italian woman with a basket on her head (before 1872)

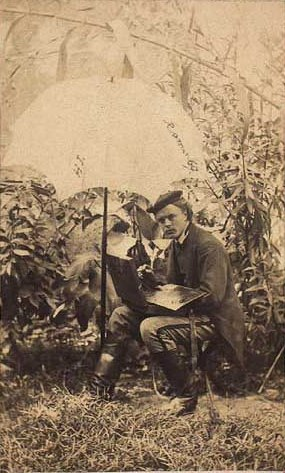
Harald Jerichau, Danish artist (1869)

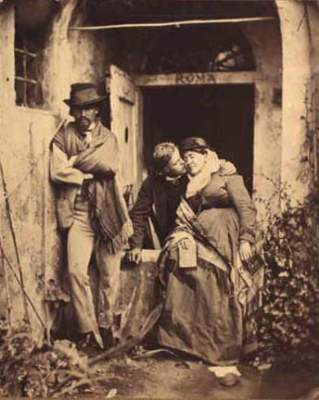
Elisabeth Jerichau-Baumann with her son Harald Jerichau and Pietro Krohn c. 1873 by Pietro Boyesen

== See also ==
- Photography in Denmark
