= Kristen Feilberg =

Danish photographer (1839–1919)

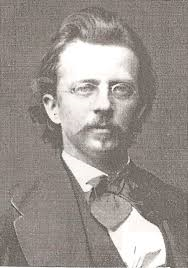
Kristen Feilberg

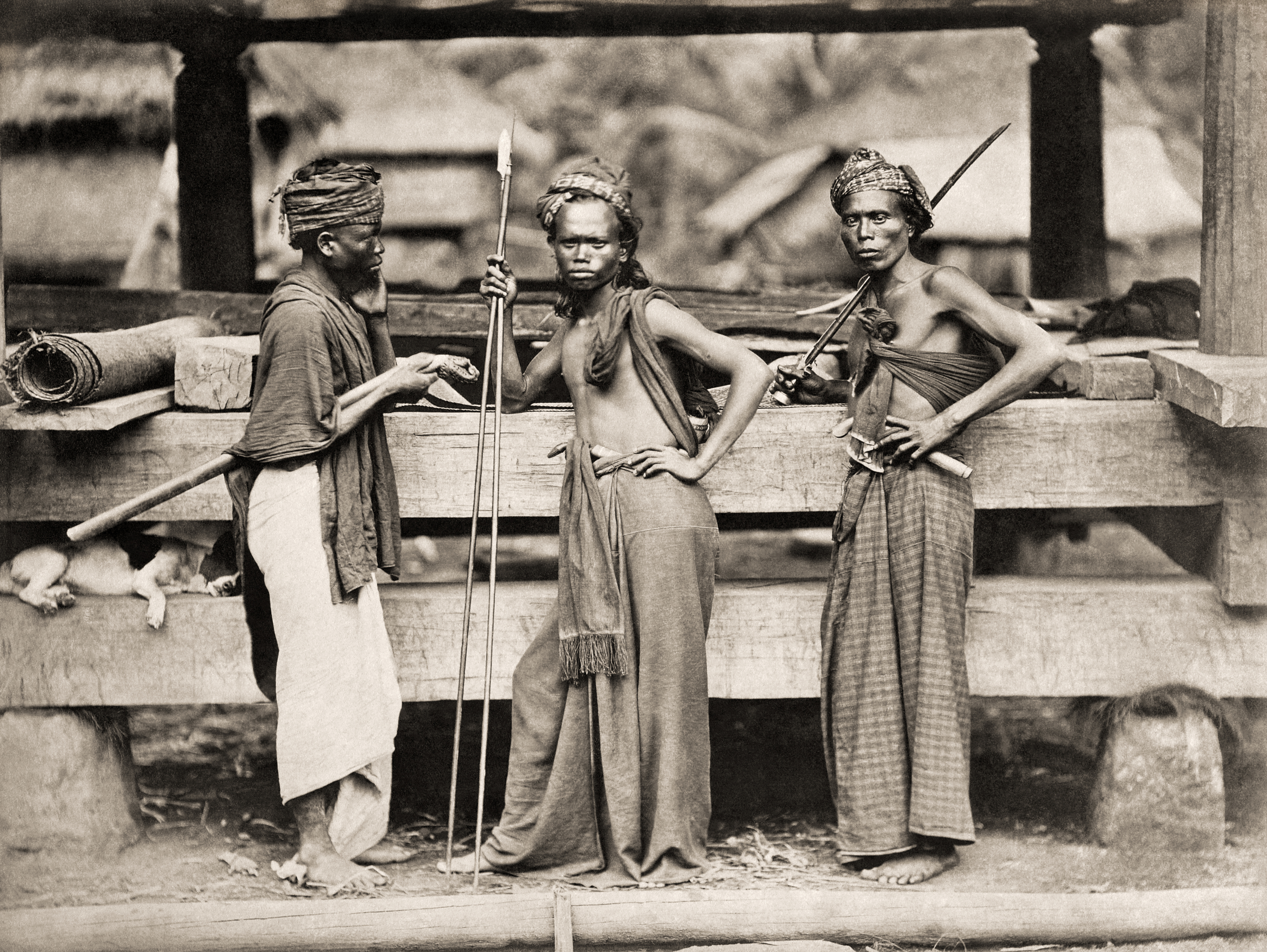
Group of Batak warriors (1870)

Kristen Feilberg or Christen Schjellerup Feilberg (26 August 1839 – 1919) was an early Danish photographer who is known mainly for his images captured far beyond the borders of Denmark. From the 1860s until the 1890s, Feilberg participated in expeditions to Sumatra, Singapore, and Penang. In 1867, he exhibited photos at the Paris World Exposition and around 1870 he joined an expedition to the Batak lands of North Sumatra with the Dutch explorer C. de Haan from which he returned with 45 successful "photogrammes".

== Early life ==
Kristen Feilberg was born on 26 August 1839 in Vester Vedsted near Ribe in the west of Jutland, Denmark. He was the son of Nikolai Laurentius Feilberg, a well-known cleric, and Conradine Antonette Caroline Købke (sister to the painter Christen Købke). He was trained as a photographer.

== Life in the East Indies ==
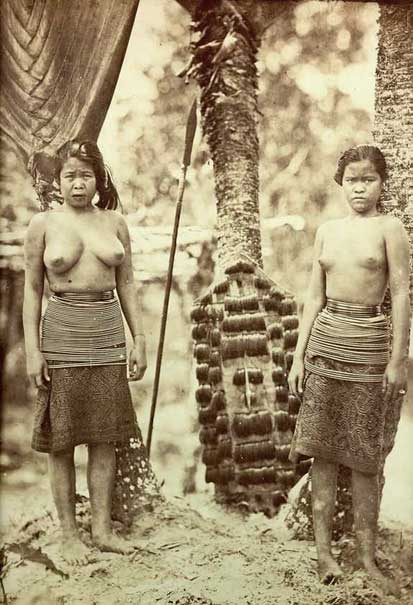
Dayak women from Borneo by Kristen Feilberg (1860s)

After giving up his dream of becoming a painter, he followed his sister to Singapore in 1862 where he worked partly as a tobacco agent and partly as a photographer. In 1864, Feilberg together with August Sachtler took over the photographic studio in Singapore known as Sachtler & Co. Soon afterwards, together with E. Hermann Sachtler, he established a branch office in Penang. In 1867, Feilberg set up his own studio in Penang and, the same year, exhibited 15 views of Penang and Ceylon at the Paris World Exposition. He also produced a 10-part panoramic view of Penang taken from Edinburgh House.

The earliest photographs of eastern Sumatra were taken by Feilberg in 1869. Considered to be of excellent quality, they include integrated group portraits of workers on tobacco plantations such as the one at Arendsburg. They are presented in three albums entitled "Views" at the Royal Tropical Institute. In the late 1860s or early 1870s, Feilberg made a photographic tour of Sumatra. In 1867, he was already in Deli and he returned there in 1880. In September of that year, he joined an expedition with C. de Haan who had been appointed by the Dutch East Indies government to explore the area in the interior around Lake Toba where he photographed the landscape and the Batak people, including the hierarchical princes. Photographing Lake Toba was an achievement akin to the discovery of Lake Victoria in 1858. Despite numerous obstacles, Feilberg was able to record the geography of the region, a feat highly appreciated by de Haan who spoke of the beauty of the landscape.

In the 1880s, he again worked as a photographer in Singapore. He also worked as a buyer for the Danish East Asiatic Company. Some time after 1880, he spent a few years in Denmark where he also worked as a photographer. In 1890, he returned to Singapore where he worked for several photo studios.

He must also have taken part in an expedition to Borneo as evidenced by his photograph (above) of Dayak women from the central area of the island.

Scores of Feilberg's photographs from the collection at the Tropenmuseum in Amsterdam can be accessed on Wikimedia Commons as well as at the Tropenmuseum itself.

Feilberg died in Singapore in 1919.

== Family ==
On 1 May 1865, Feilberg married Emma Alice Mac-Intine, a Scottish Indonesian, with whom he had a daughter, Emma, in George Town, Penang. The mother died shortly after childbirth in March 1866. In 1876, he married Anna Eleonora Sophie Lassen but the marriage was not successful and she returned to Denmark. They had one child, Hjalmar, who was born in 1877 in Medan-Deli, Sumatra, but who died at the age of two in Holbæk.

== Gallery ==
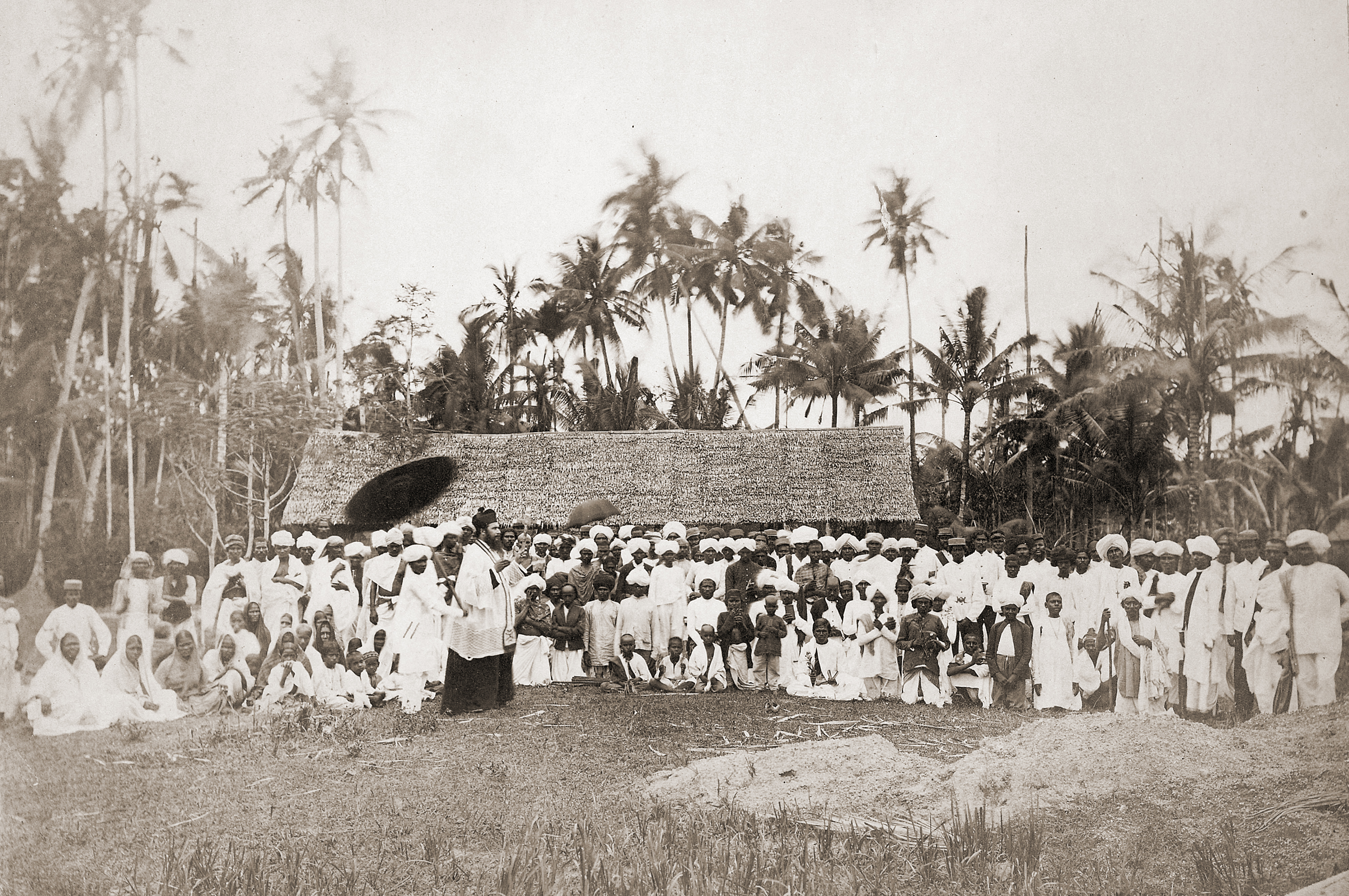
Kling Indians in Penang. Exhibited at the Paris World Exposition in 1867

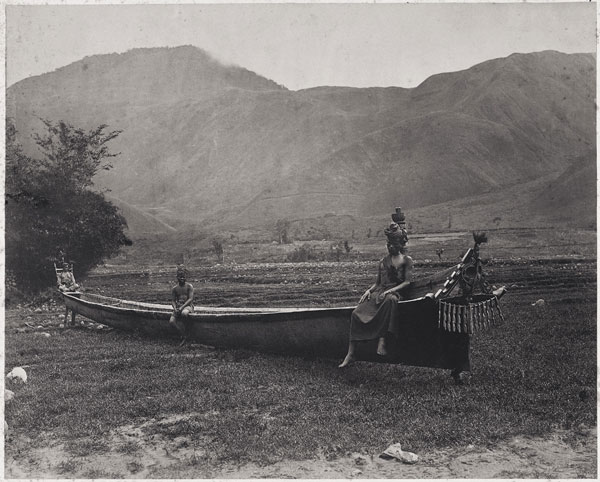
Toba Batak canoe, Sumatra (1870)

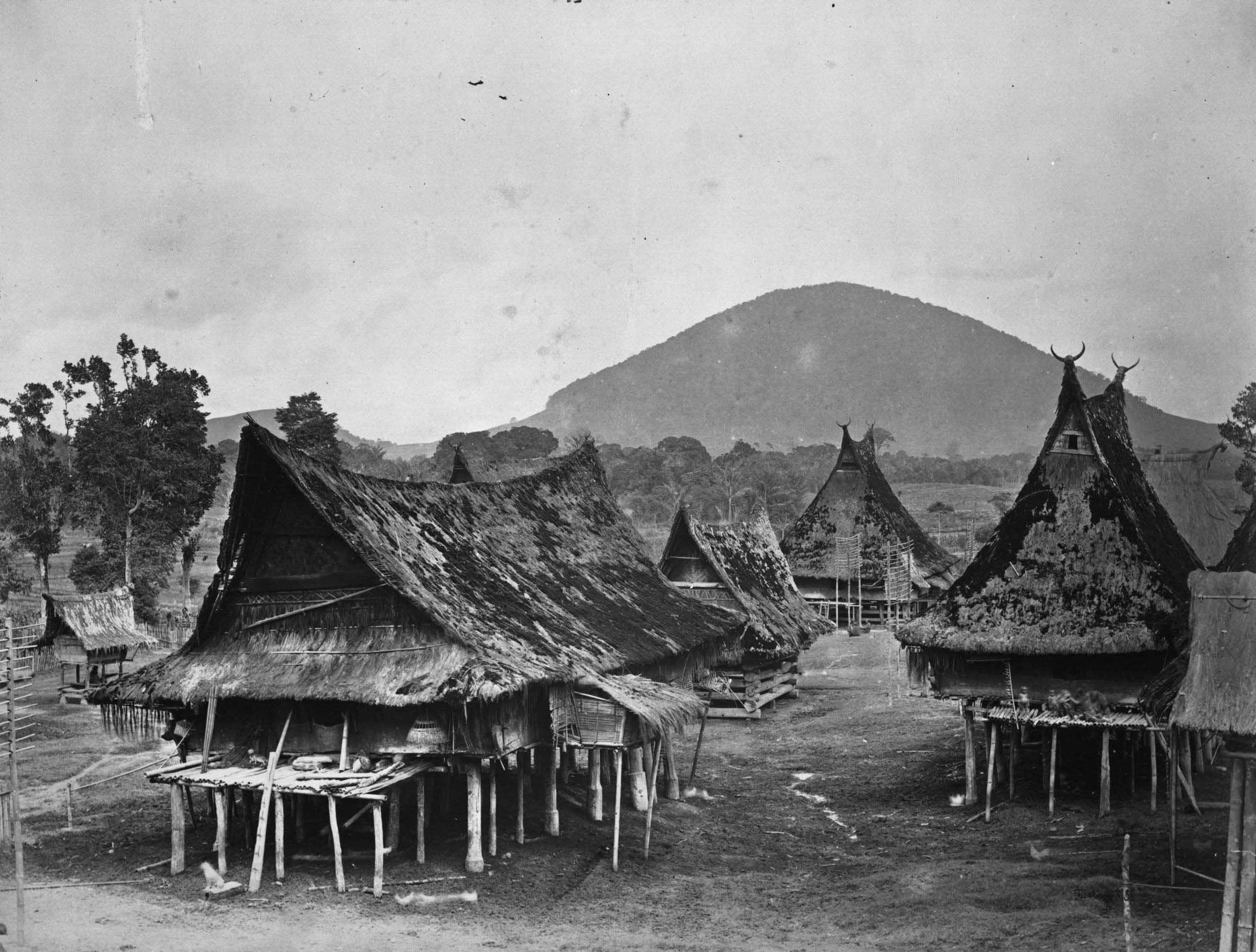
Karo Batak village, North Sumatra (1870)

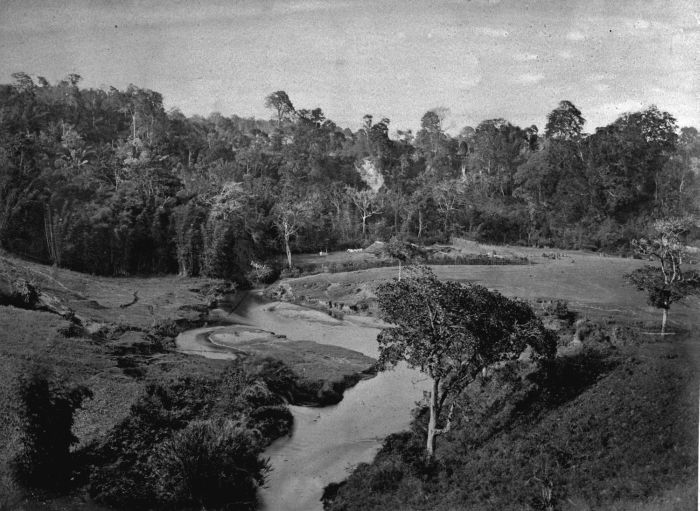
Encampment by a river in the Karo heights, Sumatra (1870)

== See also ==
- Photography in Denmark
