= Claus Bjørn Larsen =

Danish photographer

Claus Bjørn Larsen (born 1963) is a Danish press photographer, now working as a freelance. He gained special recognition in 2000 when he won the World Press Photo of the Year competition for his work in Kosovo.

== Early life ==
Born in 1963 in Holbæk, Denmark, Larsen graduated from high school in 1983 and started freelancing as a photographer. In 1984, he was already volunteering in the darkroom at Ekstra Bladet, a Danish tabloid. From 1986, he apprenticed with BT and in 1989 he attended the Danish School of Journalism in Aarhus, specializing in photojournalism.

== Career ==
He became a staff photographer for Ekstra Bladet in 1989. In 1996, he joined the Danish daily Berlingske Tidende where, in 1999, he was appointed head photographer. In 2009, he left the newspaper to open his own firm, Photobyclausbjoern aps, serving newspapers, magazines and businesses on a freelance basis.

His work has centred on wars and conflicts in Israel, Iraq, the Balkans and Afghanistan as well as on stories from the Soviet Union and the United States. In 2000, in connection with his World Press Photo of the Year award, The Washington Post commented: "The latter award, one of the most sought after in camera journalism, is one of which Larsen is especially proud. His photograph of a wounded Kosovar Albanian refugee, his head swathed in bandages, his eyes fixed in a thousand-mile stare, was among 44,000 entries submitted by shooters around the world. 'I tried to talk to him,' Claus recalled of the day he made the picture, in April of '99, 'but he was in kind of a trance. I took four or five frames, and then he just disappeared.'"

== Awards ==
- 1989: Danish Photographer of the Year
- 1999: Fuji Photographer Denmark
- 1999: World Press Photo of the Year
- 2002: Danish Photographer of the Year

== See also ==
- Photography in Denmark
