= Dansk Fotografisk Forening =

Danish non-profit organization for photographers

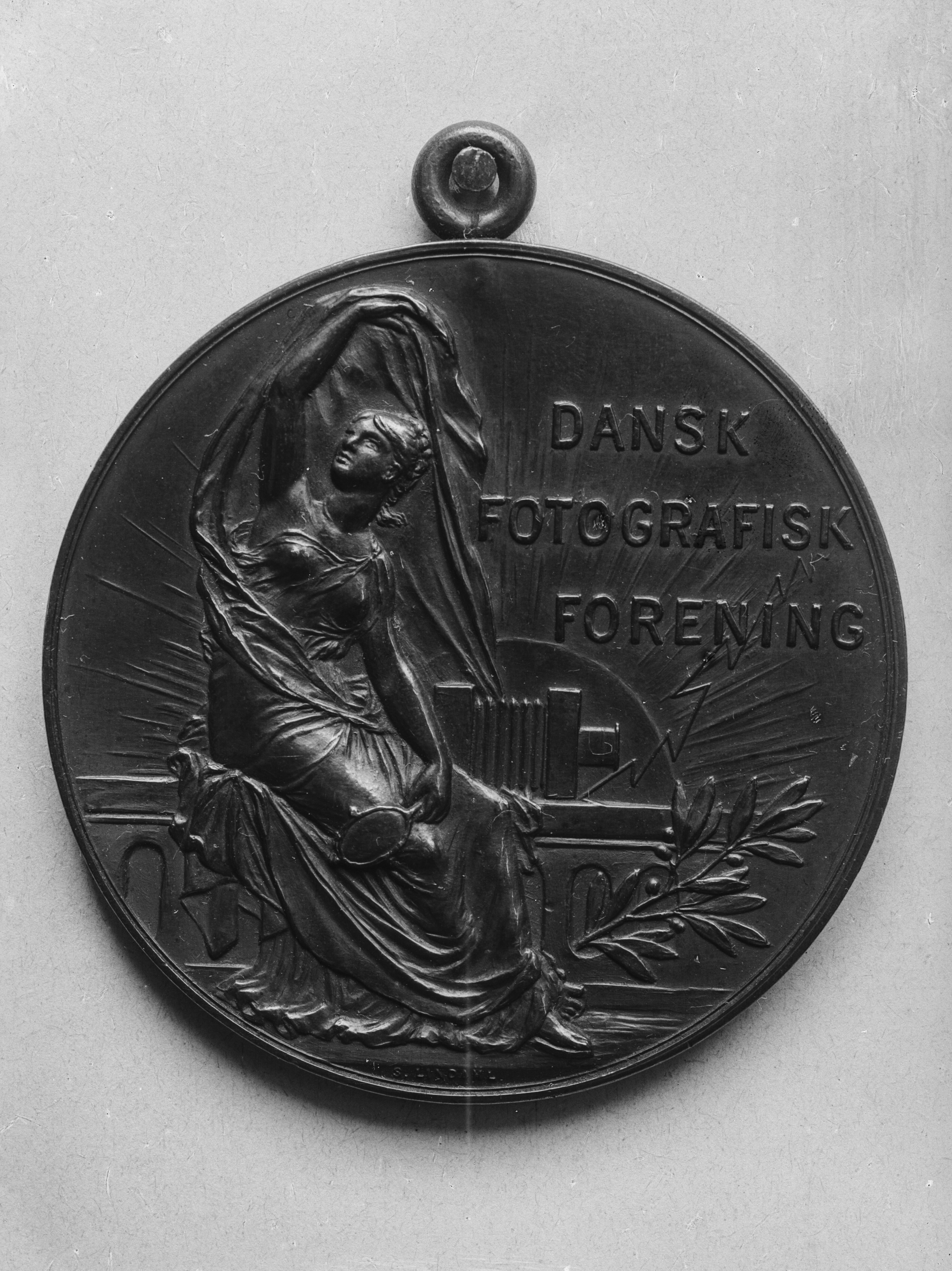
Medal issued by the association.

The Dansk Fotografisk Forening (DFF) or Danish Photographers Association is a non-profit organization for professional photographers. It was founded in 1879.

== Aims and objectives ==
Founded in 1879, the association claims to be the world's oldest organization for professional photographers. Its objective is to support and develop photography, foster cooperation among its members and prevent unfair competition.

These aims are facilitated by means of courses, seminars and mutual cooperation in order to inspire the association's members and keep them informed of the latest techniques and procedures.

The association provides information about the training of new photographers. Members can obtain legal advice thanks to contractual agreements with the Danish Union of Journalists, PresseFotograf Forbundet (Danish Union of Press Photographers) and CopyDan, an organisation promoting access to cultural resources against payment of copyright dues.

The organization also cooperates with the Federation of European Photographers.

== History ==
Dansk Fotografihistorie, published in 2004, provides some interesting details of the association's history:

- In 1879, while the distinction between amateur and professional photography was still rather vague, the Dansk Fotografisk Forening was founded. Court photographer J. Petersen was chairman while Christian Neuhaus, Budtz Müller and many other successful photographers of the 1870s sat on the board.
- In 1880, the association had 87 members. By the turn of the century, there were over 1,000.
- In 1881, the organisation expressed the desire to use photography as a means of recording Denmark's cultural heritage.
- In 1887, Mary Steen was the first woman to become a member of the association. She later became a member of the board.
- In 1889, the association supported the newly founded tourist association, encouraging its members to photograph tourist resorts across the country.
- In 1897, with Peter Raun Fristrup as its spokesman, the association called for a photographic record to be made of Copenhagen, which was undergoing substantial changes.
- In 1909, the organisation's journal Dansk Fotografisk Tidsskrift reported that over the 10 years from 1897 to 1906, the number of photographic firms had risen from 53 to 108 in Copenhagen and from 220 to 263 in the provinces. It also reported that the number of women photographers was rapidly growing.

== Oldest national professional organization ==
Founded in 1879, the association claims to be the oldest national organization for professional photographers in the world. It should however be mentioned that Austria's Photographische Gesellschaft was founded as early as March 1861. Professional Photographers of America, founded in 1880, was created by the members of the Chicago Photographic Association and the National Photographic Association, the latter having been founded in 1868. The Royal Photographic Society in the United Kingdom was founded in 1853 as The Photographic Society "to promote the Art and Science of Photography" but was not specifically for professional photographers (or limited to members from the United Kingdom).

== See also ==
- Photography in Denmark
