= Photography in Denmark =

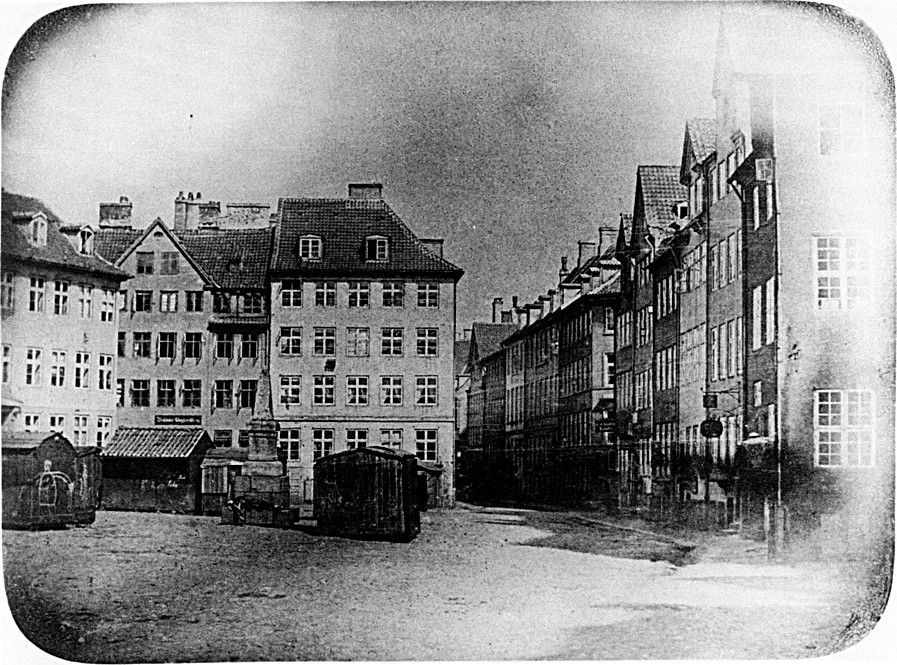
Peter Faber: Ulfeldts Plads (1840), Denmark's oldest photograph on record

In Denmark, photography has developed from strong participation and interest in the very beginnings of the art in 1839 to the success of a considerable number of Danes in the world of photography today.

Pioneers Mads Alstrup and Georg Emil Hansen paved the way for a rapidly growing profession during the last half of the 19th century while both artistic and press photographers have made internationally recognized contributions. Although Denmark was slow to accept photography as an art form, Danish photographers are now increasingly active, participating in key exhibitions around the world.

Among Denmark's most successful contemporary photographers are Jacob Aue Sobol, who gained recognition for portraits of his Greenlandic girlfriend, and Per Bak Jensen, who introduced a new perspective to modern landscape photography. Press photography has prospered too under Jan Grarup and Claus Bjørn Larsen, who have covered wars and conflicts of global importance over the past 20 years.

== History ==
=== Daguerreotypes ===
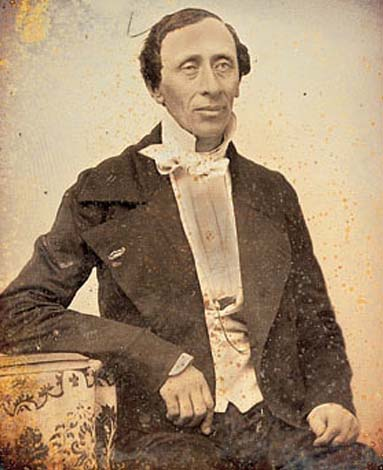
Frederik Ferdinand Petersen: Daguerreotype of Hans Christian Andersen (1847)

Christian Tuxen Falbe, a Danish marine officer, was in Paris in January 1839 on behalf of Crown Prince Frederik when Louis Daguerre revealed the art of daguerreotyping. Falbe informed the Crown Prince of a visit to Daguerre where he had seen some of the very earliest daguerreotypes, explaining how impressed he had been by the new process and how important he thought it would be for art and science in Denmark. Shortly afterwards, he returned to Copenhagen with a camera and a couple of his own daguerreotypes for the Crown Prince who, believing them to be of scientific importance, deposited them with Hans Christian Ørsted, one of Denmark's most prominent scientists. As a result of Ørsted's own interest in photography, the new art took on rapidly: the daguerreotypist Mads Alstrup (1809–76) opened Copenhagen's first photographic studio in 1842; and by 1850 there were over a hundred studios in Copenhagen and many more in the provinces.

The oldest photograph on record in Denmark is credited to Peter Faber (1810–1877), a songwriter and a pioneer in telegraphy. His daguerreotype of Ulfeldts Plads is in the Copenhagen City Museum. The image of the square is in fact reversed left to right, as was normal for daguerreotypes unless a mirror was used together with the camera. Careful analysis of the photograph suggests that it dates back to July 1840. The exposure time of about 15 minutes in sunlight explains why the only figure to be seen is a man sleeping at the foot of the Pillar of Shame towards the left of the picture.

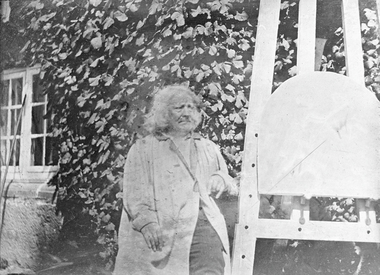
A.C.T. Neubourg: Bertel Thorvaldsen (1840)

Its status in the history of Danish photography is rivalled by a portrait of Bertel Thorvaldsen sitting at an easel outside his studio in the garden of the Royal Danish Academy of Fine Arts at Charlottenborg Palace in Copenhagen. This daguerreotype was taken by the French photographer Aymard Charles Théodore Neubourg, who visited Copenhagen in the summer of 1840. An examination of the circumstances under which it was taken reveals that the date was Sunday, 26 July 1840. It has also been noticed that Thorvaldsen is making the horn sign with what apparently is his left hand although, as a result of the daguerreotype mirror effect, it is actually his right hand. This has been ascribed to the anxiety he must have experienced while facing the new mechanical device which could reveal even the slightest detail.

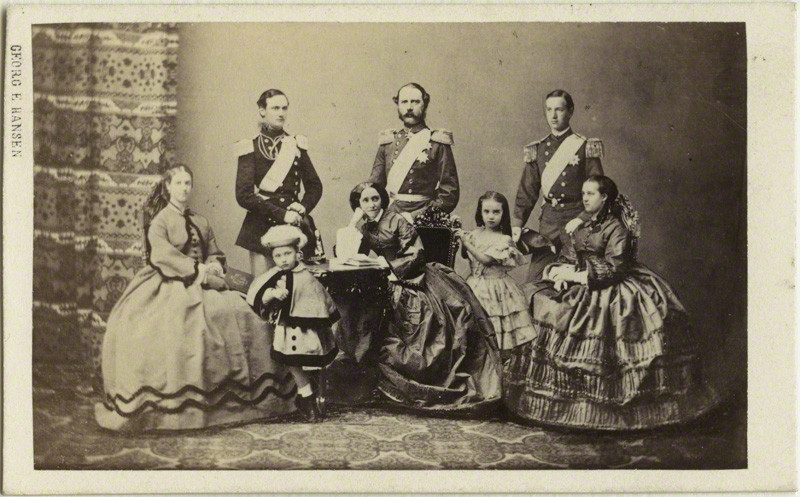
Georg E. Hansen: Christian IX and family (1862)

Several Danes are remembered for their contributions to daguerreotypy. While in Paris in 1848, Anton Melbye (1818–1875), a marine artist, learnt from Daguerre. Rudolph Striegler, Johan Emilius Bogh and Johan Ludvig Ussing were among those who began to specialize in portrait photography opening studios in Copenhagen and the provinces.

Georg Emil Hansen (1833–1891) from Næstved came from a family of photographers. When his father, Carl Christian Hansen, opened a studio in Copenhagen, he decided to open one of his own. He became one of the most respected photographers of his day, with Christian IX of Denmark and the Danish Royal Family as customers in the early 1860s. He also excelled in adopting new techniques. He was the first to use paper prints and to make full-length portrait enlargements. He received awards for his exhibitions in London (1862) and Berlin (1865). In 1867, together with his brother, Niels Christian Hansen, and two other photographers, he set up a photographic firm which later became Hansen, Schou & Weller, suppliers to the royal Danish court.

=== Carte de visite photography ===
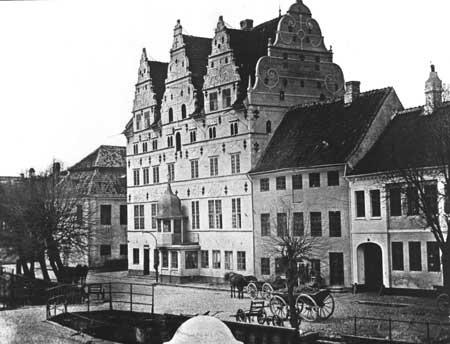
H. Tønnies: Jens Bangs Stenhus in Aalborg (1890)

The technique of carte de visite photography was brought to Denmark by Rudolph Striegler in 1860. It spread rapidly and by the 1870s provided a cheap and attractive alternative to portrait painting for photographers such as Ludvig Grundtvig (1836–1901) and Adolph Lønborg (1835–1916) in Copenhagen, and Heinrich Tønnies (1856–1903) who opened a studio in Aalborg.

Heinrich Tønnies (1825–1903) remains to date one of the premier CDV photographers of Denmark. In June 1856 he began his photographic career as a partner under C. Fritsche in Aalborg and by December of the same year he bought his partner's share of the business and struck out with a studio under his own name. By 1861, Tönnies' business boomed requiring a larger studio and the hiring of assistants, and by 1870 he became a Danish citizen. Ultimately, his family business spanned three-generations and 75 years. The breadth of his photographic products included: Daguerreotypes, calotypes, pannotypes, photo-lithography, stereoscopy, ambrotypes, CDVs, and medallions. It is believed that he produced no less than 75,000 CDVs, many ordered in relation to a large wave of emigration from Nordjylland to North America. Owing to the poverty of Denmark's Vendsyssel region, local demands for inexpensive CDVs persisted in Aalborg right up until World War I, making Tönnies' studio one of the last to produce CDVs in Denmark.

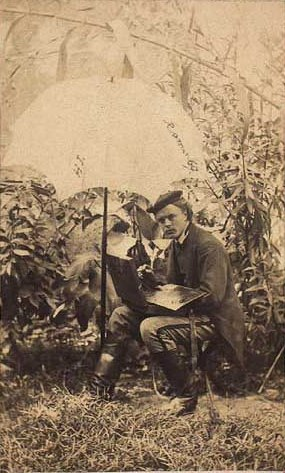
Harald Jerichau by Pietro Boyesen (1869)

Pietro Boyesen (1819–1882) was a Danish photographer who spent most of his professional life in Rome. Boyesen had a talent for composition and characterization. In contrast to the boring studio portraits which were so common at the time, Boyesen would have his subjects pose outdoors in intimate Roman settings. By playing with the subjects clothes and their relationship to the surroundings, Boyesen would produce works presenting a somewhat timid but intimate charm.

Frederikke Federspiel (1839–1913) was one of the first female photographers in Denmark. At the age of 35, she received training in photography from her family in Hamburg, Germany, where her uncle, Poul Friedrich Lewitz, her aunt and cousins were all photographers. In 1876, when registering her business in Aalborg, she became one of the first officially recognized female photographers in Denmark when she gave her profession as "Photographin", a German word which clearly shows that she was a woman. Specializing in portraits, she also became one of the earliest female members of the Dansk Fotografisk Forening in 1883. One of the first to experiment with magnesium powder for flash, she installed electric lamps in her studio when electricity came to Aalborg in 1901.

Kristen Feilberg (1839–1919) stands as another Danish photographer known mainly for his images captured far beyond the borders of Denmark. From the 1860s until the 1890s, Feilberg participated in expeditions to Sumatra, Singapore, and Penang. In 1867, he exhibited photos at an exhibition in Paris and in 1870 he joined an expedition to the Batak lands of East Sumatra, where he successfully recorded scores of ethnographic images.

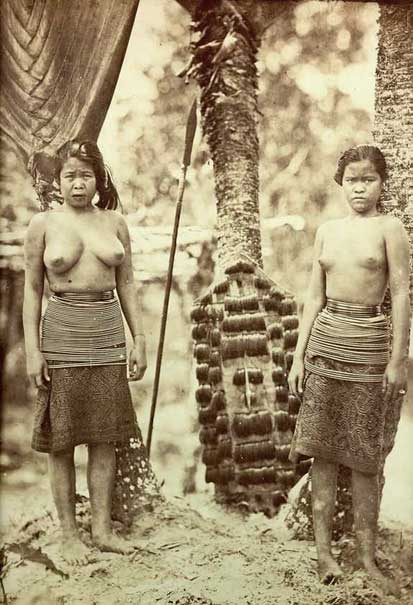
Dayak women from Borneo by Kristen Feilberg (1860s)

Christian Hedemann (1852–1932) counts as among the earliest Danish photographers who emigrated the farthest distance. Though educated in Denmark, he left Copenhagen in 1878 and settled in Hawaii. Primarily occupied as a mechanical engineer at the Hana Sugar Plantation, Island of Maui, and later as a technical manager at the Honolulu Iron Works, as an avid amateur photographer he helped found the Hawaiian Camera Club (1889–1893). He became an American citizen in 1903 and in 1909 accepted an appointment as Danish Consul. His remarkable photographs of the Hawaiian royal family and native social elites remain as some of the earliest images available of pre-annexed Hawaii.

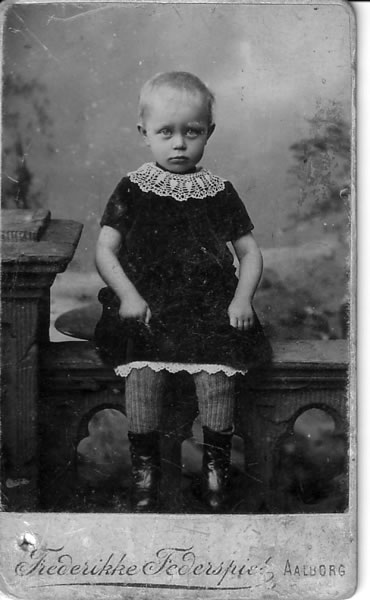
Frederikke Federspiel: portrait (c. 1890)

Mary Steen (1856–1939) was a successful photographer in Copenhagen, pioneering indoor photography with pictures of families inside their own homes. Later, as court photographer, she not only photographed the royal family in Denmark but also spent some time in London where she photographed Queen Victoria. She did much to improve working conditions for women and her example encouraged many women to become professional photographers.

Benedicte Wrensted (1859–1949) was a notable Danish female photographer, who emigrated to the US in 1894. Wrensted learned her craft from her maternal aunt, Charlotte Borgen, and for a time in the 1880s operated a studio on Torvet 8, in Horsens, Denmark. Much of her photographic career is anchored to her studio in Pocatello, a small town in southeastern Idaho, where she took photographs of the local inhabitants and recorded the growth of the town. Perhaps her most famous work remains her documentary photographs of the Shoshone Great Basin Native Americans which are considered of great anthropological importance. Wrensted became a U.S. citizen in 1912, at age 53, and in the same year ended her career as a photographer. Many of her Native American images are preserved at the Smithsonian Institution and National Archives.

Ludvig Luplau operated in Copenhagen until he emigrated to the U.S.A (circa 1870), where he opened a photography studio in Chicago. His CDV backmarks stated "Ludvig Luplau from Copenhagen," and the Chicago city business directories listed him at a variety of locations in the 1870s-90s. His stereoview backmark advertising claimed Luplau & Co., of 80 Fourth Street, specialized in both outdoor photography and stereoscopic interiors. Louis Laplau, his son, continued in photography beginning in the 1890s.

Peter Elfelt (1866–1931), who served his photography apprenticeship in 1893 in Hillerød with Carl Rathsack, soon opened a studio of his own together with his two brothers. His work was widely recognized with the result that, in 1900, he was given the title of Photographer to the Royal Danish Court. He took not only a large number of portraits but also landscapes across Denmark. He later became a major name in cinematography too.

=== Other techniques ===
A number of other techniques developed in parallel with the use of daguerreotypes. The ambrotype, using collodium to produce a positive image on glass, and the pannotype, also collodium-based, were both used in Denmark from around 1855. Negative-based paper prints, used from the beginning of the 1850s, were produced on salt paper until around 1857 when salt was replaced by albumen. Collodion emulsion chloride paper was used from 1865 and in 1880 gelatin emulsion paper was introduced.

=== Growing popularity ===
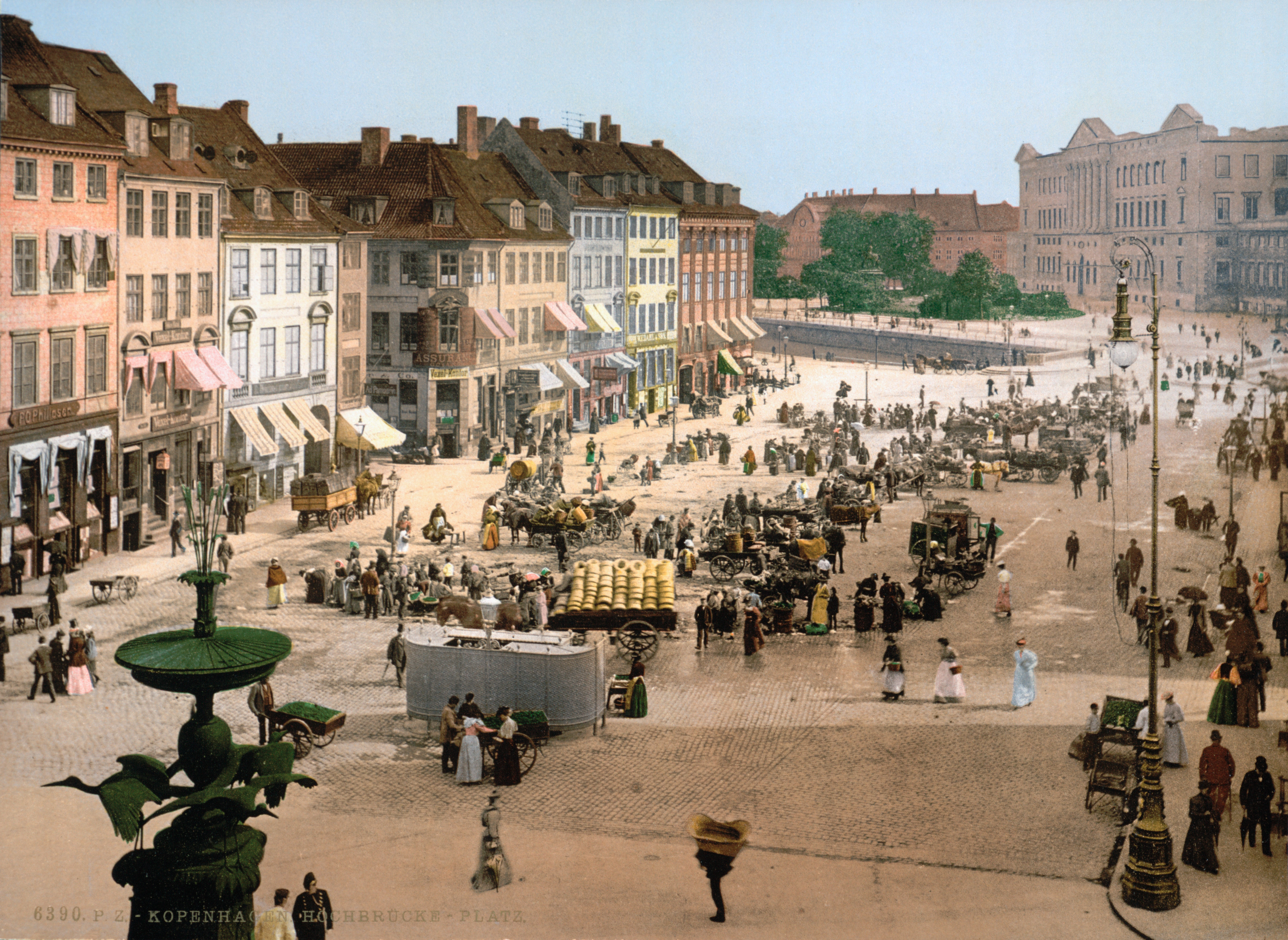
PhotoChrom postcard: Højbro Plads, Copenhagen c. 1895. Unknown author

Thanks to the increasing availability of simpler techniques, amateur photography gained popularity at the beginning of the 20th century. Sigvart Werner and Julius Møller were among the many who were influenced by the pictorialist trend, concentrating on pictorial landscape and genre photography.

From the 1890s, the Detroit Publishing Company used the Photochrom technique based on chromolithography to produce a large number of colour postcards, many of European cityscapes. In their collection, there are several views of Copenhagen taken between 1890 and 1900.

Benefitting from the advent of postcards, Mary Willumsen (1884–1961) photographed women in scanty clothing or nude at the Helgoland beach facility in Copenhagen. Between 1916 and 1920, she took many such photographs which she sold at a nearby kiosk. The operation was discontinued when the police began to take an interest. Many of the compositions are now considered to have considerable artistic merit.

== Press and documentary photography ==
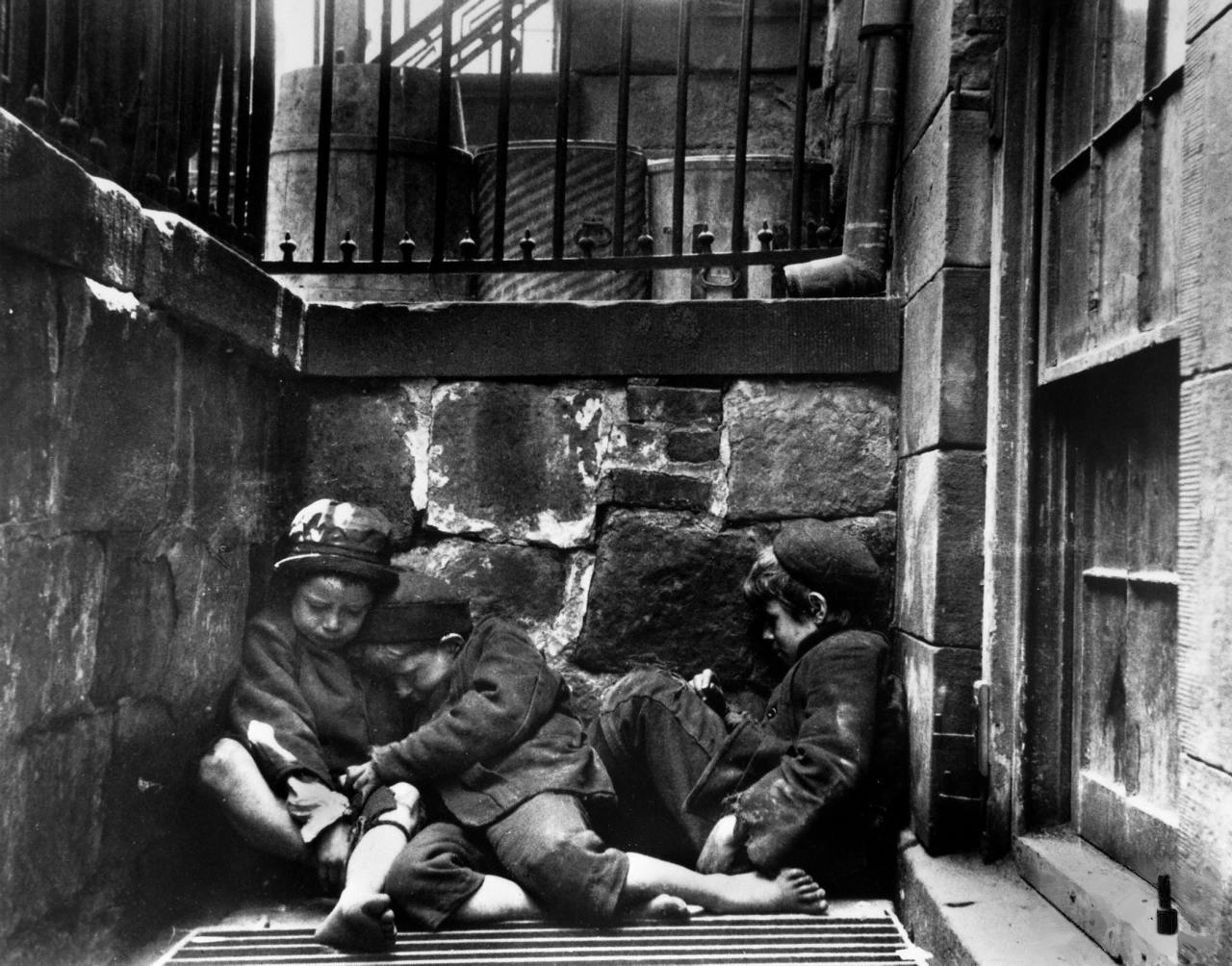
Jacob Riis, Children sleeping in Mulberry Street (1890)

The Danish Union of Press Photographers (Pressefotografforbundet) is claimed to be the world's first national organization for newspaper photographers. It was founded in 1912 in Copenhagen by six press photographers. Today it has over 800 members.

One of the earliest and most successful press photographers was Danish-American Jacob Riis (1849–1914) who campaigned for social reform in the United States. Essentially a journalist, he took up photography only after he had emigrated to America. A prominent user of flash, he was able to publish indoor scenes of the slums of New York City, contributing to the implementation of "model tenements". He is now regarded as a pioneer in photography.

While some Danish newspapers started to include photographs in the 1890s, it was only in the 1950s that press photography was introduced throughout the country. Taking the French-based international photographic bureau Magnum as a model, Jesper Høm, Gregers Nielsen and others set up Delta Photos, a group designed to support journalistic photography.

Delta Photos was dissolved in 1972 but other organizations such as Morten Bo's Ragnarok and Henrik Saxgren's 2. Maj sought to promote more clearly defined social and political objectives. Some photographers, such as Viggo Rivad and Krass Clement, chose instead to become freelancers.

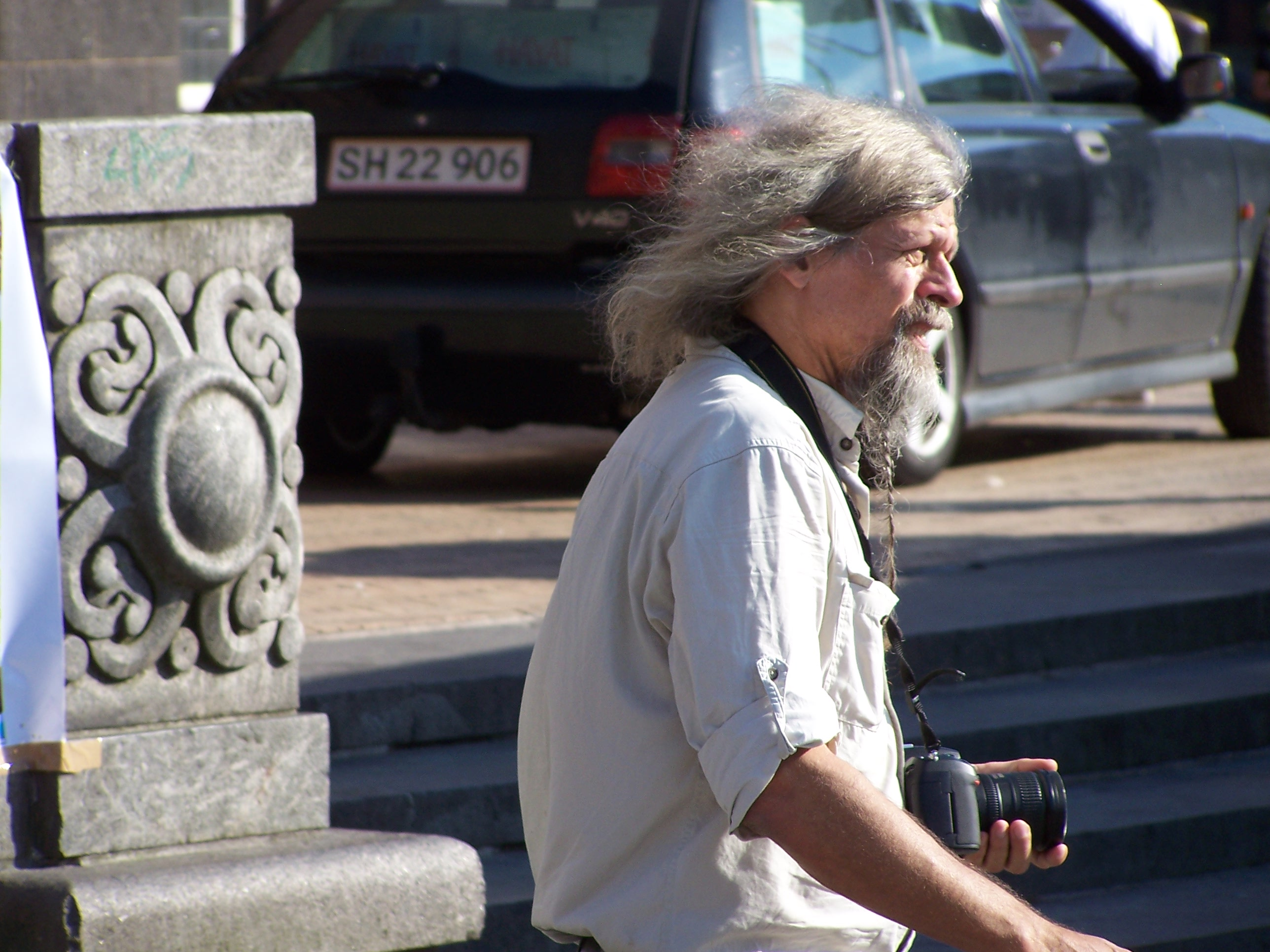
Jacob Holdt

In the 1970s, Jacob Holdt (b. 1947) spent a number of years in the United States where he photographed scenes of the socially disadvantaged across the country. In his book American Pictures (1977), a worldwide success, he contrasted these with photographs of the American elite, hoping to provide a basis for social reform.

Today Danish press photographers are as active as ever. Jan Grarup, in particular, has covered wars and conflicts around the globe over the past 20 years, earning prestigious awards at home and abroad. Claus Bjørn Larsen, also working as a war photographer, won the World Press Photo of the Year award in 1999 for his work in Kosovo.

Documentary photography has also flourished outside the press. As an example, Jette Bang (1914–1964) was fascinated by Greenland and the Greenlanders. From 1936, she took over 12,000 black-and-white photographs of the country and its inhabitants, showing how close to nature people lived.

== Art or science? ==
P.S. Kroyer: Summer evening on Skagen's beach (1899), inspired by photograph.

Since the very beginning, Danes have argued about the precise place of photography in society. In 1839, Crown Prince Frederik deposited Falbe's daguerreotypes with Ørsted, the secretary of the Royal Danish Academy of Sciences and Letters, despite the fact that Daguerre, the inventor, was an artist. In 1842, the artist Johan Frederik Møller was refused a grant from the Royal Danish Academy of Fine Arts for studying photography in France on the grounds that it was not an art. Photographers came within neither the scope of the Academy of Sciences nor that of the Academy of Fine Arts but were regarded as manual workers.

The confusion continued until the end of the 19th century when artists began to use photography as an aid to painting. Notable examples are Peder Severin Krøyer, Jens Ferdinand Willumsen and Laurits Andersen Ring who used photography to obtain more detail and realism in their paintings.

With the advent of photographic societies such as Danske Kamera Piktorialister (Danish Camera Pictorialists) in the 1930s, there was increasing pressure from activists such as H. B. J. Cramer to have photography recognized as an art form. Indeed, the movement continued right up to the 1970s. A counter-movement to pictorialism, the 1920s' Neue Sachlichkeit was slow to reach Denmark but surfaced in 1948 when Keld Helmer-Petersen published his abstract colour studies in 122 Colour Photographs.

Apart from the 20 rather amateurish artistic photography events arranged by Aage Remfeldt between 1946 and 1976 at Charlottenborg, Denmark had few photographic exhibitions until the 1960s. The situation improved in 1963 when Jesper Høm arranged an exhibition at the Danish Museum of Art & Design with photographers from New York City, Moscow and Paris. Another positive influence was Keld Helmer-Petersen's book Fragments of a City with photographs of fire escapes and artistically silhouetted cranes taken while he was a student at Chicago's Institute of Design, some of which were published in the magazine Perspectiv.

In the winter of 1968–1969, Jens Juncker-Jensen went even further with an excellent exhibition Fotografiet som udtryksmiddel (Photography as a means of expression) for which he drew the very best material from the few photographic books of the time, attracting not only professional and amateur photographers but also architects and television producers. It provided a basis for six TV programmes over the following months. There was, however, little real discussion of photography as an art form.

In the early 1970s, under the influence of the United States where photography had become an academic discipline, exhibitions such as New American Photography in Copenhagen's Bella Center presented top artistic photographers of the 1950s and 1960s including Harry Callahan, Jerry Uelsmann and Diane Arbus. This was followed in 1973 by the opening of Galleriet for Creativ Fotografi (Gallery for Creative Photography) in Copenhagen, to be followed in 1977 by the IMAGE gallery in Aarhus which encouraged experimental photography. Subsequent exhibitions involved the landscape photographer Kirsten Klein, the pioneers of staged photography Nanna Bisp Büchert and Lis Steincke, as well as the magic realist Per Bak Jensen.

In the 1990s, after Per Bak Jensen had joined the teaching staff at the Royal Academy in Copenhagen, it was clear that photography had been accepted as an art form. As evidence, in October 2004, for the very first time, a number of the academy's students and graduates presented their photographs at an exhibition in Copenhagen's Galleri Asbæk under the common title ”Eye of the Beholder – et blik på portrættet”.

== Contemporary photographers ==
Recognizing the growing status of photography as an art form, artists such as Richard Winther, Stig Brøgger, Jytte Rex, Peter Brandes and Ane Mette Ruge have actively contributed to its development. On the digital front, younger artists like Lisa Rosenmeier have combined classical techniques of art and photography with digitized forms of expression.

Some of Denmark's more widely recognized contemporary photographers are:

- Rigmor Mydtskov (1925–2010) was a Danish court photographer who is remembered both for her portraits of artists performing in Danish theatres but also for her many portraits of Queen Margrethe and other members of the Danish royal family. Realizing that people in such positions tend to act as if masked, she sought to portray the person behind the mask, although she often succeeded in maintaining a little of the secrecy. As a portrait photographer, she was gentle, intuitive and confident. Her life's work is a result of a constant, concentrated effort.
- Per Bak Jensen (born 1949) seeks to capture timelessness or "the being of places" in his work. A pioneer of modern landscape photography, his topics are unusual: a field of corn stubble, thistles, or twigs lying in the snow. Much of his recent work includes photographs from Iceland and Greenland, some with stark images of minerals and rocks. While he is extremely attentive to angle, light and exposure, he never manipulates his photographs once they have been taken. He has successfully exhibited across Denmark for many years and more recently in New York, London and Paris.
- Krass Clement (born 1946) graduated as a film director but soon turned to still photography, publishing his first book Skygger af øjeblikke (Shadows of the Moment) in 1978. He has since become an active documentary photographer, focusing on people from both Denmark and elsewhere. His earlier work is black and white but since 2000 he has also worked with colour.
- Kirsten Klein (born 1945) studied portrait and museum photography before specializing in landscapes. Her black-and-white photographs often make use of older techniques such as cyanotype and platinum printing. Concentrating on landscapes, she conveys a sensitive, poetic and often melancholic mood. Since 1976, she has lived on the Danish island of Mors where she has photographed the ever-changing countryside and coastline.
- Steen Brogaard (born 1961) began his career in Copenhagen in 1984 photographing Greenpeace meetings and demonstrations. In 1987, while in the United States, he was contacted by a Danish gossip magazine where he learnt the technique of photographing celebrities. Since the late 1990s, he has been a court photographer, following the lives of the Crown Prince, the Crown Princess and their family. This has allowed him to travel widely in China and the Far East. One of his recent interests is Denmark and the Danes, examining "what they do best in a great little country".
- Asger Carlsen (born 1973), who now lives in New York, has had considerable success with the cleverly doctored black-and-white images presented in his book Wrong. Everyday scenes suddenly become depictions of a surreal alternate reality, bordering on hallucinations. Carlsen explains his approach as "an expression of never really belonging anywhere."
- Astrid Kruse Jensen (born 1975, educated in the Netherlands and Scotland) specializes in photographs taken at night which evoke the zone between reality and imagination. Carefully combining the effects of artificial light with the surrounding darkness, she creates mysterious images of lakes, swimming pools and solitary figures in the twilight. Since 2003, she has participated in key exhibitions in Denmark and elsewhere.
- Jacob Aue Sobol (born 1976) studied at Fatamorgana, the Danish School of Art Photography. His first book Sabine presents vivid pictures of his Greenlandic girlfriend and the remote village where she lives. For his series on the Gomez Brito family from Quiché in Guatemala, he won the 2005 World Press Photo prize for Daily Life Stories. Commenting on his book I, Tokyo, Miranda Gavin appreciates how "the sensitivity of his approach shines through the work and sets him apart as one of a new generation of photographers with the ability to allow eroticism and danger to seep through his images without becoming sordid or clichéd."
- Klaus Thymann (born 1974) lives in London. His HYBRIDS project was published in 2007 and featured documentary photography with a global perspective exploring peculiar hybrid cultures around the planet, such as Snow Polo in St. Mortiz, Gay Rodeo in LA, Underwater Striptease in Chile, Underground Gardening in Tokyo and more.

== Photographic museums and galleries in Denmark ==
- National Museum of Photography, the Royal Library, Copenhagen.
- Fotografisk Center, Copenhagen
- Annexone.org, Copenhagen
- Danish Museum of Photographic Art, Odense.
- Phototek Esbjerg, Esbjerg
- Galleri Image, Aarhus
- Danmarks Fotomuseum, Herning

== See also ==
- History of photography
- Women in photography
- Danish art

== Bibliography ==
- Allard, Alexander Sr. Heinrich Tönnies: Cartes-de-Visite Photographer Extraordinaire, New York: Camera/Graphic Arts Ltd, 1978. ISBN 0-918696-06-2. (dual English/Danish text) (in Danish)
- Alland, Alexander Sr. Jacob A. Riis: Photographer and Citizen, Millerton, NY: Aperture, 1993. ISBN 0-89381-527-6
- Davis, Lynn Ann with Nelson Foster. A Photographer in the Kingdom: Christian J. Hedemann's early images of Hawai'i, Honolulu: Bishop Museum, 1987. ISBN 0-930897-36-6
- Ejstrud, Jannie Uhre. "Denmark". In John Hannavy, ed., Encyclopedia of Nineteenth-Century Photography, London: Routledge, 2007; ISBN 0-415-97235-3, vol. 1.
- Engelstoft, Jesper and Henning Henningsen, ed., Dansk Vestindien i Gamle Billeder, Copenhagen: Dansk Vestindisk Selskab, 1967. (dual English/Danish text) (in Danish)
- Hansen, Tove. Kvindelige fotografer i Danmark før 1900. Fund og Forskning, Bind 29, 1990. pp. 65–90. (in Danish)
- Hassner, Rune. Jacob A. Riis: Reporter med kamera i New York slum. Stockholm: P.A. Norstedt & Söner forlag, 1970. (in Swedish)
- Haugsted, Ida. Christian Tuxen Falbe and the Pioneer Daguerreotypists in Denmark. History of Photography, Vol. 14, No. 2, April–June 1990, pp. 195–207.
- Hornung, Peter and Bramsen, Ludvig. Danske Fotografier, Fr Og Nu: Ny Samling Med 394 Fotos ..., Copenhagen: 2000. Forlaget Palle Fogtdal, ISBN 87-7248-535-3 (in Danish)
- Kunstreich, Jan S. Frühe Photographen in Schleswig-Holstein, Heide: Westholsteinische Verlagsanstalt Boyens, (Kleine Schleswig-Holstein-Bücher), 1985. ISBN 3-8042-0299-3 (in German)
- Ochsner, Bjørn. Fotografer i og fra Danmark til og med år 1920 I-II, Copenhagen: Bibliotekscentralens forlag, 1986. (in Danish)
- Ochsner, Bjørn. Fotografiet i Danmark, 1840–1940: en kulturhistorisk billedbog, Copenhagen: Foreningen for Boghåndværk, 1974. (in Danish)
- Ochsner, Bjørn. Fotografier af H.C. Andersen, Odense: Udgivet Af H.C. Andersens Hus, 1957. (in Danish)
- Poulsen, Henrik. Det rette udseende – fotografernes H.C. Andersen. Hans Reitzels Forlag, 1996. (in Danish)
- Sandbye, Mette (ed). Dansk fotografihistorie. Copenhagen: Gyldendal, 2004. ISBN 978-87-00-39586-2 (in Danish)
- Scherer, Joanna Cohen. A Danish Photographer of Idaho Indians: Benedicte Wrensted, Tulsa: University of Oklahoma Press, 2006. ISBN 978-0-8061-3684-4.
- Thage, Tove. Fotografernes H.C. Andersen. Copenhagen: Høst & Søn, GB-Forlagene A/S, 2007. (in Danish)
- Thornit, Per. 1864: den danske soldat i samtidige fotografier, Viborg: Bent Carlsens Forlag, 1978. ISBN 87-85216-42-9 (in Danish)
