= Mary Willumsen =

Mary Birgitte Cecilie Magdalene Willumsen (13 July 1884 – 25 October 1961) was a Danish photographer who, as early as 1916, sold postcards with photographs of women in scanty clothing or nude postures taken at Copenhagen's Helgoland beach establishment. She discontinued her work when the police began to show interest in kiosks selling nude photographs. Her work is now considered to have considerable artistic value.

== Early life ==
Mary Willumsen came from a working-class family in the Copenhagen district of Valby. While young, she learnt the meaning of hard work. As a seven-year-old, she helped her mother and brother to deliver newspapers, earning a little more for the family. After she was confirmed in 1899, she worked as a seamstress at the Magasin du Nord department store. In 1910, she married Harald Axel Larsen, a house painter and photographer who died in 1913.

== Background ==
From the beginning of the 20th century, Danish photographers started to show interest in sports and bathing facilities where they could photograph women in flimsy clothing. Helgoland, a popular bathing establishment on the outskirts of Copenhagen, attracted a number of photographers including Peter Elfelt, Holger Damgaard, Julius Aagaard and Sophus Juncker-Jensen. In 1914, Mary Willumsen also started to visit the establishment.

== Postcard photography ==
Ahead of the interest in female nude photography which increased in the 1920s, Mary Willumsen's photographs from 1916 to 1920, though carefully posed, appear more spontaneous than her earlier work. Portraying groups of smiling schoolgirls to grown women in different states of undress, her pictures have been described as unique in their intimacy and spontaneity, reflecting the personal appreciation Willumsen had for her subjects. To some extent, her photographs are inspired by German and French nudist postcards. Uniquely, in her photographs, women's faces are covered, never revealing their identity.

Much of the information we have about Mary Willumsen comes from a police report which was drafted after she was arrested in 1920 for producing and selling illegal postcards. According to the report, Willumsen — who had not been trained as a photographer — had permission from the bathing establishment's inspector to photograph "those customers who wished to be photographed." As time went by, a certain Mr Brix, the owner of the nearby Scala Book Kiosk, asked Willumsen to take some bathing pictures for him to sell. Some of Helgoland's customers agreed to be photographed for the venture. Some of her photographs were published in Vore Damer, a women's magazine, but without any identification.

Initially, Willumsen's photographs were of women in bathing suits or underclothes. However, as interest grew, Brix persuaded her to take nude pictures too, though Willumsen explained that she "never attempted to create pictures of an erotic or lewd character". The ten or so women she used as models came from quite different backgrounds: everything from actresses to house maids and even some who were more associated with "loose living". As her business expanded, she extended her sales to kiosks in Istegade and the Circus Garden in the centre of Copenhagen. Willumsen estimated that she was producing about 1,200 photographs a month, selling them at 25 øre each.

== Police involvement ==
In 1919, the Copenhagen police began to investigate all the city's kiosks to see if they were dealing in erotic photographs. As a result, in 1920 they arrested Mary Willumsen for overstepping the law. More than 1,000 of her postcards were seized from the Scala Kiosk in just one month and a total of 15,000 were confiscated as evidence. A further 10,000 were stopped on their way to Germany, showing the scale of the operation. The investigation became known as the "Aga Case" as it involved postcards sold through the mail order company "Aga Foto". The courts finally determined that the postcards were in fact legal and returned most of them, dropping the charges.

Nevertheless, as a result of the police investigation, Willumsen immediately stopped producing postcards.

== Later life ==
Mary Willumsen never returned to photography. Instead she made a living from buying antiques and selling them to well-to-do customers in Hellerup and Gentofte.

== Assessment ==
Mary Willumsen occupies a special place in the history of photography. Some of her photographs are admittedly rather conventional examples of "daring" shots of women in spicy positions. But in others, she reproduces informal situations at the bathing establishment. The women's curves stand out against the plain geometry of the surrounding woodwork or we see the wave-like rhythm of women lying on the surrounding sand dunes. Even if Willumsen's postcards were sold at the Scala kiosk to those looking for pornography, the Helgoland bathing establishment seems to have offered a level of openness where women could act naturally without behaving erotically. The resulting photographs show that freedom of expression is more important than eroticism.

== See also ==
- Photography in Denmark
- Nude photography
- French postcard
