= Per Bak Jensen =

Danish landscape photographer

Per Bak Jensen (born 22 April 1949) is a Danish landscape photographer. His desolate images of nature or industrial sites often convey an almost metaphysical impression. His unusual subjects include corn stubble, twigs in the snow or a few isolated rocks. Always attentive to angle, light and exposure, he never manipulates his photographs once they have been taken.

== Early life ==
After completing his schooling in Copenhagen, in 1973 Bak Jensen married Susanne Høj, the daughter of photographer Ebbe Høj. He had many different jobs until, at the age of 30, he began to study at the Royal Danish Academy of Fine Arts (1980–1986). From 1987, he worked as a lector at the Academy in the phototechnical laboratory. He was the first graduate from the Academy to use photography as his only art form.

== Career ==
He embarked on his career with the exhibition Den gådefulde by (The Enigmatic City) at Copenhagen's Galleri Gari in 1988, simultaneously publishing the series in book form. The black-and-white photographs, taken with a large-format camera, cover the city's parks, cemeteries and areas around museums and monuments. But the city he presents appears empty, distant and alienated. The photographs have an almost metaphysical dimension as the "invisible" aspects of the town come over in a new, mysterious light.

One of the most precise characterizations of Bak Jensen is an article by Poul Erik Tøjner titled "Metaphysical realism". Tøjner explains how Bak Jensen removed realism by revealing the unreal at the centre of everyday life. Bak Jensen continued to follow this path, producing enlargements in increasingly large dimensions. Unfortunately, his photographs fail to produce the same effect when published in book form. This is particularly true of the exhibition Project Højbane (The Elevated Railway Project) which was his first venture into colour photography.

For Bak Jensen, photography is a means of interpreting the world. By choosing places and themes that are not normally considered interesting, he points to qualities in life we often ignore, for example the outlying areas of the city on Amager, Copenhagen street scenes in Den gådefulde by (The Enigmatic City), or industrial sites and motorways in Fotografi some ritual (Photography as a Ritual). Whether in black and white or colour, Bak Jensen makes optimal use of the technique's expressiveness.

He has also been effective in promoting photography. Students were keen to assist him in his laboratory at the Academy in the hope of deepening their knowledge of the art. He also conducted two seminars in 1989 and 1997, each resulting in a report documenting the discussions between artists and technicians about the potential of photography.

== Exhibitions ==
Bak Jensen's CV, lists the following exhibitions:

- “Per Bak Jensen 1981”, Galleri Image, Aarhus (1981)
- “Per Bak Jensen 1985”, Galleri A Gruppen, Copenhagen (1985)
- “Den Gådefulde By”, Galleri GARI, Copenhagen (1988)
- “Per Bak Jensen 1989”, Fotomuseet Brandts Klædefabrik, Odense (1989)
- “Projekt Højbanen”, Nørrebro Station, Copenhagen (1990)
- “Amagerbilleder”, Traneudstilling Gentofte Kunstbibliotek, Gentofte (1991)
- “Nye fotografier”, Ny Carlsberg Glyptotek, Copenhagen (1992)
- “Stedernes Væsen”, Louisiana, Humlebæk (1993)
- “Politikkens Tryk”, Politikens Galleri, Copenhagen (1995)
- “Pilgrimsbilleder”, Ny Carlsberg Glyptotek Loggia, Copenhagen (1996)
- “Fremdragninger”, Arken Museum for Moderne Kunst, Ishøj (1997)
- “Fremdragninger”, Esbjerg Kunstmuseum, Esbjerg (1998)
- “New Zealand”, Sarjeant Galleri, Whanganui, New Zealand (1998)
- “Gennemstrejf”, Stalke Galleri, Copenhagen, (1999)
- “Omgivelse”, Vestsjællands Kunstmuseum, Sorø (2000)
- “Omgivelse”, Sønderborg Slot, Sønderborg (2000)
- “Pure Nature”, Galleri von Bartha, Basel, Switzerland (2000)
- “Per Bak Jensen”, Galleri Niklas von Bartha, London, England (2001)
- “Forseelse”, Herning Kunstmuseum, Herning (2002)
- “Det syvende billede” Kunstmuseet Trapholdt, Kolding (2003)
- ”Figur og landskab” Galleri Bo Bjerggaard, Copenhagen (2004)

== Books by Bak Jensen ==
- Stedernes Væsen. The Being of Places. Copenhagen: Gyldendal, 1993.
- Hengivne Øjeblikke, Copenhagen: Gyldendal, 2001.
- Forseelse. Forlaget Bjerggaard, 2002.

== Awards ==
- Eckersberg Medal (2005)
- Thorvaldsen Medal (2015)

== See also ==
- Photography in Denmark
