= Krass Clement =

Danish photographer

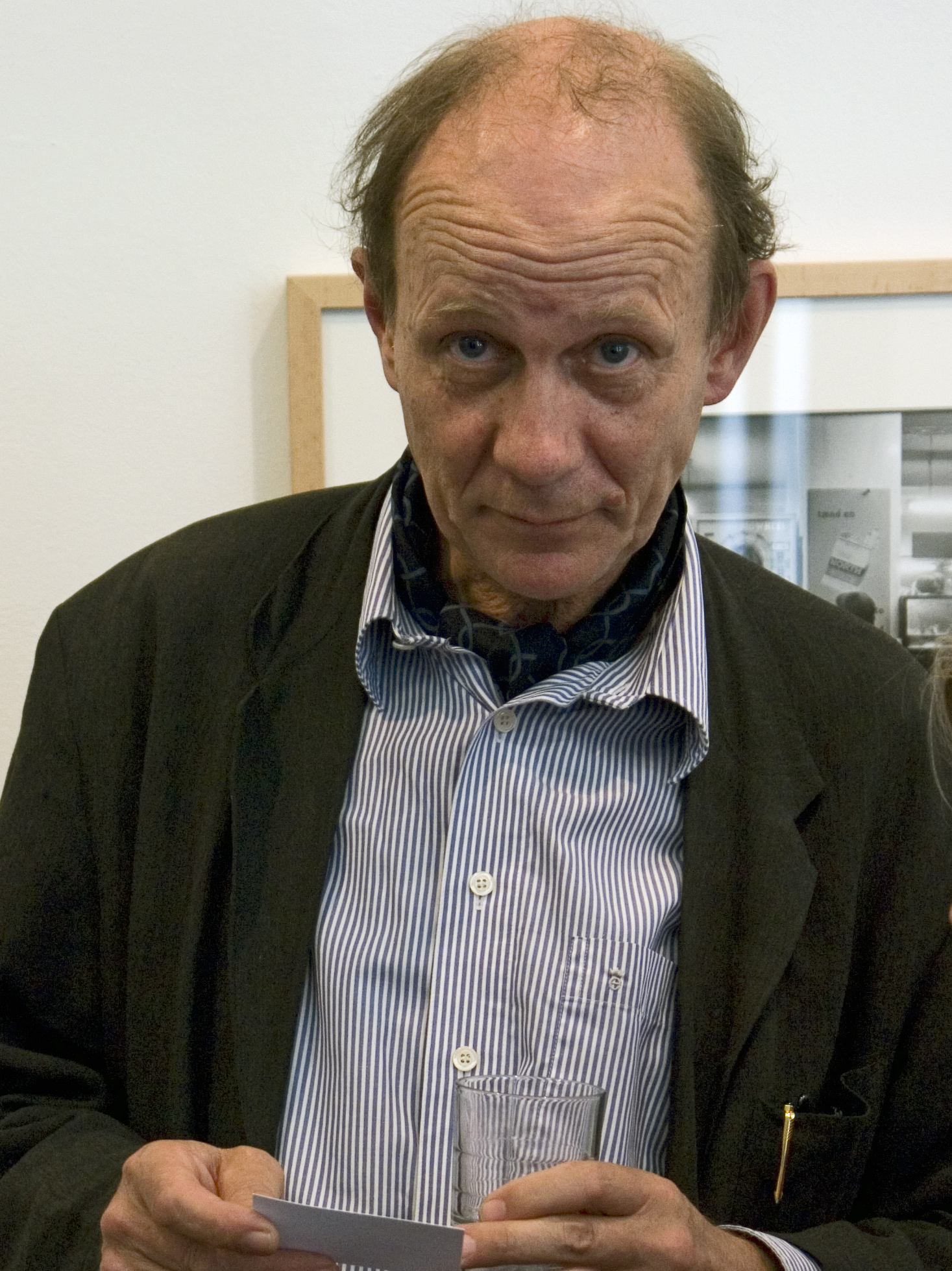
Clement

Krass Clement Kay Christensen (born 15 March 1946) is a Danish photographer who has specialized in documentary work. He graduated as a film director in Copenhagen but soon turned to still photography, publishing his first book Skygger af øjeblikke (Shadows of the Moment) in 1978. He has since become an active documentary photographer, focusing on people from both Denmark and abroad. His earlier work is black and white but since 2000 he has also worked in colour.

== Early life ==
Born in 1946, Clement spent much of his childhood in Paris with his father, an artist, and his mother, a pianist. He began to photograph in the late 1950s. After a few freelance jobs in Paris from 1967 to 1970, he studied cinematography at the National Film School of Denmark in 1973. In 1978, he published Skygger af øjeblikke with themes from Denmark and abroad, establishing his name as a documentary still photographer.

== Photographic work ==
Det Tavse Land (1981) builds on Skygger af øjeblikke but only with photographs from Denmark. Its portrayal of the Danes and Denmark is very different from other contemporary works. With a critical yet sympathetic approach, he presents both the wrinkled faces of peasants and the dissatisfied looks of children, together with a series of open landscapes where the road or railway extends to the horizon. Despite the grey melancholic weather, the liveliness of the figures makes the book one of the brightest Clement has produced.

While much of Clement's work was first presented in exhibitions, by the 1990s he had turned to books as his preferred medium, often producing a new work every six months. Among his many voluminous publications of black and white photographs are Byen bag Regnen. Fotografier fra København (1987), Af en Bys Breve. Fotografier fra Lissabon (1993), Drum. Et sted i Irland (1996), Langs Vinden. Et fotografisk Essay (1998) and Før Natten. Havana (2001). These pictorial essays contain very little commentary, just a few words or place names accompany the photographs.

His documentary work emerges more vividly in books where he serves as an illustrator for others, as for example in Kirsten Jacobsen and Alex Frank Larsen's book Med Sød Forståelse (1982) about massage parlours in Copenhagen's Vesterbro district. But the documentary approach can also be seen in his own work. Et Danmarksbillede på Storebælt (1999) and Påskesøndag mellem 11 og 16 (2000) both present pictures of Danish life within a well-defined period of time or the so-called decisive moment. His moving Ved Døden (1990) where he follows his mother's last day of life through to her death and cremation is a good example.

His concern with death can also be seen in two biographical essays: Det lånte Lys (1995) and Langs Vinden (1998), one of which depicts a cancer-stricken friend living on borrowed time but nonetheless slowly approaching his end. The other is a kind of fable, describing a journey from the south of France and up through Germany to Denmark with flashbacks showing how houses along the route have disappeared and their inhabitants have disappeared. The images are all the more meaningful as they show old cars and clothing fashions we can all remember.

Clement's Novemberrejsen (2008) consists of moving black and white photographs of a small Danish village which has remained the same for years, unaffected by modern developments. But we also realize it all might have been very different, as in so many other places in Denmark. His recent book Paris: Carnet de Recherche (2010) presents images of the less glossy side of Paris in the 1960s and 1970s taken during the years he spent there with his father, the painter Kay Christensen. His black and white photographs depict scenes from everyday life, often with rather sad-looking figures, in surroundings showing roads, benches, a prostitute's room, the metro, sidestreets and bars.

Clement's work is characterized by a consistent personal style that adapts the tradition of the decisive moment through an open, melancholic aesthetic. His composed black-and-white images emphasize candid portrayals of subjects in revealing situations.

== Publications ==
- Skygger af øjeblikke. Copenhagen: Erichsen, 1978. ISBN 8755505848.
- Det tavse land. Copenhagen: Borgen, 1981. ISBN 8741833406.
- Gentagelsens fest: Fotografier fra det københavnske 6 dages løb. Copenhagen: Borgen, 1984.
- Byen bag regnen: fotografier fra København. Copenhagen: Gyldendal, 1987. ISBN 8700147524.
- Ved døden: Anne-Katharina 22. november 1901–23. januar 1989. Copenhagen: Gyldendal, 1990. ISBN 8701448846.
- Hvor ingen talte: fotografier fra en park i Moskva. Copenhagen: Gyldendal, 1991. ISBN 8700101834.
- Af en bys breve: fotografier fra Lissabon. Copenhagen: Gyldendal, 1993. ISBN 8700166065.
- Det lånte lys: et fotografisk essay. Copenhagen: Gyldendal, 1995. ISBN 8700193682.
- Drum: et sted i Irland. Copenhagen: Gyldendal, 1996. An "almost autobiographical account of the three journeys that Clement made into and out of Dublin while staying in Monaghan in March 1991." ISBN 8700281565.
  - Krass Clement – Drum. Books on Books 16. Errata, 2012. ISBN 978-1935004318. With essays by Rune Gade and Jeffrey Ladd.
- Langs vinden: et fotografisk essay. Copenhagen: Gyldendal, 1998. ISBN 8700317462.
- Færgen: et danmarksbillede på Storebælt. Copenhagen: Gyldendal, 1999. ISBN 8700397024.
- Før natten. Copenhagen: Gyldendal, 2000. ISBN 8702004887.
- Påskesøndag ml. 11 og 16. Copenhagen: Gyldendal, 2001. ISBN 8700483540.
- Forandringen: Fotografier. Copenhagen: Gyldendal, 2002. ISBN 8702015870.
- Berlin notat. Copenhagen: Gyldendal, 2005. ISBN 8702037971.
- Lydhørt: Roskilde Festival 2003. Copenhagen: Gyldendal, 2005. ISBN 8702045044.
- København – et blik over ryggen. Copenhagen: Fotografisk Center, 2006. ISBN 8790362365.
- Novemberrejse. Copenhagen: Gyldendal, 2008. ISBN 8702073889.
- Paris: Carnet de recherche. Copenhagen: Gyldendal, 2010. ISBN 9788702101430.
- Venten på i går Auf Gestern warten Copenhagen: Gyldendal, 2012. ISBN 9788702130515.
- Bag Saga Blok. Copenhagen: Gyldendal, 2014. ISBN 9788702168167.
- Impasse Hotel Syria. Copenhagen: Gyldendal, 2016. ISBN 9788702201123.
- Dublin. Bristol: RRB, 2017. Edition of 1000 copies. Coincides with an exhibition of the work at the Gallery of Photography, Ireland.
- Across The Cut. Bristol: RRB, 2018. ISBN 9781999727543.
- Metrovia. Copenhagen: Gyldendal, 2021. ISBN 9788702256925.
- Belfast. Bristol: RRB, 2022.
- Timeslag. Copenhagen: Gyldendal, 2023. ISBN 9788702377828.

== Awards ==
- 1997: Life-long artist grant from the Danish arts foundation, Statens Kunstfond
- 1999: Thorvald Bindesbøll Medal
- 2006: Fogtdal Photographers Award

== Bibliography ==
- Honickel, Thomas: "Es ist schade um die Menschen – der dänische Fotograf Krass Clement", Photonews nr.4/07
- Jonge, Ingrid Fischer: "Det almindeliges nødvendighed", Carlsbergfondets Årsberetning 1998 p. 160-165
- Jonge, Ingrid Fischer: "Det usynlige" in Fotografi I Diamanten – udvalgte værker fra Det Nationale Fotomuseum, Copenhagen 2004
- Kleivan, Birna Marianne: "Budbringeren/The Messenger, An interview with Krass Clement" in Katalog Journal of Photography and Video 21.3, Odense 2009
- Orvel, Miles: "Franks America. Clements Copenhagen" in Sølv og Salte edited by Tove Hansen, Copenhagen 1990.
- Pedersen, Michael: "Som om…", Institute for Northern Philology, University of Copenhagen 1993.
- Thrane, Finn: "Ud I verden og hjem igen. Krass Clement" in Dansk fotografihistorie edited by Mette Sandby, Copenhagen 2005
- Wamberg, Jacob, and Krass Clement: "Dansk Nutidskunst nr. 19 – Krass Clement", Palle Fogtdal 1993.
