= Mads Alstrup =

Danish photographer (1808–1876)

- Born: 1808; Viborg, Denmark
- Died: 1876 (aged 67–68); Falun, Sweden

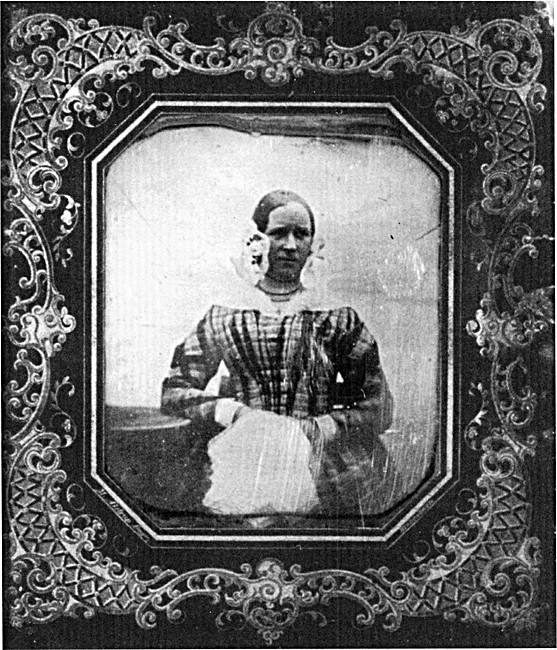
Mads Alstrup: Granny Clausen. Daguerreotype from 1845

Mads Alstrup (1808–1876) was the first Danish portrait photographer with his own studio.

From the opening of his studio in 1842, until he left the country in 1858, he produced an estimated 33,000 daguerreotypes in the Copenhagen area, before his business suffered beginning in 1857. He moved to Sweden in 1858 and continued to take portraits there until he died in 1876. He is considered one of the pioneers of photography in Denmark.

== Biography ==
=== Daguerreotype portraits in Denmark ===
Born in Viborg, Denmark and trained as a goldsmith, Alstrup initially had a business in Randers in Jutland. In the summer of 1842, he moved to Copenhagen and set up a daguerreotype studio behind the Hercules Pavilion in the Rosenborg Castle Gardens. In this popular area of the city, he found many clients interested in having their portraits taken. He advertised an exposure time of 1 minute.

From 1843 to 1848, he travelled around Denmark, spending a few days or weeks in different towns where he set up temporary studios. In 1849, he finally settled in Copenhagen, opening a studio at a central location on Østergade near Kongens Nytorv.

Constantly investing in new equipment, the quality of his work improved over time. It is estimated he produced 33,000 daguerreotypes in the 16 years he worked in Denmark.

=== Swedish period ===
After leaving Denmark in 1857, Alstrup moved to Sweden where he was nomadic, similar to his early Danish career. In 1859, he was in Hälsingborg and Kristianstad and in 1860, Gothenburg where he stayed for a few years. In 1863, he practiced in Malmö with G.S. Ekeund. He died in Falun, Sweden, in 1876.

== See also ==
- Photography in Denmark
- History of photography
