= Kirsten Klein =

Danish photographer

Kirsten Klein (born 18 January 1945) is a Danish photographer who since the mid-1970s has lived on the island of Mors. She has become one of Denmark's foremost landscape photographers, developing a highly characteristic, somewhat melancholic style, frequently achieved by employing older photographic techniques.

== Early life ==
Born in Stockholm, she completed her photographic studies in 1966. From 1967, she travelled widely, in particular to the United States, Central and South America, and later, to Ireland and Iceland. In 1976, she settled on the Danish island of Mors in northern Jutland.

== Artistic style ==
It was on Mors where, inspired by the island's landscape, she developed her characteristic style which has continued to evolve ever since: sensitive, poetic and often melancholy depictions of landscapes, marked by the changing seasons, the weather, human cultivation and the unending effects of nature itself. The sea is also a recurring theme: she has specialized in photographing the coasts of the North Sea and the Atlantic Ocean. Her work takes us on a kind of romantic, religious journey through nature. She works in all weathers and all season, showing her familiarity with nature. The part of nature that interests her the most is the transition between near and far and the wealth of shades of grey that lie in between the black of the shadow and the white light.

In her photography, Klein looks for the moments that have a touch of eternity in them. She looks for the timelessness of thousand-year-old tree trunks or stone formations which testify to the landscape's slow topographical development. In this context, nature is revealed as an organic whole, hardly touched by mankind.

Since the end of the 1980s, she has produced black-and-white photographs, often employing older techniques such as cyanotype and platinum printing.

== Awards ==
She was awarded the Thorvald Bindesbølls medal in 1994 and is the only female photographer in Denmark to be awarded a lifelong grant from the Danish Arts Foundation.

In 2001, she was the first photographer to be awarded Jyllands-Posten's cultural prize and in 2012, the first photographer to receive the Thorvaldsen Medal.

== Bibliography ==
- Klein, Kirsten (Text: Finn Thrane, Translation: Amy Lightfoot) "Det evige nu / The eternal present", Sophienholm, KunstCentret Silkeborg Bad, Denmark, 2007, 79 pp, parallel text in Danish and English. ISBN 978-87-92079-02-2.
- Klein, Kirsten, "Spor af tid på Mors", Morsø Kunstforening af 1961, 2007, 36 pp, ISBN 978-87-982243-4-1.
- Klein, Kirsten, "Mellem lyset og mørket", Copenhagen 2010, Gyldendal, 200 pp, ISBN 978-87-02-08079-7.

== See also ==
- Photography in Denmark
