= Sigvart Werner =

Sigvart Wilhelm Theodor Werner (13 June 1872 – 2 September 1959) was a Danish amateur photographer who gained fame through his artistic landscape photographs, published in book form.

Encouraged by the success of his early work Dyrehaven og Jægersborg Hegn (1919), between 1927 and 1940, he published a series of 15 photographic volumes, each covering one of the country's regions. Among the most popular were Bornholm and Nordsjælland. He was so motivated by the national romanticism movement that he not only tried to present nature as it was but touched up his photographs whenever he could.

Werner's photographs of Copenhagen present well-known sights and monuments, including the Little Mermaid, the City Hall and the Tivoli Gardens. He is careful to avoid shots of disadvantaged areas or untidy streets. If the prints are compared with the original negatives, it can be noticed that they have often been significantly altered. For example, the fisherwoman has been removed from Gammel Strand and the City Hall can be seen rising behind the National Museum.

His earlier work is generally considered to be his best.

== See also ==
- Photography in Denmark
