= Danish Union of Press Photographers =

Danish union

- Logo of the Danish Union of Press Photographers
- Formation: 1912
- Headquarters: Copenhagen, Denmark
- Chief Executive: Lars Lindskov
- Website: Official website

The Danish Union of Press Photographers (Danish: Pressefotografforbundet), a trade union, is the oldest national organization for newspaper photographers in the world. Based in Copenhagen, in 2009 it had 820 members.

== History ==
The union was founded in Copenhagen by six press photographers on 17 February 1912, just four years after the newspaper Politiken had employed Holger Damgaard, himself one of the founders, as the first press photographer in Denmark. The other five founders and earliest members were Julius Aagaard, Rolstad, Asker Michelsen, Th. Larsen and A.W. Sandberg. In 1927, the union had its first female member and by 1941, when the membership had grown to 25, it had its first members from the provinces. In 1962 the number of members had reached 148 and in 1967 it became part of the Danish Union of Journalists (Dansk Journalistforbund). In 1987 member numbers had grown to 428.

== The union today ==
As of 2009, the union has 800 members. They include Jan Grarup, Tine Harden, Nicolai Howalt, Henrik Saxgren, Trine Søndergaard and Charlotte Østervang.

== See also ==
- Photography in Denmark
