= Heinrich Tønnies =

Danish photographer (1825–1903)

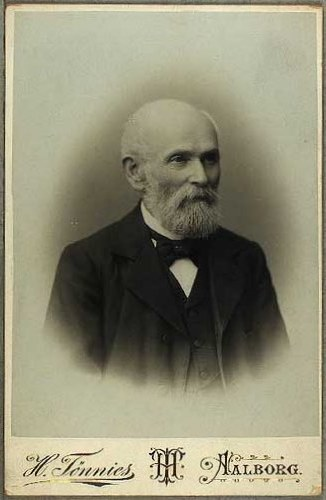
Heinrich Tønnies: self-portrait

Johan Georg Heinrich Ludwig Tønnies (or Tönnies) (10 May 1825 – 11 December 1903) was an early German-Danish photographer who had a studio in Aalborg, Denmark.

== Biography ==
Born in Grünenplan, Germany, he was trained as a glass painter and cutter.

He moved to Denmark in the 1850s where he learnt the art of daguerreotypy from the Berlin photographer C. Fritsche in Aalborg and from Wilhelm Schrøder in Copenhagen. He opened a photographic studio in Aalborg where he soon specialised in the carte-de-visite technique as it facilitated the production of prints. Most of his work was concentrated on portraits although he also took many landscapes. His photographs often presented people in their working clothes rather than formally dressed for the occasion.

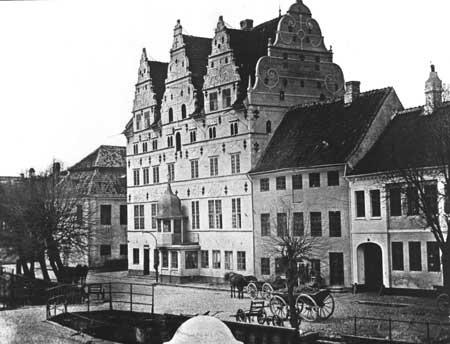
Heinrich Tønnies: Jens Bangs Stenhus (c. 1890)

He also took photographs of soldiers in uniform. especially at the time of the Second Schleswig War in 1864. Like Georg Emil Hansen, Tønnies travelled to the area and photographed many Danish soldiers before they went off to fight.

== See also ==
- Photography in Denmark
- History of photography

== Biography ==
- Allard, Alexander Sr. Heinrich Tönnies: Cartes-de-Visite Photographer Extraordinaire, New York: Camera/Graphic Arts Ltd, 1978. ISBN 0-918696-06-2. (in Danish and English)
