= Peter Faber (telegraph specialist) =

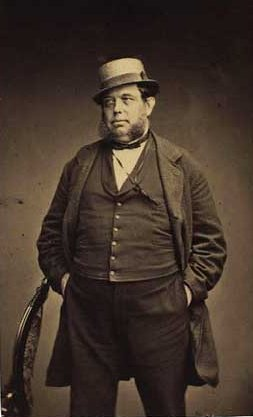
Peter Faber: photograph by Peter Most

Peter Christian Frederik Faber (7 October 1810 in Copenhagen – 25 April 1877) was a Danish telegraphy pioneer and song writer. In Denmark, he is remembered first and foremost for his songwriting. Faber was also an amateur photographer and is credited with the oldest photograph on record in Denmark.

== Early life and education ==
Faber was born on 17 October 1810 in Copenhagen, the son of smith Rasmus Hjort Faber (1764-1848) and Ane Margrethe Westphal (c. 1768-1831). He graduated from Westen's Unstitute in 1827.

== Telegraphy ==
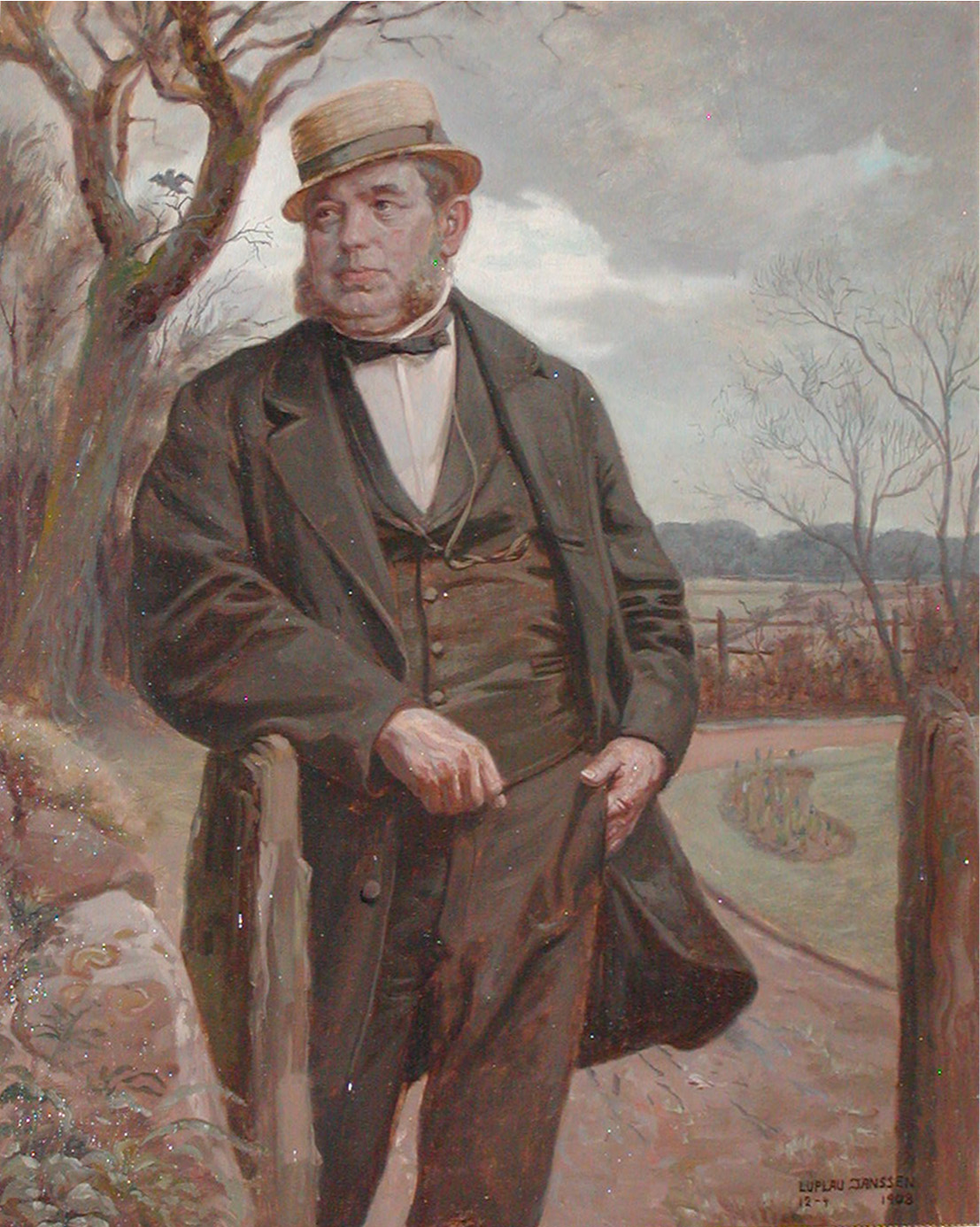
Peter Faber: painting by Luplau Janssen

After graduating in technology in 1840, he became an inspector at the Polyteknisk Læreanstalt (College of Advanced Technology) where he carefully followed the development of electromagnetic telegraphy. Together with Albert Boxwood Halberdier he wrote a report on the possibility of laying telegraph lines in Denmark. When a line successfully connected Helsingør and Hamburg, he became the director responsible. Faber quickly replaced the underground cables with overhead wires, extending the telegraph network from 530 km to 2,800 km with 200 relay stations and over 300 employees.

== Song writing ==
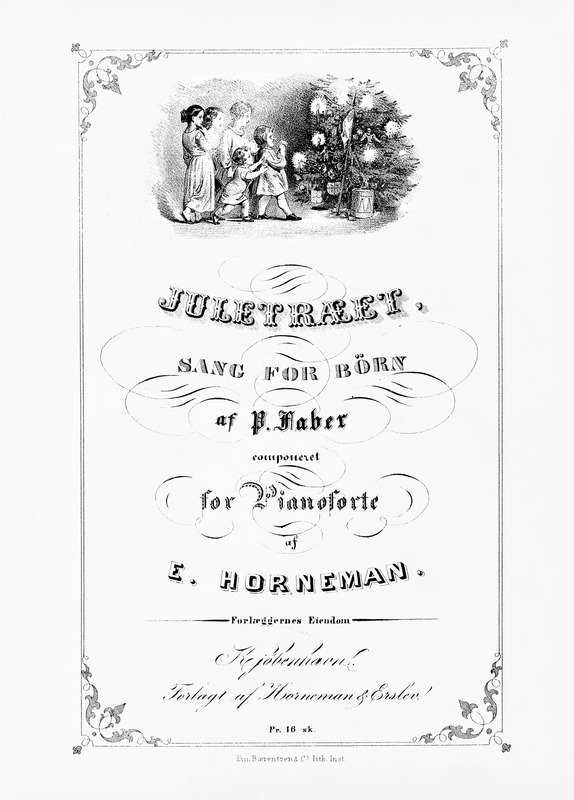
Juletræet, Sang for Börn, 1848

Faber wrote many songs, several of which have remained popular until today. They include Højt fra træets grønne top which is always sung around the family Christmas tree, and Dengang jeg drog af sted, written to celebrate the Danish victory at the 1848 Battle of Bov.

== Photography ==
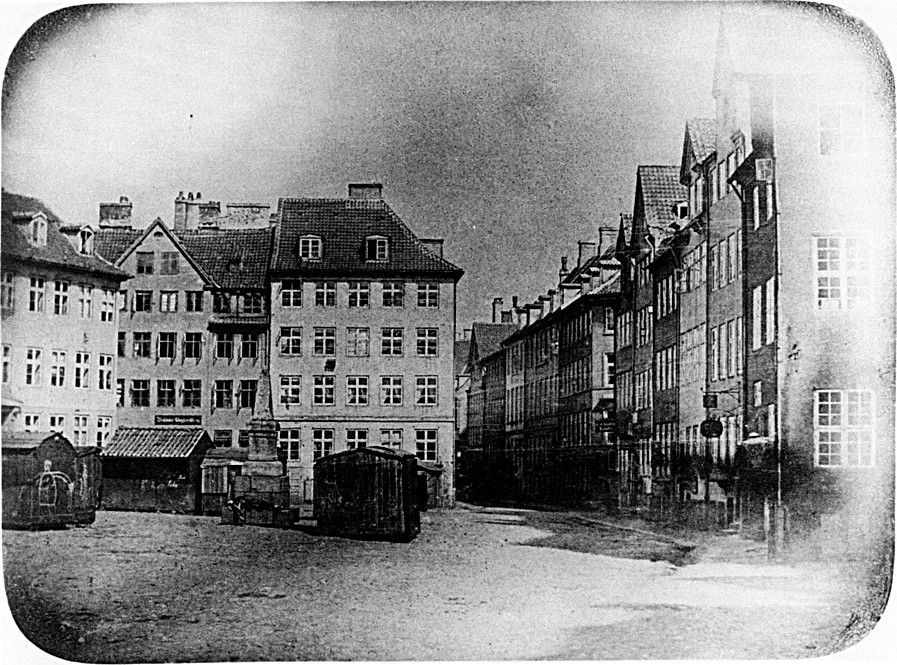
Peter Faber: Ulfelds Plads (1840)

The oldest photograph taken in Denmark is credited to Peter Faber. His daguerreotype of Ulfeldts Plads (now Gråbrødre Torv) is in the Copenhagen City Museum. It is a reversed image of the square, as was normal for daguerreotypes unless a mirror was used together with the camera. A careful analysis of the photograph is claimed to show that it dates back to July 1840. The exposure time of about 15 minutes in sunlight explains why the only figure to be seen is a man sleeping at the foot of the Pillar of Shame towards the left of the picture.
