= Benedicte Wrensted =

Danish-American photographer (1859–1949)

Benedicte Marie Wrensted
- Born: 1859; Hjørring, Jutland, Denmark
- Died: 1949 (aged 89–90); Los Angeles, California, U.S.
- Occupation: Photography
- Known for: images of the Northern Shoshone, Lemhi, and Bannock native peoples

Benedicte Marie Wrensted (February 10, 1859 – January 19, 1949) was a notable Danish-American photographer, who emigrated to the United States after running a studio for a few years in Horsens, Denmark. She was an obscure photographer who is most notably remembered for her documentation of the Northern Shoshone, Lemhi, and Bannock tribes in Idaho between 1895 and 1912.

She is remembered above all for the many photographs she took of the Shoshone native people in Idaho.

== Early life ==
Benedicte Wrensted was born in Hjørring, Jutland. Her parents were Captain Carl V. Wrensted, later an innkeeper, and Johanne Borgen. She grew up and attended school in Frederikshavn in the far north of Jutland. One of the few professions considered suitable for women at the time was photography. Wrensted learnt the craft in the 1880s from her aunt, Charlotte Borgen, who was a photographer in Frederikshavn. She then opened a studio of her own in Horsens which she ran for a few years before emigrating to the United States with her mother in 1894.

== Years in America ==
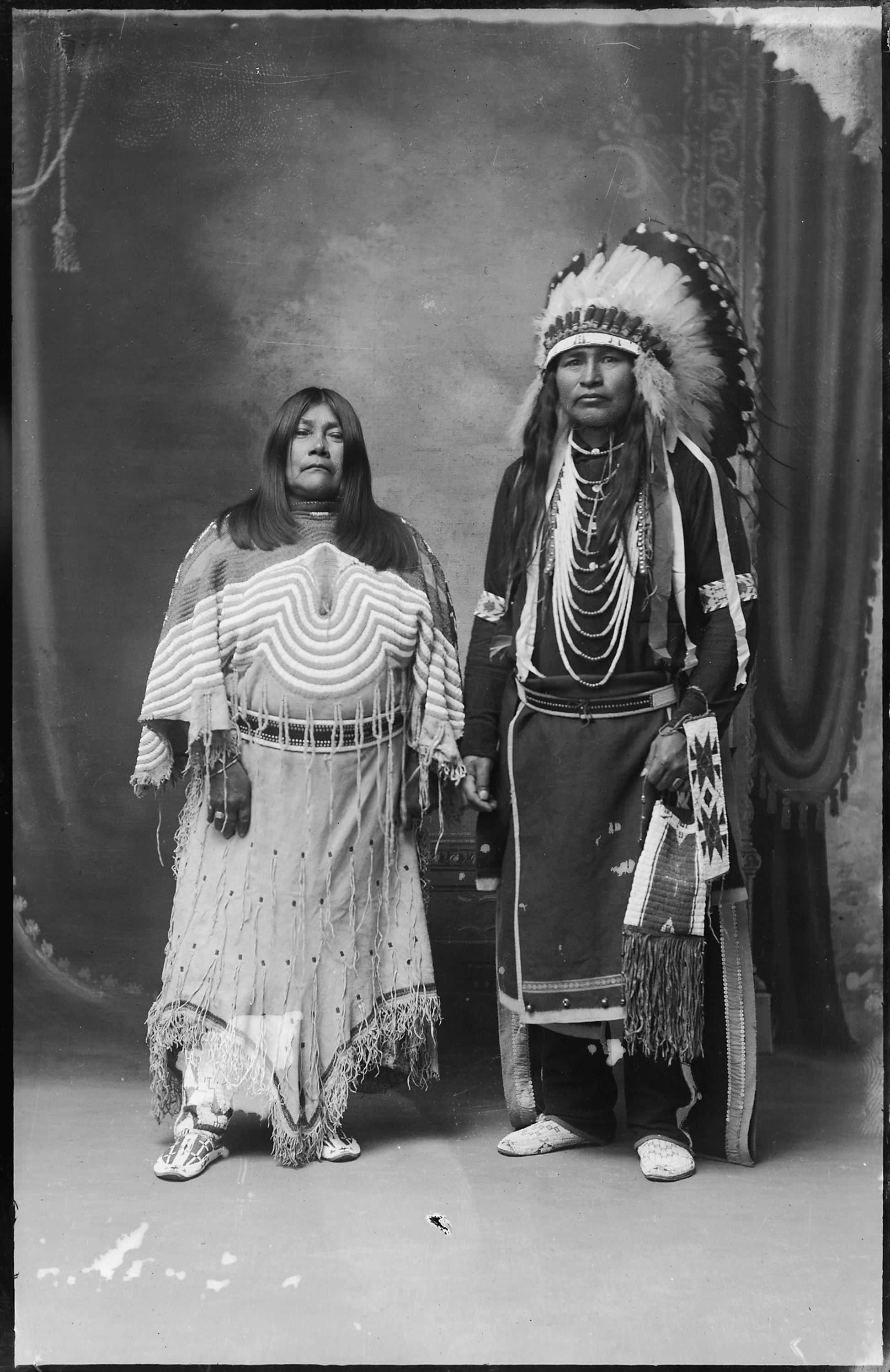
Portrait by Benedicte Wrensted of Pohene and Frank George, Lemhi Shoshone and Northern Shoshone (ca. 1897)

After immigrating to the United States from Denmark, she first went to visit a cousin in Philadelphia, then went on to Pocatello, a small town in southeastern Idaho where her brother Peter lived. She operated a photography studio in 1895 where she took photographs of the local and regional inhabitants and recorded the growth of the town. From her studio, she produced telling portraits of Northern Shoshone and Bannock Indians from 1895 to 1912. She was known for her expressive handling of natural light and the painterly quality of her photographs. Wrensted photographed The Edmos, a prominent Native American family from the Fort Hall Indian Reservation, quite often.

Wrensted became a U.S. citizen in 1912, at age 53, and the same year she ended her career as a photographer. She sold her studio in Pocatello and moved to Los Angeles where she died on January 19, 1949, shortly before her 90th birthday.

== Place in anthropology ==
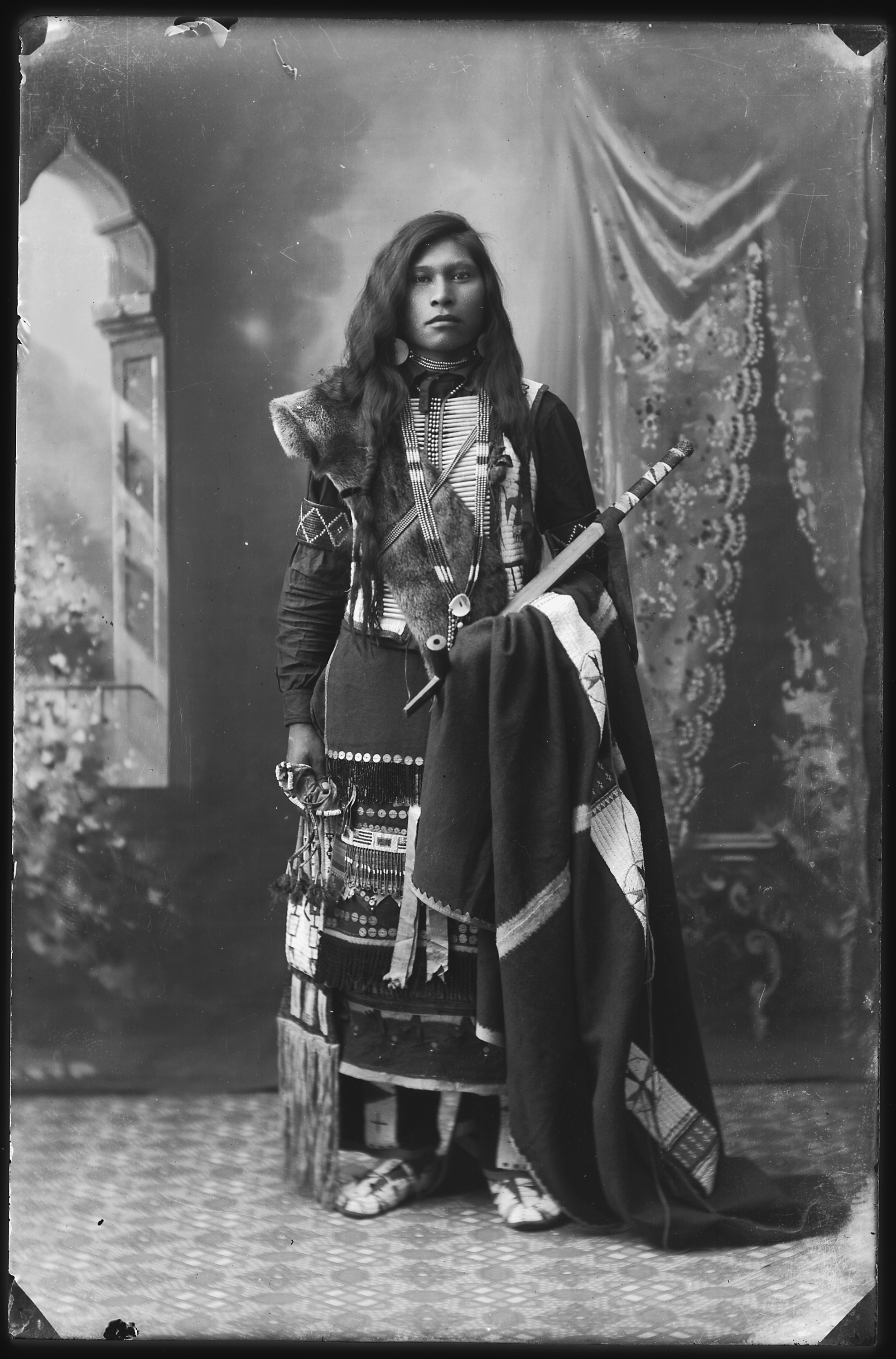
Portrait by Wrensted of Jimmie Sequint, Northern Shoshone (ca. 1897)

Many of her Native American images are preserved at the Smithsonian Institution and the National Archives. In the fall of 1984, Smithsonian anthropologist, Joanna Cohan Scherer was looking for photographs in the Smithsonian Institution's "Handbook of North American Indian" and came across the clutter of the Bannock County Historical Society in Pocatello, Idaho. She came across some Bannock County images that had the imprint "B. Wrensted, Pocatello." After rediscovering these photographs and finding a collection of glass plate negatives in the National Archives labeled "Portraits of Indians from Southeastern Idaho Reservations, 1897"., she was determined to find out more about Wrensted. She consulted tribal elders from the nearby Fort Hall Indian Reservation, wrote letters to people, checked business directories and looked through tons of museums and libraries in an effort to uncover the background of Wrensted and her photographs. The Idaho Museum of Natural History has a goal of demonstrating ways in which photographs can be placed within a historical context. Only 1% of Wrensted's images at the National Archives and Records Administration were identified at the onset of a digital library collection project. Once they were shown to the descendants at the Fort Hall Indian Reservation, information regarding families of origin were discovered and with the help of written records, 84% of Wrensted subjects have now been identified.

Scherer encourages the reader to "go beyond consideration of Wrensted's portraits as art," by advocating for the identification of the individual people portrayed in the photos as a means of avoiding stereotyping and the characterization of generic Indians as more "noble savages". "What sets Wrensted's work apart," says Scherer, "is her skill in portraying the humanity—the individuality—of the people who posed for her. She captured their presence with a dignity and beauty that transcend time and place." According to Scherer's estimates, today 170 of Wrensted's Shoshone Bannock images are known to exist in various collections, with a substantial number at the Idaho Museum of Natural History. Wrensted's photographs of her Indian subjects were not left with the people of the Fort Hall Indian Reservation, but were, as Scherer tells us, "uprooted from their place of origin and put into impersonal hands—namely, the National Archives in Washington, D.C."

== See also ==
- Photography in Denmark
