= Brandts Museum of Photographic Art =

Museum in Odense, Denmark

Coordinates: 55°23′46″N 10°22′50″E

The Danish Museum of Photographic Art (Danish: Museet for Fotokunst) is in Odense, Denmark. It is the only national Danish art museum dedicated specifically to photographic art. It was founded in 1987 as part of the Brandts International Center for Art and Culture.

The museum is an independent institution but as a state-approved art museum it receives partial funding from the Danish Heritage Agency under the Danish Ministry of Culture. It has a special obligation to Danish and international photography from World War II until today.

== History ==
The museum is in a former textiles factory, Brandts Klædefabrik, which produced fabrics for uniforms and others uses until it closed in 1977. For a few years the buildings were left empty until a private initiative convinced Odense Municipality that they were well suited for the establishment of an international arts centre. Early on it was decided that the centre should include a venue for photographic art.

The museum was founded as Museet for Fotokunst on 13 September 1985. It opened its own exhibition space in 1987, the following year—together with its affiliated institutions Kunsthallen and Danmarks Grafiske Museum—winning the title of European Museum of the Year. In 1992 the museum was state-approved and in 2000 Odense Foto Triennial was introduced with the museum as the driving force. This has later developed into the Fuenen Festival of Photography. In 2006 the museum received the Danish Museum of the Year award.

== Collections and exhibitions ==
The Permanente Collection is 150 square metres and is on the second floor. The museum's collections consist of approximately 9,000 Danish and international works, mainly from after World War II.

The 400 square metres dedicated to special exhibitions are on the first floor. On average the museum shows five or six special exhibitions in addition to the various editions of the permanent collection.

== Magazine ==
Since 1988 the museum has published the magazine Katalog - Journal of Photography and Video. It provides information on exhibitions and the museum and is published three times a year with subscribers in more than 20 countries. Texts are mainly in English.

== See also ==
- Photography in Denmark
