= Niels Wessel Bagge Art Foundation =

Danish nonprofit organization

The Niels Wessel Bagge Art Foundation (Danish: Niels Wessel Bagges Kunstfond) is a non-profit organization founded by the Danish dancer, scenographer and art collector Niels Wessel Bagge. Items from Bagge's own art and crafts collection are now on display in four Danish art museums. Each year, the foundation awards five to 10 grants to Danish artists.

== History ==
Niels Wessel Bagge was born into a wealthy family in Copenhagen. He later moved to America where he had a career in showbiz. He established the foundation in the United States through his will in 1994 and selected the businessman Ebbe Wedell-Wedell as its first chairman. The foundation is now based in Copenhagen, Denmark.

== Management ==
The foundation is administrated by a board consisting of Nina Wedell-Wedellsborg (chairman), lawyer Christian Alsøe, IT entrepreneur Juri Krasilnikoff and artist Lulu Refn.

== Grants ==
=== 2000s ===
Year	Recipients	Ref
2003	FOS (Thomas Poulsen)	Ref
2003	Rannvá Kunoy	Ref
2003	Kaspar Bonnén	Ref
2003	Peter Mandrup	Ref
2003	Peter Brandes	Ref
2003	Jane Reumert	Ref
2004	Iben West	Ref
2004	Malene Landgreen	Ref
2004	Kristian Dahlgaard	Ref
2004	Inuk Silis Høegh	Ref
2004	Doris Bloom	Ref
2004	Pernille Kløvedal Helweg	Ref
2005	FOS (Thomas Poulsen)	Ref
2005	Rannvá Kunoy	Ref
2005	Kaspar Bonnén	Ref
2005	Peter Mandrup	Ref
2005	Peter Brandes	Ref
2005	Jane Reumert	Ref
2006	Anette Harboe Flensburg	Ref
2006	Viera Collaro	Ref
2006	Peter Land	Ref
2006	Lars Nørgård	Ref
2006	Krass Clement	Ref
2006	John Kørner	Ref
2006	Kristian Devantier	Ref
2006	Gunleif Grube	Ref
2006	Eske Kath	Ref
2006	Kirsten Dehlholm	Ref
2007	Peter Linde Busk	Ref
2007	Alexander Tovborg	Ref
2007	Anders Bonnesen	Ref
2007	Lars Tygesen	Ref
2007	Jun-Ichi Inoue	Ref
2007	Per Morten Abrahamsen	Ref
2007	Karin Kaster	Ref
2007	Sonny Tronborg	Ref
2008	Astrid Kruse Jensen	Ref
2008	Esben Klemann	Ref
2008	Mie Olise Kjærgaard	Ref
2008	Nicolai Howalt / Trine Søndergaard	Ref
2008	Jonas Hvid Søndergaard	Ref
2009	Adam Saks	Ref
2009	Jeppe Hein	Ref
2009	Eva Koch	Ref
2009	Cathrine Raben Davidsen	Ref
2009	Eva Steen Christensen	Ref
2009	Erik Varming	Ref
2009	Morten Buch	Ref

=== 2010s ===
Year	Recipients	Ref
2010	Jeannette Ehlers	Ref
2010	Morten Schelde	Ref
2010	Marie Søndergaard Lolk	Ref
2010	Andreas Schulenburg	Ref
2010	Ulrik Crone	Ref
2010	Erik Varming	Ref
2010	Christian Skeel	Ref
2010	Peter Callesen	Ref
2010	Superflex	Ref
2016	Sophie Dupont	Ref
2016	Christian Danielewitz	Ref
2016	Astrid Myntekær	Ref
2016	Absalon Kirkeby	Ref
2016	Ditte Gantriis	Ref
2016	Troels Sandegård	Ref
2016	Silas Inoue	Ref
2016	Amalie Smith	Ref
2016	Merete Vyff Slyngborg	Ref
2016	Tina Maria Nielsen	Ref
2016	Jean Marc Routhier	Ref
2016	Morten Skrøder Lund	Ref
2016	Sian Kristoffersen	Ref
2017	Kirsten Ortwed	Ref
2017	Heine Kjærgaard Klausen	Ref
2017	Peter Brandes	Ref
2017	Benedikte Bjerre	Ref
2017	Mathias and Mathias	Ref
2024	Cecilie Norgaard; Javier Tapia; Tinne Zenner; Berit Heggenhougen-Jensen; Rebekka Hilmer Heltoft; Anna Stahn; Jytte Rex; Åse Eg Jørgensen; Frederik Næblerød; Freja Sofie Kirk; Martin Brandt Hansen	Ref
