= Frederik Næblerød =

Danish artist

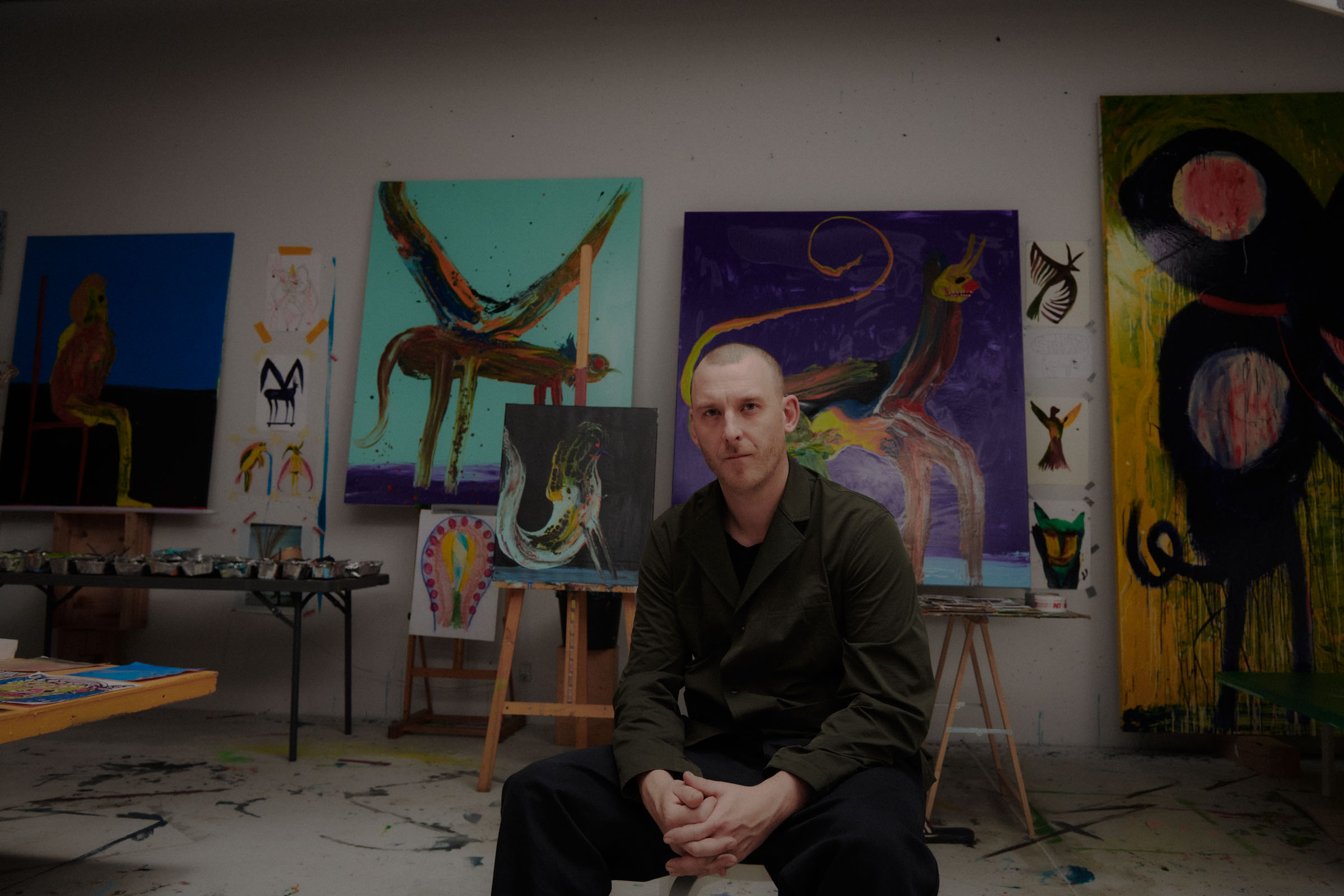
- Born: 1988 (age 37–38); Frederiksberg, Denmark
- Education: The Royal Danish Academy of Fine Arts
- Known for: Paintings, sculptures, ceramics, bronze, drawing, and installation

Frederik Næblerød (born 1988 in Frederiksberg) is a Danish visual artist whose practice spans painting, sculpture, ceramics, bronze, drawing, and installation. He is known for his expressive visual language, raw energy, and figurative worlds where the grotesque, playful, and deeply human merge. Næblerød lives and works in Copenhagen and has his studio in Sydhavnen.

== Early life and education ==
Frederik Næblerød grew up in Frederiksberg as the son of a lawyer and an economist. As a child, he was known for his restless energy, and it was only through drawing and painting that he found calm. During his teenage years, Næblerød became part of Copenhagen's graffiti scene, where he began exploring color, form, and freedom in public space—an experience that would later become central to his artistic practice.

In 2011, Næblerød attended Kunstskolen Spektrum, where he developed a professional approach to his work and established his first studio in Copenhagen's Meatpacking District (Kødbyen). That same year, he applied to the Royal Danish Academy of Fine Arts but was rejected. The following year, he applied again and was admitted to the Painting School, from which he graduated in 2018 with 23 glazed ceramic sculptures as his final project.

== Artistic practice ==
Næblerød's practice is characterized by a spontaneous and physical approach to materials, in which energy and movement play a central role. He works across painting, sculpture, ceramics, bronze, drawing, and large-scale installations. His visual world often features hybrid beings—part human, part animal—as well as masks, spirits, and creatures in transformation.

Thematically, his works revolve around the inner life of human beings and the sides of ourselves we attempt to suppress. Through grotesque and expressive figures, he explores the unconscious, fear, desire, and transformation. Næblerød has described painting as entering a bubble of freedom, where he can express every human emotion.

Several critics have compared his work to the CoBrA movement, particularly because of its spontaneous energy, vibrant use of color, and belief in art's capacity to create community. Like the CoBrA artists—among them Asger Jorn—Næblerød operates in the intersection between play and seriousness, between control and chaos, seeking to bring art into life itself—away from the academic and into a direct, sensory encounter with the audience.

== Exhibitions and projects ==
In 2015, together with artist Casper Aguila, Næblerød created My Friend the Wind on the beach in Rørvig, at the site where a summer house once owned by author Kai Hoffmann had been destroyed during Storm Bodil in 2013. The artists rebuilt the house both inside and out, decorating it with paintings. The work functioned as a temporary public installation on the beach and was destroyed by Hurricane Urd in 2016.

In 2016, Næblerød and Aguila installed Memorial Flag at Anneberg Psychiatric Hospital in Odsherred. The flag served as a memorial to the many patients whose brains were removed for research between 1945 and 1982. The brains are now kept at Aarhus University, while the bodies are buried in what is known as “The Cemetery of the Brainless.”

In 2017, Næblerød presented Addicted to Sex at Galleri Tom Christoffersen—an exhibition featuring 15 ceramic sculptures glazed in gold lustre, examining desire, shame, and the body's expression through exaggeration and humor.

In 2018, Flying Away from Society followed at Alice Folker Gallery, featuring works that reflected on the human urge for escape, dreams, and isolation through grotesque and humorous imagery. The exhibition was nominated for the AICA Award (Danish Art Critics Award).

Between 2018 and 2020, Næblerød and Aguila developed The Farm (Country Club) in Vig, where an abandoned farm was transformed into a total installation. The entire barn was covered in vivid murals and filled with large figures, sculptures, photographs, and paintings, integrating everything from flowerpots to the pigsty into a unified artistic environment. The works produced at the farm culminated in the exhibition Off-Grid at Alice Folker Gallery, which received a prize from the Danish Arts Foundation.

In 2019, Næblerød presented Monsters and Politics at Kunsthal for Maritim Æstetik, where paintings, sculptures, and mixed-media works used monstrous figures as metaphors for fear, power, and societal absurdities.

That same year, Næblerød and Aguila exhibited Protection from Bad Weather at Politikens Forhal, showing Memorial Flag, a new version of My Friend the Wind, and several art films. The project received a distinction from the Danish Arts Foundation, and the films were later shown at Kunsthal Charlottenborg.

In 2020, Næblerød appeared in the Danish Broadcasting Corporation's (DR) TV series Kunstnerkolonien, where he, alongside five of Denmark's leading artists—John Kørner, Marie Torp, Cathrine Raben Davidsen, Kirsten Justesen, and Erik A. Frandsen—created their own artist colony in Skagen. Living and working together, they produced new works inspired by the surroundings, resulting in a joint exhibition curated by Kunsthal Charlottenborg’s then-director, Michael Thouber. The following year, Næblerød was the main subject of the documentary series Ufortyndet, which followed him over 14 days, offering an intimate look into his working process, daily life, and the challenges of living as a contemporary artist.

In 2021, he presented Mental Make-Up at Alice Folker Gallery, featuring paintings, ceramics, and objects that portrayed psychological layers and mental masks, illustrating the human inner world and emotional complexity. That same year, he designed the official art poster for Copenhagen Jazz Festival.

In 2022, his first solo museum exhibition, Time to Move, was shown at Horsens Art Museum, featuring large-scale paintings and ceramic sculptures exploring movement, transformation, and collective dynamics. Also in 2022, Work in Progress at Vejle Art Museum introduced an open studio concept, where unfinished works and experimental processes formed part of the exhibition's aesthetic.

In 2023, Gl. Holtegaard presented Masquerade, a site-specific exhibition by Frederik Næblerød. In the show, Næblerød imagined the life that once unfolded at the baroque estate when it was built in the mid-18th century. Drawing inspiration from the site’s history and atmosphere, he created an installation combining painting, ceramics, mannequins, costumes, and historical props. The exhibition reflected on themes of ambition, power, and social hierarchy, taking its point of departure in the story of Lauritz de Thurah, the Danish baroque architect who built Gl. Holtegaard as his private residence. Referencing both the decadence of the French court at Versailles and the masquerade balls of the baroque era, Masquerade merged past and present in a theatrical, fictive universe characteristic of Næblerød’s expressive practice.

In 2024, Næblerød and Aguila presented Places Like This at Odsherred Museum, staged in a former school in Nykøbing Sjælland. Using recycled materials—wood panels, paint, and discarded paintings from the local recycling station—they transformed the building's first floor into an immersive environment filled with murals, sculptures, photographs, and sketches. The exhibition explored themes of place, community, and human interaction. That same year, Næblerød presented Family Affair at Alice Folker Gallery, addressing relationships, intimacy, and emotional masks through painting and ceramics.

In 2025, ARKEN Museum of Contemporary Art presented Næblerød's largest solo exhibition to date, which resulted in a 40 percent increase in museum attendance. The exhibition, All Walks of Life, spanned seven galleries featuring ceramics, paintings, bronze sculptures, and a collage wall with photographs by Frederik Clement, who had followed Næblerød for three years. During the show, Næblerød relocated his studio to the museum, allowing visitors to observe his creative process. One of the galleries was dedicated to a reconstruction of My Friend the Wind, the beach house first built in 2015 and recreated from recycled materials for the exhibition's final room. The show explored human community, identity, and the diversity of existence through grotesque yet life-affirming figures.

Also in 2025, Odsherreds Kunstmuseum presented TIMELINE, a survey of Næblerød and Aguila's collaborative projects in Odsherred over the past decade. The exhibition included paintings, photographs, sculptures, and video installations, complemented by a monumental mural covering the museum's white exterior walls. The mural featured large black figures rendered in a bold, contrasting style described as a kind of modern cave painting. Inside, black-and-white works echoed the façade's motifs, while two color video installations broke the monochrome expression. The exhibition sparked debate due to its striking visual impact but was later awarded a distinction by the Danish Arts Foundation for its exceptional artistic quality. In its statement, the Foundation praised Næblerød and Aguila for “subtly intervening in Odsherred’s nature, showing both a romantic landscape and raw nature—and the vulnerability of humankind.”

== Exhibitions ==
=== Solo exhibitions ===
- 2025: All Walks of Life, ARKEN Museum of Contemporary Art, Denmark
- 2024: Family Affair, Alice Folker Gallery, Denmark
- 2023: Masquerade, Gl. Holtegaard, Denmark
- 2022: Work in Progress, Vejle Art Museum, Denmark
- 2022: Time to Move, Horsens Art Museum, Denmark
- 2021: Mental Make-Up, Alice Folker Gallery, Denmark
- 2019: Monsters and Politics, Kunsthal for Maritim Æstetik, Denmark
- 2018: Flying Away from Society, Alice Folker Gallery, Denmark
- 2017: Addicted to Sex, Galleri Tom Christoffersen, Denmark

=== Duo and group exhibitions ===
- 2025: Smittet af Bacillen, HEART – Herning Museum of Contemporary Art, Denmark
- 2025: Timeline (duo with Casper Aguila), Odsherreds Kunstmuseum, Denmark
- 2024: FEEL ME, Trapholt Museum, Denmark
- 2024: Places Like This (duo with Casper Aguila), Odsherreds Kunstmuseum, Denmark
- 2024: Kunstnerkolonien i Italien & Gensyn, Sophienholm Art Hall, Denmark
- 2024: Hot Hands, Skovgaard Museum, Denmark
- 2022: Lazy 8 (duo with Farshad Farzankia), The Telegraph, Czech Republic
- 2022: Seriously Fun (duo with Jeppe Hein), Jeppe Hein Studio, Germany
- 2021: MISA VAN HAM, powered by t, Germany
- 2020: Fed ler – Krukker i kunsten nu, Gl. Holtegaard Museum, Denmark
- 2020: Little Island, Haverkampf Gallery, Germany
- 2020: Dependance x Brussels, Alice Folker Gallery, Denmark
- 2019: CoBrA and Some Consequences, Collaborations, Denmark
- 2019: Protection from Bad Weather (duo with Casper Aguila), Politikens Forhal, Denmark
- 2019: Contemporary Figuration in the Post-Digital Age, Superzoom, France
- 2019: Off-Grid (duo with Casper Aguila), Alice Folker Gallery, Denmark
- 2018: Hypnagogia, Nevven Gallery, Sweden
- 2018: New “Bad” Painting, V1 Gallery, Denmark
- 2018: Worshiping Sticks and Stones, Anat Ebgi, USA
- 2018: MFA Show, Kunsthal Charlottenborg, Denmark
- 2017: Brask Collection Meets Willumsen, J.F. Willumsen Museum, Denmark
- 2017: NADA Art Fair, Canada Gallery (New York), USA
- 2017: We Are the Ones Doing Works on Canvas Painting (with Robert Nava), CGK, Denmark
- 2016: Texas Contemporary, The Second Bedroom, USA

== Grants and awards ==
- 2019: Off-Grid (with Casper Aguila), Prize from the Danish Arts Foundation
- 2020: Silkeborg Art Grant
- 2024: Niels Wessel Bagge’s Art Foundation

== Collections ==
Frederik Næblerød's works are included in the following collections:

- The Danish Arts Foundation
- The New Carlsberg Foundation
- Skovgaard Museum
- Horsens Art Museum
- Vejle Art Museum
- Kastrupgård Collection
- Museum Jorn
- Trapholt

== Publications ==
- Næblerød, Frederik Clement, Friis Publications, 2025. ISBN 978-87-975871-2-6
- Frederik Næblerød – All Walks of Life, Ed. Marie Nipper & Christian Kortegaard Madsen, Strandberg Publishing, 2025. ISBN 978-87-92596-74-1
- Casper Aguila and Frederik Næblerød: Odsherred Projects, Britta Tøndborg, Museum West Zealand, ISBN 9788797228626
- Time to Move, Ed. Claus Hagedorn-Olsen, Horsens Art Museum, 2022. ISBN 978-87-93836-09-9
- New Neighbours: Introducing Frederik Næblerød, Casper Aguila, Ed. Line Rosenvinge, Frederiksberg: Tender Task, 2021
