= Anselm Reyle =

German painter (b. 1970)

- Born: February 12, 1970 (age 56); Tübingen, Germany
- Education: State Academy of Fine Arts Stuttgart
- Style: abstraction
- Website: https://www.anselmreyle.com

Anselm Reyle (born 1970) is a German visual artist, based in Berlin. He is known for his often large-scale abstract paintings and found-object sculptures.

== Biography ==
Anselm Reyle was born in Tübingen, Germany in 1970. He studied at the State Academy of Fine Arts Stuttgart; followed by study at the Academy of Fine Arts, Karlsruhe, under artist Helmut Dorner.

He moved to Berlin in 1997 where he founded a studio cooperation with John Bock, Dieter Detzner, Berta Fischer, and Michel Majerus.

From 1999 to 2001, Reyle has been working together with Claus Andersen and Dirk Bell for the artists' co-operative gallery "Andersen's Wohnung" and "Montparnasse" with Dirk Bell and Thilo Heinzmann. After having held a position as guest-professor at the Staatlichen Akademie der Bildenden Künste, Karlsruhe, Universität der Künste, Berlin and the University of Fine Arts of Hamburg (HFBK Hamburg). Reyle became a professor in drawing and painting at HFBK Hamburg in 2009.

== Works ==
Anselm Reyle took an early interest in landscape design and music before finally homing in on painting and sculpture. Characteristic of his work are various found objects that have been removed from their original function, altered visually and recontextualized. Reyle works in different media, utilizing strategies of painting, sculpture and installation and working in serial, structured work groups. The artist uses a vast and diverse group of materials taken from both traditional art and commercial milieus including colored foils from shop window displays, acrylic medium and pastes, automotive lacquer, and useless everyday garbage taken from urban areas. By removing these materials from their contexts and masking their original function, Reyle varies the degree to which each retains its respective visual reference. Utilizing formulas of appropriation the work lets the viewer shift between moments of identification of individual elements within the work, and periods of alienation due to their new context. Even the exhibition and work titles are very often citations from different fields, such as song texts; they function as objets-trouvés of the artist's repertoire.

“Originally I started to do gestural painting, but at the same time I was always interested in experimenting with different materials. For me, in both cases, coincidence plays an important role as well as the requirement to work with the unexpected. After my work had become increasingly conceptual and technically perfect in the past years, I started to open up my artistic practice again to a more free and gestural approach recently. In the end, I guess it’s these two poles that determine my work.” – Anselm Reyle

One of Anselm Reyle's best known work series are his “foil paintings” - the highly celebrated abstract works that are created using foil arranged and installed in colored perspex boxes. Their shimmering materiality seduces the recipient's eye and stimulates their sense of touch, at the same time the perspex box denies any possibility of a tactile experience. The dynamic surface of these works emphasizes their objecthood and spatial presence, the fragile folded foil forms contrasting with their rigid geometry.

The "stripe paintings" are another well-known series of the artist. Here Reyle systematically deflates the art historical cliché with uniform, vertical stripes of paint. He consciously uses disruptive elements, such as folds in the foil, a blot of paint serving as a standardized signature or a last stripe cut at the edge of the pictorial plane. He is fascinated by the fact that such a simple striped theme allows him to create so many and such truly impressive variations on the color composition, as can be seen in a later example featuring narrow strips. Over the years Reyle increasingly started to make use of foil, mirrors, special-effect pastes, and textured pastes as well as incorporating steel frames as a stylistic element in his images.

Despite Reyle's ongoing commitment to abstraction, he is also experimenting with representational motives. Indeed, in a series created from 2010 until 2013, Reyle playfully explores the origin of the figure by explicitly referencing the tradition of “paint-by-numbers,” thereby revealing the way abstract forms can coalesce and become recognizable subjects from life. By using a strategy such as seen in paint-by-numbers, the subject matter is dissected in single, serially numbered parts like a puzzle where each number is assigned a certain color that is in interaction with other fields. These are then filled in with materials or colors that the viewer can recognize from the Reyle repertoire, as in his stripe paintings or the Otto-Freundlich-series. This juxtaposition creates the impression of a plastic relief with a wide range of surface textures which directly appeals to the viewer's sense of touch.

A well-known series of sculptures by Anselm Reyle are the so-called „African sculptures“. The original forms and titles for these work groups are borrowed from tourist markets and the kitschy flea market handicrafts – often made from soapstone – that are sold as clichés of African sculpture. Set on a low-lying Macassar wooden plinth, his piece Harmony (2007) is based on a small soapstone sculpture his mother purchased on a visit to Africa. While cheap and derivative, in their formal conception these forms recall the prominent abstract sculptors of modern art like Hans Arp, Alexander Archipenko and Henry Moore. The distinct influence of European sculpture on these African knick-knacks manifests itself in this suggested prototype of modern plastic art. Reyle uses traditional techniques; enlarging the original found object before casting it in bronze, chroming and lacquering it. This process creates a work with great tension as the traditional hand sculptural technique is contrasted with the highly engineered bronze work. The viewer's foreknowledge of the techniques that Reyle underwent to create and transform the object is vital to communicate this intentional paradox.

While he is well known for his use of unusual materials and physical alterations, Reyle's work is grounded in art historical schools of abstraction dating from the early 20th century, including Art Informel, Cubism, Op-Art, Minimalism and Pop Art. And while Reyle often works within the tradition of object trouvés he does not rely on appropriation as in the work of, for example, Louise Lawler or Elaine Sturtevant. Instead Reyle uses his highly refined aesthetic vocabulary to question the role excess plays in the postmodern market by collapsing and mixing these various traditions in unexpected ways. Indeed, by exploiting both historic languages and simultaneously developing an evolving vocabulary of new industrial practices and mass production methods he is able to reflect upon the various “blind alleys of modernity.”

Reyle's fascination for high gloss effects and decorative material taken from the merchandising world frames his critique of kitsch, and what the artist has described as “a tightrope walk that can be painful all the way.”. This critique deals frankly with the distinction between the normative categories of “high art” and “low-culture”, and questions where these extremes merge. By juxtaposing precious materials and trash, and by outsourcing his production, Reyle is able to make work that operates as a witness to our time and that prompts reflection on the prevailing values of our consumer culture. Despite its critique of bourgeois ideals, however, the work does not deliver simple alternative with genuine moral appeal and insists on sometimes retaining its ironic tone. By producing serial works Reyle is able to challenge the primacy of the single panel painting.

The discrepancy in his works between the primarily sublime ideal of abstraction and the seemingly provocative decorative visual orientation generates an ambivalent tension and it is in this space that the form and subject matter drift apart. The spontaneity of concept and dynamic vitality of this work stands in contrast to the complex technical transformation that is itself only achievable with the help of many sophisticated technical processes used by the artist in collaboration with specialized companies. The outsourcing of his artistic process is also found in his studio structure, where the artist has employed a team since 2001. In addition to his studio work, Reyle's interest in experimenting with unusual materials is also expressed in site-specific installations, such as his exhibition „Acid Mothers Temple“ in the Kunsthalle Tübingen (2009) or „Elemental Threshold“ (2010) in the Museum Dhondt Dhaenens, Belgium. In 2017 on the occasion of his solo exhibition "Eight Miles High" at the König Galerie Berlin, Reyle presented three hanging sculptures, which were inspired by geometric wind chimes made of metal, such as those found as handicrafts at fairs.

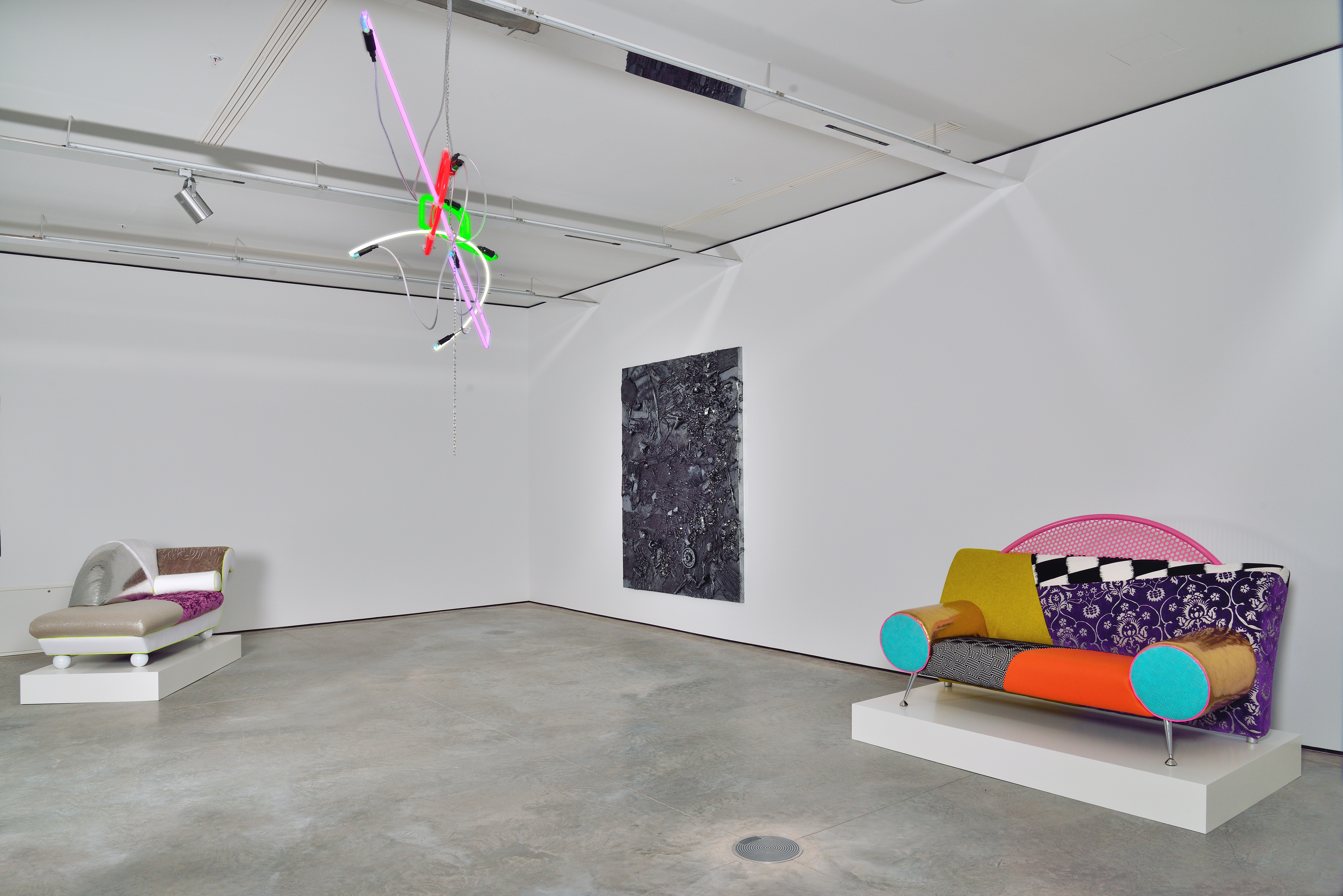
Anselm Reyle - installation shot from the personal exhibition "Electric Spirit" at Gary Tatintsian Gallery in 2013

In his recent works, Reyle seems to incline even more to the intuitive and the sensual, developing his characteristic formal vocabulary and working with found objects. Here his ceramics play a key role, which he started to produce in 2016. These sculptures with their striking colours and encrusted surfaces, are inspired from flamboyant Fat Lava vases that appeared in the 1970s and ended up in flea markets as kitsch shortly after. Reyle takes this stylistic phenomenon as a motif, to experiment intensively with forms and glazes and develop a group of vase-like sculptures in large format. It was important to him to integrate chance more closely when working with the natural material clay — quite literally, you never know exactly what will come out of the oven. Random defects are often aesthetically interesting. Reyle is intentionally gestural; he spontaneously interferes in the process to allow some defects to happen, he even creates necessary conditions that would cause such defects: in this way, it is possible to open a space for aesthetical gesture and interpretation. For this end, Reyle gesturally maltreats the material before putting it into the oven, he adds scratches and cracks to the surface that often break open the closed form of the vessel. It is completed with the informal application of boiling lava paste and bright orange or cadmium yellow glazes or metallic monochrome surfaces. This is how Reyle creates style hybrids, which are rooted in both kitsch and traditional traits of contemporary art (think of Lucio Fontana, for example); he intuitively opens them up in his staging, while creating a certain ambivalence.

In his recent series of paintings the artist seeks to open up the very process of painting, like he does in his ceramics. Many of these works are painted on coarse burlap, the presence of materiality and free form play a strong role again. Those paintings are intense concentrations of contradicting dynamics; here Reyle plays out the dissonant colors and material canon that he developed over the years, in a free abstract form. All the pieces of his previously developed vocabulary - his signature gestures - can be found in these works while at the same time they are woven into a new complexity to gain new intensity and new visual effectiveness.

== Exhibitions ==
Reyle's past solo exhibitions include shows at König Galerie, Berlin (2023), Aranya Art Center Quinhuangdao (2020), König Galerie (2017), Galerie Almine Rech (2017), Gary Tatintsian Gallery (2013), Deichtorhallen Hamburg (2012), Kunsthalle Tübingen (2009); the Modern Institute in Glasgow (2007); one of new sculptures and paintings at Kunsthaus Zürich (2006); Galerie Giti Nourbakhsch, Berlin and Gavin Brown's Enterprise, New York. His first U.S. solo show was mounted by the Des Moines Art Center.

The artist is primarily represented in private collections such as The Saatchi Gallery, London, Daimler Collection, Berlin, Fondation Pinault, Venice, and Rubell Family Collection, Miami.

== Public collections ==
- Nationalgalerie, Staatliche Museen zu Berlin, Berlin, Germany
- Daimler Contemporary, Berlin, Germany
- Sammlung Boros, Berlin, Germany
- Sammlung Ingvild Goetz, Munich, Germany
- Collection Ringier, Zurich, Switzerland
- Pinault Collection, Venice, Italy
- Centre Pompidou, Paris, France
- Arken Museum of Modern Art, Ishøj, Denmark
- Leeum, Samsung Museum of Art, Seoul, South Korea
- Saatchi Gallery, London, UK
- Rubell Family Collection, Miami, USA
