= Arken Museum of Modern Art =

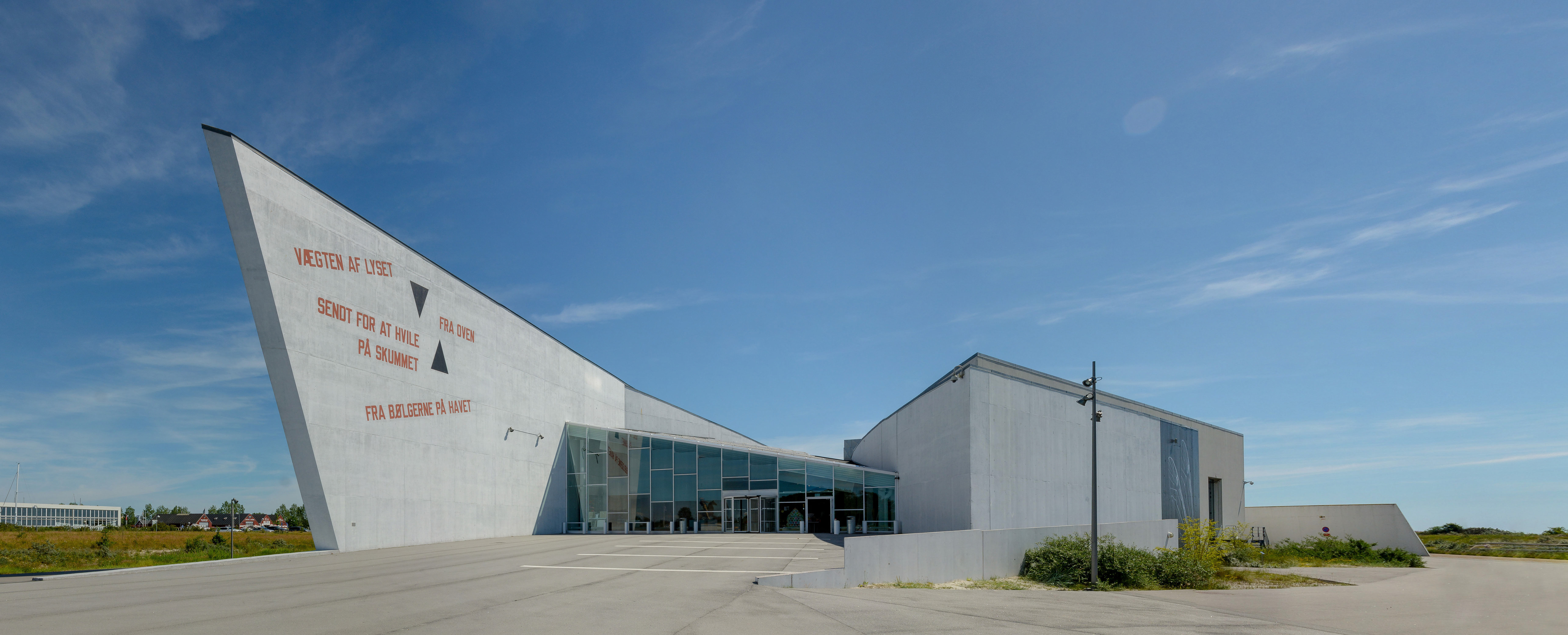
- Established: 15 March 1996; 30 years ago
- Location: Skovvej 100; Ishøj, Denmark
- Coordinates: 55.6062°N 12.3876°E
- Type: Art museum
- Director: Marie Nipper
- Architect: Søren Robert Lund
- Website: www.arken.dk

ARKEN Museum of Modern Art (Danish: ARKEN Museum for Moderne Kunst) is a state-authorised private non-profit charity and contemporary art museum in Ishøj, near Copenhagen. The museum is among Denmark's major contemporary and modern art collections, holding a variety of international cultural works and exhibitions. The museum was designed by Søren Robert Lund and was authorised by Copenhagen County. It was inaugurated on 15 March 1996 and was conceived by Queen Margrethe.

Arken Museum of Modern Art's collection contains major works of over 400 Danish, Scandinavian, and International post-war art. Arken, due to its synthesis of contemporary art, maritime architecture, and landscape, is also considered as a milestone in Danish architecture. The museum focuses on an overview of contemporary and modern art, presenting cultural and research-based exhibitions, architecture and design, sculptures, paintings, prints, site installations, and mixed-media displays.

== History, context and influences ==
Arken (Danish for 'the Ark'), was created and publicised in 1996, featuring an amassed assemble of international works.

The museum re-opened in January 2008 after major refurbishing, which included an expansion providing an additional 50% of gallery-space.

=== Conception ===
In the 20th century, there was a global growth of contemporary art museums. Collectively, this influenced a rise and a prominent increase in cultural institutions to showcase both local and international art. It has played a major role in the development and collection of contemporary art.

In 1988, an architectural competition for the creation of a new contemporary art museum in southwest of Copenhagen was held. A design put forward by Søren Robert Lund won first-prize. The name, Arken, was also chosen from the competition. The initial idea was for Arken to be located on the beach as a characteristic maritime architectural form to reflect its Danish title. However, due to conservation concerns, the museum was built further back.

Svend Jakobsen was chairman of the museum between 1997 and 2007.

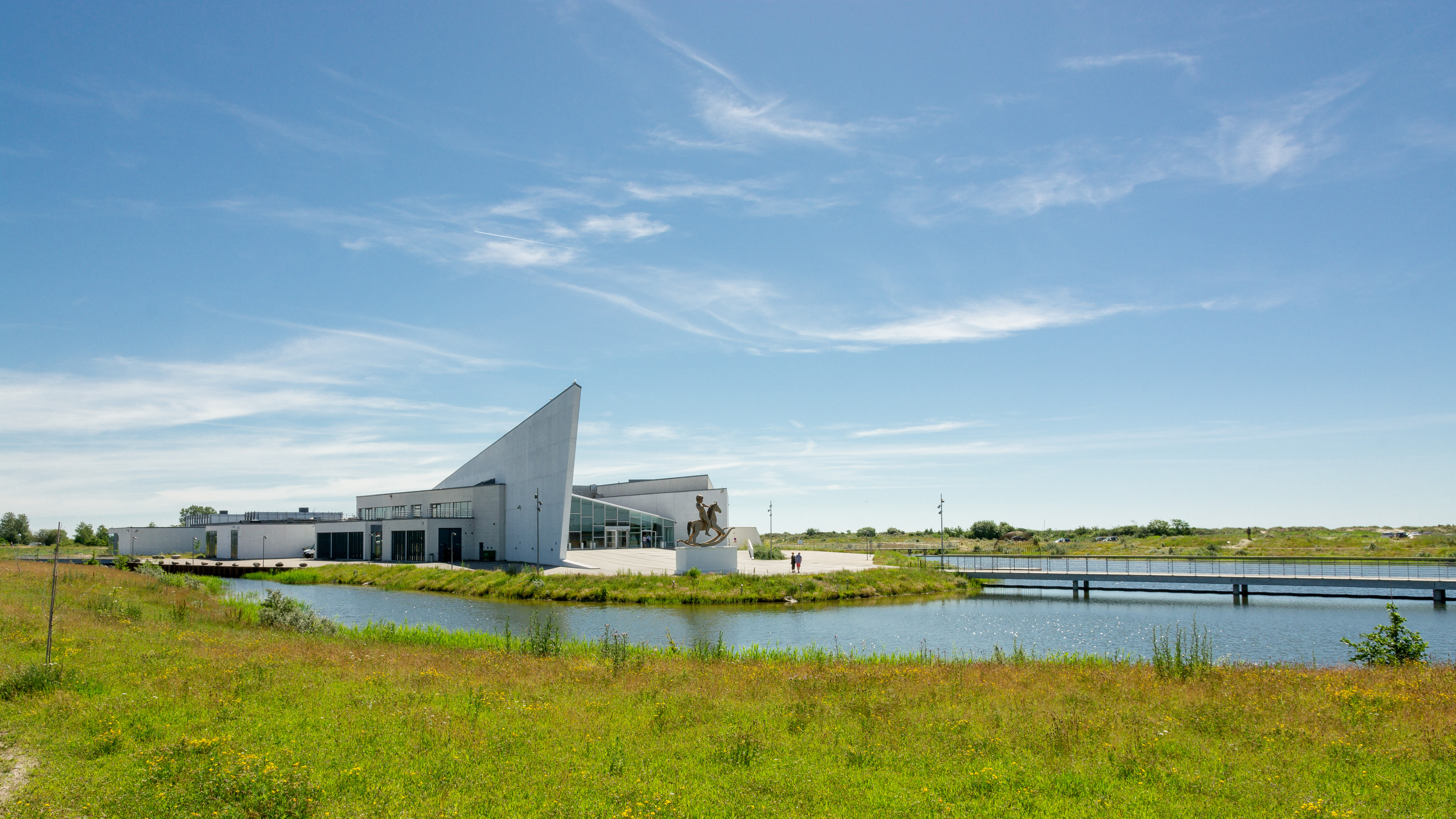
Arken Museum of Modern Art

=== 21st Century ===
Arken underwent two major renovation and expansion projects, designed by original architect Søren Robert Lund alongside C.F. Møller Architects. The museum encompassed permanent collections and donations of works from 2005 to 2008 by Damien Hirst, Marc Quinn, Mona Hatoum, Jeppe Hein, Jeff Koons, and Elmgreen & Dragset.

The museum also published the Arken Bulletin, a discussion for academics regarding artistic theory and museology.

Each year, Arken awards the ARKENs kunstpris prize– 100,000 Danish kroner– to a contemporary artist.

== Architecture ==
The museum building is deconstructive and nautically inspired.

Arken's formal plan incorporates assembled building parts, split and fragmented to create a fragmented ship form and a floor plan with slanted angles. Contrasting colours of grey to red walls, large open rooms to small rooms, and slanted building angles with curved galleries creates visible deconstructionist styles.

=== Extensions ===
Since its inauguration in 1996, the museum has undergone numerous expansions and renovations. One, in 2008, furnished the museum with an additional 50% of gallery space. The expansion allowed the museum to shift its focus on paintings, design and artworks on paper to include sculptural works.

==== Extension 1: 2008-2009 ====
Interior of ARKEN

The Museum reopened its doors publicly on 5 September 2009, following a renovation executed by Arken's original architect Søren Robert Lund and design partner, C. F. Møller Architect. The refurbishment consisted of 3 sections: a new sculpture gallery and main entrance by Søren Robert Lund, and education and experience workshop areas designed by Anna Maria Indrio of CF Møller Architects.

This extension significantly expanded Arken's new exhibit room to 1,600 square metres (17,000 sq ft), and a total area of 5,000 square metres (54,000 sq ft). The museum removed load-bearing walls or columns in all individual rooms, with the new exhibition hall structured as four white quadrants. Air conditioning structures were recessed into walls and security equipment was placed in floor boxed beneath steel plates, as C.F. Møller aimed to retain Arken's "existing facade’s rhythm and proportions."

The ceilings were lowered, and a new white box design was introduced. The annex's designer was Anna Maria Indrio, from C. F. Møller. The Annie and Otto Johs. Detlefs Foundation lent financial support to the new 1,100 square metres (12,000 sq ft) extension, both donating approximately $10 million. The Detlefs Hall was designed for displaying sculptural works. An additional extension of educational workshop rooms was incorporated and refurbished across the north side of the building. The redesigned entrance leads to a 600 square metres (6,500 sq ft) large room, functioning as the core of the museum, and being a central point for all rooms and amenities.

==== Extension 2: 2016 ====
Landscape of ARKEN

Arken's second extension was funded by Arnold Peter Møller, Hustru Chastine, and the McKinney Møller Foundation for General Purposes. The excavation of extensive areas surrounding the gallery aimed to recognise the museum's characteristic maritime architecture and the surrounding landscape as an "Island of Art." The museum was moved to an island, instead of the original plan of a beach-side placement, due to environmental conservation factors regarding ecological balance and heritage. The extension includes of three road bridges, two pedestrian bridges, lagoons, native plantations and an architectural sculptural park. The refurbishment and extension were managed by Schul Landskabsarkitekter in conjunction with Møller and Grønborg, as a "transition from nature to culture."

== Collections ==
The Museum is a home to many important international cultural pieces and notable displays from a collective assemble of over 400 artists. The collection spans from World War II to the present day, incorporating permanent installations by Damien Hirst, Olafur Eliasson, Ai Wei Wei, Ingar Dragset and Michael Elmgreen and Asger Jorn.

The museum's collection aims to incorporates two underpinning themes: modern human condition, and art that questions the essential definition of art itself, via new media, mixed-materials and sculptural forms.

=== Selected pieces ===
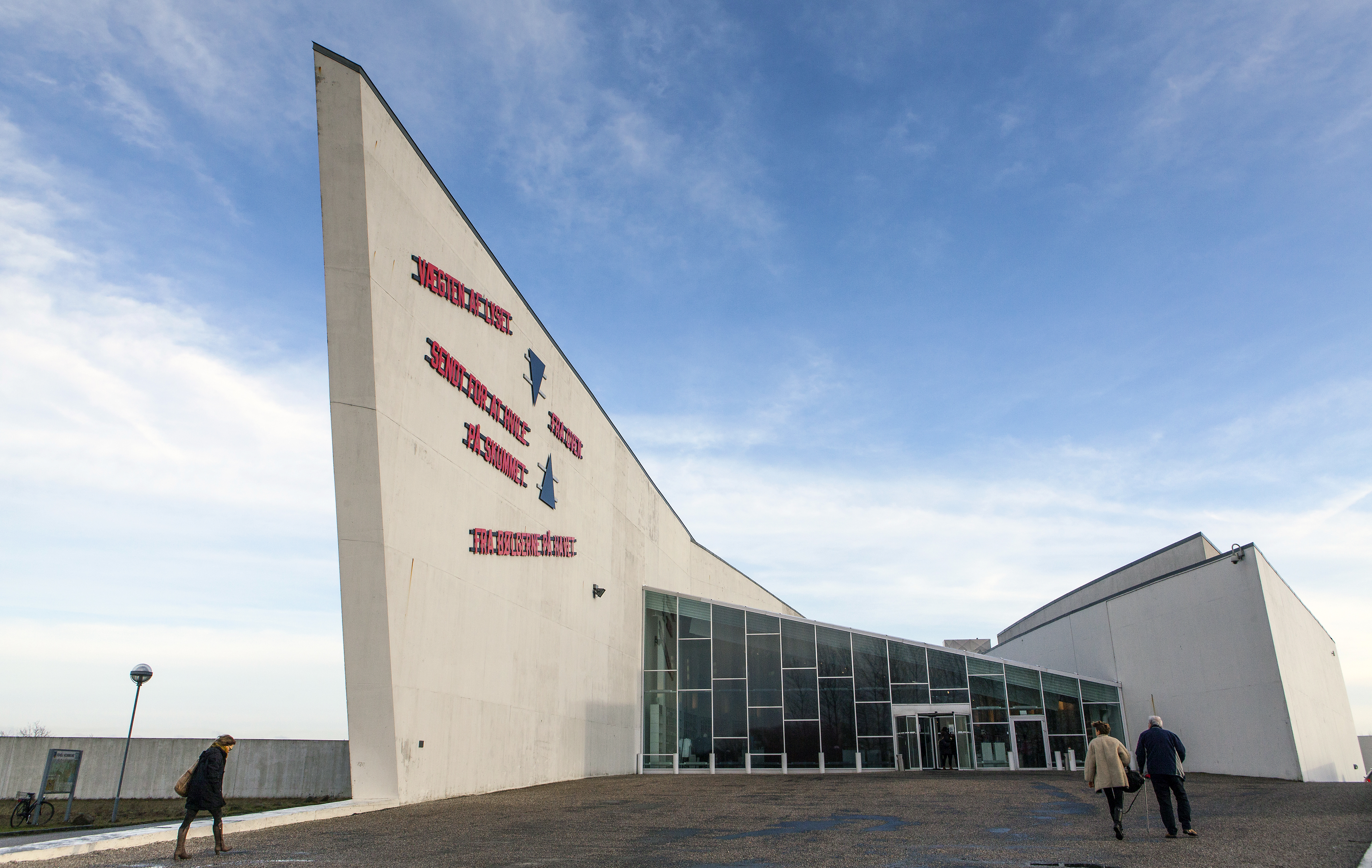
"The weight of light / from above / brought to bear on the froth / of the waves of the sea, Lawrence Weiner 2007.

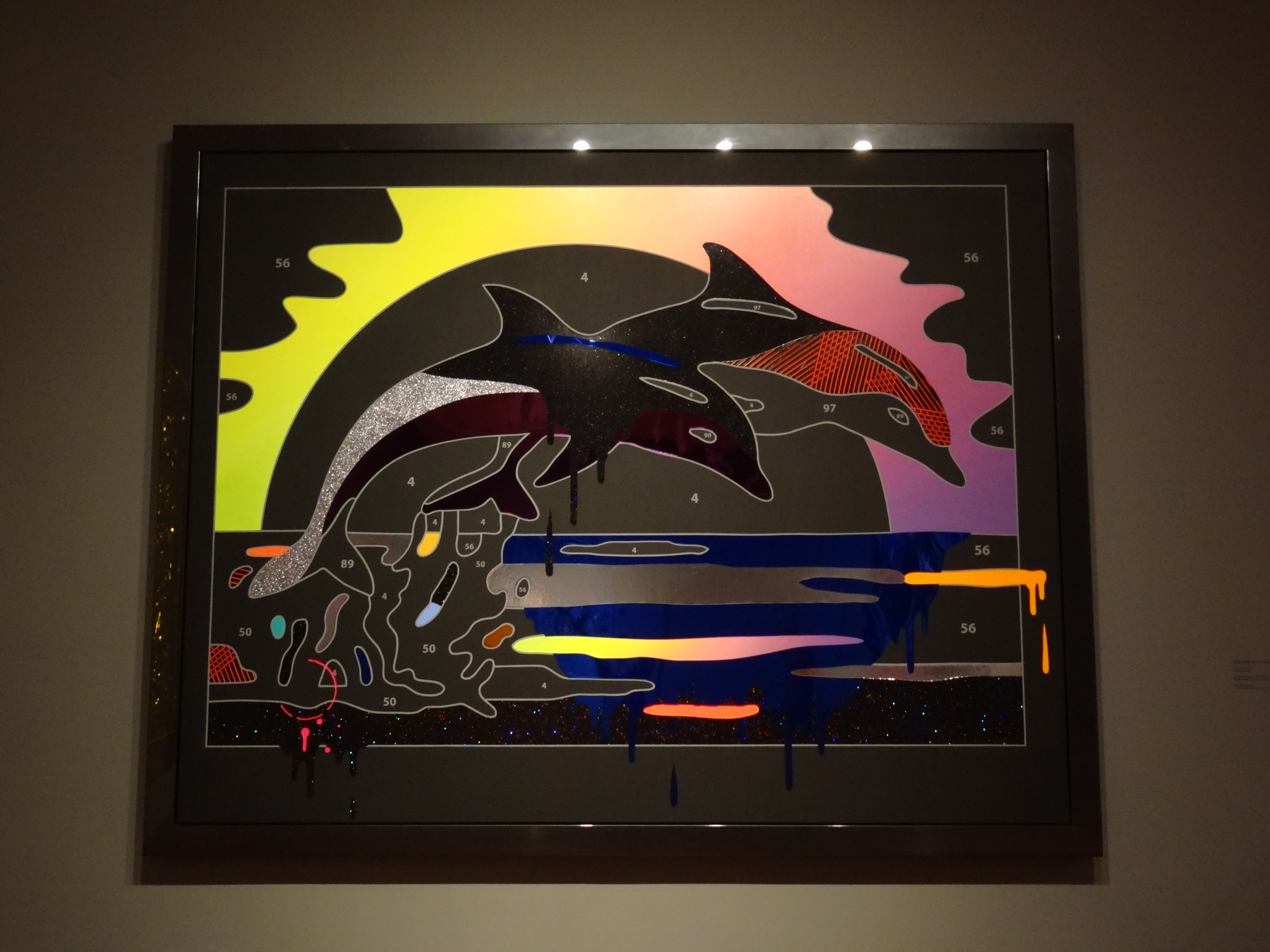
Best Friends, Anselm Reyle 2012

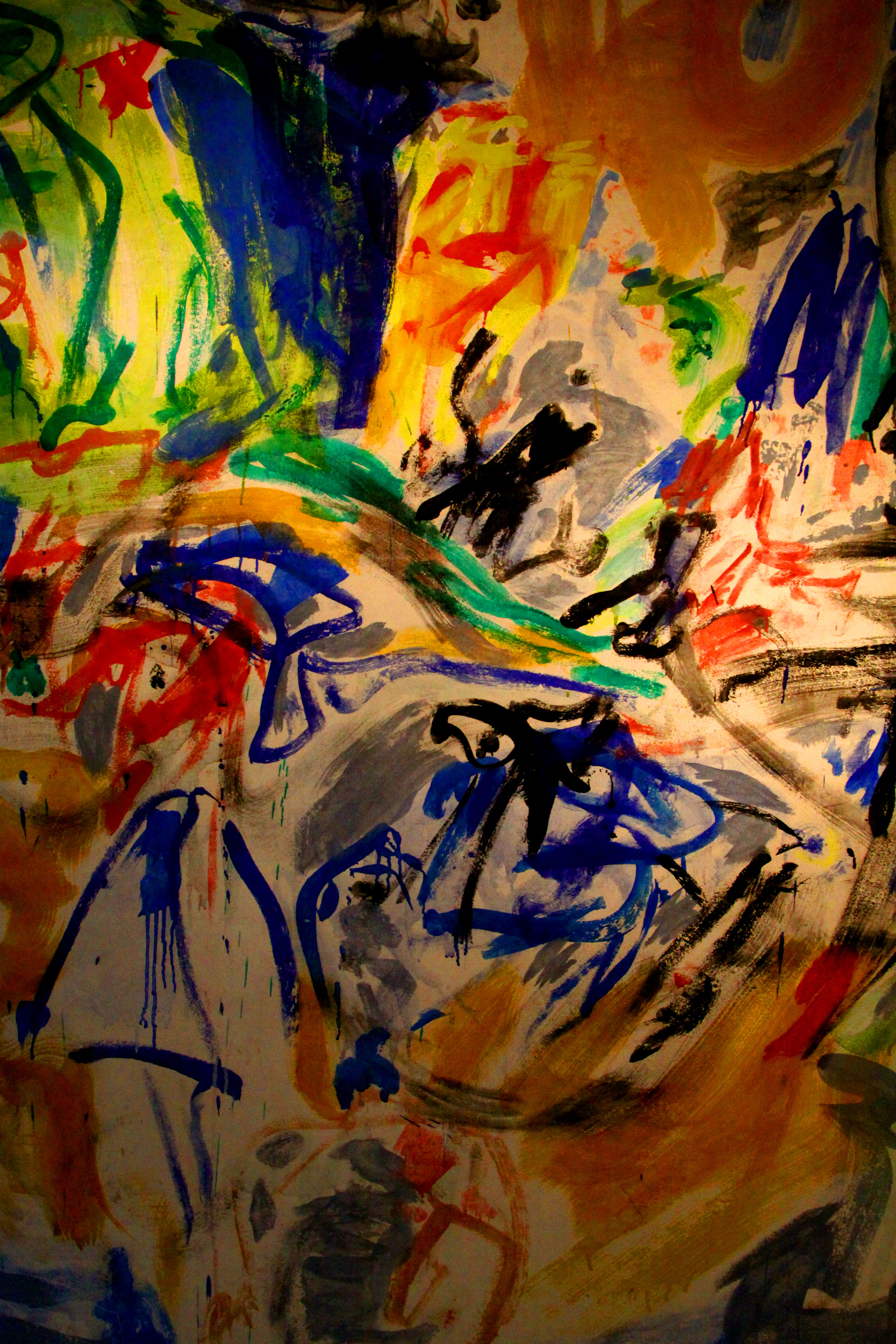
Asger Jorn

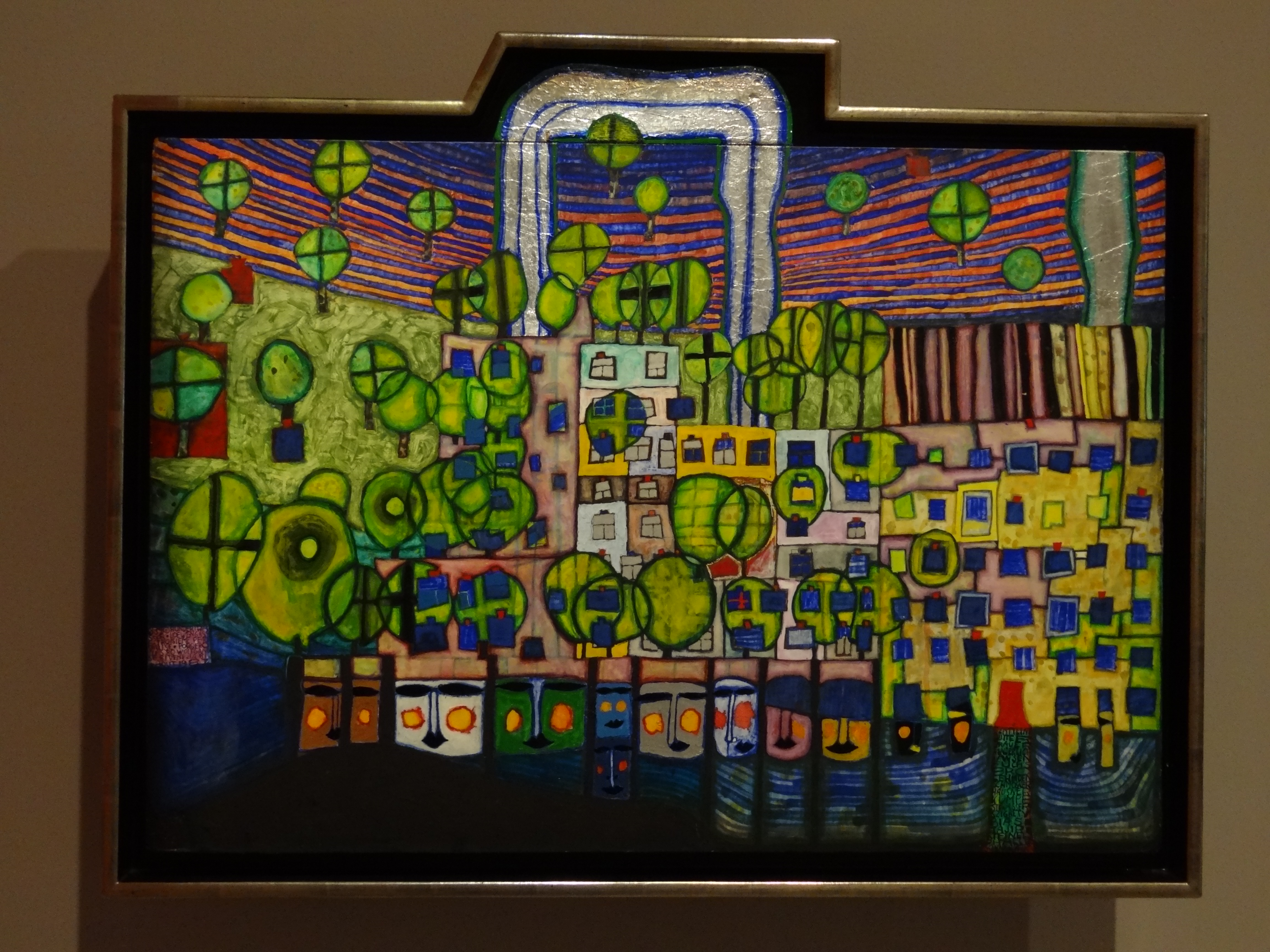
The Third Skin, Friedensreich Hundertwasser 2014

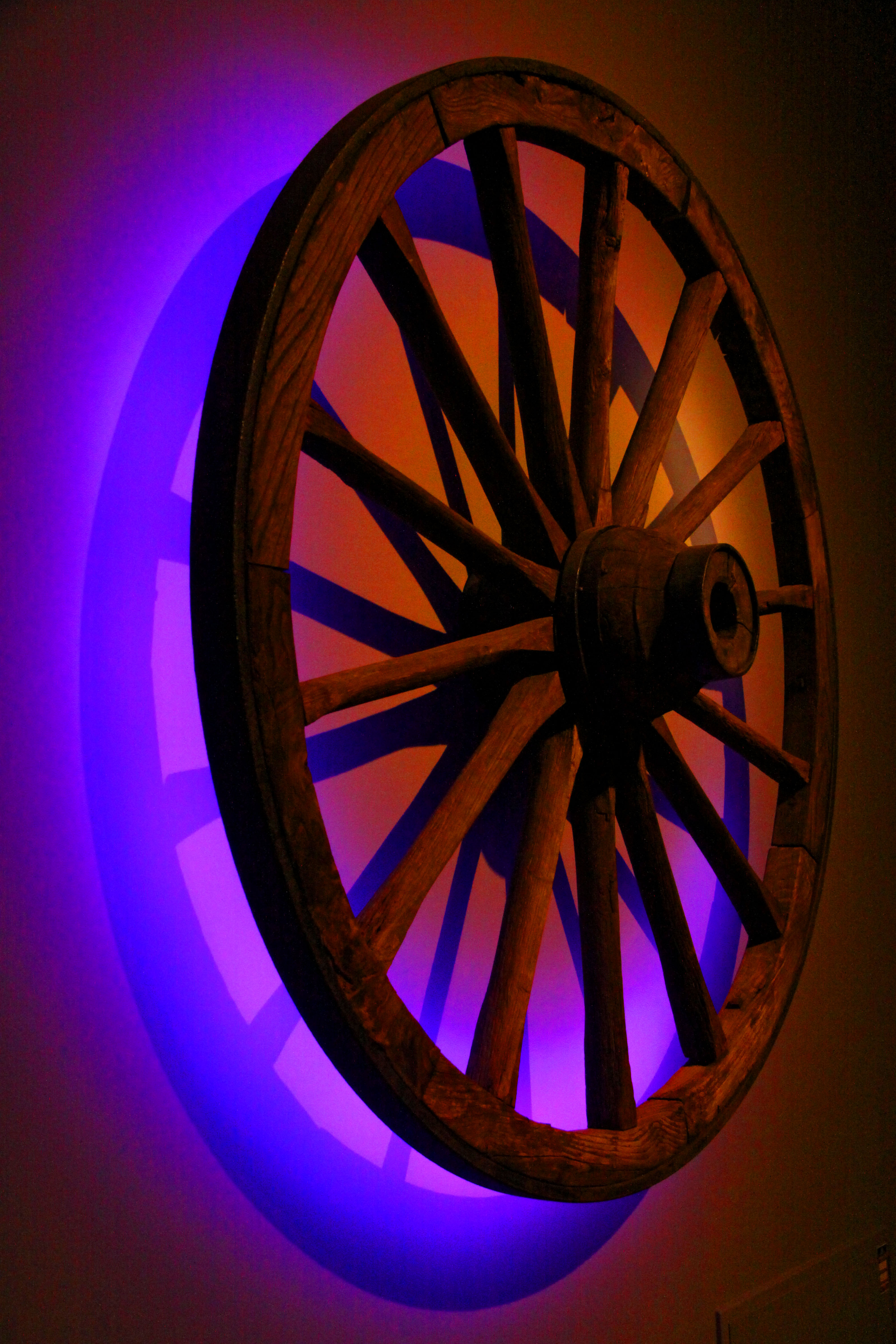
Wagon Wheel, Anselm Reyle 2009

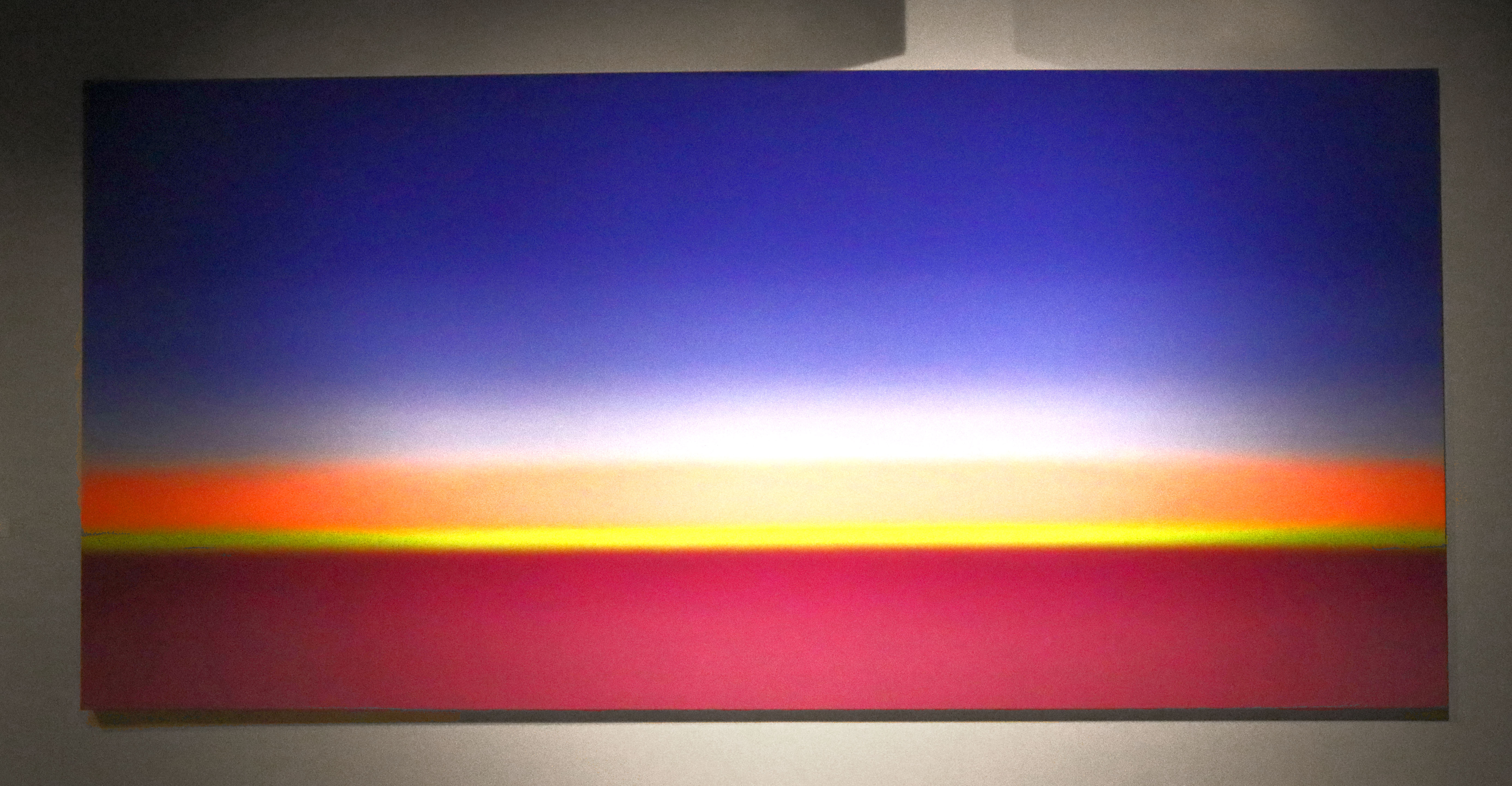
Untitled, Anselm Reyle 2010

== Exhibitions ==
The museum holds temporary annual exhibitions– usually thematic or artist-specific– to "safeguard Denmark's cultural heritage." There are on-going displays from 1996 to present.

=== UTOPIA Project ===
A research-based series of exhibitions was held in 2008–2011 at Arken Museum of Modern Art, comprising works of "A Chinese railroad, a floor and wall painting and a corridor full of fog". Each exhibition presented notable international artists, exploring the notions of "the good life" in large-scale installations. The exhibition consisted of two parts: Utopia Revisted and Utopian Positions, incorporating solo shows by Qiu Anxiong, Katharina Grosse, and Olafur Eliasson to showcase "the reformulations of utopia in contemporary art."

=== India: Art Now ===
Held between 18 August 2012 to 13 January 2013, India: Art Now was the biggest in Arken's history. It comprised Indian installation art by 13 artists and artist groups with themes of "The Urban Space", "Identity and Everyday Life" and "Self-articulation." The museum displayed large-scale installation of saris, artistic replications of street vendors and high-tech shadow plays.

=== Van Gogh ===
An exhibition held on 1 September 2018, holding 39 works by Vincent van Gogh. It was the first exhibition in over fifty years dedicated to van Gogh's paintings and drawing in Denmark. The exhibition was in collaboration with Kröller-Müller Museum, exclusively focusing on humanity, religion and nature as thematic retrospect on Van Gogh's art.

=== Young Danish Art: Forecasting the Future ===
Young Danish Art: Forecasting the Future was an exhibition from 17 August 2019 to 15 March 2020 comprising an array of sculptures, installations, animated films and structures featuring political and cultural changes in contemporary art. The exhibition presented overarching themes of "work culture, belonging and climate crisis."

=== Frederik Næblerød - All Walks of Life ===
In 2025, the museum presented the most comprehensive exhibition to date dedicated to Frederik Næblerød's practice. The exhibition attracted a record audience, resulting in a 40 percent increase in museum attendance. Spanning seven galleries, it included ceramics, paintings, bronze sculptures, and a large collage wall with photographs by Frederik Clement, who documented the artist's life and work over a three-year period. During the exhibition, Næblerød moved his studio into the museum, allowing visitors to observe his creative process. One gallery featured a reconstruction of his total installation My Friend the Wind—a beach house first realized in 2015—rebuilt from recycled materials as the final installation of the exhibition.

=== Thomas Dambo - The Garbage man ===
In 2026 the museum is hosting the first retrospective of Danish artist Thomas Dambo's troll sculptures.

== See also ==
- Køge Bugt Strandpark

== Literature ==
- "Arken - Museum of Modern Art at Ishøj, Denmark" / Henrik Sten Møller. - in Living architecture, 1997, no. 15, pp. 116–133.
- "The Arken Art Museum extension". - in Arkitektur DK, 2008, vol. 52, no. 4, pp. 32–38.
- ARKEN: The place and the art / edited by Christian Gether ... [et al.]. - Denmark, Arken Museum of Modern Art, 2016.
