= Jane Reumert =

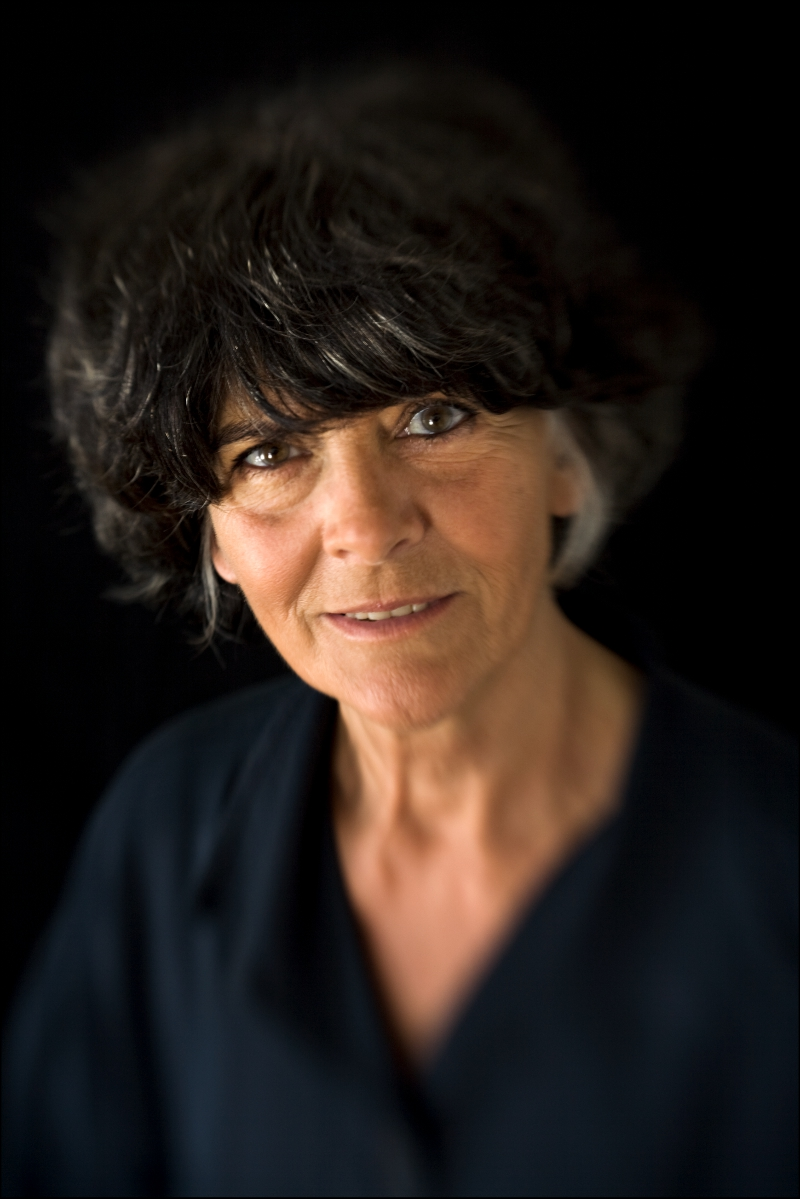
- Born: 1942; Gentofte, Denmark
- Died: 4 April 2016 (aged 73–74)
- Education: Kunsthåndværkerskolen 1960–64
- Known for: pottery, fiberglass, ceramic

Jane Reumert (1942 – 4 April 2016) was a Danish ceramist.

== Biography ==
Jane Louise Reumert was born in Gentofte, Denmark, and worked as a professional ceramist since the 1960s. Reumert's influences range from nature to calligraphy. She has stated that she was interested in nature and especially birds from her early youth. Those motives are found in her work of the 2000s. She used European and Asian calligraphic lettering styles.

In the late 1980s Reumert began working with porcelain and made thin salt glazed vessels, fired to 1330 °C. In the early 1990s, she experimented with adding fiberglass and other fibers to her clay, allowing thinner forms. She often displayed her work on wire tripods to create the illusion of the item floating in thin air. In 1994, Reumert was awarded the Torsten and Wanja Soderberg Nordic Design Prize. In 2011, she took part in the Nordic Woodfire Marathon, and was a guest artist at the International Ceramic Research Centre in Denmark.

Reumert had published writings and books on ceramic techniques and on her own work. She wrote in Danish and some of her books, including Transparency and Contemporary Pottery, have been translated into English.

In 2003, Jane Louise Reumert moved away from the island of Bornholm where she created some of her salt-glazed pieces with a gas-fired kiln to Copenhagen, where she used a wood-fired kiln.

Jane Louise Reumert was married first to Nils Jesper Refn, Nature Preservationist Danmarks Naturfredningsforening, and later to Danish artist Bo Bonfils.

== Awards ==
- 1968 Chr. Grauballes Mindelegat
- 1977 Ole Hasslunds Kunstnerlegat
- 1984 1. Price at "Internationational Exhibition of Arts and Craft" Bratislava, Tjekkoslovakiet
- 1988 Ole Hasslunds Kunstnerlegat
- 1994 Torsten and Wanja Söderberg Prize, Gothenburg
- 1998 Prince Eugen Medal, Stockholm
- 2001 Carl Jacobsen's Travel Grant, Ny Carlsbergfondet
- 2003 Niels Wessel Bagge Art Grant
- 2003 Thorvald Bindesbøll Medal, Copenhagen.

== Gallery ==
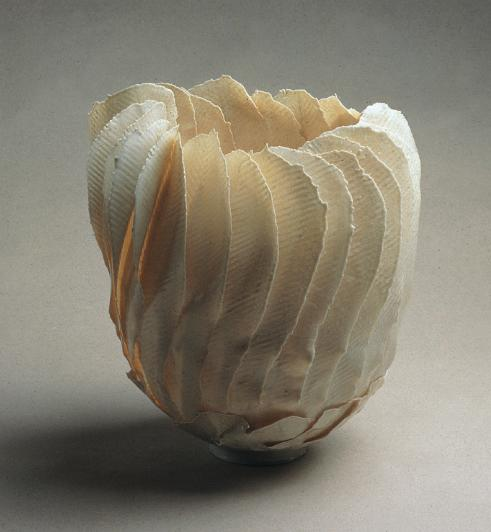
Salt glazed porcelain, H: 20 cm

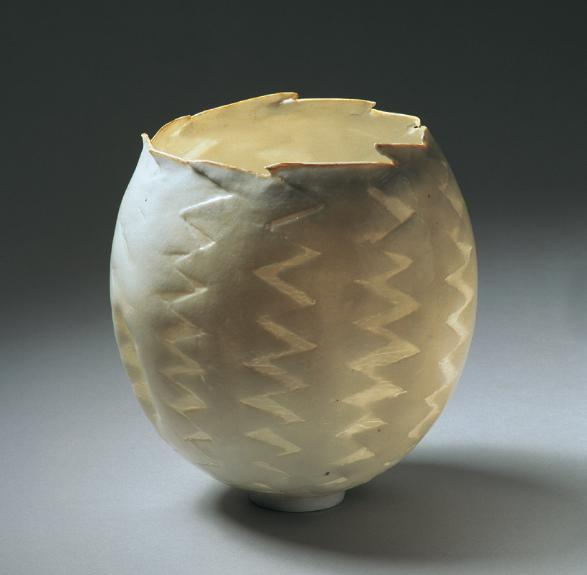
Salt glazed porcelain, "Botanik" 2009 Ø: 15 cm

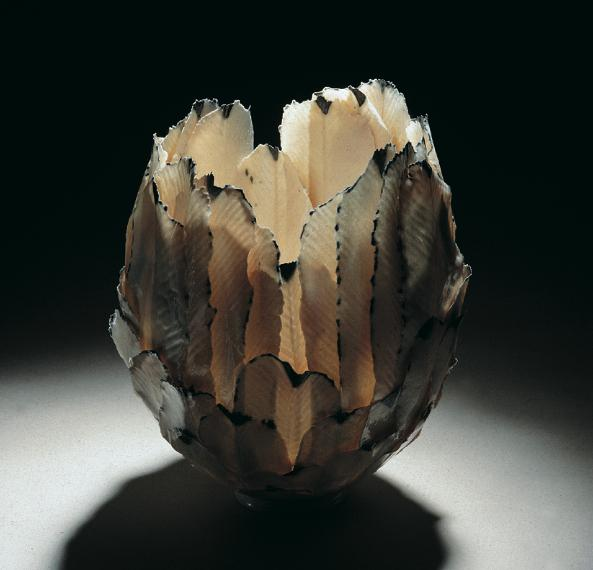
Salt glazed porcelain, "Snowy owl"

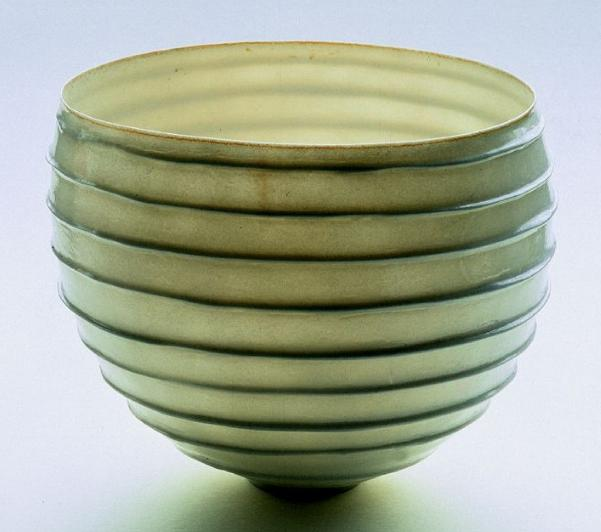
Woodfired porcelain, Ø: 20 cm

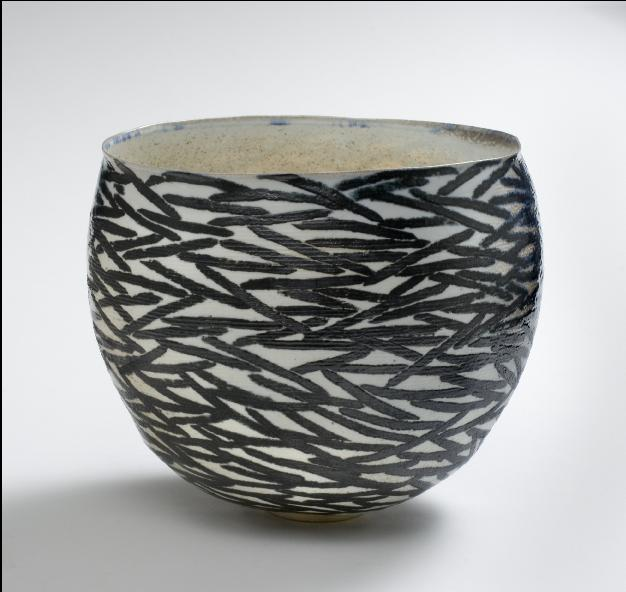
Woodfired porcelain, "Nest" 2009 Ø: 30 cm

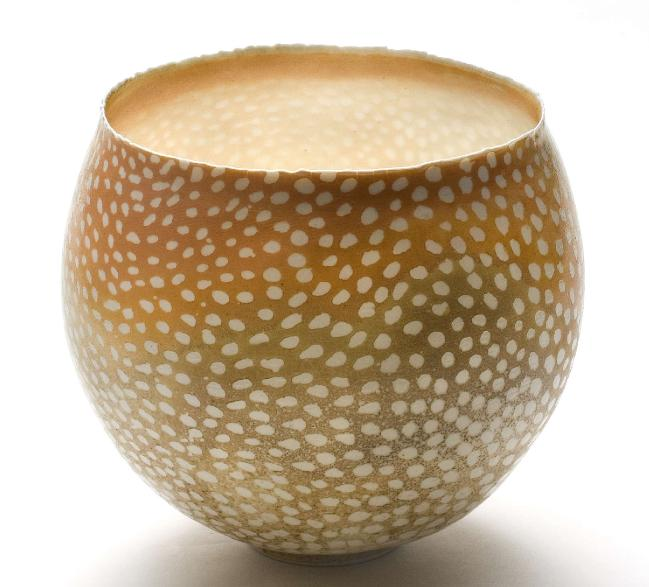
Woodfired porcelain, Ø: 18 cm

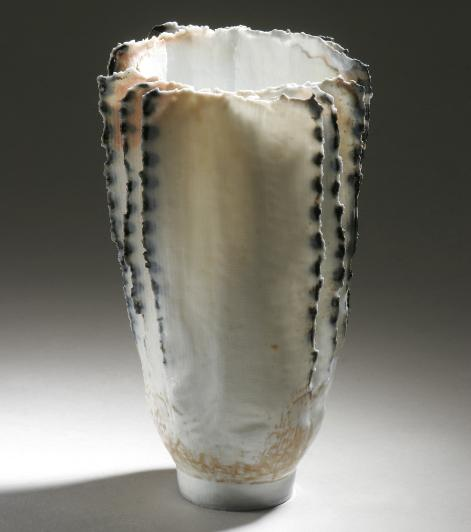
Woodfired porcelain, "Feather" H: 16 cm

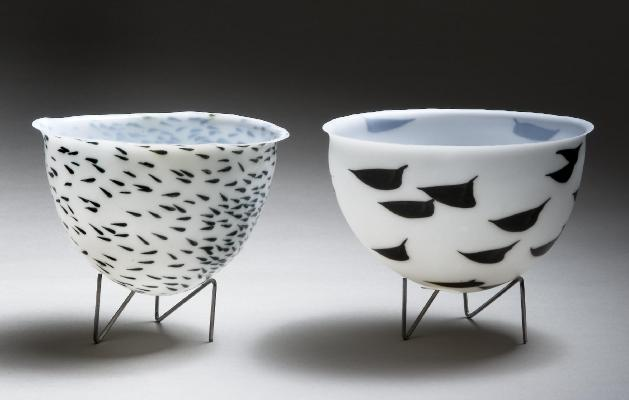
Shell porcelain, Ø: 8–9 cm

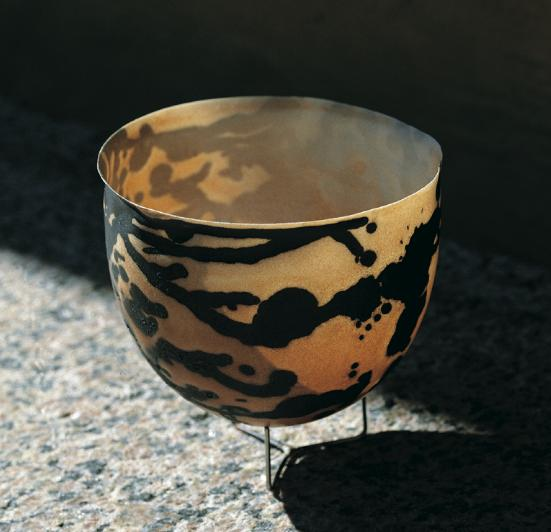
Shell porcelain, Ø: 11 cm

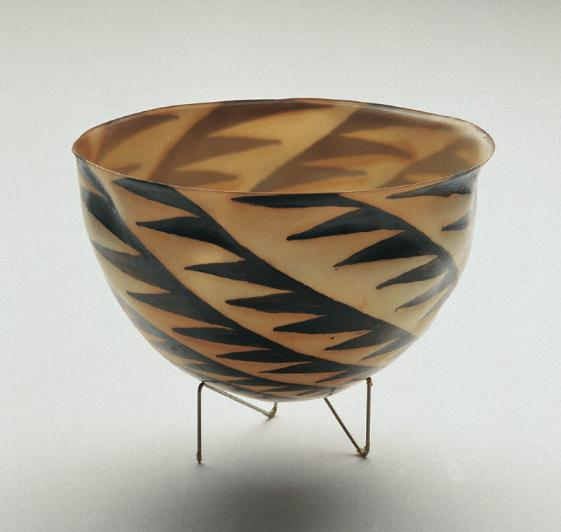
Shell porcelain, Ø: 12 cm

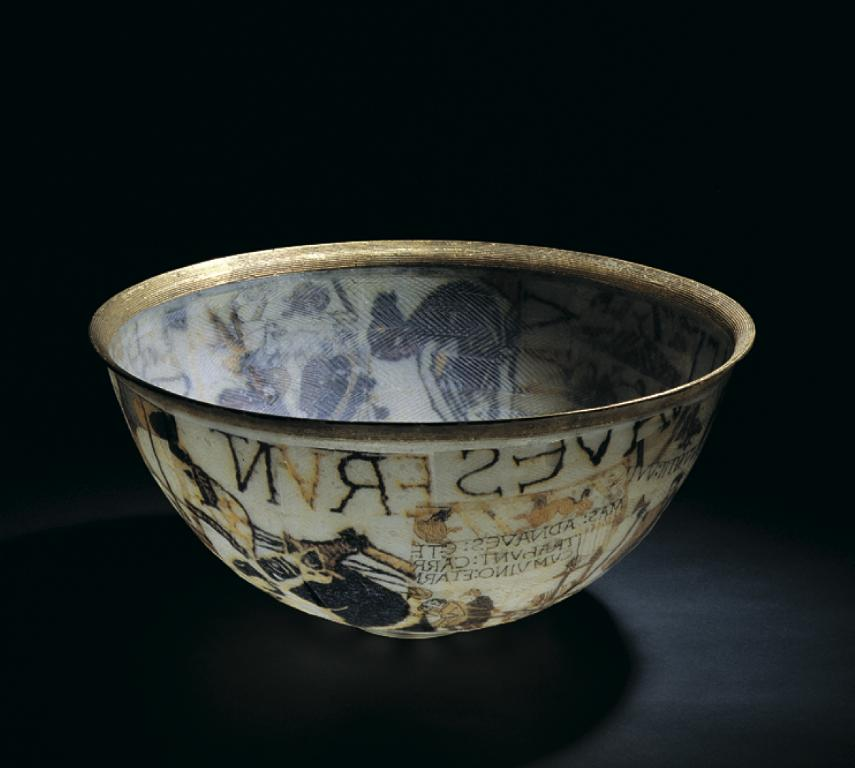
Fiberglass, "Bayeux" 1996 Ø: 67 cm

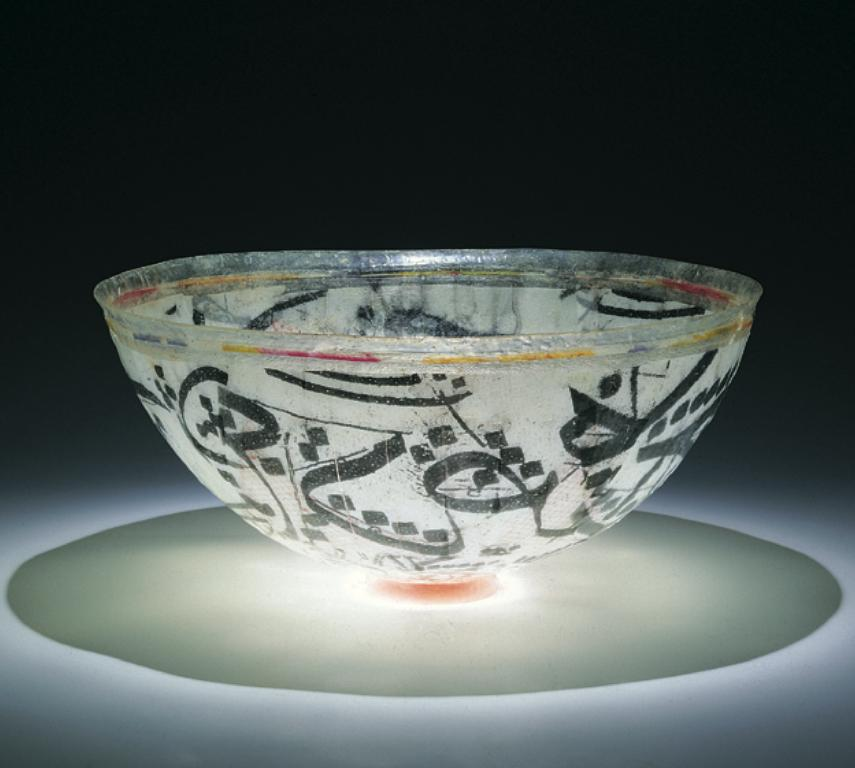
Fiberglass, "Arabic music" 1992 Ø: 85 cm

== Publications ==
- Transparency, Jane Reumert studio ceramist, ISBN 87-7407-284-6
- Strandstræde keramik – Værkstedsfællesskab i 40 år, Nyt Nordisk Forlag, ISBN 978-87-17-03758-8
