= Cathrine Raben Davidsen =

Danish artist (born 1972)

Cathrine Raben Davidsen (born 1972), is a Danish artist, who works in textiles, ceramics, printmaking, drawing, and painting. She is best known for her paintings depicting grief, in particular her portraits, which have been described as "eerie". She has cited Mamma Andersson and Kai Althoff as influences in her work, as well as her former teachers in Italy, Rose Shakinovsky and Claire Gavronsky.

Rabe Davidsen studied art in Denmark, Italy, and the Netherlands before establishing herself in Copenhagen where her work has most extensively been exhibited. She has been the recipient of a number of awards and grants. In 2015, she was made a Knight of the order of Dannebrog.

== Biography ==
Cathrine Raben Davidsen was born in Copenhagen in 1972. Her father died when she was 13; he was one of the first Danes to die of causes related to HIV/AIDS. Her grief led her to pursue painting as a means of connecting with his memory despite the stigma that surrounded his death. Her father had been a fashion designer, and initially, she made fashion illustrations in his memory. These early works were executed in oil, charcoal, and pencil and are considered to be emotional and wild in character.

From 1991 to 1992, she studied at the Lorenzo de' Medici School. She returned to Denmark and attended the University of Copenhagen from 1994 to 1995. Raben Davidsen then studied at the Vrije Academie voor Beeldende Kunsten from 1995 to 1996. After leaving the Netherlands, she began attending The Royal Danish Academy of Fine Arts in 1996 and was awarded a Master of Fine Arts in 2003.

Raben Davidsen has collaborated with the Royal Danish Ballet, where she created a scenography for the ballet Virtuosi Steps by August Bournonville. She began working with ceramics around 2010, and was invited to collaborate with Royal Copenhagen. The multimedia exhibition their collaboration produced, "Totem", was on display in 2019.

== Awards and fellowships ==
In 2004 she received funding from the Danish Arts Foundation, a grant which she would receive more than five times. She was awarded Den Danske Bogdesignpris in 2008. In 2009, she received the Grant of Honour from the Niels Wessel Bagge Art Foundation and the silver Creative Circle Award for her project White Ink. She has also received grants from the Beckett Foundation, L. F. Foghts Foundation, the Toyota Foundation, and Oda og Hans Svenningsens Fond.

In 2015, Raben Davidsen was appointed a Knight of the order of Dannebrog by Queen Margrethe II. In 2022, she was awarded the inaugural Beckett Prize in recognition of her original compositions as a painter.

== Selected solo exhibitions ==
- The Harlequin Set, Martin Asbæk Gallery, Copenhagen, 2013
- Trickster, Litografisk, Valby, Denmark, 2013
- House of The Ax, GL STRAND, Copenhagen, 2012
- The Inkwell, Trapholt Museum of Modern Art, Kolding, Denmark, 2010
- Remote Control, Martin Asbæk Gallery, Copenhagen, 2009
- White Ink, Horsens Museum of Art, Horsens, Denmark, 2008
- Voice of the Shuttle, Schäfer Grafisk Værksted, Copenhagen, 2007
- Voice of the Shuttle. Permanent public wall painting at Nimb, Copenhagen, 2007
- Meta Morphoses, Sorø Kunstmuseum, Sorø, Denmark, 2006
- Penelopes Web, Martin Asbæk Gallery, Copenhagen, 2006
- Heroides, Ama Gallery, Turku, Finland, 2005
- Pen Pencil Poison, Horsens Museum of Art, Horsens, Denmark, 2003

== Selected group exhibitions ==
- 10.000 Hours, Trapholt Museum of Modern Art, Kolding, DK, 2014
- The Nordic Influence, curated by Glenn Adamson, MAD, Museum of Art and Design/ represented by Vance Trimble,
  Collective2/Designfair, New York, 2014
- På Kant med Kierkegaard, Holstebro Kunstmuseum, Denmark, 2014
- SHOWcabinet: Maison Martin Margiela, SHOWstudio, London, UK, 2013
- Zeigen: Karin Sander, Nikolaj Kunsthal, Copenhagen, 2013
- På Kant med Kierkegaard, The National Museum of Denmark, 2013
- Betroet Tvivl, The Vejen Art Museum, Denmark, 2013
- Andratx on Paper, CCA Andratx Kunsthalle for Contemporary Art, Mallorca, Spain, 2013
- MARKET Stockholm, represented by Martin Asbæk Gallery, Stockholm, Sweden, 2013
- WONDERS – Masterpieces from Private Collections in Denmark, KUNSTEN, Museum of Modern Art Aalborg, Denmark, 2012
- A Journey Through A Nordic Fairytale, Pop Up Space, Guided By in Voices, Chelsea, New York City, 2012
- Ten years of DANSK, Dansk Design Center, Copenhagen, 2012
- Art Moves, GL. STRAND, Copenhagen, 2011
- 1–4. A Private Collection of Contemporary Art, ACC Showroom, Copenhagen, 2011
- Hp & Jo 07, Litografisk, Valby, Denmark, 2007
- Groupshow with gallery artists, Martin Asbæk Gallery, Copenhagen, 2007

== Selected monographs ==
- Pen, Pencil, Poison (in Danish). Horsens: Horsens Kunstmuseum. 2003. ISBN 9788788985726.
- Raben Davidsen, Cathrine; Smaldone, Andrew (2006). Penelopes Web. Martin Asbaek Gallery. ISBN 9788788223576.
- Raben Davidsen, Cathrine; Dambsbo, Mads (2008). White Ink (in Danish). Horsens Kunstmuseum. OCLC 1073461999.
- Behrndt, Helle; Hatla Krogsgaard, Sara (2012). House of The Ax. Copenhagen: GL STRAND. Texts by Helle Behrnt, Sara Hatla, 2012. Copenhagen: Kunstforeningen Gl. Strand. OCLC 927269816.
- Raben Davidsen, Cathrine (2014). Deco Mannequin: Selected Works 2005–2013. Leipzig: Lubok Verlag. ISBN 9783941601246.
- Raben Davidsen, Cathrine; Hatla Krogsgaard, Sara (2016). Laying on of Hands. Leipzig: Lubok Verlag. ISBN 9783945111260.
- Raben Davidsen, Cathrine; Laurberg, Marie (2022). Above, Below, Beyond: Works 2019–2022 (in Danish). Copenhagen: CRD Studio. ISBN 9788797113332.
- Rabe Davidsen, Cathrine; Laurberg, Marie (2022). Grafik Lithographs, Etchings, Cyanotypes, and Monotypes, 1998–2022. Copenhagen: CRD Studio. ISBN 9788799676057.
