= Trine Søndergaard =

Danish artist (born 1972)

Trine Søndergaard (born 1972), is a Danish photography-based visual artist. Trine Søndergaard lives and works in Copenhagen, Denmark.

Søndergaard studied drawing and painting in Aalborg and Copenhagen from 1992 to 1994 and attended the photography school Fatamorgana in Copenhagen, Denmark.

Søndergaard’s work is marked by her precision and sensibility that co-exist with the medium of photography, its boundaries and what constitutes an image. She has received the Eckersberg Medal, the Albert Renger-Patzsch Prize and the three-year working grant from the Danish Arts Foundation

The landscapes and mirrorings of memory, silent inner rooms, and women’s occupations and roles through history are all themes in Søndergaard’s works. In her photographic series she portrays rooms, landscapes, vegetation and people. With repetition and small displacements she lets the vision stop and wonder. The works create a kind of gap, a clearing in the existence, in which all stands out in an almost extreme concentration. Søndergaard says: “With my camera I listen to reality”.

In her work, Søndergaard’s starting point is documentary and straight photography. However, her use of reduction and repetition transforms the work into a kind of conceptual photography, and the dialogue with art history is always present in her oeuvre. The ordinary and the ceremonious are presented equally, and the undercurrents of melancholy, loss and the image as a condition transcending the verbal also characterize her work.

Søndergaard has exhibited all over the world and is represented in several international collections among others Montreal Museum of Fine Art, Canada, The J. Paul Getty Museum, USA, MUSAC, Spain, Gothenburg Museum of Art, Sverige, Nasjonalmuseet, Norway, The Israel Museum, Israel, Maison Européenne de la Photographie, France and AROS, Denmark.

Søndergaard is represented by Martin Asbæk Gallery, Copenhagen, and Jackson Fine Art, Atlanta, US.

== Publications ==
- 203 WORKS by Trine Søndergaard. FabrikBooks and Gotheburg Museum of Art, 2020, ISBN 978-87-998207-7-1
- HOVEDTØJ by Trine Søndergaard. FabrikBooks 2020, ISBN 978-87-998207-6-4
- A ROOM INSIDE by Trine Søndergaard. Fabrikbooks 2017, ISBN 978-87-998207-2-6
- STASIS by Trine Søndergaard. Hatje Cantz, Germany, December 2013, ISBN 978-3-7757-3780-7
- STRUDE by Trine Søndergaard. Museum Kunst der Westküste, Germany, 2012, ISBN 978-3-9812969-9-0
- DYING BIRDS by Trine Søndergaard & Nicolai Howalt. Hassla Books, New York, November 2010, ISBN 978-0-9825471-4-4
- HOW TO HUNT by Trine Søndergaard & Nicolai Howalt. Hatje Cantz, Germany, October 2010, ISBN 978-3-7757-2722-8
- STRUDE by Trine Søndergaard. Ny Carlsberg Glyptotek, Denmark, 2010, ISBN 978-87-7452-314-7
- MONOCHROME PORTRAITS by Trine Søndergaard. Hatje Cantz, Germany, 2009, ISBN 978-3-7757-2614-6
- TREEZONE by Trine Søndergaard & Nicolai Howalt. Hassla Books, New York, January 2009, ISBN 978-0-9800935-6-8
- HOW TO HUNT by Trine Søndergaard & Nicolai Howalt. ArtPeople, Denmark, 2005, ISBN 87-91518-96-2
- VERSUS by Trine Søndergaard. Thorvaldsens Museum, Denmark, 2003, ISBN 87-7521-098-3
- NOW THAT YOU ARE MINE by Trine Søndergaard. Steidl, Germany, 2002, ISBN 3-88243-823-1

== Exhibitions ==
=== Solo exhibitions ===
- 2026 Coordinates of Within, Snø Galleri, Norway
- 2024 Season of Undefined, Martin Asbæk Gallery, Denmark
- 2023 Blind Side, Umbrella West Coast Exhibitions, Nørre Nebel, Denmark
- 2023 Works, CCA Andratx, Mallorca, Spain
- 2022 Faraway Nearby, Greve Museum, Denmark
- 2022 Untitled / Til Vægs, Copenhagen, Denmark
- 2021 Undisclosed, Martin Asbæk Gallery, Denmark
- 2021 Works, Den Sorte Diamant, Denmark
- 2021 Nearly Now, Gl. Holtegaard, Denmark
- 2020 Works, Dunkers Kulturhus, Sweden
- 2020 148 Works, Göteborg Kunstmuseum, Sweden
- 2019 From Where We Stand, Skive Museum, Denmark
- 2019 Still, Maison du Danemark, France
- 2019 Guldnakke, SCAD FASH Museum of Fashion & Film, Atlanta, USA
- 2019 Nearer the Time, Martin Asbæk Gallery, Denmark
- 2018 Still, MuMa-Le Havre, France
- 2018 A Reflection, Bruce Silverstein Gallery, New York, USA
- 2017 Vakuum, Brandts13, Denmark
- 2016 Guldnakke, Jackson Fine Art, Atlanta, USA
- 2015 A Room Inside, Martin Asbæk Gallery, Denmark
- 2013 Birds, Trees and Hunting Scenes, N.Howalt & T.Søndergaard, Kunsthal Nord, Aalborg, Denmark
- 2013 Trine Søndergaard & Nicolai Howalt, Bruce Silverstein Gallery, New York, USA
- 2013 Stasis, Ffotogallery, Cardiff, England
- 2013 Monochrome Portraits, Hagedorn Foundation Gallery, Atlanta, USA
- 2012 Still, Martin Asbæk Gallery, København, Denmark
- 2012 Strude, Museum Kunst der Westkuste, Alkersum/Föhr, Germany
- 2011 Memento, Bildkultur, Stuttgart, Germany
- 2011 Strude, Kunstmuseet i Tønder, Denmark
- 2011 Blyge blikk, Adolp Tidemand & Trine Søndergaard, National Museum, Norway
- 2010 Monochrome Portraits, City Art Museum, Ljubljana, Slovenia
- 2010 Strude II, Trine Søndergaard, Galleri Kant, Fanø, Denmark
- 2010 Trine Søndergaard, Bruce Silverstein Gallery, New York City
- 2010 Monochrome Portraits, Nessim Gallery, Budapest, Hungary
- 2010 Strude, Ny Carlsberg Glyptotek, Copenhagen, Denmark
- 2009 Mono, Galleri Image, Aarhus, Denmark
- 2009 Monochrome Portraits, Martin Asbæk Gallery, Copenhagen, Denmark
- 2008 Trine Søndergaard, Galleri Kant, Sønderho, Denmark
- 2003 Now That You Are Mine, Filosofgangen, Odense, Denmark (catalogue)
- 2003 Versus, Thorvaldsens Museum, Copenhagen, Denmark (catalogue)
- 2001 Now That You Are Mine, The National Photo Institute of the Nederlands, Rotterdam, The Netherlands
- 2000 Now That You Are Mine, IFSAK, Istanbul, Turkey
- 1998 Neighbours, International Meetings of Photography, Plovdiv, Bulgaria
- 1996 Kom de bagfra, Kanonhallen, Copenhagen, Denmark

=== Solo exhibitions: Trine Søndergaard & Nicolai Howalt ===
- 2011 How to Hunt, Maison du Danemark, Paris
- 2011 How to Hunt, Galleri Format, Sweden
- 2010 How to Hunt, ARoS, Aarhus Kunstmuseum, Arhus, Denmark
- 2009 Tree Zone, Volta, New York City
- 2007 How to Hunt, Fotografins Hus, Stockholm, Sweden
- 2007 Hunting Grounds, The Parisian Laundry, Mois de la Photo, Montreal, Canada (catalogue)
- 2007 How to Hunt, Bruce Silverstein Gallery, New York City
- 2006 Statement, ParisPhoto, Paris, France (catalogue)
- 2006 How to Hunt, Gallery Poller, Frankfurt, Germany
- 2006 How to Hunt, Faaborg Museum of Fine Art, Faaborg, Denmark (catalogue)
- 2005 How to Hunt, Martin Asbæk Projects, Copenhagen, Denmark

=== Group exhibitions ===
- 2026 Kropp, Ideal, Blick, Fritte, Gothenburg Museum of Art, Sweden
- 2026 Every Stone Must Be Turned, Skovgaard Museet, Denmark
- 2025 Grønningen, Den Frie Udstillingsbygning, Denmark
- 2025 La Maison du Danemark, France
- 2025 Needle & Thread, Craft in Art, Sorø Art Museum, Denmark
- 2025 Homage to Older Women, Billboard Festival, Copenhagen, Denmark
- 2024 This Is How We Look, Is This Who We Are? Alzueta Gallery, Spain
- 2024 Needle & Thread, Craft in Art, Brandts, Denmark
- 2024 In the Now, Brooklyn Museum, USA
- 2023 Grønningen, Den Frie Udstillingsbygning, Denmark
- 2023 Baltic Sea Biennale. The Democratic Space, Kunsthalle Rostock, Germany
- 2023 Forsvindinger, Fotografisk Center, Denmark
- 2023 HolkaHesten, Gudhjem, Denmark
- 2023 Premises, Martin Asbæk Gallery, Denmark
- 2022 JUBILÆUM 4, Ringsted Galleriet, Denmark
- 2022 CAT, Specta, Denmark
- 2022 Landscapes, Kunstmuseum Brandts, Denmark
- 2022 Snowflakes and Other Surprises, Fotografisk Center, Denmark
- 2021 Grønningen, Den Frie Udstillingsbygning, Denmark
- 2021 In Reality – Fotografisk Center 25 Years, Fotografisk Center, Denmark
- 2020 Le Delta – Province de Namur, Belgium
- 2020 Face to Face, Thorvaldsens Museum, Denmark
- 2020 Doors in Contemporary Art, Städtische Galerie, Germany
- 2020 Calm before the storm, Art from the Wadden Sear, Ribe Kunstmuseum, Denmark
- 2020 Grønningen, Den Frie Udstillingsbygning, Denmark
- 2020 Ansigt til Ansigt - Portrætkunst i dag, Kunstetagerne Denmark
- 2019 Danish Conceptual Photography, Silver Street Studios, Texas, USA
- 2019 Grønningen, Gl Strand, Denmark
- 2018 Cool, Calm, Collected, AROS, Denmark
- 2018 Elmgreen & Dragset, Trine Søndergaard, Chan-Hyo Bae, Bærum Kunsthal, Norway
- 2018 Form Follows Fiction, Kejatan Gallery, Berlin, Germany
- 2018 Reload, Museum Kunst der Westküste, Föhr, Germnany
- 2018 Grønningen, Den Frie Udstillingsbygning, Denmark
- 2017 Theses, Stiftung Christliche Kunst, Wittenberg, Germany
- 2016 Photography from Northern Western Europe, Fondazione Fotografia Modena, Italy
- 2015 Femina, Pavillon du Vendome, Paris, France
- 2015 Grønningen 100 år, Den Frie Udstillingsbygning, Copenhagen
- 2014 Bikuben, Utah Museum of Contemporary Art, USA
- 2014 Contemporary Art from Denmark, European Central Bank, Frankfurt, Germany
- 2014 Art and Coast, Museum Kunst der Westküste, Föhr, Germany
- 2014 Still Life, Charlotte Fogh Gallery, Denmark
- 2013 Everyone Carries a Room Inside, Museum on the Seam, Jerusalem, Israel
- 2013 Nyförvärv, Göteborgs Konstmuseum, Sweden
- 2013 Nordic Art Station, Eskilstuna, Sweden
- 2013 Das Nahe und die Ferne, Künstlerhaus Dortmund, Germany
- 2013 Cool Nordic, The Kennedy Center, Washington, USA
- 2012 New Nordic, Louisiana Museum of Modern Art, Denmark
- 2011 L’Enigme du portrait, Musée d’Art Contemporain, Marseille, France
- 2011 Kiyosato Museum of Photographic Arts, Japan
- 2011 Danmark Under Forvandling, Heart Herning Museum of Art, Denmark
- 2010 Grønningen
- 2010 Danmark Under Forvandling, Museum of Photographic Art, Odense, Denmark (catalog)
- 2010 X-Tra Light, Kant Esbjerg, Denmark
- 2010 I Love You, ARoS Aarhus Museum of Art, Aarhus, Denmark (catalogue)
- 2010 This Way 10, Museum of Photographic Art, Odense, Denmark
- 2009 Altid som aldrig før, Skagen Art Museum, Skagen, Denmark (catalogue)
- 2009 D-Stop, O’born Contemporary, Toronto, Canada
- 2008 Present Perfect Portraits, Martin Asbæk Projects, Denmark
- 2007 Reality Crossings, Wilhelm Hack Museum, 2. Fotofestival, Mannheim/Ludwigs/Heidelberg, Germany
- 2006 I Skumringen, Galleri Larm, Copenhagen, Denmark
- 2006 Scandinavian Photography, Houston, USA (catalogue)
- 2006 New Photography, Scandinavia House, New York City (catalogue)
- 2006 Closed Eyes, Museum of Photographic Art, Odense, Denmark
- 2006 The Open Book, The National Museum of Photography, Copenhagen, Denmark (catalogue)
- 2005 Scandinavian Photography, Faulconer Gallery, Iowa, USA (catalogue)
- 2006 Emergencias, Musac, Museo de Arte contemporaneo de Castilla y Leon, Spain (catalogue)
- 2005 Young Portfolio Acquisition 2004, The Kiyosato Museum of Photographic Arts, Japan (catalogue)
- 2004 Body, Galleri GimEis, Copenhagen, Denmark (catalogue)
- 2004 Pro, Charlottenborg, Copenhagen, Denmark
- 2004 Kvinder stiller skarpt, Dannerhuset, Copenhagen, Denmark
- 2003 Fra objektiv til objekt, Den Fri Udstillingsbygning, Copenhagen, Denmark
- 2003 Making Eyes, Fotografisk Center, Copenhagen, Denmark, (catalogue)
- 2003 www.woman2003.dk, billboard exhibition, Copenhagen/Malmø, Denmark/Sweden (catalogue)
- 2002 Never Ending Story, billboard exhibition, Copenhagen, Denmark
- 2001 Faces And Figures, Scandinavian House, New York City
- 2001 Repor På En Slat Yta, Hasselblad Center, Göteborg, Sweden
- 2001 Scrathes on A Smooth Surface, Hasselblad Center, Göteborg, Sweden
- 2001 Spejlkabinettet, Museum of Art Photography, Odense, Denmark
- 1999 Young Danish Photography, Fotografisk Center, Copenhagen, Denmark (catalogue)
- 1999 From The Hidden, The National Museum of Photography, Copenhagen, Denmark
- 1999 Modern Times, Hasselblad Center, Göteborg, Sweden (catalogue)
- 1998 1000 år 10, Museum for Contemporary Art, Roskilde, Denmark
- 1997 PRO – Nu da du er min, Charlottenborg, Copenhagen, Denmark (catalogue)
- 1996 Fra alle os til alle jer, Albertlund Rådhus, Albertslund, Denmark

=== Group exhibitions: Trine Søndergaard & Nicolai Howalt ===
- 2024 Vild nok. Jagt i dansk kunst, Skovgaard Museet, Denmark
- 2024 Vildt nok. Jagt i dansk kunst, Faaborg Museum, Denmark
- 2023 Vild nok. Jagt i dansk kunst, Fuglsang Kunstmuseum, Denmark
- 2023 Vildt nok. Jagt i dansk kunst, Ribe Kunstmuseum, Denmark
- 2023 Snowflakes and Other Surprises, Northern Photographic Centre, Finland
- 2022 Snowflakes and Other Surprises, Landskrona Foto, Sweden
- 2022 Snowflakes and Other Surprises, Fotografisk Center, Denmark
- 2013 Flora Danica, Natural History Museum of Denmark, Copenhagen, Denmark
- 2012 Lys over Lolland, Denmark
- 2012 Summer In The City, Martin Asbæk Gallery, Denmark
- 2012 Skabt af tiden, The National Museum, Denmark (catalogue)
- 2012 SÅDAN SET – romantik i dansk nutidskunst, Rønnebæksholm, Denmark (catalogue)
- 2011 Myter Om Den Nære Fremtid, Fotografisk Center, Denmark (catalogue)
- 2011 Scandinavian Forest, Melk Gallery, Akershus Artcenter Lillestrøm, Norway
- 2010 Vrå-udstillingen, guest, Denmark
- 2010 Grønningen, Copenhagen, Denmark
- 2010 KUP, Hans Alf Gallery, Copenhagen, Denmark
- 2010 I Love You, ARoS Aarhus Museum of Art, Aarhus, Denmark (catalogue)
- 2010 Jagten – på noget andet, Johannes Larsen Museet, Kerteminde, Denmark (catalogue)
- 2009 Summer in the City, Martin Asbæk Gallery, Denmark
- 2008 Musée Historique et des Porcelaines, Ville de Nyon, France (catalogue)
- 2008 Grønningen, Bornholm Art Museum, Denmark (catalogue)
- 2008 Parallel Landscapes, Gallery Myymälä2, Helsinki, Finland
- 2008 Springtime, Henningsen Contemporary, Copenhagen, Denmark
- 2008 Hunting Grounds, Max Estrella Gallery, Madrid, Spain
- 2008 On hunting, Gallery Andreas Grimm, Münich, Germany
- 2008 Danskjävlar, Kunsthal Charlottenborg, Copenhagen, Denmark (catalogue)
- 2007 Lys over Lolland, Denmark (catalogue)
- 2007 Lianzhou International Photo Festival, Lianzhou, China
- 2007 Existencias, Musac Museo de Arte Contemporaneo de Castilla y Leon, Spain (catalogue)
- 2007 Mia Sundberg Galleri, Stockholm, Sweden
- 2007 Salon 1, Museumsbygningen, Denmark
- 2007 The Animal Show, Galleri Hornbæk, Denmark
- 2007 New Journal, Møstings Hus, Frederiksberg, Denmark
- 2007 One Shot Each, Museum of Photographic Art, Odense, Denmark (catalogue)
- 2007 Acquisitions 1999–2006, Fondation Neuflize, Maison Européenne de la Photographie. Ville de Paris, Paris, France
- 2007 Hunter & Gatherer, Gallery Ferenbalm-Gurbrü Station, Karlsruhe, Germany
- 2007 New Photography From Denmark, Houston, USA (catalogue)
- 2006 Summer in The City II, Martin Asbæk Projects, Copenhagen, Denmark
- 2006 Artist Choice, Bendixen Contemporary, Copenhagen, Denmark
- 2006 Another Adventure, Style Cube Zandari, Seoul, Korea (catalogue)
- 2006 New Adventures, Danish Contemporary Photography & Video, China (catalogue)
- 2006 New Adventures, Danish Contemporary Photography & Video, Korea (catalogue)
- 2006 Summer in The City, Martin Asbæk Projects, Copenhagen, Denmark
- 2003 Familiebilleder, Kunsthallen Brænderigaarden, Viborg, Denmark (catalogue)
- 2000 Longterm Projects, Underground, Galleri Asbæk, Copenhagen, Denmark

== Collections ==
- ARoS, Aarhus Art Museum, Denmark
- Art Foundation Mallorca, Spain
- Art Pradier Collection, Schweiz
- Bornholms Art Museum, Denmark
- BRANDTS, Denmark
- Cornell Fine Arts Museum, USA
- Fanø Art Museum, Denmark
- Fondation Neuflize Vie, Paris, France
- Fondazione Cassa di Risparmio di Modena, Italy
- Gothenburg Museum of Art, Gothenburg, Sweden
- Greve Museum, Denmark
- Hasselblad Foundation, Sweden
- Henry Art Gallery, USA
- Kastrupgaardsamlingen, Denmark
- Kiyosato Museum of Photographic Arts, Japan
- Kunsten – Museum of Modern Art Aalborg, Denmark
- Kunstmuseet i Tønder, Denmark
- La Casa Encendida, Madrid, Spain
- Le Delta – Province de Namur, Belgium
- Maison Européenne de la Photographie, France
- Montreal Museum of Fine Art, Canada
- MUSAC, Leon, Spain
- Musée d’Art Moderne André Malraux, France
- Museum Kunst der Westküste, Germany
- Museum of Fine Arts, Houston, USA
- Museum on the Seam, Jerusalem, Israel
- National Museum of Women in the Arts, United Kingdom
- Skagen Art Museum, Denmark
- Skive Museum, Denmark
- Statoil Art Collection, Norway
- The Block Museum of Art at Northwestern University
- The Danish Arts Foundation, Denmark
- The Danish Parliament’s Art Collection, Denmark
- The Hermes Collection, France
- The Israel Museum, Jerusalem
- The J.Paul Getty Museum, USA
- The Lewis Glucksman Gallery, Ireland
- The National Museum of Art, Norway
- The National Collection of Photography, Denmark
- The New Carlsberg Foundation, Denmark
- The Sir Mark Fehrs Haukohl Photography Collection at LACMA and Brooklyn Museum, USA

== Awards and grants ==
- The Eckersberg Medal 2025, Denmark
- Ole Haslunds Kunstnerlegat (honorary grant), Denmark
- Ny Carlsbergs Kunstner Legat (honorary grant), Denmark
- Poeten Poul Sørensens Legat (honorary grant), Denmark
- The Most Beautiful German Book Prize 2014, Germany
- Aage and Yelva Nimbs Fond, 2012 (honorary grant), Denmark
- Anne Marie Telmanyi, født Carl-Nielsens Fond, 2012 (honorary grant), Denmark
- The Academy Council, 2010 (honorary grant), Denmark
- Nomination for the Deutsche Börse Photography Prize 2006, 2011, United Kingdom
- Three-year working grant, the Danish Arts Foundation, 2009-2011, Denmark
- Fogtdals Rejselegat 2009, Denmark
- Special Jury Prize 2006, Paris Photo 2006, France
- Niels Wessel Bagge Arts Foundation, 1998, Denmark
- The Albert Renger-Patzsch Prize, 2000, Germany
- Joop Swart World Press Master Class, 2000, Netherlands
- Award for a young artist, Museum of Contemporary Art, Roskilde, 1998, Denmark
- The New Carlsberg Foundation, Denmark
- The Danish Arts Agency, Denmark
- The Danish Arts Foundation, Denmark
- Ragnvald og Ida Blix Fond, Denmark
- Københavns Kommunes Billedkunstråd, Denmark
- Nordea Danmark Fonden, Denmark
- The National Workshop for Arts and Crafts, Denmark
- The Danish Ministry of Culture Development Fund, Denmark
