= Thilo Heinzmann =

German painter (born 1969)

Thilo Heinzmann (born 1969) is a German painter. After a guest professorship of painting at the Hochschule für bildende Künste Hamburg in Hamburg, he was appointed professor of painting at Universität der Künste in Berlin.

== Life ==
From 1992 to 1997, Heinzmann studied at the Städelschule in Frankfurt am Main, Germany, under Thomas Bayrle. Between 1993 and 1995 he was an assistant in Martin Kippenberger's studio in Sankt Georgen im Schwarzwald. Between 1997 and 2000 he was a co-founder of various independent exhibition spaces in Berlin, such as Andersen's Wohnung, Montparnasse, Wandel and Pazifik.

His work is held by Tate Modern in London, and in the Bundeskunstsammlung. The Icelandic composer Jóhann Jóhannsson wrote a string quartet based on "12 Conversations with Thilo Heinzmann", which was held over four years.
