= Nicolai Howalt =

Nicolai Howalt (born 1970) is a Danish visual artist and contemporary photographer.

== Biography ==
Nicolai Howalt was born in Copenhagen and graduated from Denmark's Photographic Art School Fatamorgana in 1992. Howalt's work has documentary references, operating at the intersection of conceptual photography and installation.

Howalt has had solo exhibitions at Esbjerg Kunstmuseum; Bruce Silverstein Gallery, New York; Martin Asbæk Gallery, Copenhagen and Center for Fotografi, Stockholm among others. He has also exhibited at Statens Museum for Kunst, ARoS and Skagens Museum in Denmark, and in Korea, China, US, Germany, Lithuania, Poland, France, Finland, England, Hungary and Turkey.

In 2001, Howalt published the book 3x1 with Gyldendal Publishers. Boxer was published in 2003 by ArtPeople. He has received a series of grants from the Hasselblad Foundation, The Danish Ministry of Culture, The Danish Arts Foundation and The Danish Arts Council.

Howalt has a long-term collaboration with the Danish artist Trine Søndergaard. They have published books including How to Hunt, with ArtPeople in 2005 and Hatje Cantz in 2010, and TreeZone with Hassla Books in 2009, and exhibited together in Sweden, Germany, Spain, France, Canada, Finland, US, China and Korea. Their collaborative works have received awards including the Special Jury Prize at Paris Photo 2006 and The Niels Wessel Bagge's Foundation for the Arts Award in 2008.

Howalt is a member of Kunstnersamfundet and The Danish Association of Visual Artists.

== Solo exhibitions ==
- 2011 SAMMENSTØD Esbjerg Kunstmuseum, Danmark.
- 2010 Aros; Århus Kunstmuseum, Denmark
- 2009 Car Crash Studies; Martin Asbæk Gallery, Copenhagen, Denmark
- 2009 Car Crash Studies; Bruce Silverstein Gallery, New York, NY
- 2008 Musée Historique et des Porcelaines; with Søndergaard, Ville de Nyon, France
- 2007 Hunting Scenes; with Søndergaard, Lys over Lolland, Denmark (cat)
- 2007 The Parisian Laundry; with Søndergaard, Mois de la Photo, Montréal, Canada (cat)
- 2007 Fotografiets Hus; with Søndergaard, Stockholm, Sweden
- 2007 How to Hunt; with Søndergaard, Bruce Silverstein Gallery, New York City
- 2007 How to Hunt; with Søndergaard, Martin Asbæk Projects, Denmark
- 2006 Galerie Poller NY, New York City
- 2006 ParisPhoto2006; with Søndergaard, Martin Asbæk Projects, Paris, France (cat)
- 2006 Faaborg Art Museum; with Søndergaard, Faaborg, Denmark (cat)
- 2006 Galerie Poller; with Søndergaard, Frankfurt, Germany
- 2005 Martin Asbæk Project; with Søndergaard, Marts, Denmark
- 2005 Nordic House, Cracow, Polen
- 2004 Kaunas Photo, Kaunas, Lituania
- 2004 Center for Contemporary Art – Århus, Denmark
- 2004 Gallerie Schüster, Frankfurt, Germany
- 2004 Vensyssel Art Museum, Denmark
- 2003 Galerie Asbæk, Copenhagen, Denmark
- 2001 Galerie Asbæk, Copenhagen, Denmark
- 2001 Center for Photography, Stockholm, Sweden
- 1997 Museet for Fotokunst, Odense, Denmark

== Solo exhibitions: Trine Søndergaard & Nicolai Howalt ==
- 2013 Nicolai Howalt & Trine Søndergaard, Bruce Silverstein Gallery, New York City
- 2011 How to Hunt, Maison du Danemark, Paris
- 2010 How to Hunt, ARoS, Aarhus Kunstmuseum, Arhus, Denmark
- 2009 Tree Zone, Volta, New York City
- 2007 How to Hunt, Fotografins Hus, Stockholm, Sweden
- 2007 Hunting Grounds, The Parisian Laundry, Mois de la Photo, Montreal, Canada (catalogue)
- 2007 How to Hunt, Bruce Silverstein Gallery, New York City
- 2006 Statement, ParisPhoto, Paris, France (catalogue)
- 2006 How to Hunt, Gallery Poller, Frankfurt, Germany
- 2006 How to Hunt, Faaborg Museum of Fine Art, Faaborg, Denmark (catalogue)
- 2005 How to Hunt, Martin Asbæk Projects, Copenhagen, Denmark

== Group exhibitions ==
- 2010 A PEDIBUS USQUE AD CAPUT (Fra fødder til hoved), Rigshospitalet, Copenhagen, Denmark
- 2010 Denmark in Transition, Museet for Fotokunst, Odense, Denmark
- 2008 Collisions; Maison du Danemark, Paris, France
- 2008 Spring Time; Groupshow at Henningsen Contemporary Copenhagen
- 2008 Unreal; with Trine Søndergaard, Astrid Kruse, Jonna Karanka, Susanna Majuri. Helsinki, Finland
- 2008 Another Adventures; with Søndergaard. Frankfurt, Germany (cat)
- 2008 Hunting Grounds; with Trine Søndergaard, Ebbe Stub Wittrub. Max Estrella Gallery, Madrid, Spain
- 2008 Grønningen; with Søndergaard, Bornholms Art Museum, Denmark
- 2008 On Hunting; with Søndergaard, Gallery Andreas Grimm, Münich, Germany.
- 2008 Art Basel; Solo-projects, (artfair)
- 2008 Danish Devils; with Søndergaard, Kunsthal Charlottenborg, Copenhagen, Denmark. (cat)
- 2008 ARCO 08" (artfair) Madrid, Spain
- 2008 Berlin Art Forum; (artfair) Berlin, Germany
- 2007 Reality Crossing; 2.Fotofestival Kunsthalle Mannheim, Denmark (cat)
- 2007 New Photography from Denmark, Houston, US.
- 2007 Lianzhou Fotobienale; with Søndergaard, Ebbe Stub & Astrid K. Jensen (cat)
- 2007 Salon 1" Museumsbygningen, Copenhagen, Denmark
- 2007 Mia Sundberg Gallery; with Søndergaard, Stockholm, Sweden
- 2007 Existencias; with Søndergaard, MUSAC – Museo de Arte Contemporáneo de Castilla y Leon, Spain
- 2007 Summer in the City II; with Søndergaard, Martin Asbæk Projects, Denmark
- 2007 New Journal; with Søndergaard, Møstingshus, Denmark
- 2007 Fondation Neuflize Vie: Acquisitions for the MEP (1999–2006); with Trine Søndergaard, Maison Europeenne de la Photographie Ville de Paris, France
- 2007 Achtung! Kunst!; The National Museum of Photography, Denmark
- 2007 Hunter & Gatherer; with Søndergaard, Gallery Ferenbalm-Gurbrü Station, Germany
- 2007 The Animal Show; with Søndergaard, Galleri Hornbæk, Denmark
- 2006 Scandinavian Photo II: Denmark; FotoFest, Texas, US. (cat)
- 2006 Teen Beat; the Society for Contemporary Photography, Kansas, US
- 2006 Summer in the City; with Søndergaard. Martin Asbaek Projects, Denmark
- 2006 Another Adventures; with Søndergaard. Style Cube Zandari, Seoul, Korea. (cat)
- 2006 The Open Book; The National Museum, Copenhagen, Denmark (cat)
- 2006 Artists´ Choice; with Søndergaard, Bendixen Contemporary Art, Denmark
- 2005 Spells of Childhood; Tampere Art Museum, Finland (cat)
- 2005 New Photography from Denmark; Faulconer Gallery, Iowa, US.
- 2005 Contemporary Photo Books; Rocket Gallery, London, UK
- 2004 Martin Asbæk Projects, Galerie Asbæk, Denmark
- 2004 Distance; Institute of Contemporary Art, Dunaujvaros, Hungary
- 2004 Hereford Photography Festival; Hereford, UK. (cat)
- 2004 Don't mention it; The National Museum, Denmark
- 2004 Something different; Fotografisk Center, Denmark
- 2004 Familliebilleder; Brænderigaarden, Viborg, Denmark (cat)
- 2003 Surprise; Galerie Asbæk, København, Denmark
- 2003 Boxer; Museet for Fotokunst, Denmark (cat)
- 2003 3*1; Ifsak, November, Istanbul, Turkey
- 2002 Home Sweet Home; Århus Art Museum, Denmark (cat)
- 2002 Surprise; Galerie Asbæk, Copenhagen, Denmark
- 2001 Never Ending Story; Billboard, Marts, Copenhagen, Denmark
- 2000 Longterm Projects; with Søndergaard, Galerie Asbæk, Copenhagen, Denmark
- 1999 Fatamorgana; Øksnehallen, Copenhagen, Denmark (cat)
- 1999 2. Maj's Jubilæum's Udstilling; Rejsestaldene, Copenhagen, Denmark (cat)
- 1999 From the Hidden; The National Museum of Photo, Denmark
- 1999 Ung Fotografi; Birkerød Kunstforening, Birkerød, Denmark
- 1998 Meanwhile; Fotografisk Center, Copenhagen, Denmark. (cat)
- 1998 1000 year 10; Museum for Modern Art, Roskilde, Denmark
- 1995 Efterårsudstillingen; October, Charlottenborg, Copenhagen, Denmark (cat)
- 1992 Gruppe; Fotografisk Galleri, Copenhagen, Denmark

== Group exhibitions: Trine Søndergaard & Nicolai Howalt ==
- 2010 Grønningen, Copenhagen, Denmark
- 2010 KUP, Hans Alf Gallery, Copenhagen, Denmark
- 2010 I Love You, ARoS Aarhus Museum of Art, Aarhus, Denmark (catalogue)
- 2010 Jagten – på noget andet, Johannes Larsen Museet, Kerteminde, Denmark (catalogue)
- 2009 Summer in the City, Martin Asbæk Gallery, Denmark
- 2008 Musée Historique et des Porcelaines, Ville de Nyon, France (catalogue)
- 2008 Grønningen, Bornholm Art Museum, Denmark (catalogue)
- 2008 Parallel Landscapes, Gallery Myymälä2, Helsinki, Finland
- 2008 Springtime, Henningsen Contemporary, Copenhagen, Denmark
- 2008 Hunting Grounds, Max Estrella Gallery, Madrid, Spain
- 2008 On hunting, Gallery Andreas Grimm, Münich, Germany
- 2008 Danskjävlar, Kunsthal Charlottenborg, Copenhagen, Denmark (catalogue)
- 2007 Lys over Lolland, Denmark (catalogue)
- 2007 Lianzhou International Photo Festival, Lianzhou, China
- 2007 Existencias, Musac Museo de Arte Contemporaneo de Castilla y Leon, Spain (catalogue)
- 2007 Mia Sundberg Galleri, Stockholm, Sweden
- 2007 Salon 1, Museumsbygningen, Denmark
- 2007 The Animal Show, Galleri Hornbæk, Denmark
- 2007 New Journal, Møstings Hus, Frederiksberg, Denmark
- 2007 One Shot Each, Museum of Photographic Art, Odense, Denmark (catalogue)
- 2007 Acquisitions 1999–2006, Fondation Neuflize, Maison Européenne de la Photographie. Ville de Paris, Paris, France
- 2007 Hunter & Gatherer, Gallery Ferenbalm-Gurbrü Station, Karlsruhe, Germany
- 2007 New Photography From Denmark, Houston, USA (catalogue)
- 2006 Summer in The City II, Martin Asbæk Projects, Copenhagen, Denmark
- 2006 Artist Choice, Bendixen Contemporary, Copenhagen, Denmark
- 2006 Another Adventure, Style Cube Zandari, Seoul, Korea (catalogue)
- 2006 New Adventures, Danish Contemporary Photography & Video, China (catalogue)
- 2006 New Adventures, Danish Contemporary Photography & Video, Korea (catalogue)
- 2006 Summer in The City, Martin Asbæk Projects, Copenhagen, Denmark
- 2003 Familiebilleder, Kunsthallen Brænderigaarden, Viborg, Denmark (catalogue)
- 2000 Longterm Projects, Underground, Galleri Asbæk, Copenhagen, Denmark

== Collections ==
- Art Foundation Mallorca, Spain.
- Hiscox Art Project, US.
- Bornholms Kunstmuseum, Gudhjem, Denmark.
- The Israel Museum, Jerusalem, Israel.
- Skagens Museum, Skagen, Denmark.
- Ny Carlsberg Fondet, Copenhagen, Denmark.
- La Casa Encendida, Madrid, Spain.
- La Casa Encendida, Madrid, Spain.
- The Danish Arts Foundation, Copenhagen, Denmark.
- The National Museum of Photography, Copenhagen, Denmark.
- The Museum of Art Photography, Odense, Denmark.
- Musac, Museo de Arte Contemporáneo de Castilla y León. Spain.
- Nykredit, Copenhagen, Denmark.
- The K.P.A. Kunst på arbejdspladsen, Copenhagen, Denmark.
- The Hermés Collection. France.
- the Juan Redón Collection, Espania.

== Publications ==
- Nicolai Howalt & Trine Søndergaard. TreeZone. Hassla Books, 2009.
- Nicolai Howalt & Trine Søndergaard, with text by Anna Krogh. How to Hunt. Artpeople, Copenhagen, 2005.
- Nicolai Howalt. Boxer. People's Press, 2003.
- Nicolai Howalt. 3X1. Kobenhavn, Gyldendal, 2001.
