= Søren Robert Lund =

Danish architect (born 1962)

Søren Robert Lund (born 19 June 1962) is a Danish architect with his studio located in Copenhagen, Denmark. Lund studied architecture at the Royal Danish Academy of Fine Arts in Copenhagen from 1982–1989. In 1988, while a student, he won the national competition for the Arken Museum of Modern Art in Ishøj, Denmark. He was awarded the first prize and the commission. In February 1991 he established his own studio, Søren Robert Lund, Architects.
