= John Korner =

Danish artist (born 1967)

John Kørner (born in 1967) is a Danish artist based in Copenhagen.

Kørner was born in Aarhus, Denmark. He attended the Royal Danish Academy of Fine Arts in Copenhagen between 1992 and 1998. His paintings feature a mixture of figurative and abstract imagery rendered in watered-down acrylic. Some common motifs are people, animals, boats and trees. In addition to works on canvas, Korner also paints on ceramics. He was awarded an Eckersberg Medal in 2012.

== Selected exhibitions ==
- Painting as Presence, Künstlerhaus Bethanien, Berlin & Taidehalli, Helsinki (2006)
- Statements, Art Basel (2005)
- Saatchi Gallery, London (2005)
- Momentum 04, Moss 2004, Norway (2004)
- Painting 2004, Gallery Victoria Miro, London (2004)
- Superdanish, Toronto, Canada (2004)
- The design of Productions, Gallery Maze, Torino, Italy (2004)
- Galleri Stefan Andersson, Umeå, Sweden (2003)
- The Greenland Problem, Herning Artmuseum, Denmark (2003)
- Be On Show, Galleri Christina Wilson, Copenhagen (2002)
- POST, Galleri Franz Pedersen Horsens, Denmark (2002)
- Theater, Arhus Artmuseum – Project-room-installation (2001)
- Dig Og John’s Engagement, Galleri Søren Houmann, Copenhagen (2000)
