= Danish Arts Foundation =

Coordinates: 55.6781°N 12.5647°E

The Danish Arts Foundation (Danish: Statens Kunstfond) is the principal Danish government funded arts foundation founded by a special Law on 27 May 1964.

Statens Kunstfond alongside the Statens Kunstråd (English sometimes State Arts Council now Danish Agency for Culture) allocates funds provided by the Ministry of Culture (da:Kulturministeriet). It is overseen and administered by the da:Kulturstyrelsen (Danish Cultural Authority) which is an administrative unit of the Ministry of Culture. Danish literature is supported both by the Statens Kunstfond and a larger amount directly by the Ministry of Culture.

In 2014 the Danish Arts Council and the Danish Arts Foundation merged to form one new body, to be known as the Danish Arts Foundation.
