= Karel van Mander House =

Building in Copenhagen, Denmark

- Karel van Mander House
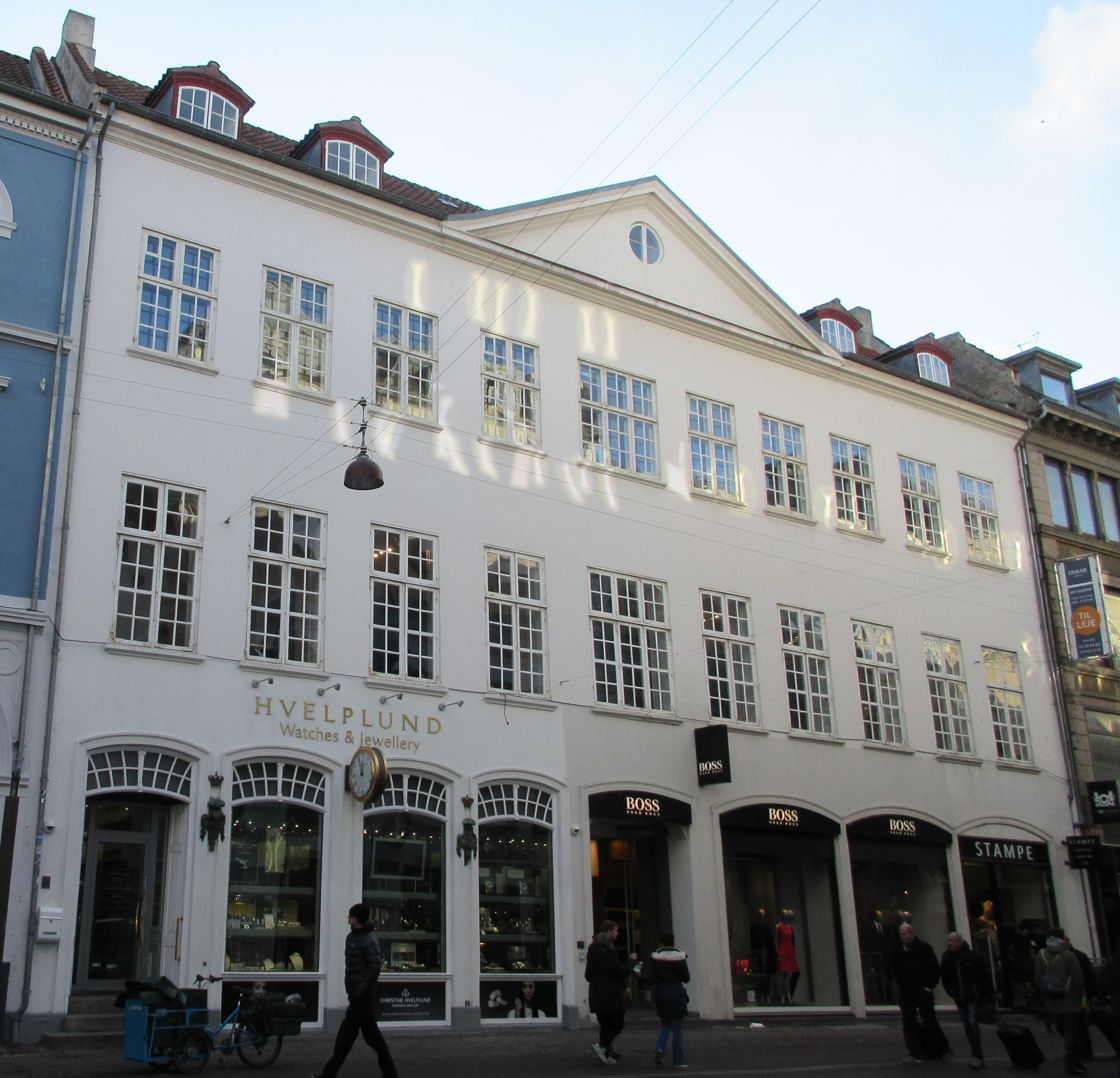
- Interactive map of the Karel van Mander House area

General information
- Architectural style: Neoclassical
- Location: Copenhagen, Denmark
- Coordinates: 55°40′46.49″N 12°34′0.88″E

The Karel van Mander House /Danish: Karel van Manders Gård) is a historic building located at the central shopping street Strøget (Østergade) in Copenhagen, Denmark. It takes its name after the artist Karel van Mander III (1609-1670) who was a resident for a few years. It later played host to the gentlemen's club Kongens Klub from 1776 to circa 1850.A Hugo Boss flagship store now occupies the ground floor.

== History ==
=== Early history ===
The house, then a two-storey building, was built in the middle of the 17th century. The artist Karel van Mander III lived in it for a few years after his return to Copenhagen from Italy in the late 17th century.

The property was listed in Copenhagen's first cadastre of 1689 as No. 9 in the city's East Quarter. It was owned by Conrad Biermann von Ehrenschild at that time. It was listed in the new cadastre of 1756 as No. 12 and was owned by Johan Simon Nagant at that time. Conrad Wilhelm Ahlefeldt, Copenhagen's governor, purchased the building in 1757. He renovated the interiors.

=== 1776–1859: The Royal Club ===
Gottlieb Schreck purchased the building in 1775. He adapted the building for use by Fich's Club (Fichs Klub), a gentlemen's club for members of the bourgeoisie founded in 1776. It had 25 members at the time of its creation but the number of members had grown to approximately 80 in 1778. The activities included concerts. It was renamed The Royal Club (Kongens Klub) by royal resolution of 16 November 1782. The name was associated with the building even after the club moved out in about 1850.

In 1784, Schreck sold the property to his son-in-law A. Friisenberg. He worked as a "collector" (lottery ticket seller) for Tal-Lotteriet. His property was home to 20 residents in two households at the time of the 17887 census. Anders Friisenberg resided in the building with the widow Luice Lindholm, one male servant and one maid. Erenst Møller, listed in the census records as the "operator of a billiard parlor" (billiardholder), resided in the building with his wife Maria Hasel, their four children (aged one to 11), a caretaker, two Maqueurs and six servants.

In 1794, Friisenberg sold the property to ironmonger Peter Gabriel Klein His property was home to 33 residents in five households at the time of the 1801 census. Peter Gabriel Klein resided in the building with his wife Anna Catrine (née Rømer) five children (aged three to 11), two ironmongers (employees) and three maids. Niels Clemensen, a ciacgman, resided in the building with his wife Giertrud Nielsen, and two children (aged 12 and 14). Christian Schrøder, who served as club host of the King's Club, resided in the building with his wife Christiane Charlotte (née Bøtker)m their six-year-old daughter and one maid. Jørgen Petersen, a caretaker, resided in the building with three maids (serving the other households). Lars Holm, a pot seller, resided in the building with his wife Inger Andersdatter, a three-year-old son and six lodgers. Jlein's property was listed in the new cadastre of 1806 as No. 14.

=== Feyerschou family, 1811–1906 ===
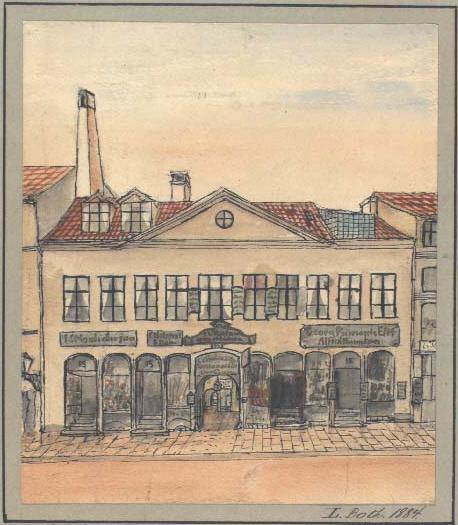
The front of the building in 1884

In 1811, Klein sold the property to stockings merchant Peter Hansen Feyerschou. Hos property was home to 43 residents in eight households at the 1840 census. Johan Christian Benzen Berring, a silk and textile merchant, resided on the ground floor with his wife Caroline Christiane Berring, his half-sister Helene Kirstine Bugge, his half-brother Willads Bugge, two male sercants and one maid. Necoline Katrine Bedste, a club hostress, resided on the ground floor with two lodgers, two male servants and three maids. Christian Jensen Spendrop, a manager, resided on the first floor with his wife Christine Marie Steffensen, their two-year-old son and one maid. Bengt Aackerberg, an innkeeper, resided in the basement with his wife Ane Hansen, their three children (aged one to seven) and two maids. André Verdier, a glovemaker, resided on the second floor of the rear wing with his wife Karen Lund , their three children (aged eight to 19) and one maid. The eldest son was an apprentice in his father's business. Jensen, another innkeeper, resided in the basement of the building facing Lille Kongensgade with her son, one lodger and two maids.

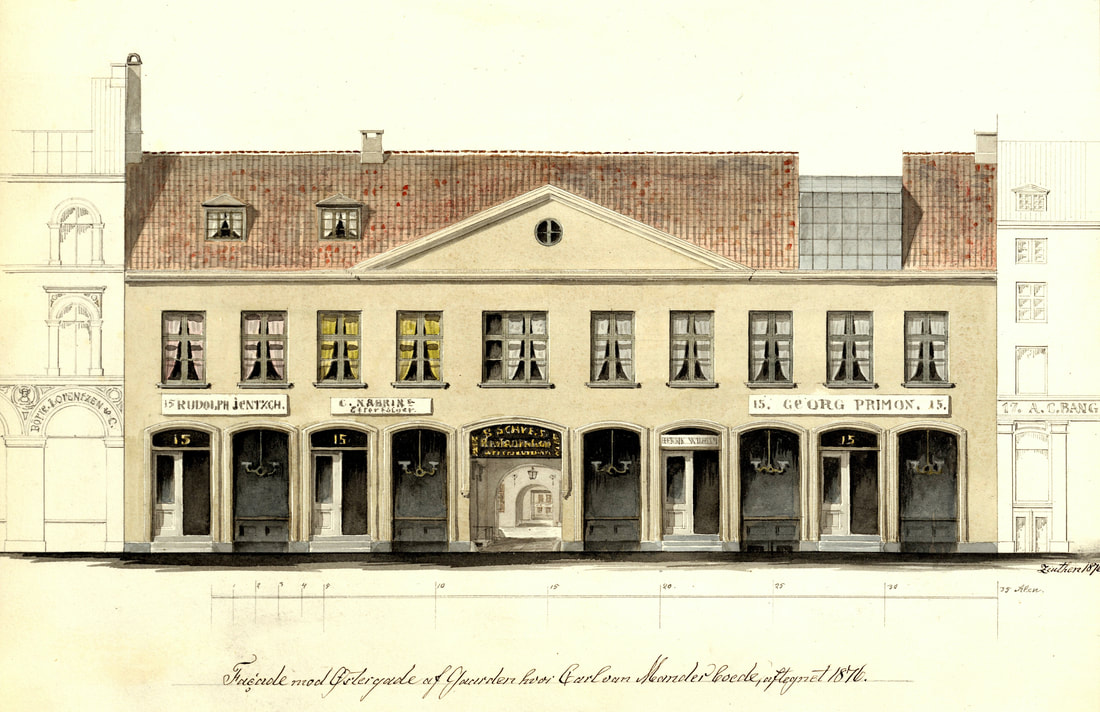
Østergade 15 depicted by Christian O. Zeuthen, 1876.

A number of early Danish photographers worked in the building from the 1860s. The Funen portrait photographer Jens Petersen opened a Photographic studio in the building when he moved his business from Svendborg to Copenhagen in 1863. He was appointed to royal photographer in 1864 and was that same year by Georg Emil Hansen sent to Jutland as war photographer during the Second Schleswig War. In 1864, he moved his studio to the Harsdorff House in Kongens Nytorv.

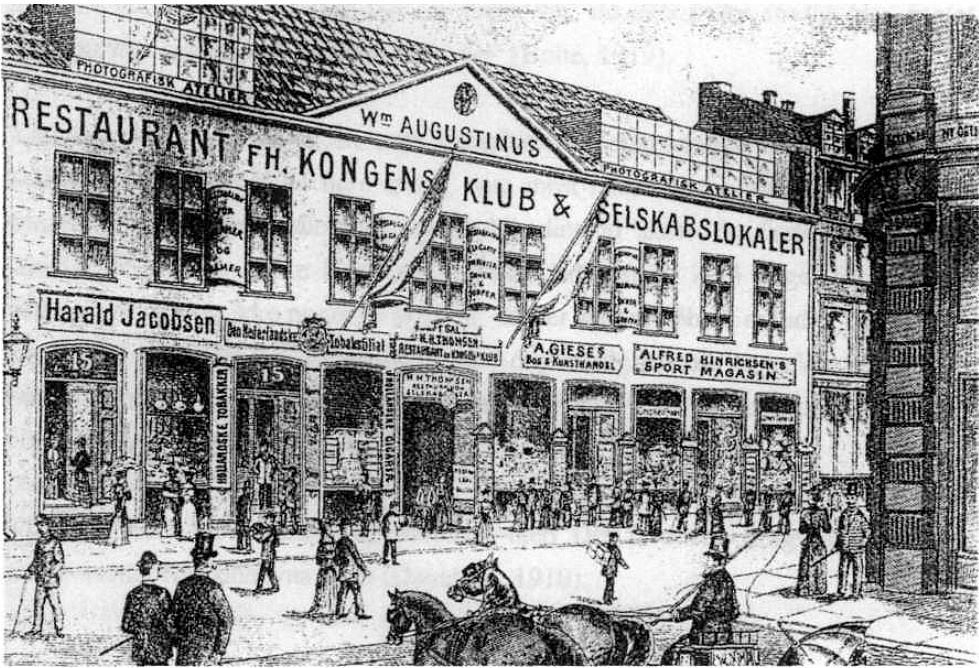
Østergade 15 in 1890

The photography studio Hansen, Schou & Weller was from 1872 based in the building. Georg Emil Hansen and his brother, Niels Christian had founded the company in 1862, Albert Schou had become a partner in 1867 and Clemens Weller in 1869. In 1885, it moved to new premises in the Schimmelmann Mansion in Bredgade.

=== 20th century ===
A. Giese operated a stationery and art shop in the building in the 1900s )-10+9-).

The art dealers Ole Haslund and Svend Heyman acquired the building in 1910. They created an antique store of international reputation in the building.. The antiques were mostly acquired on trips to Spain, Italy, France and Belgium. In 1918–19Haslund and Heyman, assisted by the architect H. P. Jacobsen, expanded the complex with an extra floor. With Heymans 's death in 1932, Haslund became the sole owner of the company. In 1940, he ceded all shares in the company to the Haslund Art Foundation. In 1942, the company moved to new premises at Amagertorv 14.

== Architecture ==
The building on Østergade is ten bays long. The four central bays are tipped by a triangular pediment.

Two three-storey side wings connect the two buildings. Together with an intersecting cross wing, they create two interior courtyards.

== Today ==
The tenants now include a Hugo Boss store.
