= Bredgade 24 =

Building in Copenhagen, Denmark

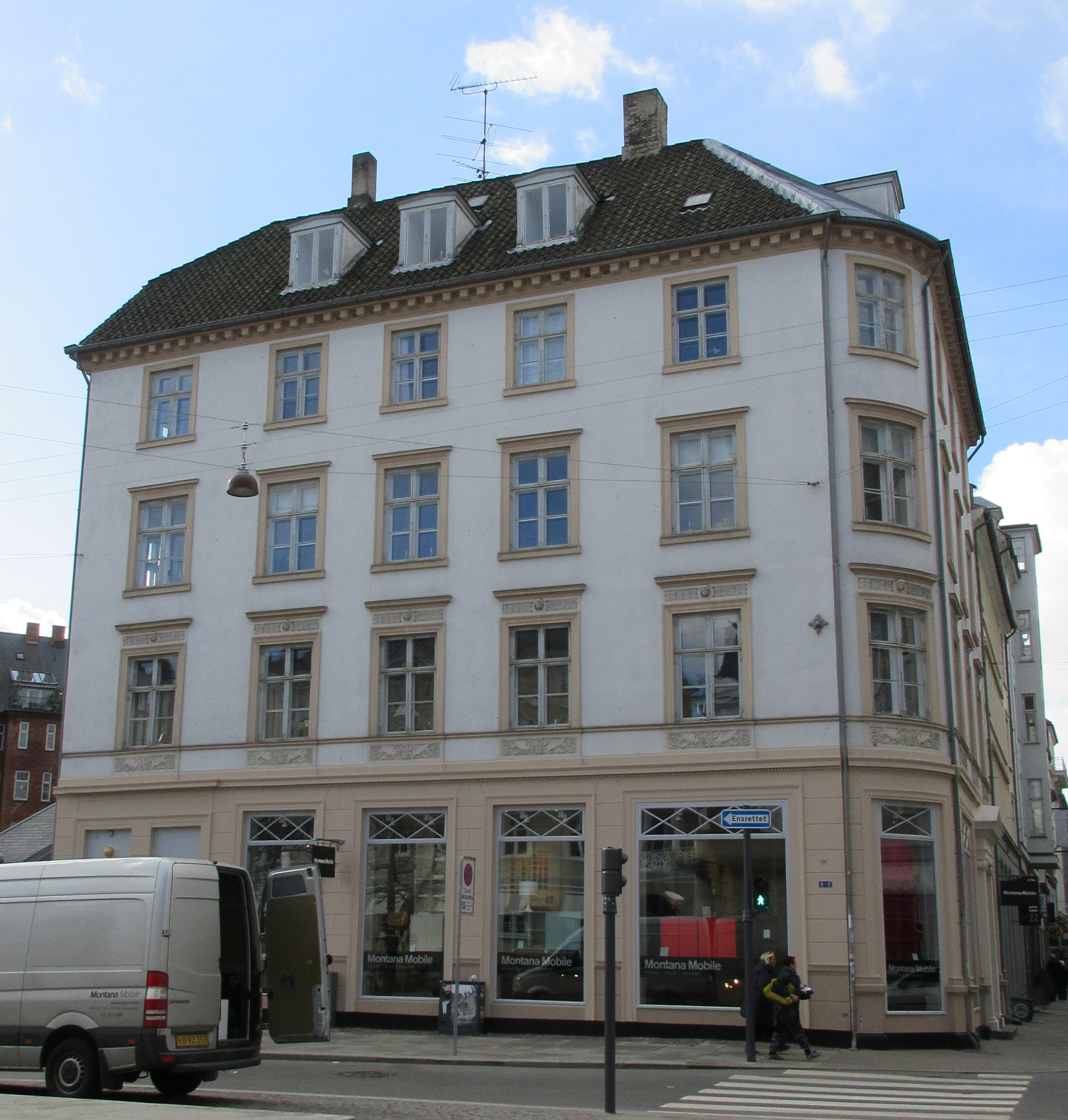
- The house seen from the other side of the canal

General information
- Location: Copenhagen, Denmark
- Coordinates: 55°40′55.42″N 12°35′18.94″E
- Completed: 1855

Design and construction
- Architect: Niels Sigfred Nebelong

Bredgade 24 is a listed building located at the corner of Bredgade and Sankt Annæ Plads (No. 2) in central Copenhagen, Denmark. The building was listed on the Danish registry of protected buildings in 1987. Notable former residents include painter and photographer Niels Christian Hansen.

== History ==
=== 18th century ===
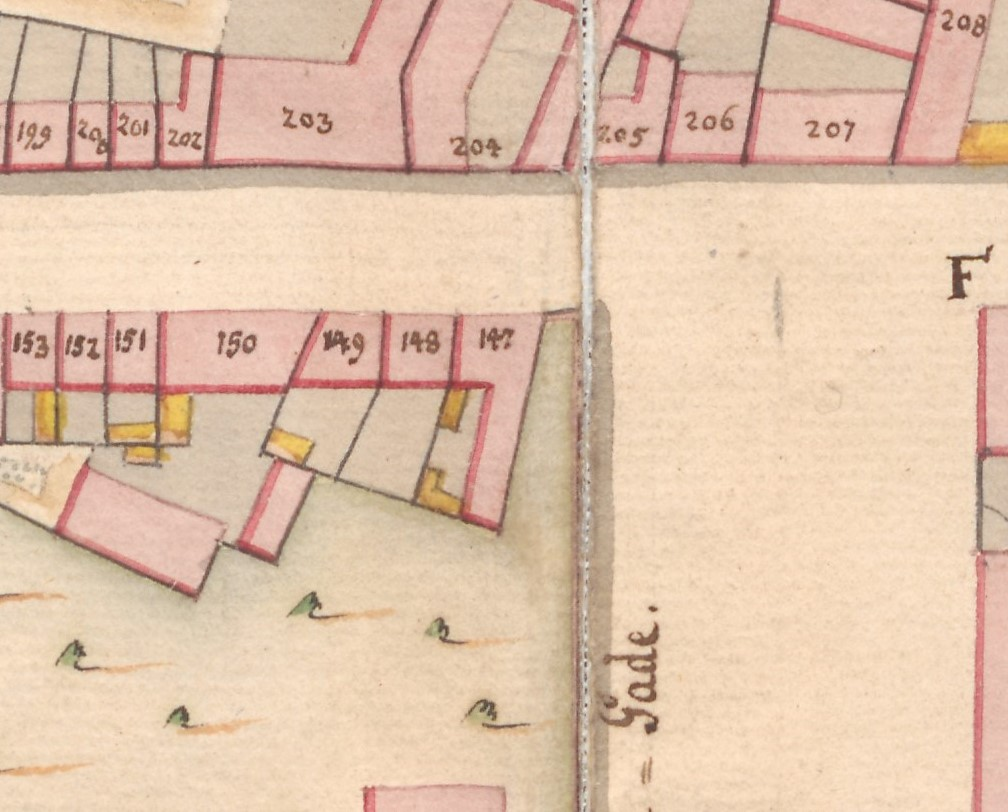
No. 147 seen on a detail from Christian Gedde's map of St. Ann's East Quarter, 1757.

The properties now known as Bredgade 24 and Bredgade 22 were formerly part of the same property.. This property was listed in Copenhagen's first cadastre of 1689 as No. 90 in St. Ann's East Quarter (Sankt Annæ Øster Kvarter), owned by justitsråd Lerche. The property was later divided into two properties. The corner property was listed in the new cadastre of 1756 as No. 147 and belonged to Frederik Wever (Johan Friederich Wewer?) at that time.

No. 147 was home to three households at the 1787 census. Hans Jørgen Twede, then a 30-year-old beer seller (øltapper), resided in the building with his wife Ellen Mortens Datter, a maid and two lodgers (both of them carpenters). Berte Glasens, a widow seamstress, resided in the building with her five children (aged three to 14) and one lodger. Mette Myhre, another widow, resided in the building with a maid.

=== 1800n – 1830s ===
No. 147 was home to a total of 36 residents in ten households at the 1801 census. Elsebeth Kaysen, a 69-year-old widow and the owner of the property, resided in the building with the 19-year-old maid Karen Marie Holm, the 45-year-old widow Marie Christine Schøning (née Nægler), Schøning's 24-year-old daughter and their 24-year-old maid Kirstine Toxværd. The tenants included a broker, a controller, a skipper, two royal lackeys, a beer seller (øltapper) and a workman.

The property was listed as No. 169 in the new cadastre of 1806. It was owned by skipper Hans Tønnesen at that time.

=== J. J. Hansen and the new building ===
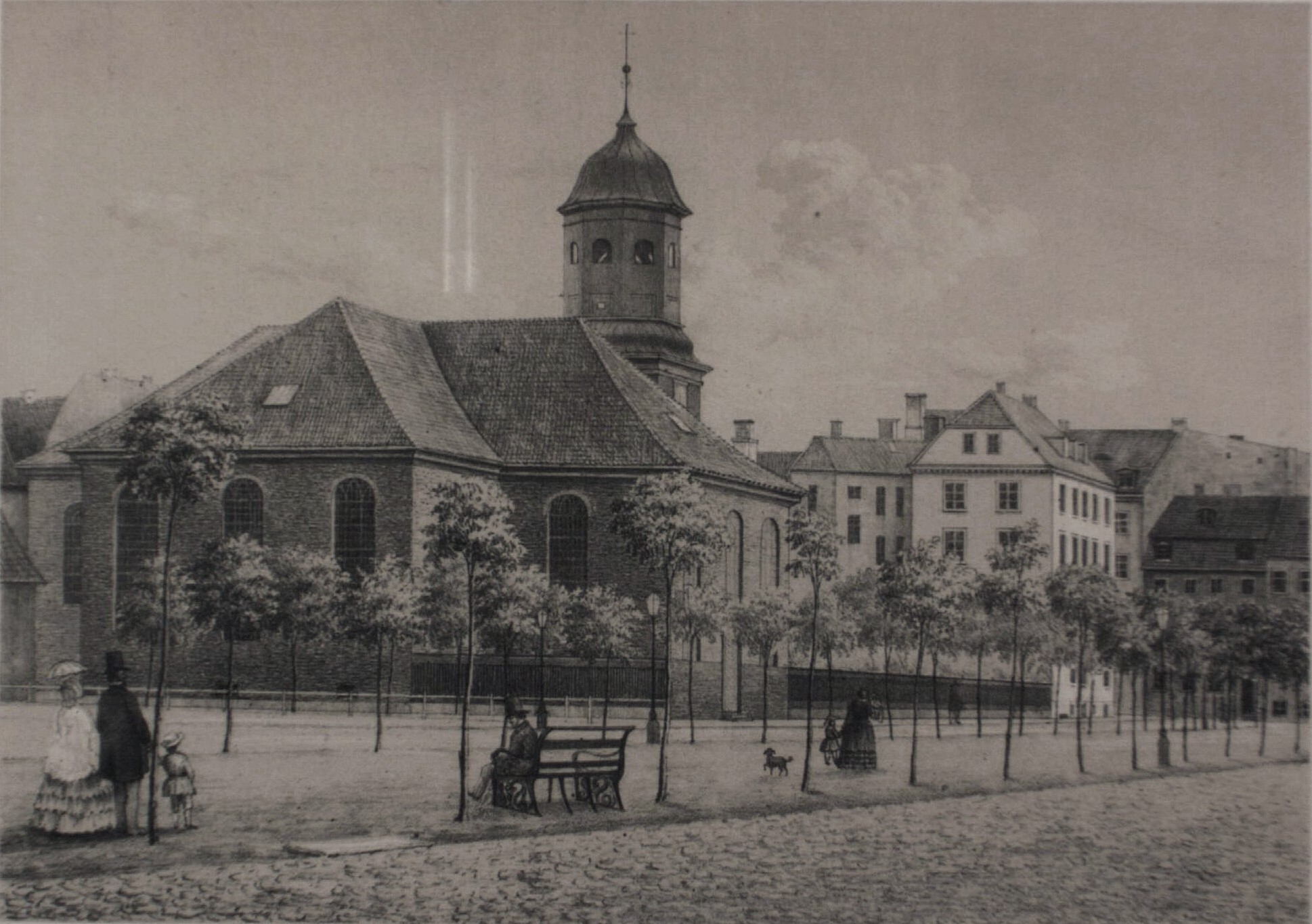
The building seen on a drawing from 1850.

At some point, No. 169 was acquired by ship captain J. J. Hansen. At the time of the 1840 census, Hansen's property was home to 32 residents. The owner J. J. Hansen resided on the second floor with his wife Johane D. Thrane, their 11-year-old daughter Johane Jørgine Hansen, the wife's sister Hansine Thrane and one maid.The sisters Johanne J. Ramshart, Anna E. Ramshart and Christine Ramshart resided on the first floor with one maid as well as the widow Louise Morville (widow of former Defence Minister J. H. Morville), her two children (aged two and 13), one more maid and another widow named Præstogt. Bothilde Fenger and Helena Haberlin, two widows, resided on the third floor with Fenger's daughter Bothilde Fenger, one maid, two unmarried women and two student lodgers. A. F. Eduard, a former naval officer, resided on the ground floor with gravedigger at the Garrison Church S. Jørgensen and medicine student Heinrik Callisen. Jacob Jagern, a baker, resided in the basement with his wife Juliane Klein, their 15-year-old daughter, Line Kjertman (also employed with baking), 11-year-old Sophie Cathrine Lind and two maids.

At the 1845 census, No. 169 was home to seven households. Jørgen Johan Hansen and Johanna Dorothea Hansen resided in the building with their daughter Jørgine Johane Hansen. the wife's sister Henriette Thrane, two maids and Christian V. Fabrisius, a colonel lieutenant, resided in the building with his wife Lolle Fabrisius, their seven-year-old daughter and two maids. Olene C. Schou, a widow, resided in the building with her six children (aged 15 to 28(, her 28-year-old foster daughter Georgine M. Zideler and one maid. Johanna S.Fauerberg, a 64-year-old, unmarried woman, resided in the building on her own. Bethilde Fenger, a widow, resided in the building with her 30-year-old daughter Bothilde E.Fenger, a maid and a lodger. Peter Carl F.Hansen (medicine student), J.Emil Hansen (theology student), Helena Hauman (needlework) and Maria Hauman (needlework) resided together in a sixth apartment. Jacob C.F.Jagern, a rye bread baker and flour retailer, resided in the basement with his wife Juliane M. Jagern, their 18-year-old daughter, a 16-year-old foster daughter, a baker (employee) and a maid.

The present building on the site was constructed for J. J. Hansen in 1855. It was built to a Late Neoclassical design by Niels Sigfred Nebelong.

On 30 August 1860 in Gentofte, Jørgine Johanne Hansen (1830-1913) married to businessman (grosserer) and Portuguese vice consul Vigo Berthel Christian Fogh (1835-1892).

Four Sisters of St. Joseph, who came to Denmark in 1856 to establish a Catholic school, initially stayed in the basement at Sankt Annæ Plads 2.

=== 1885 census ===
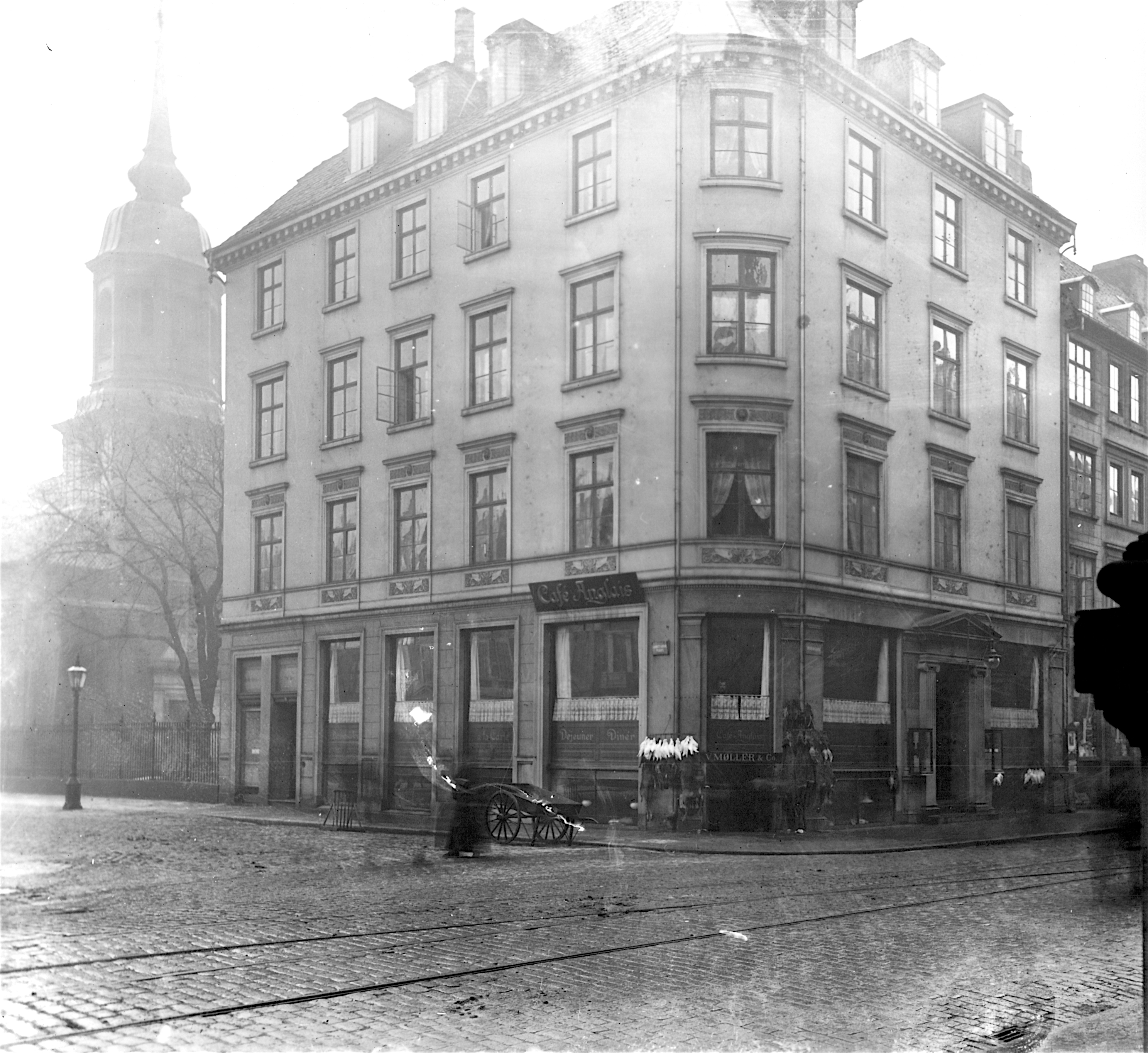
The building photographed by Frederik Riise in c. 1894: Café Anglais is located on the ground floor and Møller's wine ship is located in the basement.

The property was home to 20 residents at the 1885 census. Bodil Christine Ørlandi , widow of a royal plasterer, resided on the ground floor with one male servant, two maids and the lodger Niels Bertrnm Schomose. Edel Michelsen, widow of a consul, resided on the first floor with one maid. R. Holck, a count (lensgreve, born c. 1718(, resided on the second floor with his housekeeper Petrea Caroline Johansen. Niels Christian Hansen, a portrait painter and photographer, resided on the third floor with his divorced mother Henriette Hansen, his sister Cathinka Hansen, one maid and one nurse. Victor Peter Møller, a wine merchant, resided in the basement with two adopted sons (aged 13 and 15), his housekeeper Christiane Augusta Krarup, a floor clerk and a maid.

The art historian Julius Lange resided in one of the apartments overlooking the square 1893 until his death three years later.

=== 20th century ===
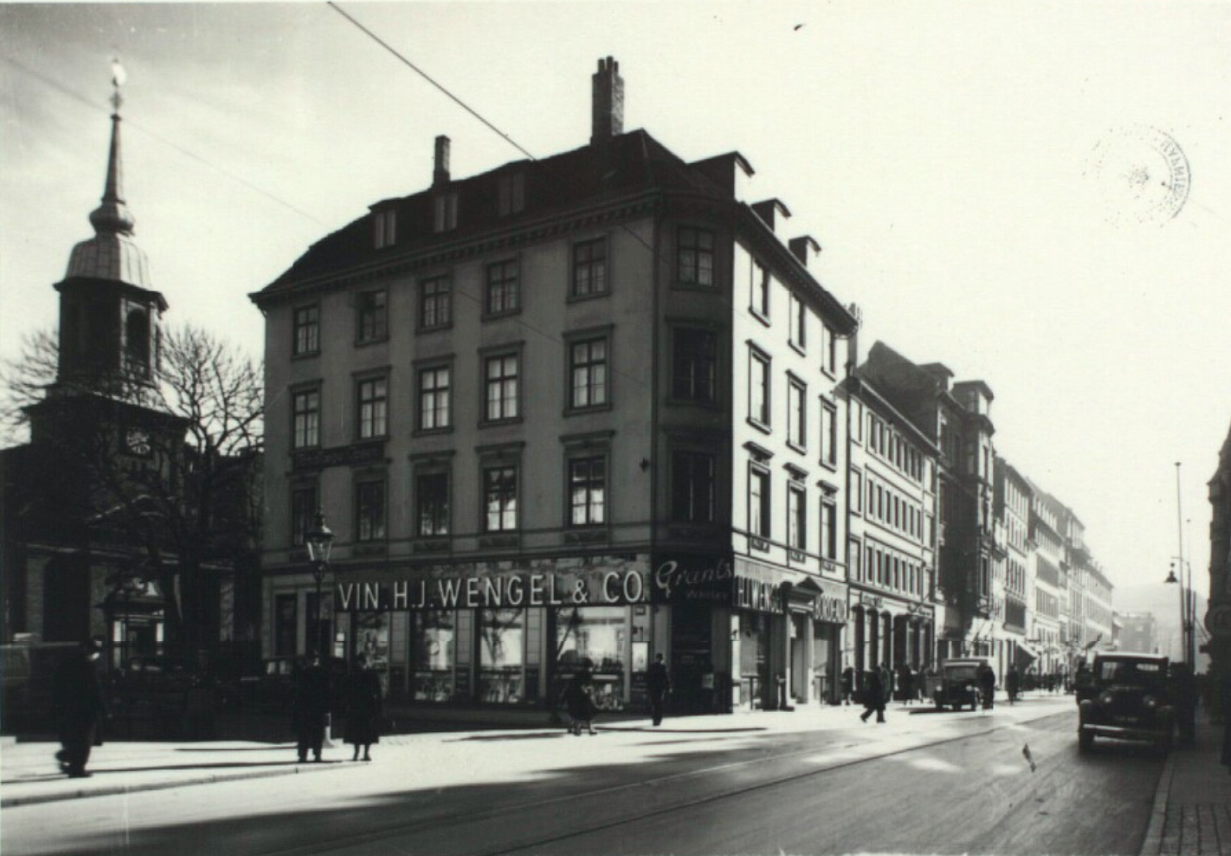
The building with a H. J. Wenger wine store located in the ground floor

H. J. Wengel & Co., a wine shop owned by H. J. Wengel (1873-) and Valdemar Reyn (1869-1935), was from 1900 based on the ground floor. Wengel was in 1950 the sole proprietor of the store. The premises were later taken over by Arnbaks Kunsthandelm, a commercial art gallery.

The building was listed on the Danish Registry of Protected Buildings and Places in 1987.

== Architecture ==
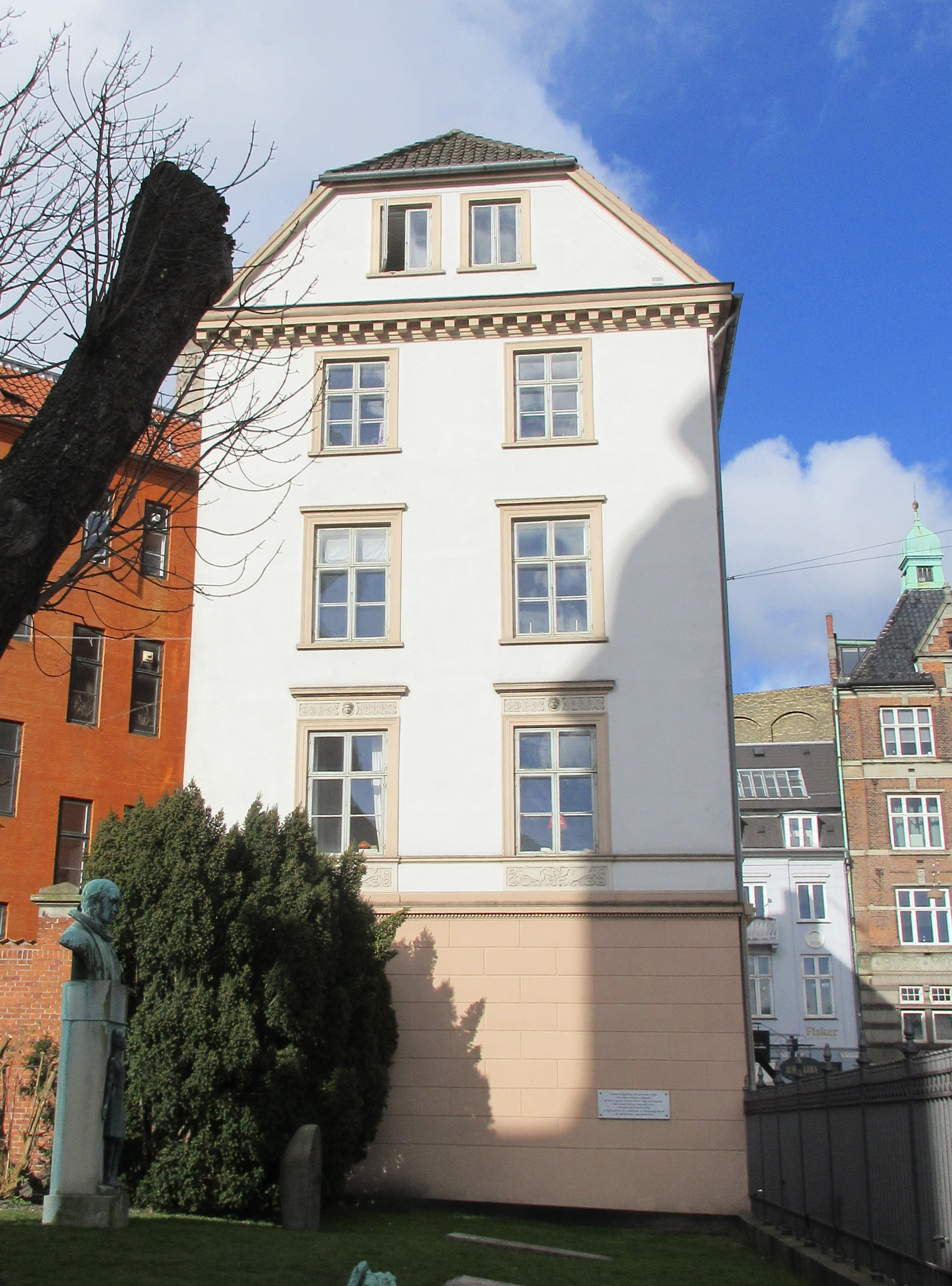
The building seen from the church

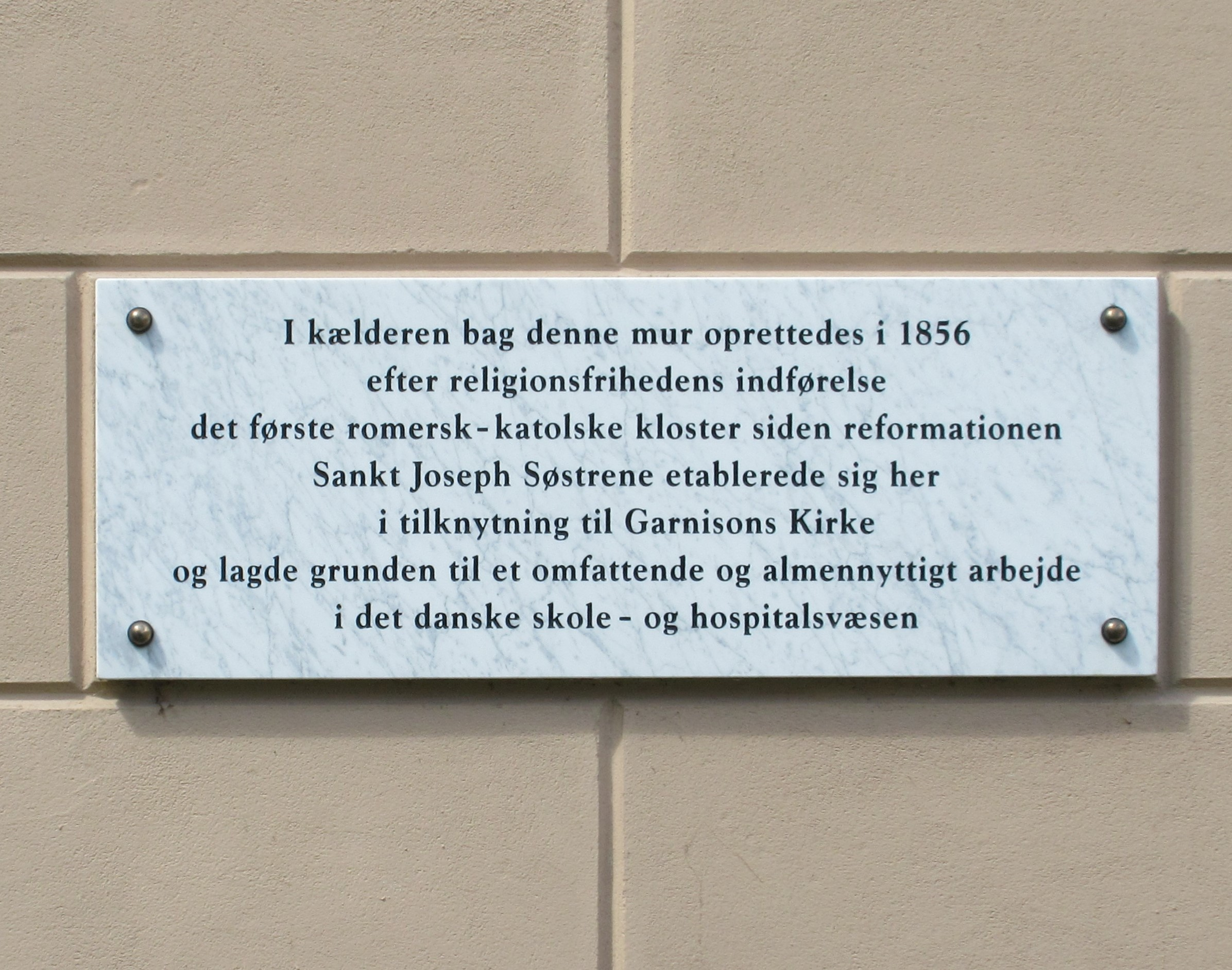
The commemorative plaque

The building has three bays on Bredgade, a rounded corner bay, 11 bays on Snakt Annæ Plads and a half-hipped, two-bay gable facing the grounds of the Garrison Square. The roof features a series of dormers. The original shop windows were a relatively new phenomenon when it was built in 1855.

On the gable facing the Garrison Church is a plaque that commemorates the four sisters of Saint Joseph who initially stayed in the building.

== Today ==
The building now contains a Montana Store in the ground floor.
