= Wilhelm Höffert =

German photographer (1832–1901)

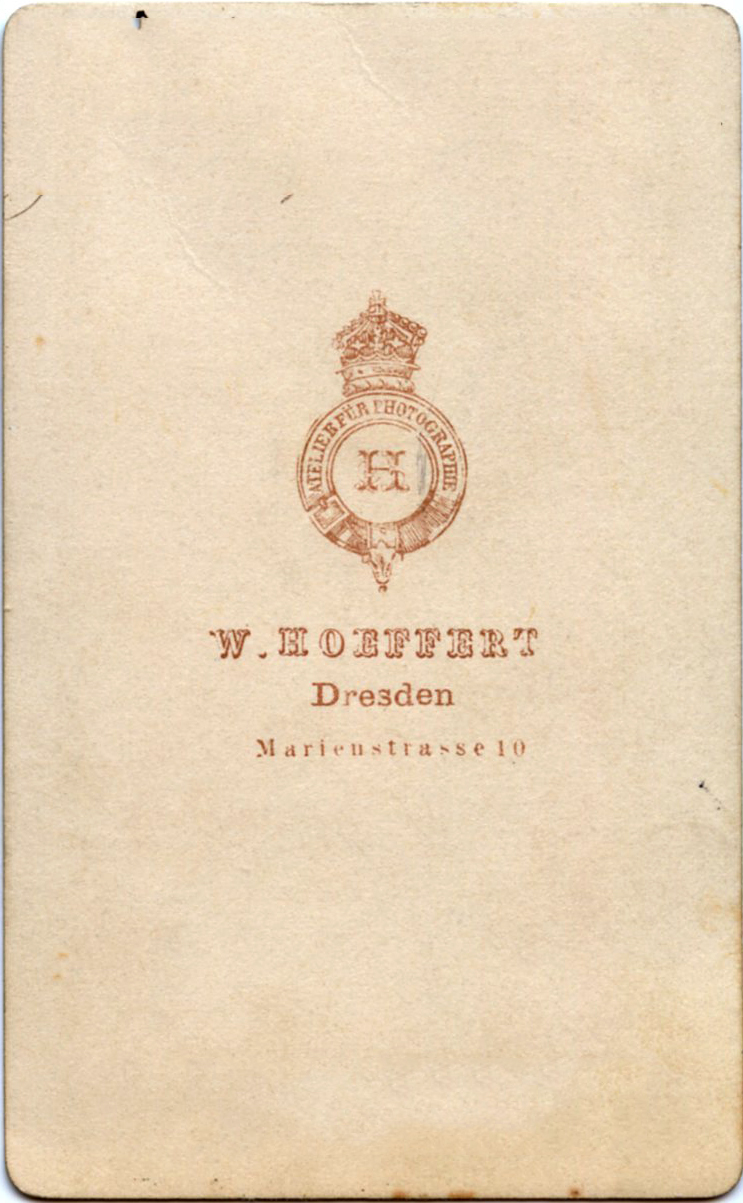
Revers CdV, initial, crown symbol, around 1866

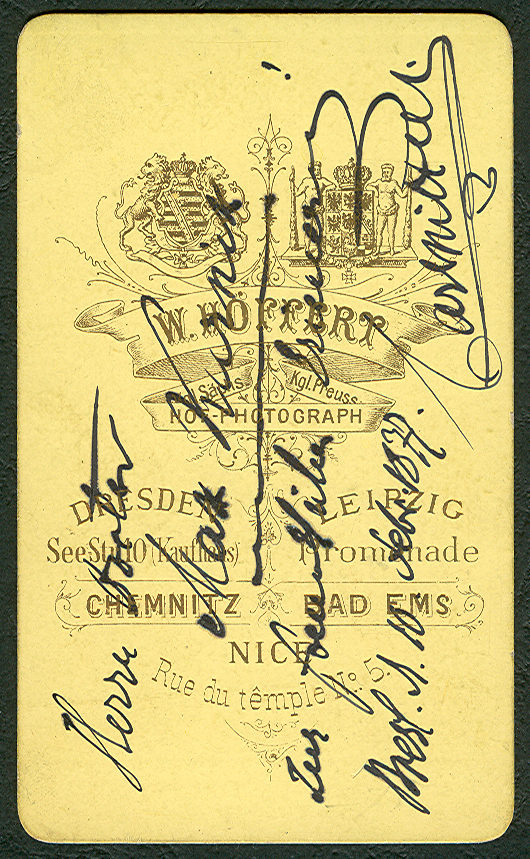
Reverse, handwritten dated beginning "[...] 1877" with a dedication to Max Kurnik

Ernst Friedrich Wilhelm Hugo Höffert (25 October 1832 – 8 April 1901) was a German photographer, who ran studios in numerous German cities.

== Life ==
Höffert's parents were actors. He was born during a theatre engagement of his parents in Stralsund. The mother was the actress Emilie Wilhelmine Johanna Louise Höffert (1808–1857), née Devrient, the daughter of the actor Ludwig Devrient. The father was the actor and director Wilhelm David Höffert. As a child, Höffert was probably accompanied by his mother, his brother Louis and sister Elise. In 1840, she was engaged at the Grand Ducal Court Theatre in Schwerin. From 1845 to 1851, she was a court actress at the Oldenburg Court Theatre.

From Oldenburg, the 16-year-old Höffert went to the Kunstakademie Düsseldorf in 1848 to be taught painting by Karl Ferdinand Sohn and Theodor Hildebrandt, who introduced him in particular to portrait painting. Hildebrandt assessed his achievements with the grade "very good". In 1850, Höffert left the art academy.

Whether Höffert had in fact subsequently spent time as a photographer in Warsaw and Russia, as his mother had assumed, is not known.

In 1860, he entered into a business partnership with the photographer and painter Moritz Unna in Gothenburg. Unna had opened a studio in Gothenburg in 1853 as a daguerreotypist, and from 1855, the address was Drottninggatan 68. The joint company traded as Unna & Höfferts Fotografiska Atelier with the address Södra Hamngatan 41. In 1863, the partnership was dissolved and Unna went to Copenhagen, where he bought the photographic studio of Rudolph Striegler.

Höffert presumably returned to Germany in the same year and opened a photographic studio in Dresden under his name. Höffert was one of the first photographers to become entrepreneurial, setting up photographic studios under the name "W. Höffert" in several cities and/or had them operated. The names of the operators/studio owners were in many cases not known, The business relationships do not seem to have been clear. Only the photographer Georg Brokesch called himself managing director of the Leipzig studio from 1872 to 1875.

From 1872 to 1884, Höffert lived in Dresden at Pragerstaße 32 and until 1889 at Lüttichaustr. 18. According to the entry in the Dresden address books, he had given procuration to his wife Mila Höffert in 1876. She is first listed as a co-owner in the Berlin and Dresden address books of 1895. It is not known which area of responsibility she had in particular.

In 1892, Höffert entered the US via New York. He was married a second time and lived in Chicago. It is not known when he left the USA again.

Even though a large number of photographs still exist today on which the name "W. Höffert" was printed, neither much is known about Höffert's life and whereabouts, nor how long he photographed or portrayed himself.

Höffert was married to Bohumila (called Mila) Wehle. She was the daughter of the Sorbs writer Jan Wjela-Radyserb/ Johann Wehle (1822–1907). From this marriage came the son Ludwig, with whom she continued the business after Höffert's death in April 1901. In 1903, presumably in the summer, Mila Höffert filed for bankruptcy. In July 1904, she was tried for fraud before the Dresden District Court. The son had evaded the proceedings by fleeing abroad.

Höffert died in Wiesbaden at the age of 68.

== W. Höffert — Ateliers und Filialen ==
- in Dresden von 1864 bis 1877 in der Marienstraße 10, from 1874 until 1890 in the Seestraße 10' in Kaufhaus Herzfeld, from 1891 until 1899 in the Prager Straße 49 and from 1900 until 1903 at the house number 7.
- in Leipzig from ca. 1869 until April 1876 in Thomaskirchhof 24" and from 15 April 1876 until 1905 in the Schlossgasse 16 in the Fashion house August Polich
- in Chemnitz from about 1872 to 1878 at Zwickauerstraße 1 im Garten and from 1879 to 1893 with the address Langestraße 18.
- in Bad Ems (start and period unknown),
- in Karlsruhe in 1875 and 1876 in der Hirschstraße 36.
- in Nice in the "Rue du temple N^{o}. 5". (1876–1881)
- In Berlin, there is evidence of the studio at Leipziger Platz 12 from 1885 to 1897, and from 1892 to 1900 in Unter den Linden 24.
- in Breslau at "Tauentzienplatz 11'" (start and period unknown),
- in Hamburg from 1881 until 1899 in the Poststraße 5b/Jungfernstieg 6 (ab 1885 Jungfernstieg 12)/Stadtwassermühle 5 and from 1900 to 1902 in the Esplanade 47, Alsterthor 14/16
- in Hanover in the "Georgstraße 9", first entry in the address book's list of residents in 1879 with the note "Prok.: Ehefr. Höffert, Mila, née Wehle", from 1885 "Archit. Wilhelm Sültenfuß", from 1889 at number 14, from 1901 number 8, from 1892 "Inh. Photogr. Jul. Benade", from 1894 Wilhelm Höffert and wife Mila, from 1897 instead of the wife the son "Ing. und Photogr. Paul Ludw. Höffert", from 1902 "We.[Witwe] Mila Höffert, geb. Wehle" and son, from 1904 "Lemförderstraße 1", from 1905 "Wihelm Höffert Nachf.", Alfred von Carlowitz-Hartitzsch,
- in Magdeburg in the "Breiteweg 196/197", (start and period unknown)
- in Bonn, from 30 July 1900 to 1901 in the "Coblenzerstr. ",
- in Düsseldorf, "Alleestraße 40", First entry in the address book (trade) of 1897. The entry "Höffert, Wilhelm Ehefr., geb. Wehle", from 1899 "Höffert, Wilhelm, Hofphotograph", later owner Julius Staegemann.
- in Cologne from 1896 bis ca. 1906 in der Hohestraße 55 (later Hohestraße 111a).
- in Potsdam, "Humboldtstr. 1", subsequent owner C. Wohlatz

On the backs of some of the photographs, Munich is still indicated as the location of the studio.

After the insolvency of W. Höffert, in some locations the operators continued the studios using the name W.[ilhelm] Höffert Nachf.[olger], for example in Leipzig the photographers E. & M. Foerstner (or Förstner) initially at Schloßgasse 1/corner of Petersbrücke, from 1906 to 1907 at the address Barfußgasse 15, in Düsseldorf and in Hamburg Johann Kagel from 1903 to 1906. in "Alstertor 14/16". The address book of the city of Bonn in 1903 verzeichnet den Fotografen Ferd[inand] Bauer in der Coblenzerstr. 8a als Inhaber von "W. Höffert".

=== Known assistants and apprentices ===
The photographer Nicola Perscheid had been employed as a photographer's assistant in Höffert's Dresden studio in Seestrasse for two years before opening his own studio in 1891.

In 1894/95, the later successful photographer Hugo Erfurth completed a one-year apprenticeship at Höffert's.

=== Court photographer ===
- As Crown Prince, the later King Albert of Saxony Wilhelm Höffert (around 1872, exact date not known) the title of Kingdom of Saxony Court pohotographer.
- A few years later (date unknown), Höffert indicated by depicting the coat of arms that he had also been appointed by the Kingdom of Prussia Court Photographer.
- Later (date unknown) he also depicted the coat of arms of the Prince of Wales page and later King Edward VII, which identified him as a purveyor to the court for photographs.
- The fourth coat of arms shown identifies W. Höffert as a purveyor to the court of the House of Mecklenburg-Schwerin.
- Prince Friedrich Leopold of Prussia.
- Prince Maximilian of Baden.

== Photographs ==
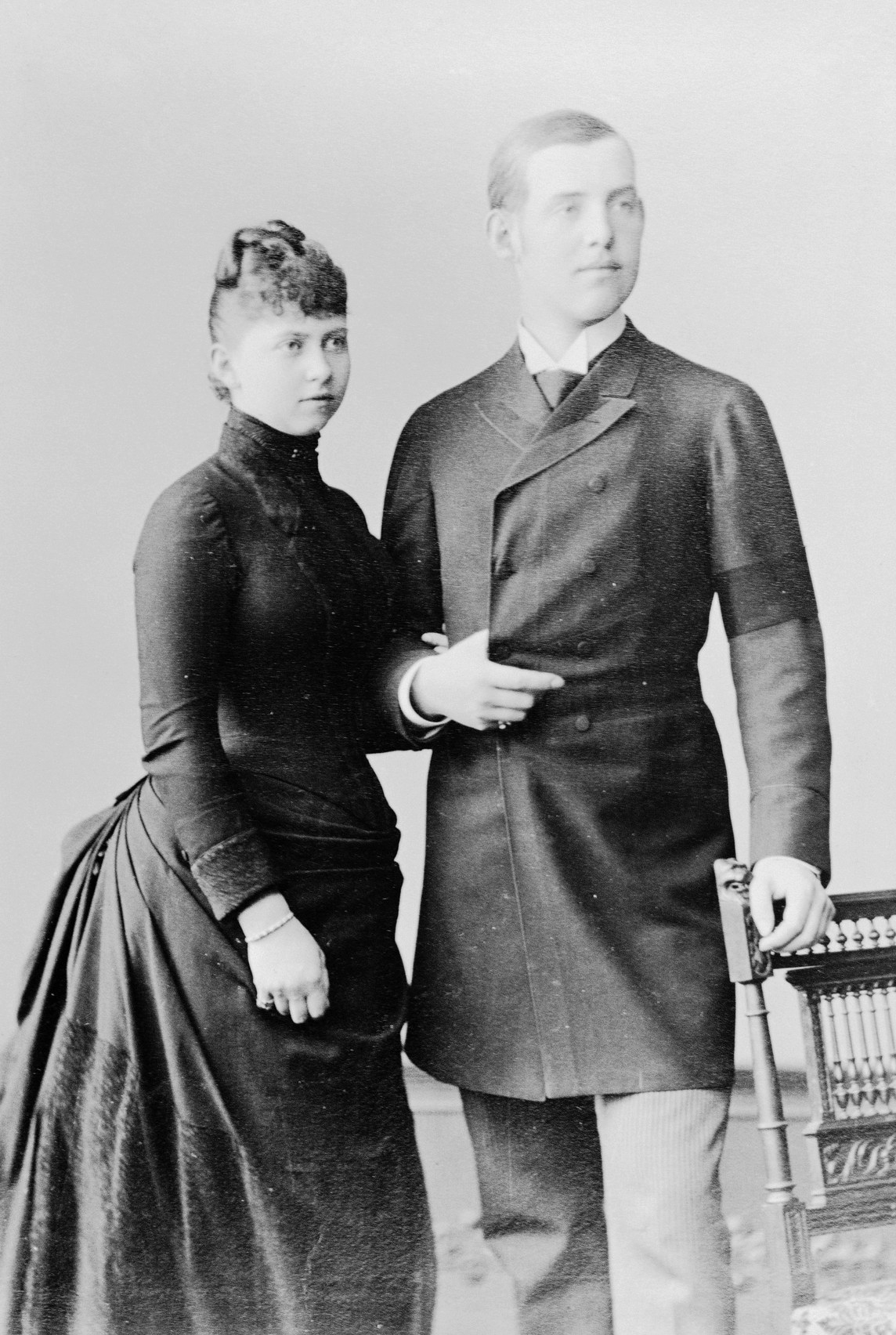
Princess Sophia of Prussia and the futur Constantine I of Greece (September 1888)

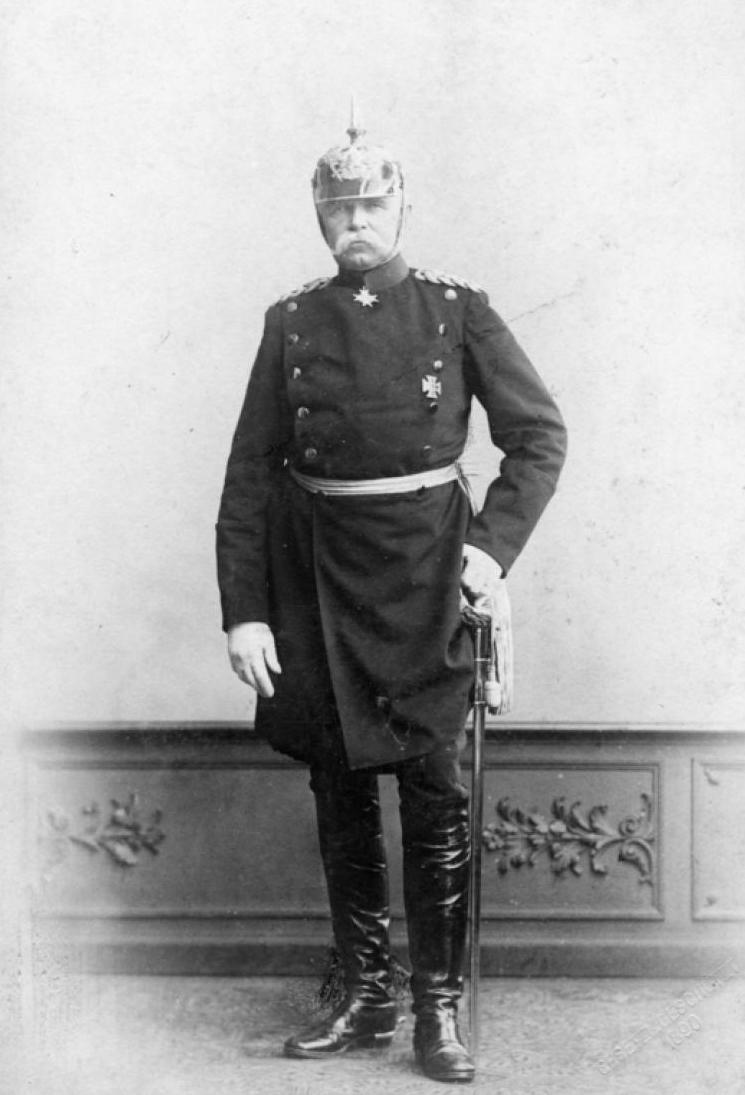
Chancellor Leo von Caprivi (January 1890)

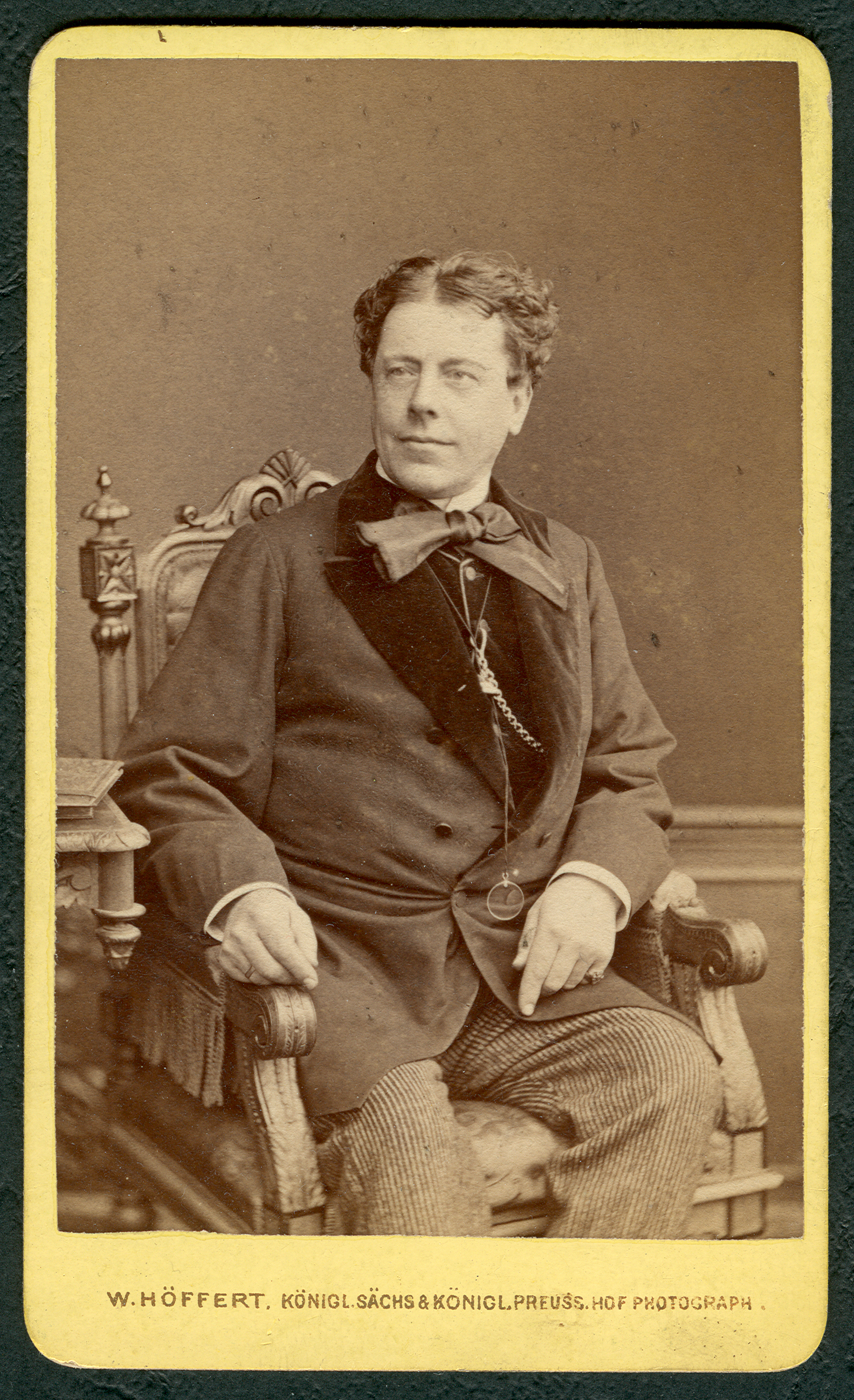
Actor Carl Mittell

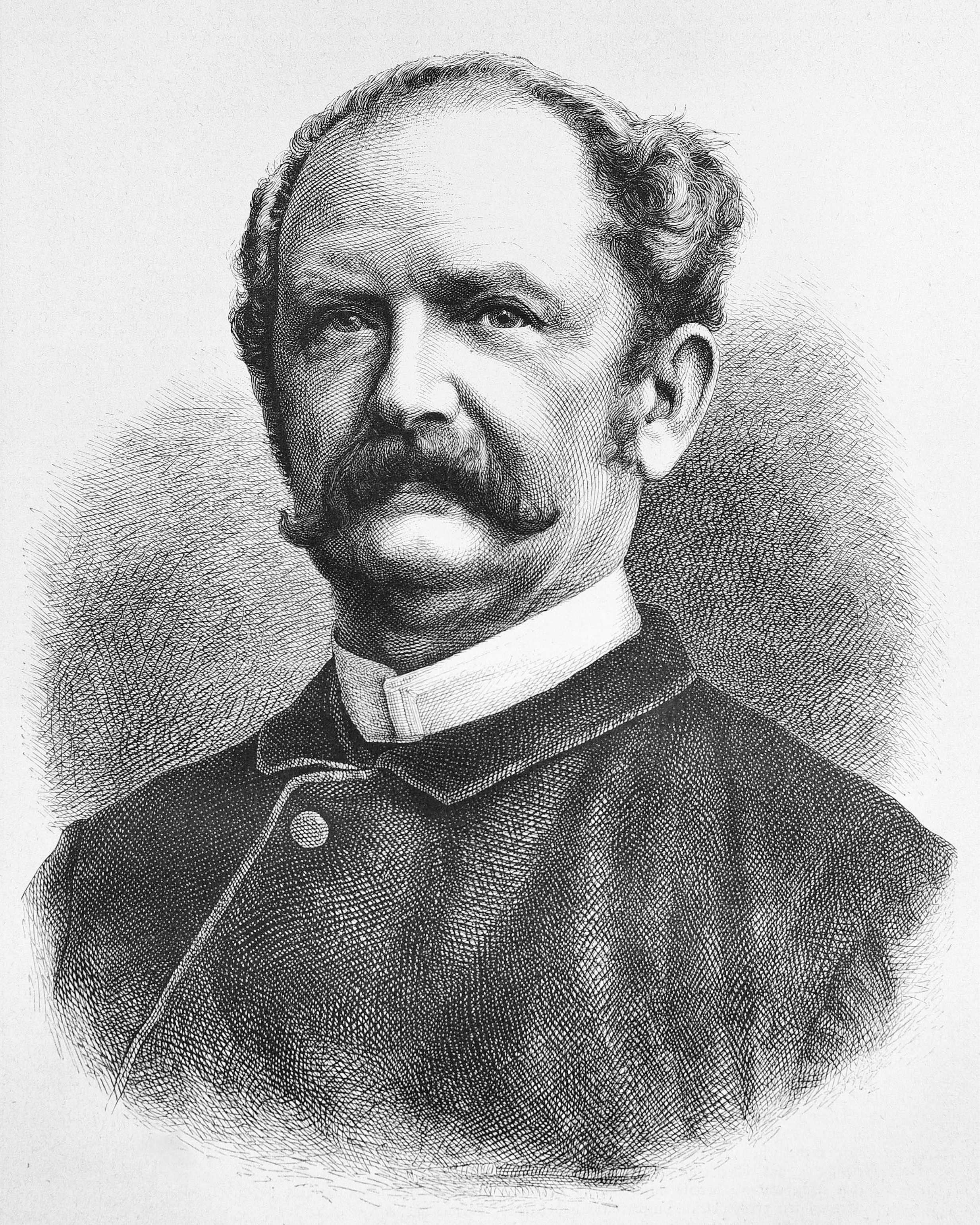
Ernst Keil, founder, publisher and editor-in-chief of Die Gartenlaube

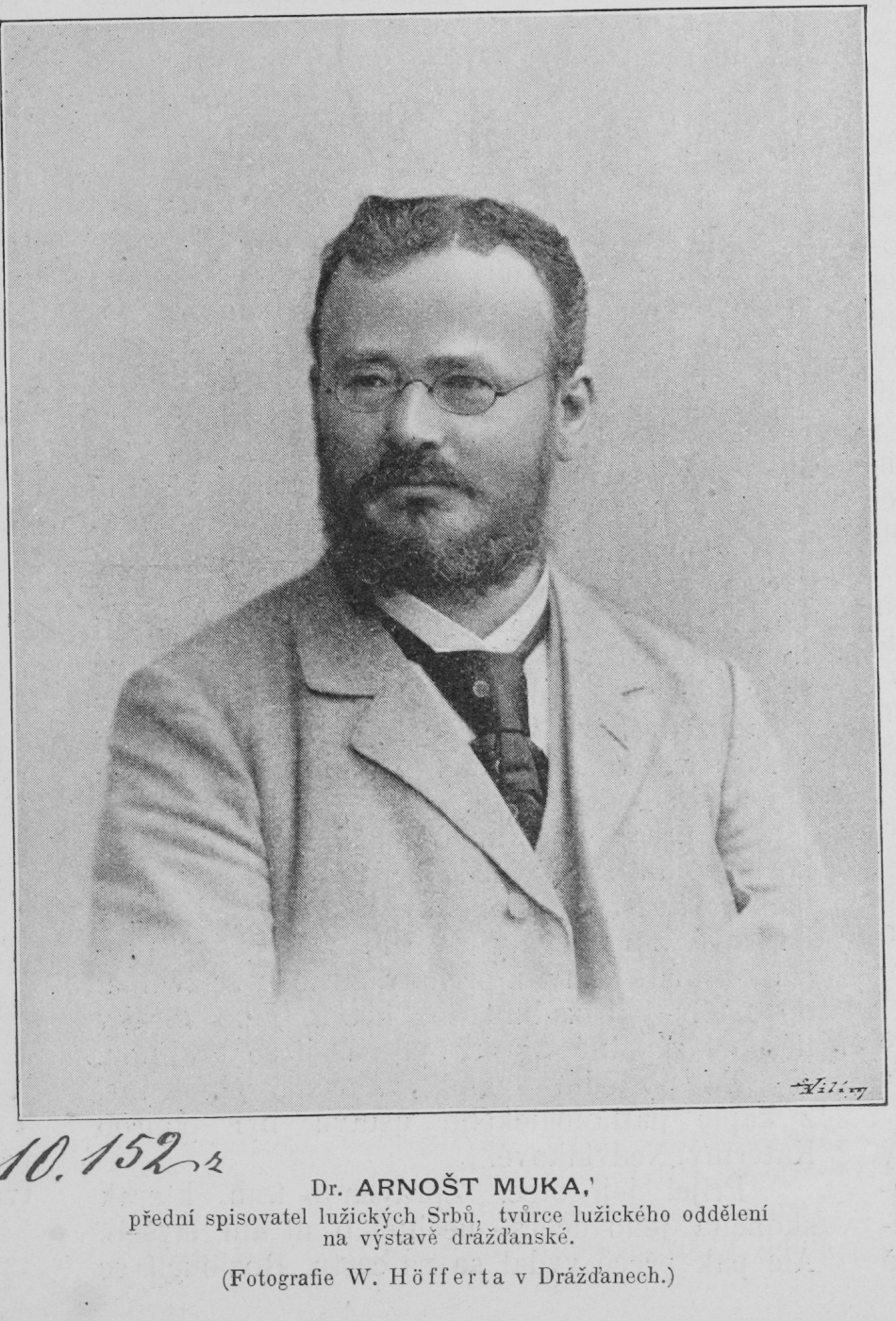
Writer Arnošt Muka (1896)

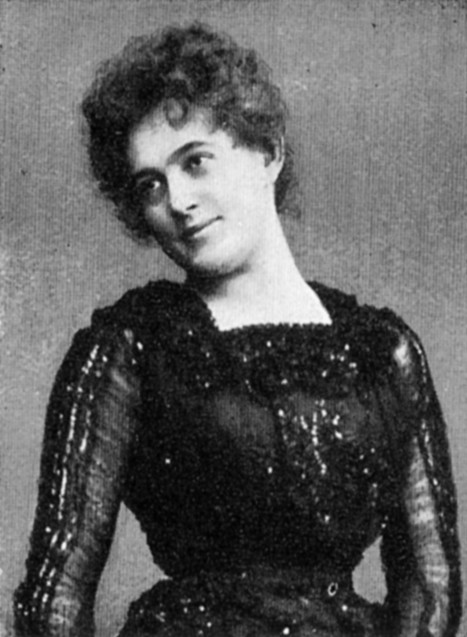
Actress Agnes Sorma

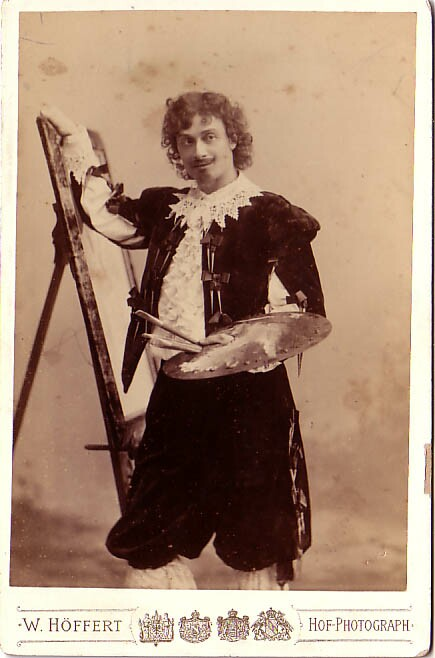
Actor Josef Kainz

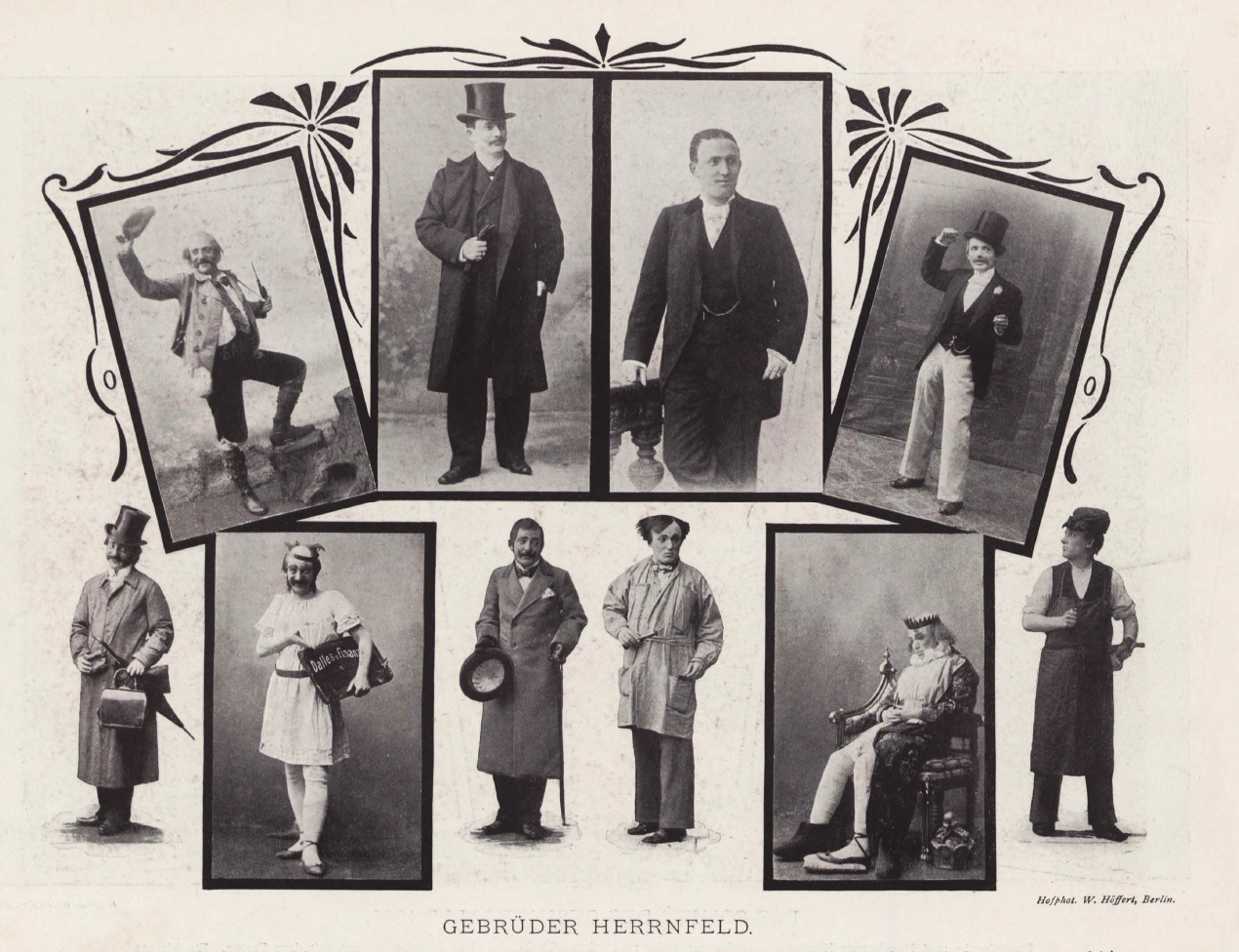
The Gebrüder-Herrnfeld-Theater, actors and dramaturges (1898)

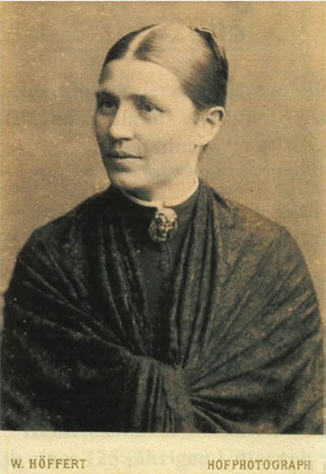
The businesswoman Agathe Zeis

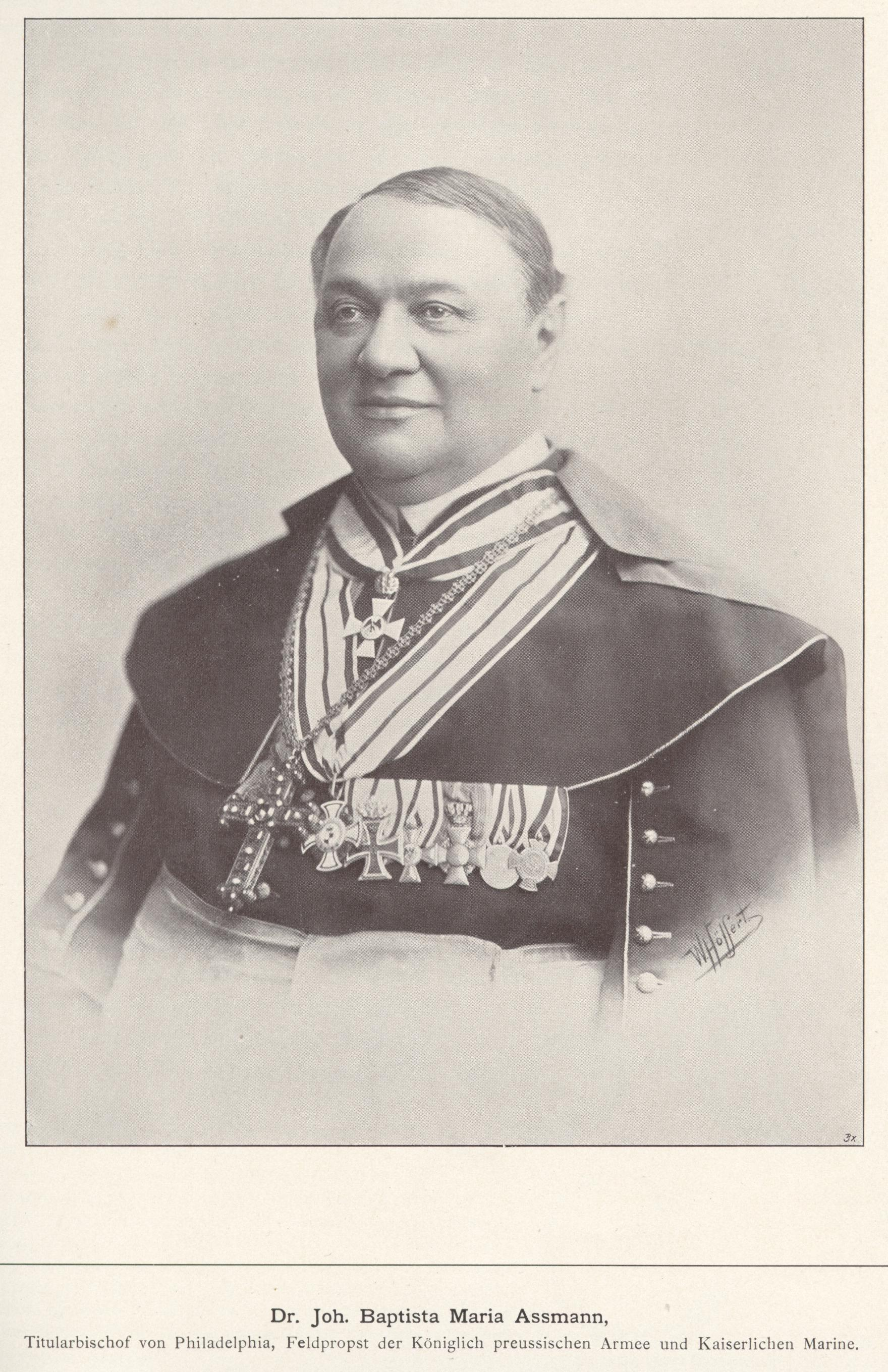
Military bishop Johannes Maria Assmann

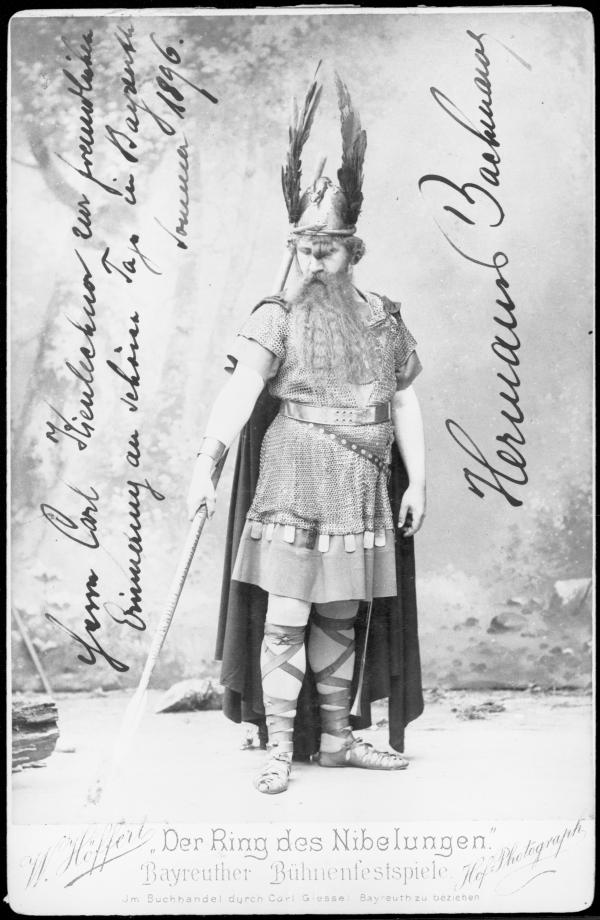
Opera singer Hermann Bachmann in Der Ring des Nibelungen (part of Hagen von Tronje)

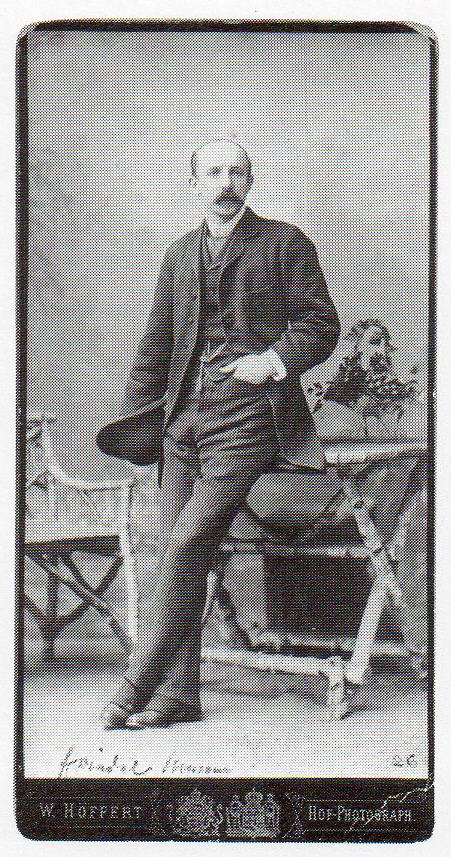
Friedrich Mann, who inspired Christian Buddenbrook's character from the novel Buddenbrooks (1901) by Thomas Mann.
