= Georg Brokesch =

German photographer

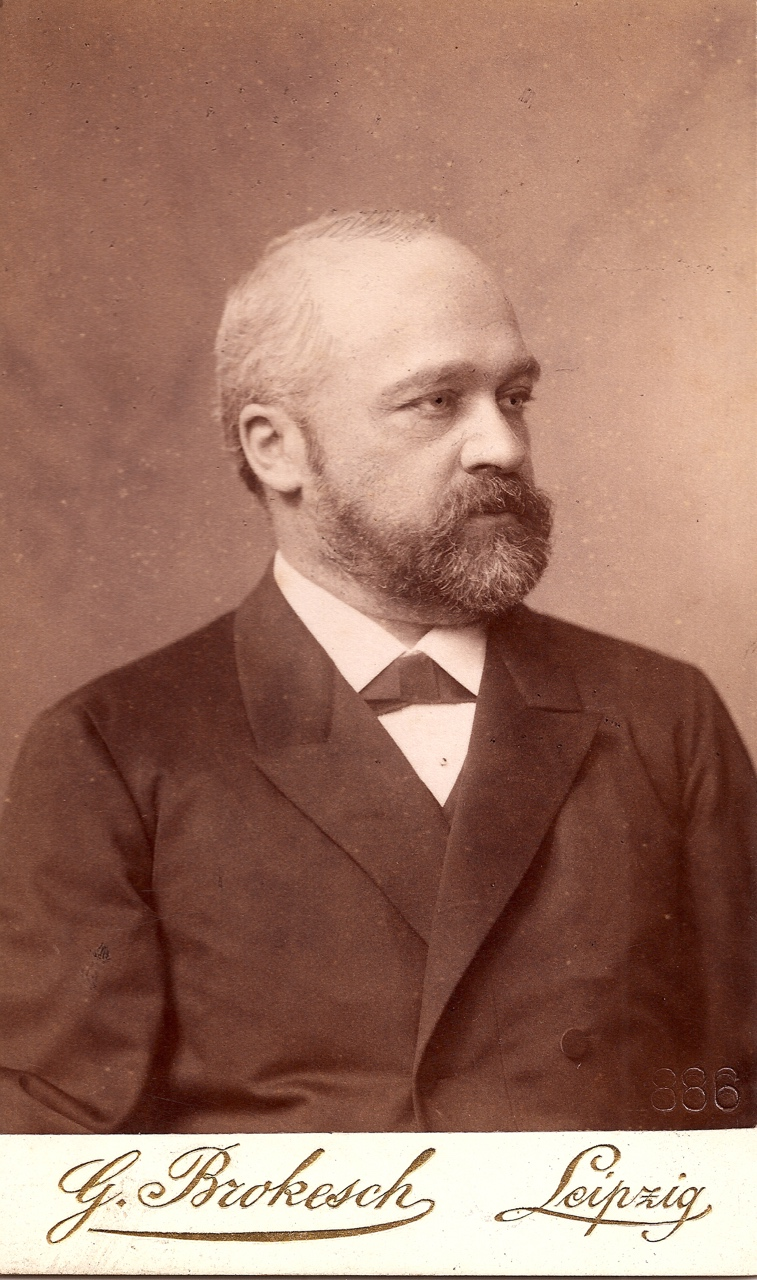
Oskar von Bülow, Atelier Georg Brokesch Leipzig 1886

Georg Conrad Adolph Brokesch (24 November 1849 – 29 January 1896) was a 19th-century German photographer.

== Life ==
Brokesch was born in Hanover. Little is known about his life.

The name Brokesch first appears in the Leipzig address book of 1871. The address given was identical with that of the studio of the photographer Wilhelm Höffert. From 1872 to 1875, Brokesch is identified as "managing director of the photographic studio W. Höffert". When Höffert moved his premises to the Polich department stores' in 1876, Brokesch moved into his own studio on the ground floor at Zeitzer Straße 19c. In 1881, the address was then Zeitzer Straße 48, the numbering of which was changed to Zeitzer Straße 2 in 1885.

From 1892, the photographer Karl Friedrich Wunder from Hanover indicated the address of Georg Brokesch's studio. In the same year, the studio is registered for the first time in the "Handel" department. From 1905 onwards the note: "Karl Wunder (Hannover) Inhaber" is found. At present, nothing is known about the form of the cooperation. From 1914, Wilhelm Weiß indicates Georg Brokesch as the owner of the studio.

The photographer Paul Spalke (1858–1915) was temporarily, before 1 October 1896, managing director of the photographic studio.

Brokesch portrayed numerous musicians, including Edvard Grieg, Adolph Brodsky, Adolf Ruthardt

From 1885 onwards, for a few years, an A.[nton] Brokesch can be found in the address book, who lived in Leipzig in Körnerstraße and gave photographer as his profession.

Brokesch died in Heidelberg at the age of 47.

=== Prizes/Honours ===
- Ehrenpreis anlässlich der Leipziger Kunstgewerbe-Ausstellung, (opened 15 May 1879), (not verified).
- Dresden 1879, (nicht verifiziert).
- Honorary Award for Excellence in Photography, Deutscher Photographen-Verein, 1880, (Nürnberg?) (not verified).
- Hamburg 1881, (not verified).
- Médailles d’argent of the Association Belge de Photographie on the occasion of the 2me Exposition Internationale de Photographie, Opened from 15 August 1883, in Palais des Beaux-Arts, in Brussel.
- Braunschweig 1886, (not verified).
- Medal der Royal Photographic Society, London, exhibition from 4 October to 13 November 1886, Pall Mall East.
- Second Class Gold Medal at the International Photographic Exhibition in Florence in 1887.
- Honorary Prize of the Clubs der Amateur-Photographen, Vienna, 1890, (not verified).
- Genf 1893, (not verified).

=== Participation in exhibitions ===
- Internationale Ausstellung künstlerischer Photographien in Vienna 1891. Brokesch präsentierte dort das großformatiges Genrebild Die Bibelstunde.

=== Membership ===
- Recorded in June 1882 in the Photographische Gesellschaft in Vienna.

== Sources ==
- Adressbücher von Leipzig.
- Marktkirche (Hannover): "Kirchenbuch". Taufen. Nr. 229/1850.
- Aegidienkirche (Hannover): "Kirchenbuch". Heiraten. Nr. 6/1875.
