= Kongens Klub =

Gentlemen's club

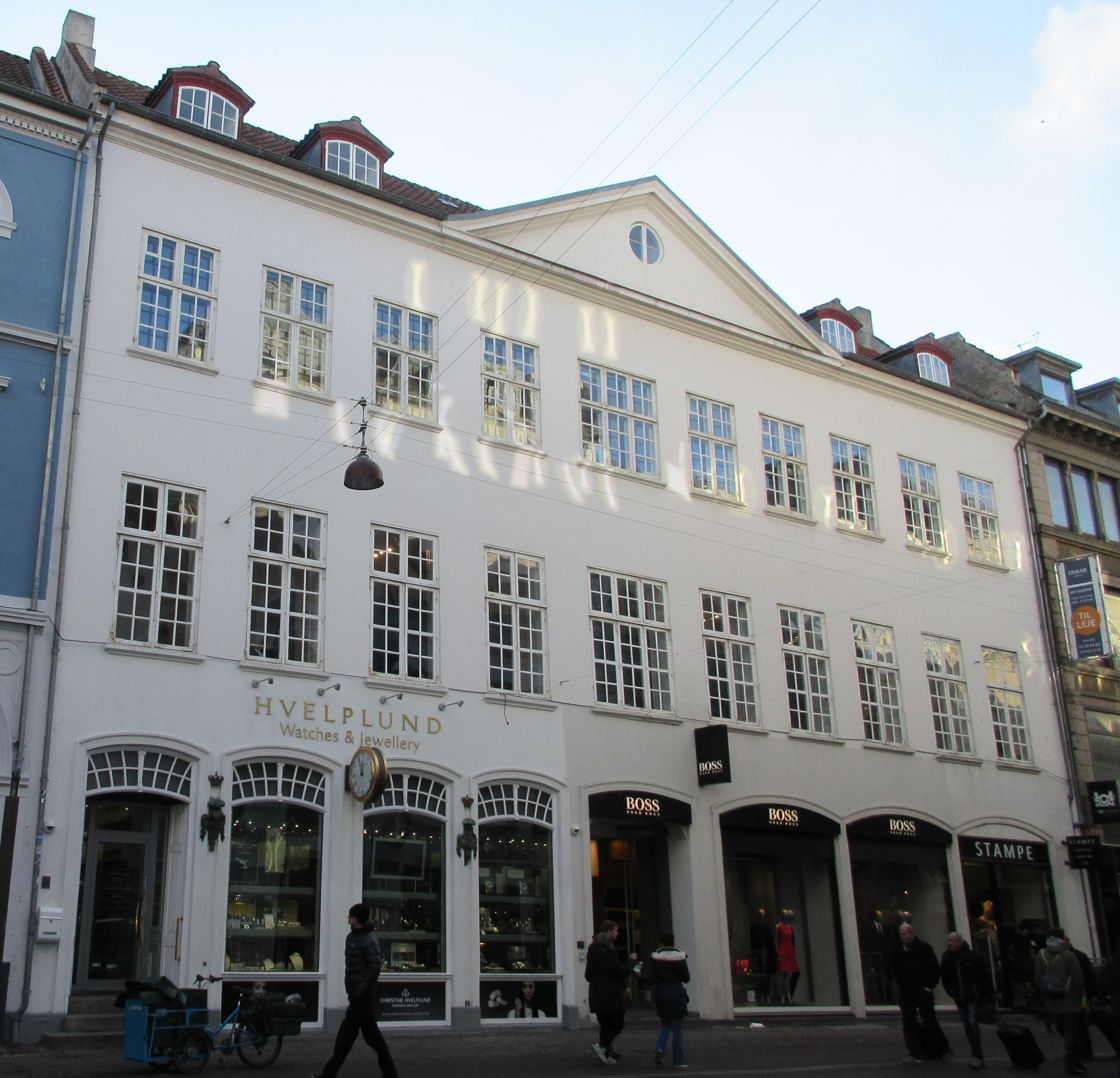
The Royal Club's former building at Østergade 15 in Copenhagen

Kongens Klub was a gentlemen's club founded in 1776 in Copenhagen, Denmark. The club was until the late 1840s based in the Karel van Mander House at Østergade 15. It existed until 1877 when it was merged with Det forenede borgerlige Selskab (founded in 1798) under the name Kjøbenhavns Klub ("Copenhagen Club).

== History ==
=== Early history ===
The club was founded in 1776 by a circle of former members of Drejer's Club. It was initially known as Fich's Club (Fichs Klub) or Selskabet i Mad. Schrecks Gaard. The latter name was a reference to Gottlieb Schreck who had purchased the Karel van Mander House at Østergade 15 in 1775. He had adapted the interior for use by the club. The club initially had 25 members but in 1778, when the first statutes were adopted, the number of members had grown to 80. The members included Jens Nørregaard and Jacob Rahbek. On 16 November 1782, the club was granted permission to use the name Kongens Klub (Royal Club). The club soon became a meetingplace for members of the higher middle class. The activities included concerts and the club also had a library of considerably size. Membership of the club was only available to men but each member could bring two women per ticket at concerts.

In 1795, Kongens Klub merged with Det forenede Venneselskab, another gentlemen's club which had been founded in 1794 but whose premises at Amagertorv had been destroyed in the Copenhagen Fire of 1795. In 1842, the Royal Club was also merged with Drejer's Club.

=== New premises at Kongens Nytorv and Vesterbrogade ===
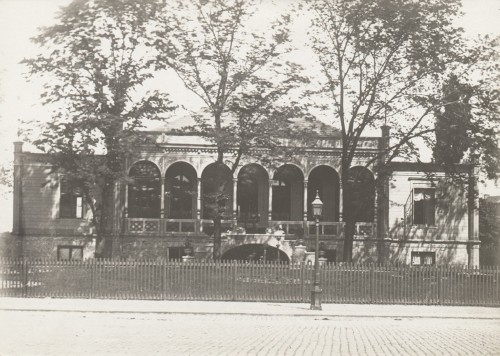
Kongens Klub in Vesterbro

In 1846, Royal Club obtained permission to construct a summer venue outside the city's Western City Gate (Vesterbrogade 2). Its wintertime premises moved from Østergade 15 to Kongens Nytorv 13. Det Sjællandske Jernbaneselskab (The Zealand Railway Company) took over the site in connection with the construction of the Copenhagen's new central station in 1863–64. The pavilion was dismantled and rebuilt at the eastern corner of Vesterbrogade with the new Farimagsvej (where Axeltorv is today, approximately 200 metres closer to the city.. The building was sold in 1872 and was then operated as an entertainment venue under the names Café Boulevard and later Concert du Boulevard. In 1883, it was demolished to make way for the construction of the concert venue National (later National Scala).

=== Disestablishment ===
In 1877, Royal Club merged with Det forenede borgerlige Selskab (founded in 1798) under the name Kjøbenhavns Klub (Copenhagen Club). Notable members in 1877 included J.C. Hauberg, Christian Severin Henrichsen, S.W. Isberg, and A.C. Perch.
