= Hansen, Schou & Weller =

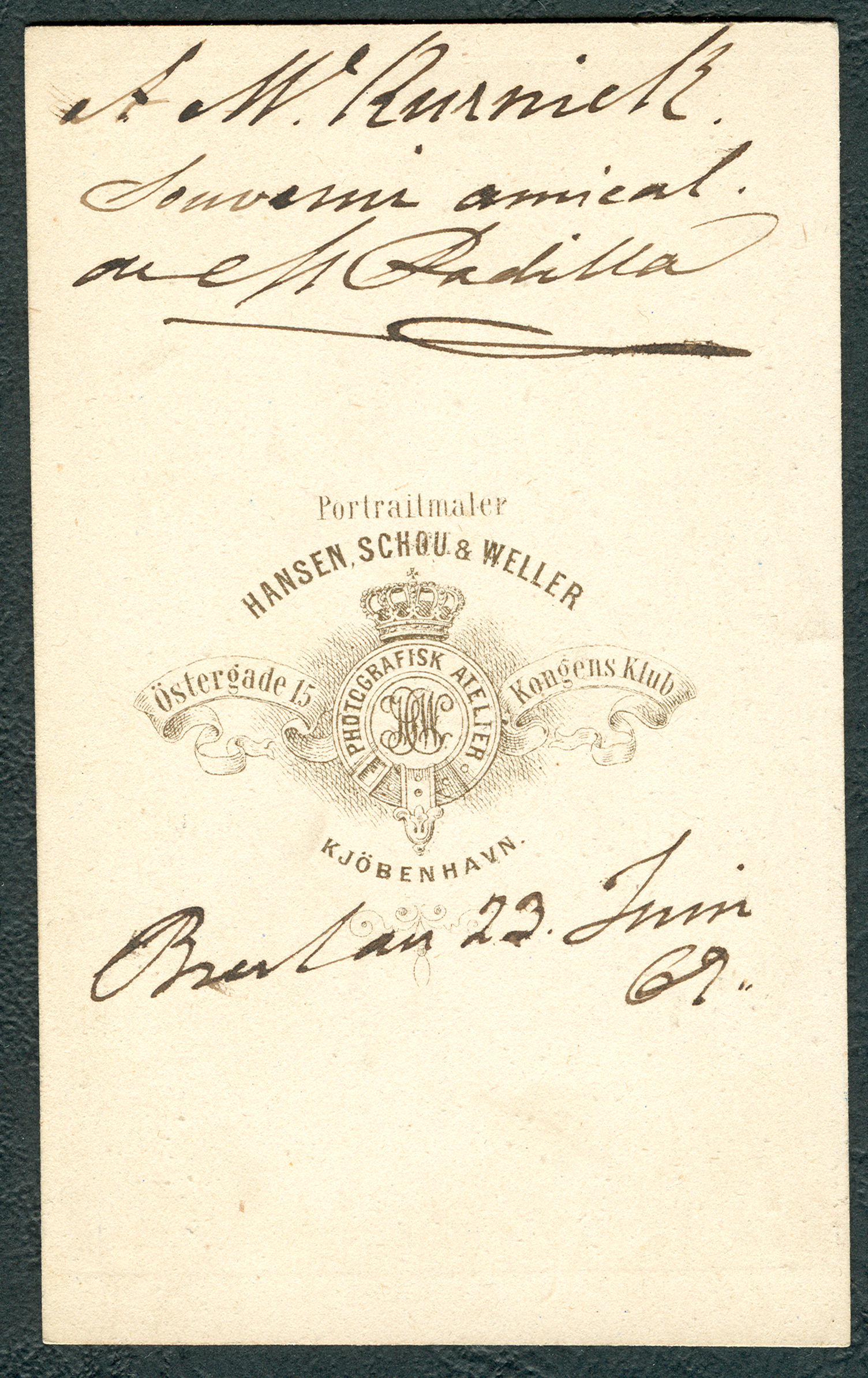
Reverse of the company's visiting card, dedicated by the singer Mariano Padilla to the critic Max Kurnik

Hansen, Schou & Weller was a photographic studio in Copenhagen. Many celebrities sat for portraits there in the last decades of the 19th century.

== History ==
Niels Christian Hansen (a portrait painter), his brother Georg Emil Hansen and the lieutenant-turned-businessman Albert Schou founded the studio on 1 December 1867. It was originally called "Hansen & Schou". In 1869, Clemens Weller, a native of Germany, joined the firm. He was originally a bookbinder, but had learned photography from Georg Hansen. At that point the company became known as "Hansen, Schou and Weller".

On 14 April 1869, the firm received a Royal warrant of appointment. In 1872, they participated in the Nordic Industrial and Art Exhibition in Copenhagen. In later years, they were known as "Hansen & Weller". In 1885, the studio moved into the Berckentin Palace. Weller eventually became the sole owner. He specialized in portraits of celebrities and the aristocracy. On his death in 1900, he left approximately 360,000 carefully preserved photographic plates.

Many of the plates are now in the Danish Royal Library. Many more are in the archives of the ETH Zürich, the Royal Collection and the National Portrait Gallery (London).

== Selected portraits ==
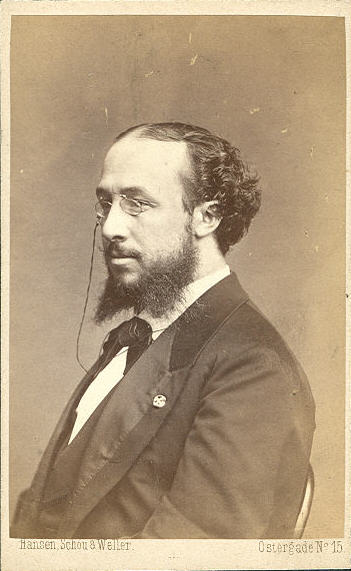
Opera Singer
Mariano Padilla

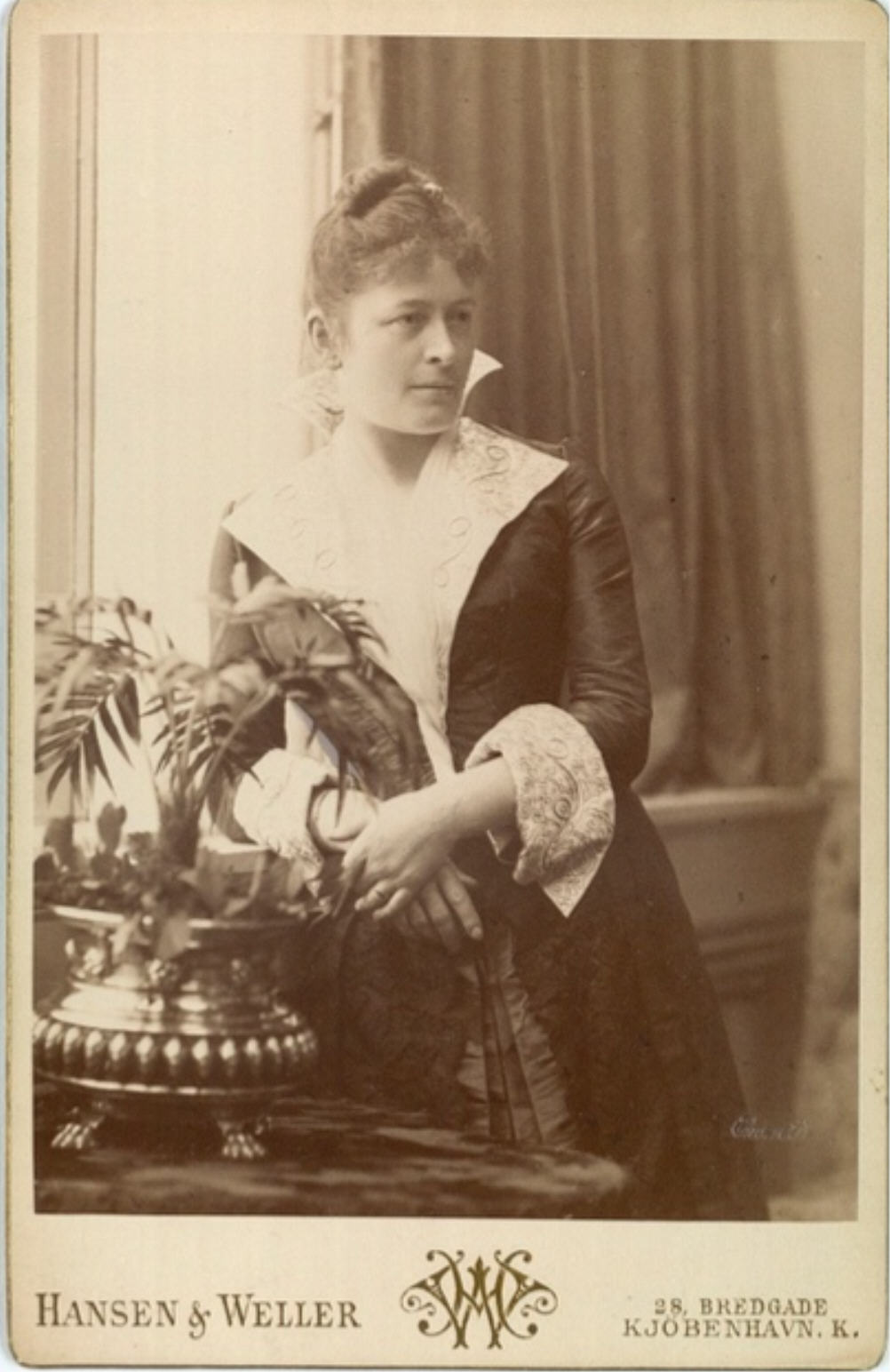
Painter Bertha Wegmann

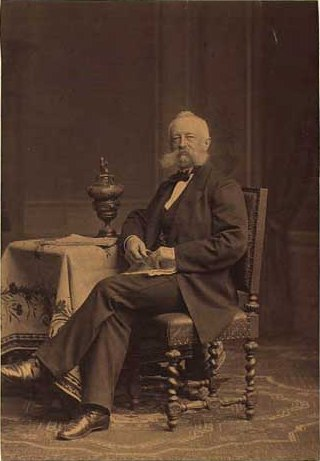
Prime Minister Ludvig Holstein-Holsteinborg

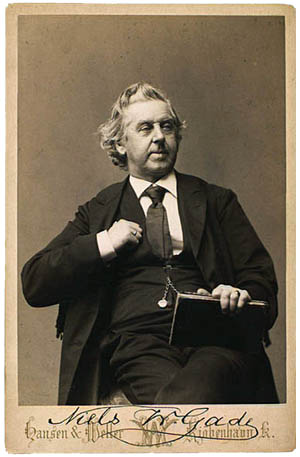
Composer
Niels Wilhelm Gade

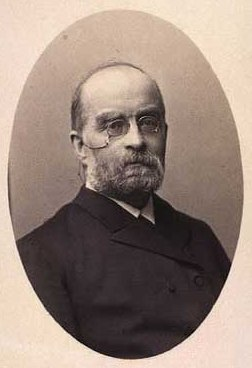
Psychologist Carl Lange

== See also ==
- Photography in Denmark
