= Julius Lange (art historian) =

Danish art historian and critic

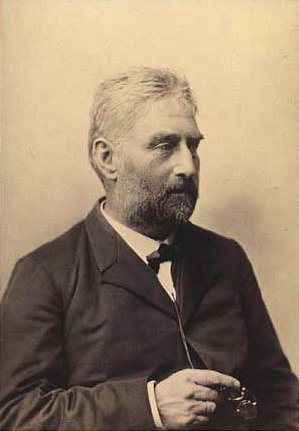
Julius Lange by Hansen, Schou & Weller (sometime after 1889)

Julius Henrik Lange (19 June 1838, Vordingborg – 19 August 1896, Copenhagen) was a Danish art historian and critic.

== Life ==
In 1858, he began his studies at the University of Copenhagen. A few years later, he accompanied a wealthy gentleman to Italy and, while there, developed an interest in art history. In 1870, he became a lecturer at the Royal Danish Academy of Fine Arts and, a year later, transferred to the University. In 1877, he became a member of the Royal Danish Academy of Sciences and Letters.

His brother was Carl Lange, the psychologist.

== Works ==
He wrote about ancient and contemporary art. Some of his outstanding works were:

- Michelangelo og Marmoret (Michelangelo and Marble, 1871)
- Om Kunstværdi (About the Value of Art, 1876)
- Vor Kunst og Udlandets (Our Arts and the Foreign, 1879),
- Det ioniske Kapitäls Oprindelse og Forhistorie (Origins and Pre-history of the Ionic Capital, 1877)
- Guder og Mennesker hos Homer (God and Men in Homer, 1881)
- Sergel og Thorvaldsen (Sergel and Thorvaldsen, 1885)
- Bastien-Lepage og andre Afhandlinger, (Bastien Lepage and Other Essays, 1889)
- Billedkunstens Fremstilling af Menneskeskikkelsen i dens ældste Periode, (Representation of the Human Figure in its Earliest Period, 1892)

Collections of his letters were published in 1903 and 1904. They have recently been reprinted as Breve fra Julius Lange, Kessinger (2010) ISBN 1-1653-4747-4
