= Clemens Weller =

Frantz Clemens Stephan Weller was a German born Danish Photographer

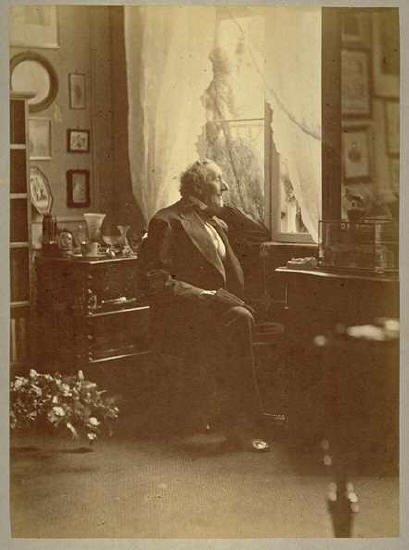
Hans Christian Andersen, by Weller (1874)

Frantz Clemens Stephan Weller (17 May 1838, Neustadt - 17 July 1900, Copenhagen) was a German-born Danish photographer.

== Biography ==
He was a bookbinder and probably learned his trade in France as a teenager. In 1860, he moved to Copenhagen and, at some point, became a Danish citizen. He Initially worked for the photographer, Georg Emil Hansen, pasting and binding photographs, but apparently studied photography as well, as a letter from the poet, Nicolai Bøgh to Hans Christian Andersen, from 1866, mentions a "certificate" for Weller.

In 1867, Georg joined with his brother, Niels Christian (a painter), and a bookseller's clerk named Albert Schou, to create the firm "Hansen & Schou". Two years later, Weller became a partner in the firm, which was renamed Hansen, Schou & Weller. That same year, they received a Royal warrant of appointment, making them the official court photographers. In 1872, they participated in the Nordic Industry and Art Exhibition (Copenhagen) and, in 1875, received a bronze medal at a similar exhibition in Vienna.

Schou left the company in 1885, to pursue a freelance career, and Niels retired in 1889, to take up his former occupation. Weller remained, and the firm was once again renamed, as "Hansen & Weller". In addition to the Royal appointment, Georg had built up a solid base of customers in the House of Glücksburg and the associated bourgeoisie. Hans Christian Andersen was also a regular customer. Weller was in charge of most of this business and saved all of his photographic plates so, by the time of his death, he had amassed a collection of thousands of plates, all carefully wrapped and stored.

In 1897, he was unanimously elected Chairman of the Dansk Fotografisk Forening. After his death, his collection of negatives was sorted and sold. Approximately 660 of them, depicting members of the Danish and foreign nobilities, was acquired by the photographer, Peter Elfelt, and may now be seen at the Royal Library.

== Sources ==
- Bjørn Ochsner: Fotografer i og fra Danmark til og med år 1920, 1986, ISBN 87-552-1216-6
- Mette Sandbye (Ed.), Dansk Fotografihistorie, Copenhagen: Gyldendal 2004, ISBN 87-00-39586-2
