= Georg Emil Hansen =

Danish photographer (1833–1891)

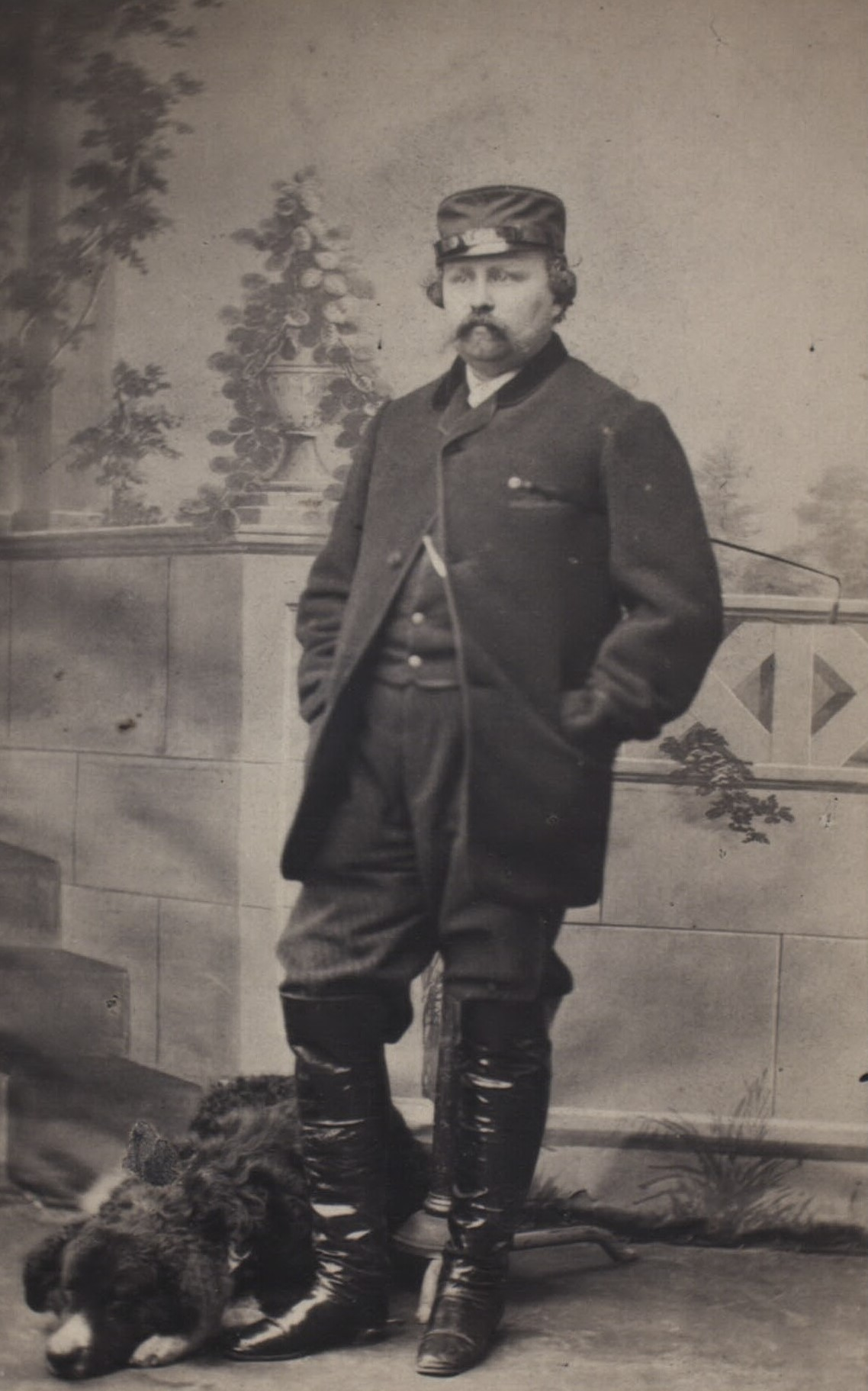
Georg E. Hansen: self photographic portrait

Georg Emil Hansen (12 May 1833 – 21 December 1891) was one of Denmark's pioneering photographers in the second half of the 19th century. He had his own studio in Copenhagen and later became a successful court photographer.

== Early life ==
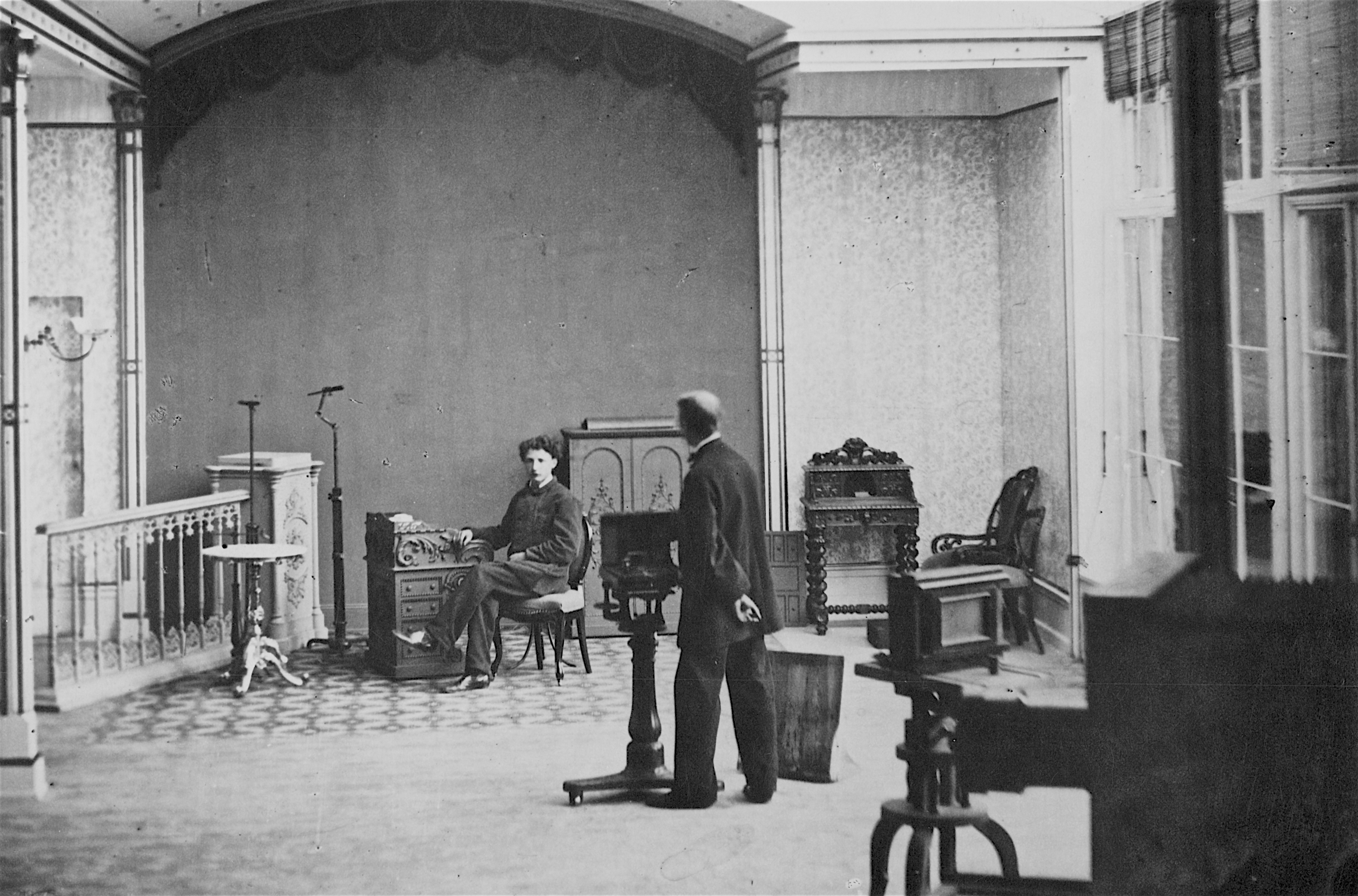
Georg E. Hansen's studio in Bredgade

A native of Naestved in southern Sealand, he learnt the art of daguerreotyping from his father, C.C. Hansen, who had begun to produce daguerreotypes in 1849. After studying photography in Germany, in 1854 he helped his father set up a studio near Kongens Nytorv in the centre of Copenhagen. The new equipment he had brought back from Germany was of considerable assistance.

In 1856, he opened a studio of his own, first located at Bredgade 22 and later in Østergade. In 1867, he joined with his brother Niels Christian Hansen (a portrait painter) and Albert Schou (a businessman) to create the famous studio that (with the addition of Clemens Weller) would be known as Hansen, Schou & Weller.

== Court photographer ==
He later became a court photographer, taking photographs of royalty in Denmark, England, Russia and Greece. He was particularly successful in selling prints of the Danish royal family in the carte de visite format. It is estimated that he sold some 37,000 prints of the young Princess Alexandra when she married Crown Prince Edward in 1863. He died in Frederiksberg.

== Hans Christian Andersen ==
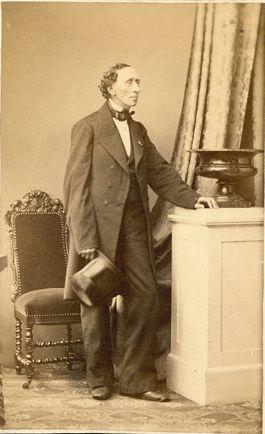
Georg E. Hansen: H.C. Andersen (1862)

Hans Christian Andersen was very interested in photography. From the very beginning he had invited photographers to take his portrait.

He posed on many occasions for Hansen between 1860 and 1874. In his diary entry for 19 July 1862, Andersen records: "Went to Hansen who photographed me; got 24 portraits".

== See also ==
- Photography in Denmark
- History of photography
