= Niels Christian Hansen =

Danish painter (1834–1922)

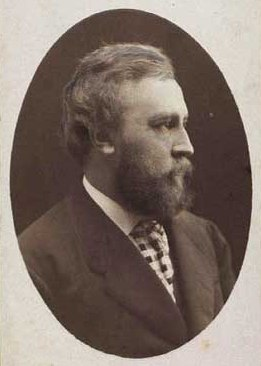
Niels Christian Hansen, by his brother Georg (1870s)

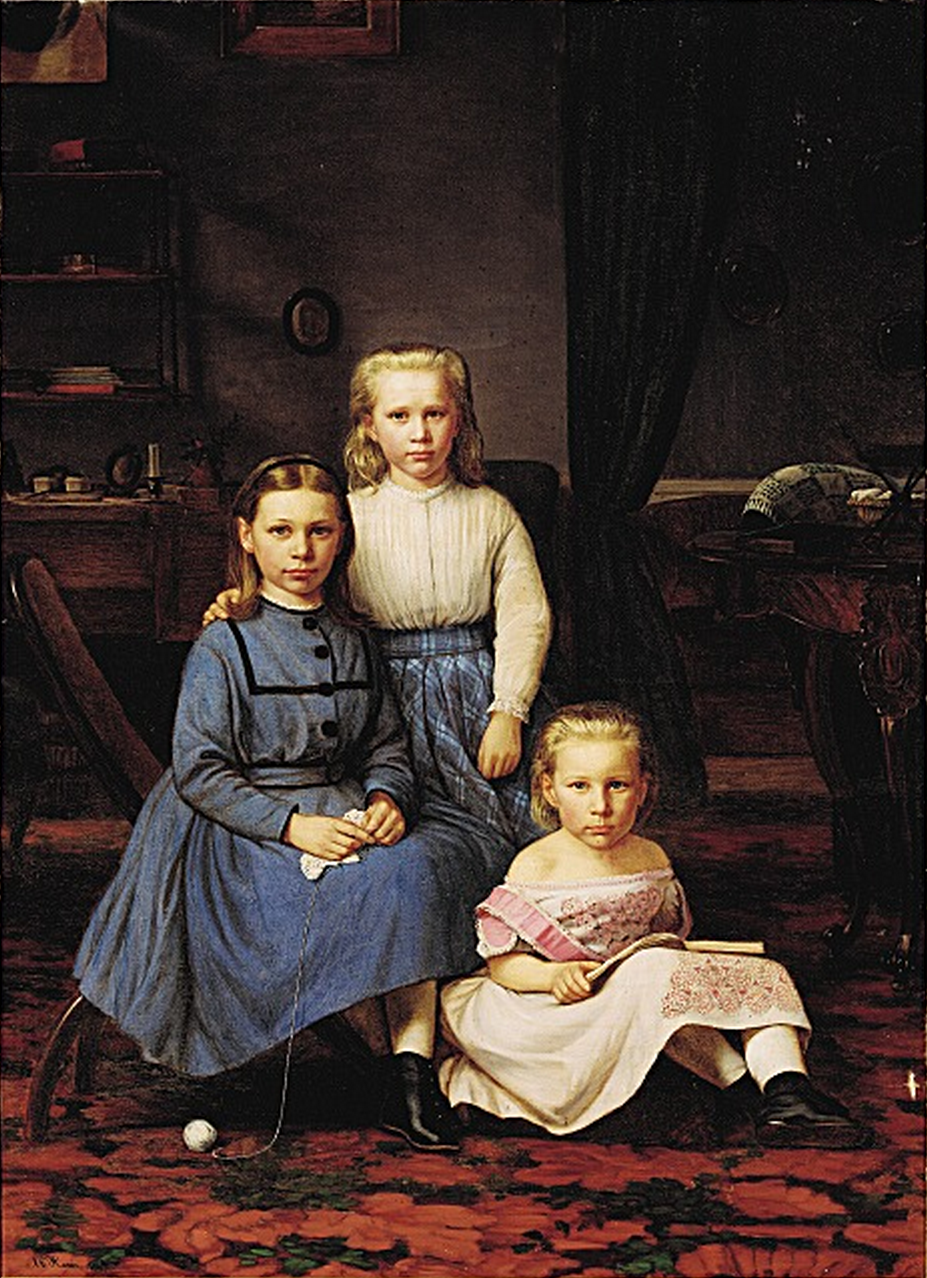
Agnes, Hedevig and Mathilde Ahlefeldt-Laurvigen

Niels Christian Hansen (16 December 1834, Næstved – 25 October 1922, Frederiksberg) was a Danish portrait and genre painter; brother of the pioneering photographer Georg Emil Hansen.

== Early life and education ==
He was the son of Carl Christian Hansen, a pastry chef who became an amateur daguerrotypist.

In 1851, Hansen began to study painting at the Royal Danish Academy of Fine Arts, where he was awarded silver medals in 1956 and 1857. By the time he graduated, his father had opened a small photographic studio (1854), with the help of older brother Georg, but he decided to continue pursuing a career as a painter.

During the 1860s, he made numerous study trips to France and England. In 1865, he was awarded the Neuhausenske Prize for a scene depicting Lieutenant Johan Anker and his heroic actions during the Battle of Dybbøl.

== Career ==
Eventually, he developed an interest in photography and, in 1867, together with Georg and Albert Schou, a retired Lieutenant and clerk, founded the company of Hansen & Schou. Two years later, they took on another partner, the German-born Clemens Weller (a bookbinder), so the firm was renamed Hansen, Schou & Weller. That same year, they received a Royal warrant of appointment as official court photographers. In 1872, they participated in the Nordic Industry and Art Exhibition (Copenhagen) and, in 1875, received a bronze medal at a similar exhibition in Vienna.

Shortly after Schou left, in 1885, the company relocated to a fashionable location in Bredgade. Hansen retired to resume painting in 1889. Initially, perhaps influenced by his experience with photography, he painted in a very detailed naturalistic style. Later, his choice of subjects and styles became more flexible.

== Personal life ==
He never married and was interred at the Garrison Cemetery, Copenhagen.

== Sources ==
- Bjørn Ochsner: Fotografer i og fra Danmark til og med år 1920, Bibliotekscentralen, 1986, ISBN 87-552-1216-6
- Mette Sandbye (Ed.), Dansk Fotografihistorie, Copenhagen: Gyldendal 2004, ISBN 87-00-39586-2
- Kirsten Nannestad, "N.C. Hansen", in: Sys Hartmann (Ed.), Weilbachs Kunstnerleksikon, Copenhagen: Rosinante 1994–2000.
