= Max Kurnik =

German writer and theatre critic

Max Kurnik (1 November 1819 – 8 April 1881) was a German writer and theatre critic.

== Life ==
Born in Zaniemyśl, Kurnik was one of the leading left-liberal journalists in Breslau from around the middle of the 19th century. In 1851, he founded the first telegraph office in Silesia. He worked for the Schlesische Zeitung and later for the Breslauer Zeitung as a theatre and music critic. From 1872, he headed the Schlesische Presse, published by Salo Schottländer. He was close friend with Karl von Holtei.

Alexander Moszkowski reported in his autobiography about Kurnik's apparently rather conservative taste in music:

The famous Leopold Damrosch wielded the baton, and through him we gained a hazy sense of symphonic classicism. These were, however, drowned out by the orchestral adventures that Damrosch brought to the fore as an ultra-progressive composer. He brought the futurisms of Liszt and Berlioz, and when he once unleashed upon us a festive piece of music by Hans von Bronsart, it was considered a foregone conclusion that this tonal terrain was essentially dominated by the devil. We were encouraged in this by our house oracle of the Silesian press, whose main representative, Max Kurnik, had the smell of infallibility. And there we read it in black and white that such festive music would only be appropriate at cannibalistic revelries. Now we were completely justified in our many-handed drumming, which we had called "symphony-making" in a drastic generalisation.

— Alexander Moszkowski, Das Panorama meines Lebens

Kurnik died in Wrocław at the age of 61.

== Work ==
- Gotthold Ephraim Lessing. Ausgewählte Dramen analytisch erläutert. 1845
- Nathan der Weise.
- Goethe's Frauen. In zwei Lieferungen, Joh. Urban Kern, Breslau 1848 and 1849
- Karl von Holtei. Ein Lebensbild, Berlin 1880
- Theater-Erinnerungen, Janke Verlag, Berlin 1882
- Ein Menschenalter Theater-Erinnerungen (1848–1880), Bertrams Print on Demand, ISBN 978-1-149-35952-5
