= Albert Schou =

Danish photographer

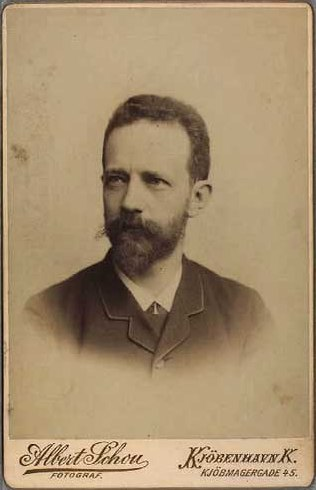
Self photographic portrait

Albert Schou (27 March 1849, ? – 4 February 1900, Copenhagen) was a Danish photographer.

== Biography ==
He was a retired lieutenant, working as a clerk for a bookseller when, in 1867, he joined with the photographer Georg Emil Hansen and his brother, the painter Niels Christian Hansen. Often mistaken as the Schou related to Hansen, Schou & Weller (rightfully Ole Christian Rasmussen Schou)

By 1883, there were already newspaper advertisements promoting him as freelance photographer, with a studio on Holmens Kanal. He left the firm in 1885 and, two years later, opened his own studio, on Købmagergade, which he operated until 1898. Some of his photographs also bear addresses near the Tivoli Gardens and Vesterbrogade.

His son, "Albert Schou jr." (Albert Christian Ludvig Max Schou, 1878–1944) was also a photographer and continued his father's business, having already operated his own studio on Frederiksborggade. In 1893, he had won a silver medal at the World's Columbian Exposition in Chicago.

== Sources ==
- Bjørn Ochsner: "Albert Schou", in: Fotografer i og fra Danmark indtil år 1900, Vol. 2, Det Kongelige Bibliotek, 1996
- Dansk Fotografihistorie, Mette Sandbye (Ed.). Gyldendal, Copenhagen 2004, ISBN 87-00-39586-2
