= Lars Schwander =

- Born: December 15, 1957 (age 68)
- Occupations: Photographer; gallerist; curator; publisher; editor
- Known for: Founder of Fotografisk Center
- Website: www.larsschwander.com

Lars Schwander (born 15 December 1957) is a Danish photographer, and gallerist. As a photographer, he is best known for his portraits of international artists. In 1996, he founded the Fotografisk Center in Copenhagen, an exhibition space for art photography.

== Career ==
Lars Schwander was born in 1957. In the 1980s he was the co-editor of the magazine Sidegaden before founding his own magazine Copyright. He was part of the editorial group of Sidegaden magazine from 1982 to 1984, then a publisher and editor at Lundtofte Publishing in Denmark from 1987 to 1993. From 1989 and in the 1990s, he held a number of roles in the department of photographs at The Royal Library. Schwander was publisher and editor-in-chief of Copyright Art Magazine from 1990 to 1992. He founded the Fotografisk Center in 1996, and was director until 2011. He was curator for photography at the Louisiana Museum of Modern Art from 1999 to 2004, and a board member of The Finnish Cultural Institute in Copenhagen in 2001. He founded the Institute of Photography in 2011. In 1996 Schwander established the Fotografisk Center at Gammel Strand in Copenhagen and in 2008 he opened a second photography gallery, annexone.org in Amaliegade.

Schwander has portrayed many international artists in his photography, including Björk, Leonard Cohen, Annie Leibovitz, Peter Greenaway, Roger Ballen, Günther Förg, Martin Kippenberger, Duane Michals, Helmut Newton, Yoko Ono, Cindy Sherman and Lawrence Weiner. His artistic work is represented in international collections such as those of Bibliothèque Nationale in Paris, the Musée de la photographie in Belgium, the Royal Danish Library inCopenhagen, the Brandts Museum of Photographic Art, Louis Vuitton Foundation in Paris, the Lenono Photo Archive in New York and the extensive German Olbricht Collection in Essen.

He has also written a number of books and catalogues on photography and photographers, including a biography of Viggo Rivad, as well as a reviewer of photography books and exhibitions for national daily Politiken.

Schwander has also curated exhibitions for the Louisiana Museum of Modern Art. and sits on boards and committees of the Danish art world as well as on the jury in the Fogtdal Photographers Award.

== Bibliography ==
- Schwander, Lars (2000). Viggo Rivad, mellem lys og skygge: en biografi (in Danish). Copenhagen: Rhodos. ISBN 9788772458496. OCLC 62146641.
- Schwander, Lars (2001). Portraits of Artists / Portraits d'Artistes / Kunstnerportrætter. Copenhagen: Rhodos. ISBN 9788772458946.
- Schwander, Lars (1994). Subjektivt: Dansk fotografi 1980–1994 (in Danish). Copenhagen: Informations Forlag.
- Schwander, Lars (2012). Shaken Not Stirred - James Bond Portraits. Galleri Mikael Andersen.
- Schwander, Lars (2011). The Art of Photography: Selections from the Fotografisk Center Collection. Fotografisk Center.

== See also ==
- Photography in Denmark
