= Thorvald Bindesbøll Medal =

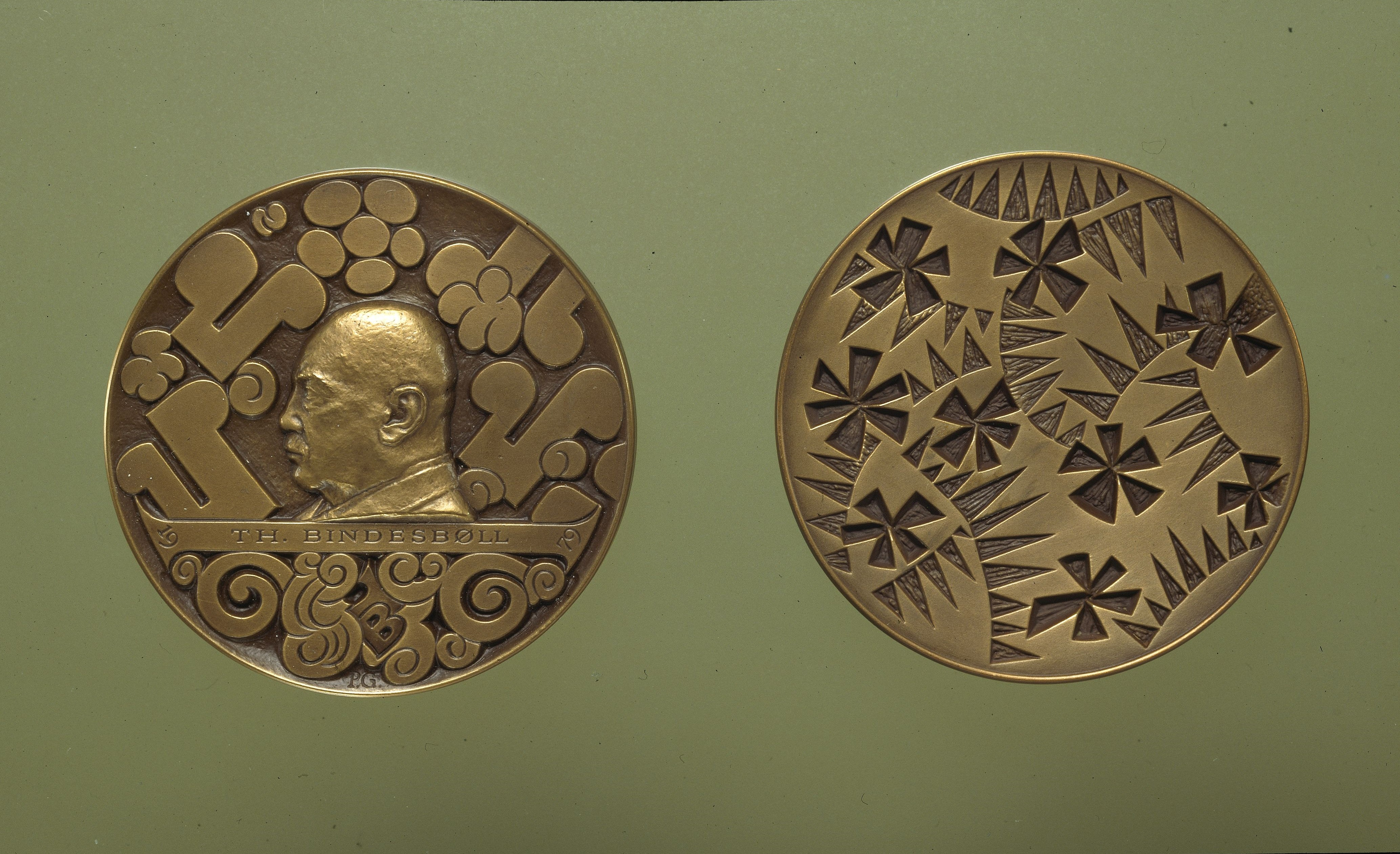
- The Thorvald Bindesbøll Medal
- Sponsored by: Royal Danish Academy of Fine Arts
- Date: 1982; 44 years ago
- Country: Denmark
- Website: http://www.akademiraadet.dk/index.php?id=54

The Thorvald Bindesbøll Medal (Danish: Thorvald Bindesbøll Medaljen) is an award granted annually by the Royal Danish Academy of Fine Arts for excellence in the fields of applied art and industrial design. The medal was established in 1979 in connection with the 75th anniversary of Thorvald Bindesbøll's design of the Carlsberg Pilsner label. Designed by Frode B. Bahnsen on the basis of a model by Paul Gernes, it has been awarded since 1981.

== Recipients ==
=== 1980s ===
Year	Recipient(s)	Field
1981	Keld Helmer-Petersen	Photographer
1981	Gertrud Vasegaard	Ceramist
1982	Kim Naver	Weaver
1983	Arje Griegst	Sculptor
1983	Jacob Jensen	Designer
1983	Grethe Meyer	Architect
1984	Lisa Engquist	Ceramist
1985	TGutte Eriksen	Ceramist
1985	Erik Nyholm	Ceramist
1985	Viggo Rivad	Photographer
1986	TClaus Achton Friis	Architect
1986	Lisbet Munch-Petersen	Ceramist
1987	Not awarded	
1988	Klavs Helweg-Larsen	Architect
1989	Not awardedøø	

=== 1990s ===
Year	Recipient(s)	Field
1990	Not awarded	
1991	Ruth Malinowski	Photographer
1991	Ole Palsby	Designer
1992	Rigmor Mydtskov	Photographer
1993	Myre Vasegaard	Ceramist
10994	Erik Ellegaard Frederiksen	Graphic artist
10994	Austin Grandjean	Graphic artist
10994	Kirsten Klein	Photographer
10994	Ursula Munch-Petersen	Ceramist
1995	Not awarded	
1996	Erik Magnussen	Architect
1996	Per Mollerup	Designer
1996	Ole Søndergaard	Architect
1997	Bente Hansen	Ceramist
1997	Puk Lippmann	Weaver
1998	Jens Lindhe	Photographer
1998	Vibeke Riisberg	Textile designer
1999	Krass Clement	Photographer
1999	Nanna Ditzel	Designer

=== 2000s ===
Year	Recipient(s)	Field	Ref
2000	Jens Møller-Jensen	Architect	Ref
1991	Bodil Manz	Ceramist	Ref
2002	Niels Borch Jensen	Copper printer	Ref
2002	Peter Bramsen	Lithographer	Ref
2002	Peter Johansen	Lithographer	Ref
2003	Michael Jensen	Designer	Ref
2003	Jane Reumert	Ceramist	Ref
2004	Ole Jensen	Designer	Ref
2005	Jette Valeur Gemzøe	Architect	Ref
2006	Not awarded		
2007	Ole Jensen	Designer	Ref
2008	Louise Campbell	Architect	Ref
2009	Flemming Brian Nielsenl	Stonemason	Ref

=== 2010s ===
Year	Recipient(s)	Field	Ref
2010	Esben Lyngsaa Madsen	Ceramist	Ref
2011	Cecilie Manz	Architect	Ref
2011	Ove Rix	Architect	Ref
2012	Kasper Salto	Architect	Ref
2012	Carl-Henrik Kruse Zakrisson	Designer	Ref
2013	Not awarded		
2014	Bo Linnemann	Designer	Ref
2015	Komplot Design (Boris Berlin and Poul Christiansen)	Designers	Ref
2016	Åse Eg	Graphic designer	Ref
2016	Henrik Vibskov	Designer	Ref
2016	Teit Weylandt	Architect	Ref
2017	Cecilie Bendixen	Architect	Ref
2017	Karen Bennicke	Ceramist	Ref
2018	Thomas Poulsen FOS	Artist/designer	Ref
2019	Anne Tophøj	Ceramist	Ref

== See also ==
- List of European art awards
