= Holdt =

Holdt is a surname. Notable people with the surname include:

- Jacob Holdt (born 1947), Danish photographer
- Olivia Holdt (born 2001), Danish footballer
