= Jacob Aue Sobol =

Danish photographer

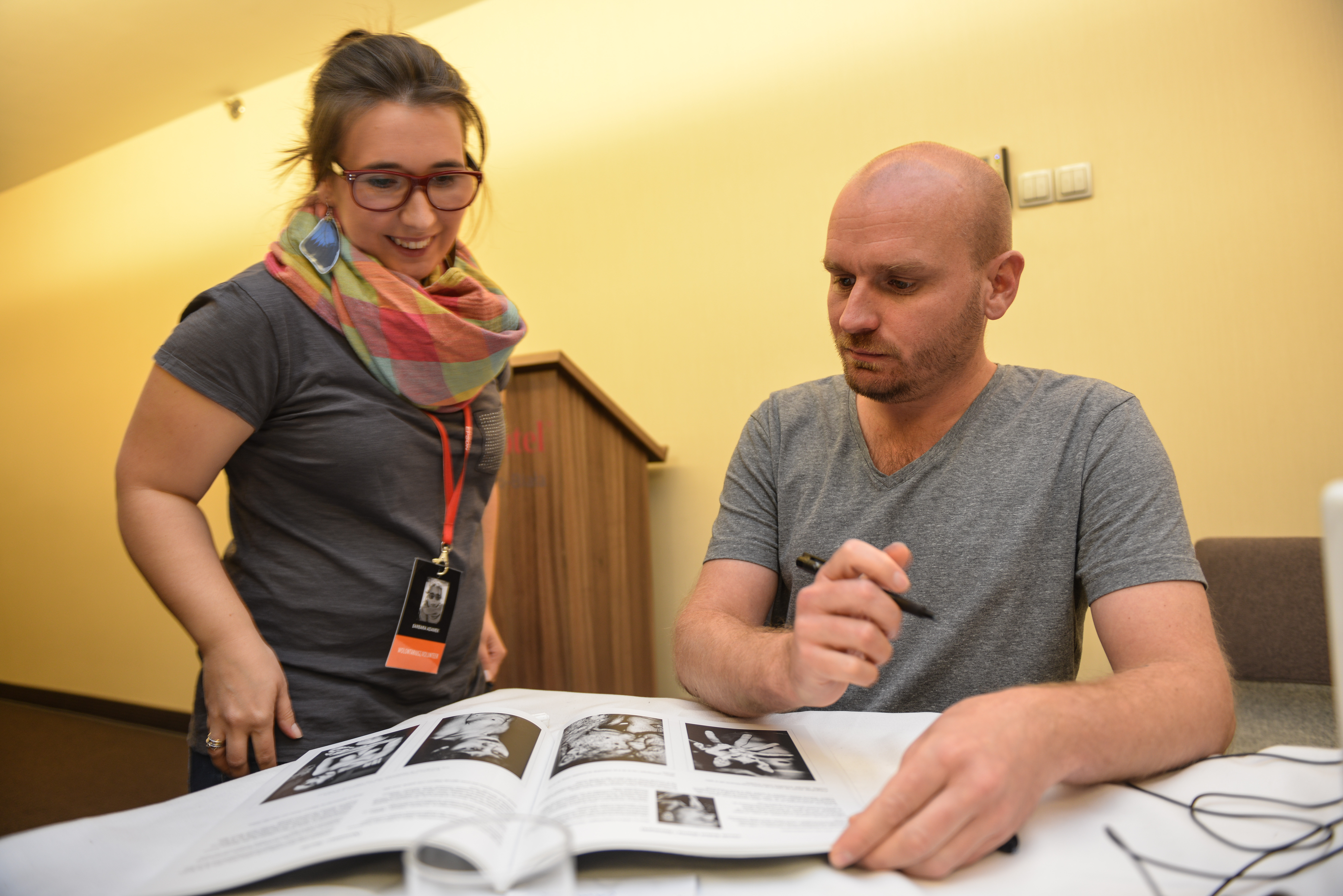
- Sobol during FotoArtFestival, 2013
- Born: 1976 (age 49–50); Copenhagen, Denmark
- Education: European Film College Fatamorgana
- Known for: Photography
- Website: www.jacobauesobol.com

Jacob Aue Sobol (born 1976) is a Danish photographer. He has worked in East Greenland, Guatemala, Tokyo, Bangkok, Copenhagen, United States and Russia. In 2007 Sobol became a nominee at Magnum Photos and a full member in 2012. His work has been published in a number of monographs and many catalogues, and is held in the collection of the San Francisco Museum of Modern Art.

== Early life and education ==
Born in Copenhagen, Sobol lived in Canada from 1994 to 1995. Back in Europe he first studied at the European Film College and from 1998 at Fatamorgana, the Danish School of Art Photography.

== Life and work ==
In the autumn of 1999 he went to the remote East Greenland village of Tiniteqilaaq to photograph. The visit was only supposed to last a few weeks but after meeting a local woman, Sabine, he returned the following year and stayed there for the next two years, living the life of a fisherman and hunter. In 2004 Sobol published Sabine, which in photographs and narrative portrays Sabine and describes his encounter with Greenlandic culture. The pictures in the book express the photographic idiom he developed at Fatamorgana.

In the summer of 2005, Sobol went with a film crew to Guatemala to make a documentary about a young Mayan girl's first trip to the ocean. The following year he returned to the mountains of Guatemala, this time by himself, to stay with an indigenous family for a month to document their everyday life.

In 2006 he moved to Tokyo to spend 18 months photographing the city for his book I, Tokyo. Commenting on the book, Miranda Gavin appreciates how "the sensitivity of his approach shines through the work and sets him apart as one of a new generation of photographers with the ability to allow eroticism and danger to seep through his images without becoming sordid or clichéd."

Sobol became a nominee of Magnum Photos in 2007 and a full member in 2012.

In 2008, Sobol worked in Bangkok where he photographed children fighting for survival in the Sukhumvit slums, despite the country's growing economic prosperity.

In 2009, he moved back to Copenhagen. Since then he has worked on projects at home as well as in America and Russia.

For Arrivals and Departures (2013), Sobol rode the Trans-Siberian Railway over the course of several month-long trips, from Moscow, through Russia, Mongolia, and China. "He stopped in numerous villages along the route, and also visited Ulan Batar, Mongolia, and Beijing. Along the way, he photographed the landscapes he watched out the window, the stark accommodations in which he bedded down, and the people he met".

By the River of Kings (2016) was made over an extensive period spent in Bangkok.

For Road of Bones, Sobol journeyed along the R504 Kolyma Highway in Russia, photographing the frozen landscape and its communities.

== Publications ==
=== Books by Sobol ===
- Sabine. With a text by Sobol and a foreword by Finn Thrane. (Note: Thrane's foreword is reproduced within Sobol's website here)
  - Copenhagen: Politiken, 2004. Danish. Edition of 700 copies.
  - Copenhagen: Politiken, 2004. Greenlandic. Edition of 200 copies.
  - Self-published, 2004. English. Edition of 200 copies.
- I, Tokyo. Actes Sud (France), Apeiron (Greece), Dewi Lewis (UK), Braus (Germany), Lunwerg (Spain), Peliti (Italy), Mets & Schilt (Netherlands), 2008. ISBN 978-1904587682.
- Fortællinger = Stories. Kolofon / Colophone, 2011. Exhibition catalogue. Photographs from the series Sabine, I, Tokyo, Bangkok Encounter and Home.
- Avec Toi. Maison du Danemark, 2013. ISBN 978-2914878302. Exhibition catalogue.
- Arrivals and Departures. Leica Gallery Warsaw, 2013. First edition. Exhibition catalogue.
  - Second edition. Leica Gallery Warsaw, 2015.
- With You. Sienna: La Bottega Galleria, 2015. Exhibition catalogue.
- 12 Months of Winter Issue 1: January: Onse & Axel. Self-published / Brothas, 2016. Edition of 1000 copies.
- 12 Months of Winter Issue 2: February: Marcella. Self-published / Brothas, 2016. Edition of 1000 copies.
- By the River of Kings. Tokyo: Super Labo, 2016. ISBN 978-4905052944.
- With and Without You. Tokyo: Super Labo, 2016. Photographs from his published series Sabine, The Gomez Brito Family, Arrivals and Departures, By the River of Kings, and I, Tokyo as well as from his then unpublished series Home, Road Of Bones and America.
- Road of Bones. 2016. Catalogue format.
- James-ip illua = James' House. Tokyo: Super Labo 2022. ISBN 9784908512605.

=== Publications paired with others ===
- Veins. Stockport, Cheshire: Dewi Lewis, 2013. ISBN 978-1-907893-45-2. With Anders Petersen. With a text by Gerry Badger.

=== Publications with contributions by Sobol ===
- On Daido: An homage by photographers & writers. Kassel: FBF. Photographs by Sobol, Morten Andersen, Nobuyoshi Araki, Machiel Botman, Krass Clement, Antoine D'Agata, JH Engström, Stephen Gill, John Gossage, Todd Hido, Takashi Homma, Osamu Kanemura, Rinko Kawauchi, Keizo Kitajima, Takuma Nakahira, Asako Naharashi, Mika Ninagawa, Katsumi Omori, Koji Onaka, Martin Parr, Anders Petersen, André Principe, Leo Rubinfien, Ken Schles, Joachim Schmid, Oliver Sieber, Alec Soth, Katja Stuke, Aya Takada, Ali Taptik, and Terri Weifenbach. Edition of 500 copies.

== Awards ==
- 2006: World Press Photo Award in the Daily Life Stories category, for the Guatemala series
- 2008: Leica European Publishers Award for Photography for I, Tokyo
- 2009: UNICEF Germany Photo of the Year Awards: Honorable Mention

== Exhibitions ==
- 2003: Tiniteqilaaq – The strait that runs dry at low tide, Odense Phototriennale, Denmark
- 2004: Sabine, Superdanish, Festival of Danish Art, Toronto, Canada
- 2006: Sabine, Open Eye Gallery, Liverpool, UK
- 2007: Sabine, Month of Photography, Kraków, Poland
- 2008: I, Tokyo, Brandts Museum of Photographic Art, Odense, Denmark
- 2009: I, Tokyo, Rencontres d'Arles, Arles, France
- 2013: Arrivals and Departures, Leica Gallery Prague, Czech Republic

== Collections ==
- San Francisco Museum of Modern Art, San Francisco, California: 5 prints (as of 13 May 2023)
