= Fotografisk Center =

Exhibition space in Copenhagen, Denmark

Coordinates: 55.6656°N 12.5346°E

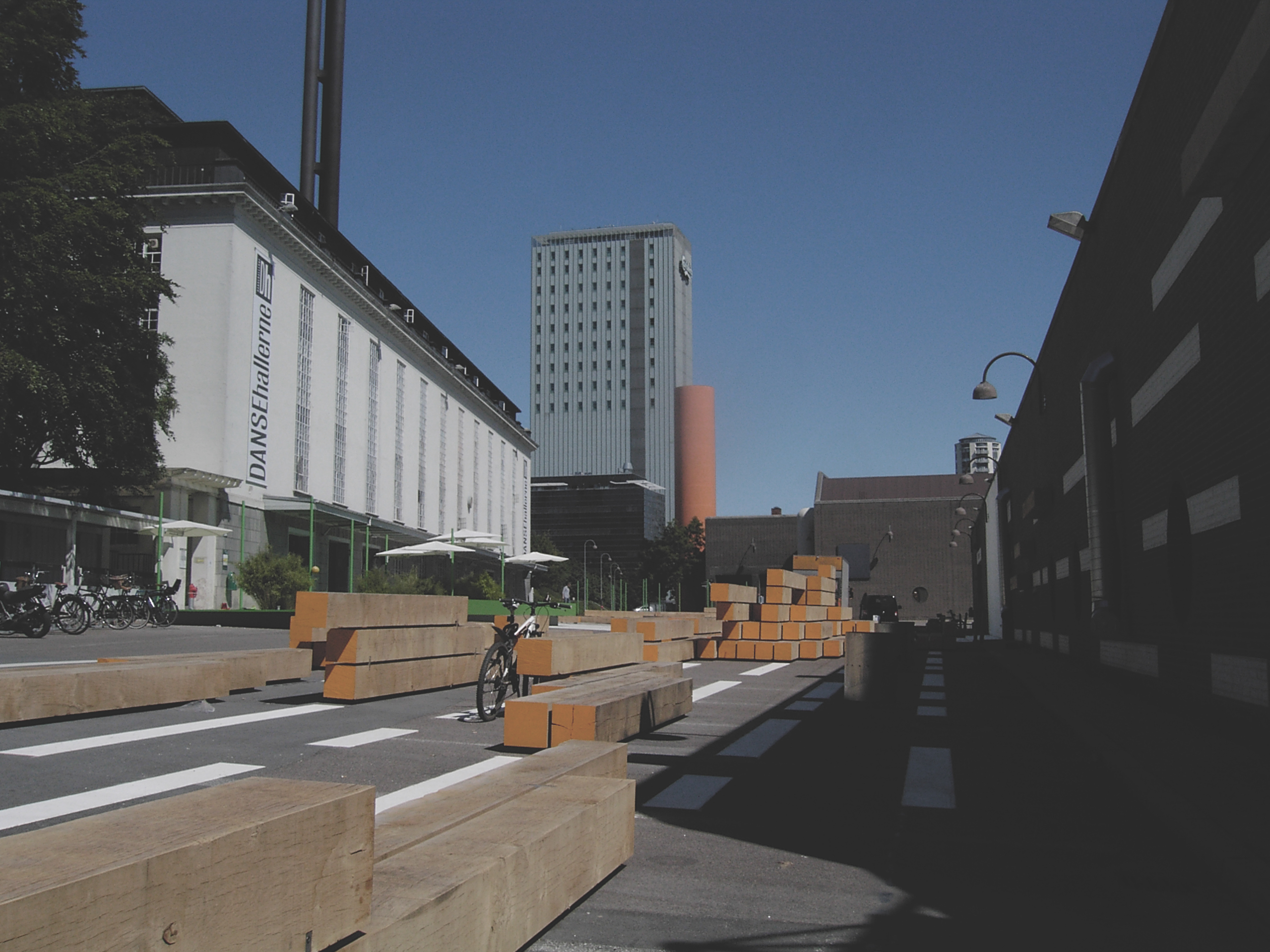
The Tap E building

Fotografisk Center is an exhibition space in Copenhagen, Denmark, dedicated to international and Danish photographic art. Since 1 January 2016 it has been based in the Copenhagen Meat Packing District (Det Brune Kødbyen) at Staldgade 16, 1799 Copenhagen V.

== History ==
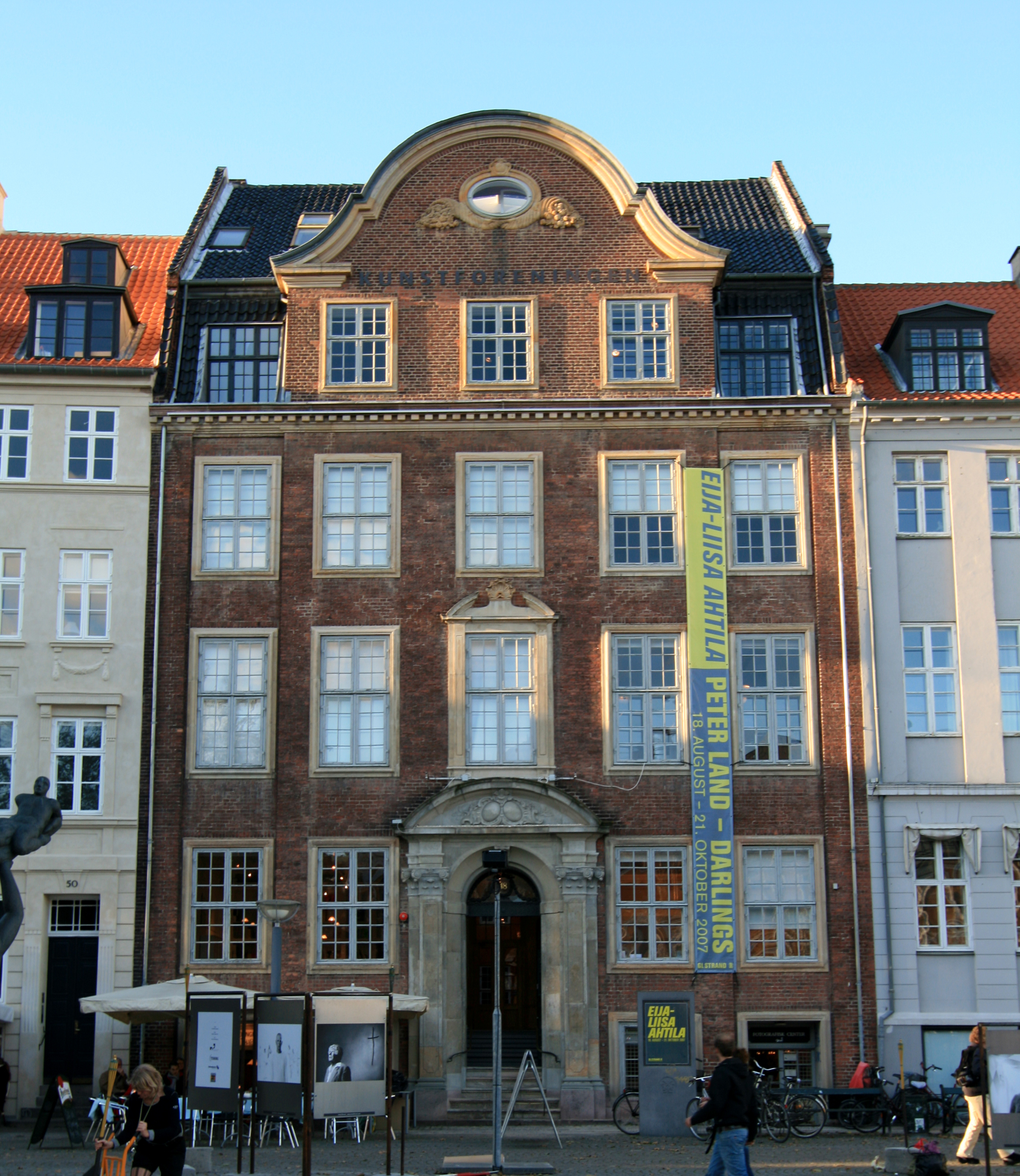
Kunstforeningen's building at Gammel Strand which housed the Fotografisk Center until 2008

The Fotografisk Centre was established in 1996 by the photographer Lars Schwander. It was originally based in the ground floor of Kunstforeningen's building on Gammel Strand When the building closed for a major refurbishment in mid-2008, the centre moved to a temporary address on Amaliegade. Faced with years of disturbance due to the upcoming construction of a station on the new City Circle Line of the Copenhagen Metro, it was decided not to return to Gammel Strand after the renovation but instead to look for new and larger premises. On 1 February 2011 the gallery re-opened in Tap E, a former bottling plant in the Carlsberg area, Carlsberg's which is under redevelopment into a new district and today houses a growing cluster of cultural institutions and businesses.

== Exhibitions ==
A full range of fine art photography is shown, with equal emphasis on both classical and contemporary photography by international artists as well as Danes. An annual exhibition presents the winners of the Fogtdal Photographers Awards.

Over the years, exhibitions have presented the works of Manuel Alvarez Bravo, Gisèle Freund, Alfred Guzzetti, Josef Koudelka, Henri Lartique, Sally Mann, Duane Michals, Inge Morath, Georg Oddner, Yoko Ono, Man Ray, Viggo Rivad, Bruce Gilden and many more.

=== Young Danish Photography ===
The Fotografisk Center's exhibition activities include an annually recurrent exhibition entitled Young Danish Photography, presenting a selection of emerging photographers. The exhibitions are accompanied by the publication of a book which documents the exhibitions.

Year	Photographers
1998	Stine Barr Prebensen, Jacob Fuglsang Mikkelsen, Charlotte Claudia Haslund-Christensen, Tine Hauch-Fausbøll, Rikke Løwenstein
1999	Stine Gøtrik, Susanne Lin Jensen, Søren Lose / Dror Kasinsky, Tine Maria Koefoed
2000	Charlotte Kim Boed, Christina Hebe, Tim Jørgensen, Simon Dybbroe Møller, Rune Pedersen, Trine Søndergaard
2001	No exhibition
2002	Jasper Carlberg, Carina Johnsen, Sara Thiesen, Camilla Holmgren, Jannie Weimar
2003	Jes Holm, Adam Jeppesen, Rosemaria Rex, Ada Bligaard Søby, Ebbe Stub Vittrup
2004	No exhibition
2005	Jakob Hunosøe, Astrid Kruse Jensen, Dorthe Jeppesen Muxoll, Myne Søe-Pedersen
2006	Thomas Bangsted, Anders Find, Anne Lass / Lasse Ernlund Lorentzen
2007	Mette Bersang & Louise Bøgelund Saugmann, Mie Riis Christiansen, Jacob Vinamata Jessen
2008	Lotte Fløe Christensen, Christina Glob, Johan Rosenmunthe, Gina Zacharias
2009	Lisa Marker, Lea Porsager, Alexander Tillegreen, Marianne
2010	Albert Grondahl, Absalon Kirkeby, Helene Koch

== Other facilities ==
The center also includes a well stocked bookstore that specializes in photography. It features major international publications, limited edition artists books as well as many of its own publications.

Fotografisk Center has also established The Digital Room, a well equipped digital darkroom and workshop available to artists.

== Publications ==
The Fotografisk Center publications extend beyond catalogues for its exhibitions with titles such as Among Danish Jews and Marianne Engberg: Photographs, both for the Danish National Museum.

== See also ==
- Photography in Denmark
