= Lithuanian design =

Lithuanian design comprises interior, fashion, industrial and graphic design. The appearance of design usually being related to the industrial revolution. In Lithuania, the state restitution in 1918, National Revival and the rapid growth of Kaunas city were the most important factors. Lithuanian design was influenced by Bauhaus, Lithuanian national patterns and ethnographic elements. Most prominent examples of Lithuanian design are chairs by Jonas Prapuolenis, interiors of buildings in Kaunas in the interbellum period, vacuum cleaner Saturnas.

== Preindustrial era. The Baltic culture and the Grand Duchy of Lithuania. ==
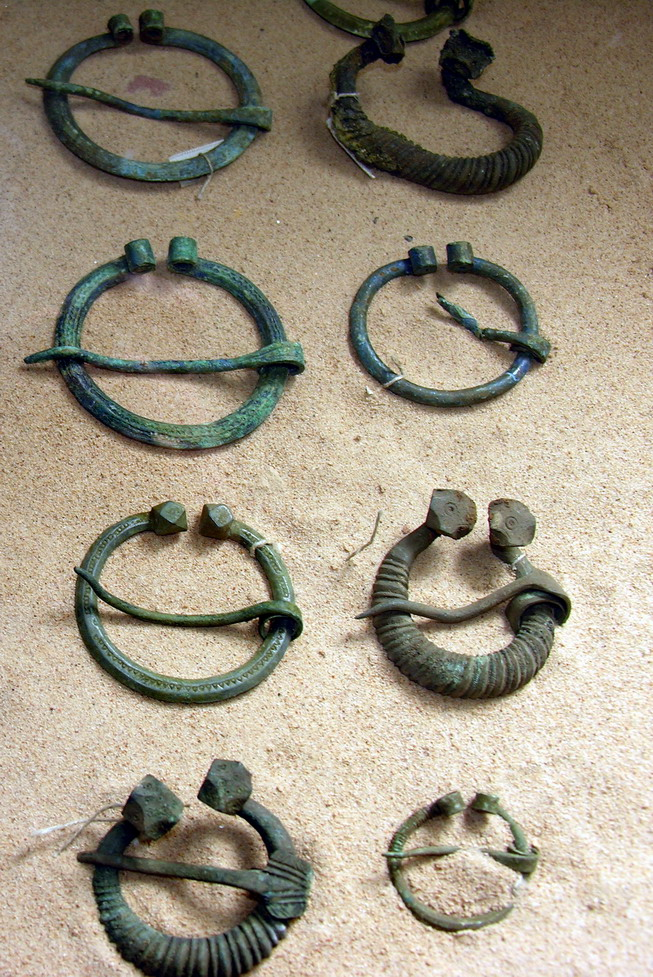
Lithuanian broches, 9th–12th century

One can judge about the oldest Baltic and Lithuanian art looking at the jewelry, made of bronze in ancient and early medieval era. In Kernavė, ancient Lithuanian capital, homesteads of blacksmith and jeweler from 14th century were found. Already in 13th century in Vilnius artisans were working producing shoes only. First artisans from other European countries started to resettle to Lithuania by the invitation of Grand Duke Gediminas. First guild in Vilnius - the guild of goldsmiths was established in 1495. In the 16th century in 40s the goldsmithing was flourishing in Vilnius. In 17th-18th century the Jesuit novitiate of Vilnius was famous for its goldsmith, woodworker, carpenter workshops. In 1737 after the fire destroyed many interiors of Vilnius churches, the jesuit workshops produced seats, commodes, poundings. Kontusz belts, tapestry was weaved in Lithuania, glass foundries were operating. Embroideries of ceremonial clothing were established In monasteries. In 17th century the craftsmen of Vilnius (horologifex) started to make finely designed clocks, most famous were Jakob Gierke, Johannes (Hans) Klassen, Johan Scheirer, Theodor Tarasovig. In 1779 a watchmakers guild was created in Vilnius. In year 1795, 38 various guilds were operating in Vilnius. Palace of the Grand Dukes of Lithuania and manor residences of Radvilos, Goštautai, Sapiega magnates were the main consumers and clients of luxury goods and fine art. Pietro Platina, main master of Vilnius coin mint designed coins during the reign of Stephen Báthory. Antanas Tyzenhauzas was the first creator of manufactures in Lithuania. French masters from Lyon created patterns for his royal silk textile manufacture.

== First Republic. 1918–1940 ==
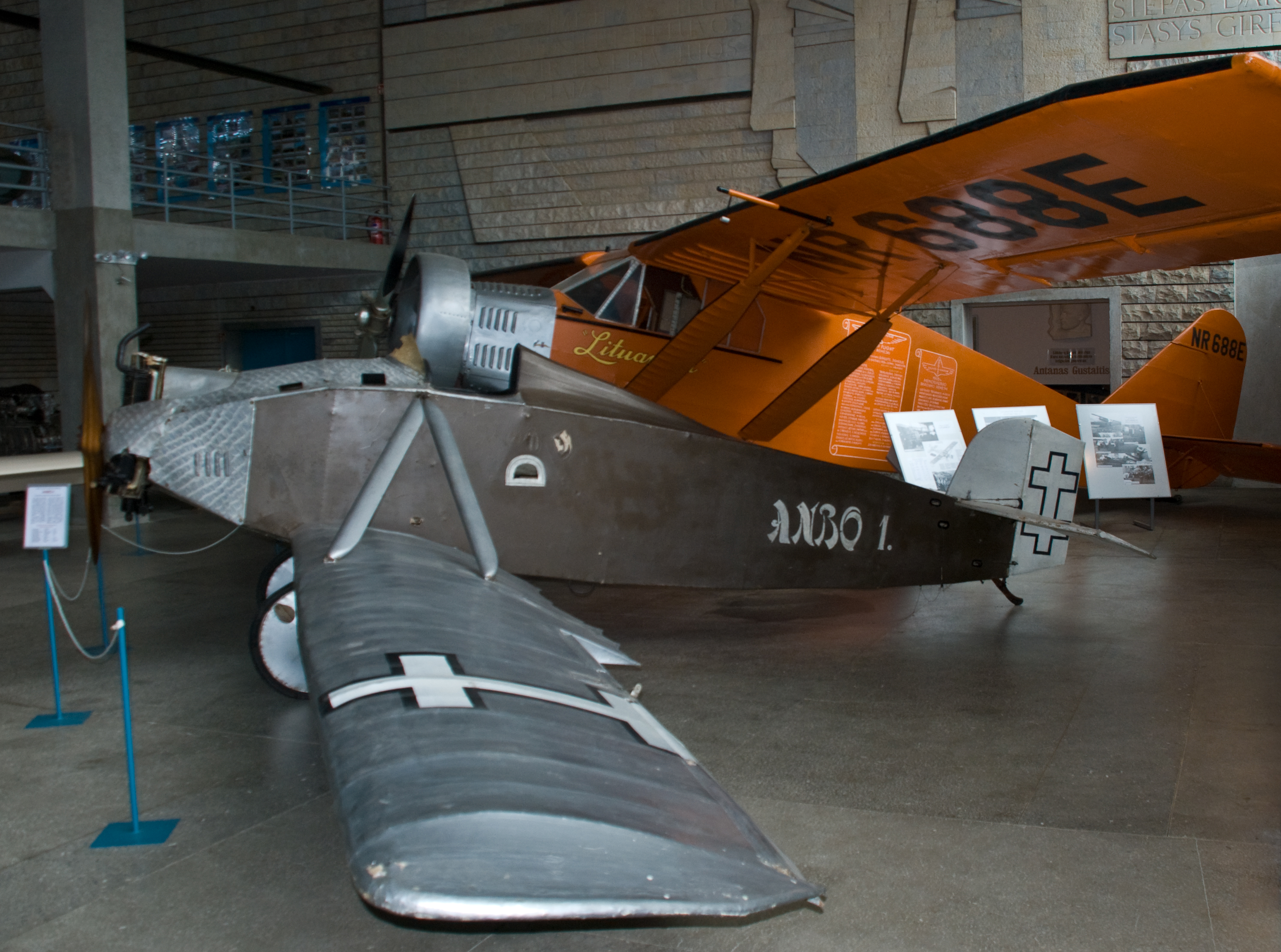
ANBO-I (1925) in Lithuanian Aviation Museum

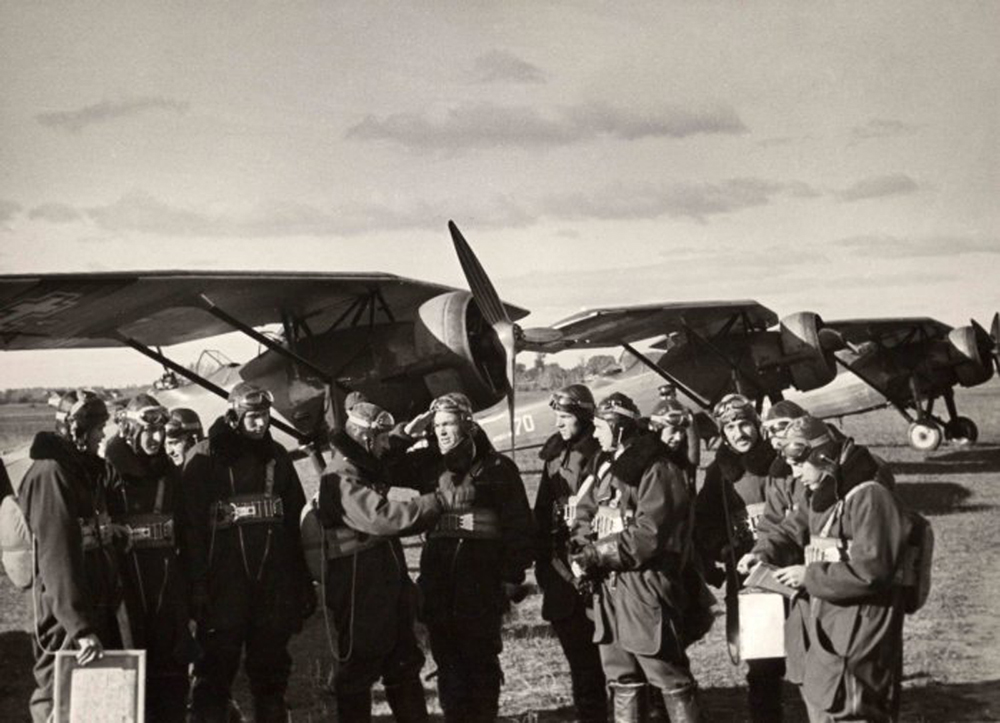
Three ANBO-41s (circa 1938)

After regaining the Independence of Lithuania, the need emerged for architects, engineers and artists. Best students were sent to the universities of Europe. Architects which returned, changed Kaunas unrecognizably; well-off citizens started to live in the new buildings with modern interiors. Kaunas Art School included design into the teaching curriculum - A.Smetona, S.Ušinskas, J.Mikėnas were the professors. Art Deco design dominated in the graphical design, especially in poster design. Aviation engineer Antanas Gustaitis designed ANBO series airplanes which he tested himself. ANBO 41 was then the only aircraft in Europe to employ a wooden three-blade propeller. Furniture creator Jonas Prapuolenis created furniture based on Lithuanian national art. Petras Rimša, V. K. Jonynas were also known as furniture designers.

Selected works:

- Furniture set by Jonas Prapuolenis in Exposition Internationale des Arts et Techniques dans la Vie Moderne in Paris was awarded a Golden medal.

== Period of occupation. 1940–1990 ==
Glider LAK-12, 1979

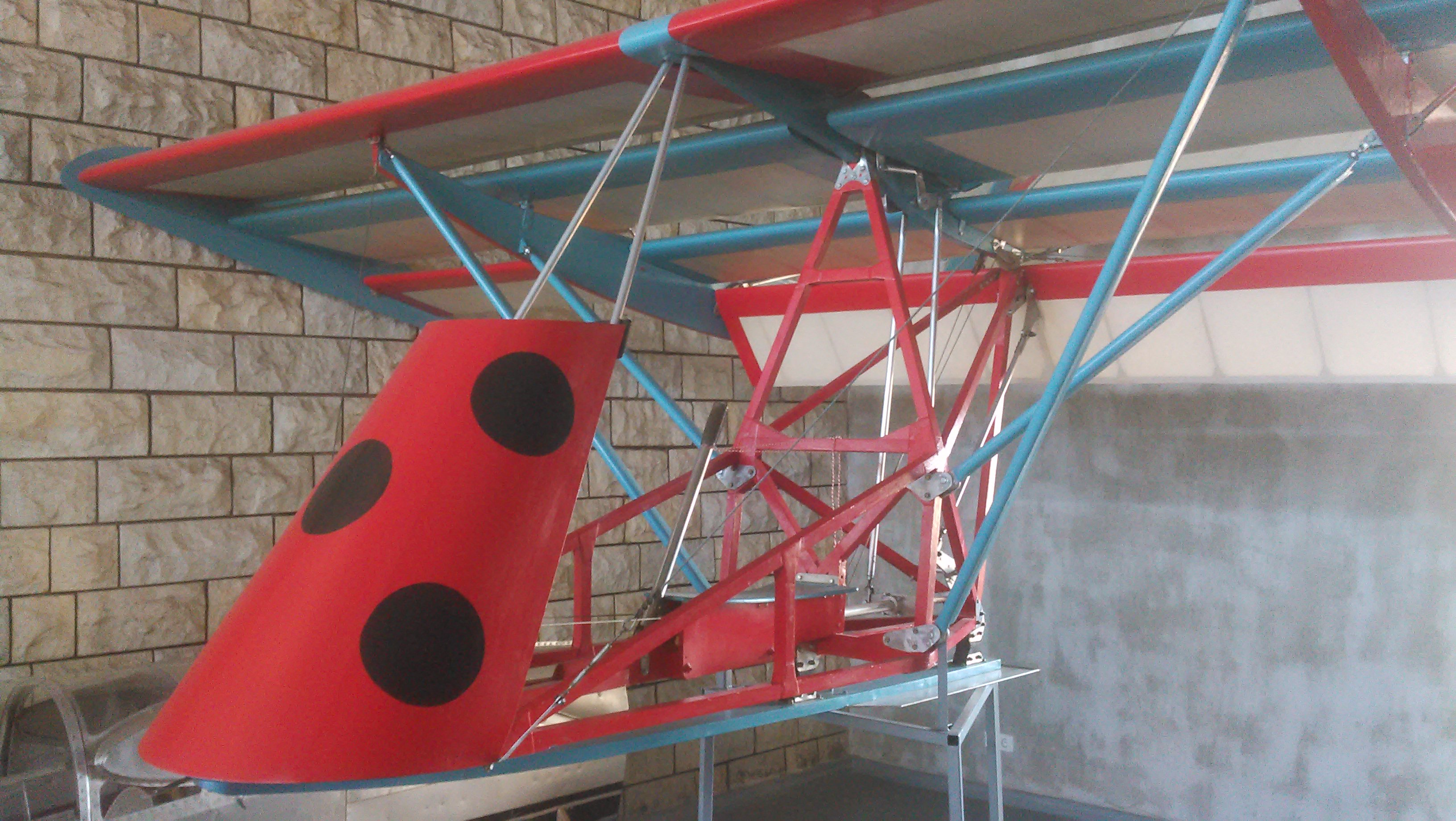
World's smallest glider BrO-18 Boružė (Ladybird), 1975

During the Soviet occupation requirements for the design were mostly ideological and restrictive. Some of the inventions of modernists were adopted and implemented - e.g. ideas of Corbusier's machine for living. Despite the Iron Curtain and censorship, ideas and journals from the West reached the creators in Lithuania.

Projektavimo – konstravimo biuras (The Office of Design and Construction) in 1957, Eksperimentinis meninio konstravimo biuras (The Office of Experimental Design and Construction) in 1964 were established in Vilnius. Designers were prepared since 1961 in the Department of Design, which was established at Vilnius Academy of Arts. Feliksas Daukantas (1915-1995) is considered a pioneer of design studies in Lithuania. He established Pramonės gaminių meninio konstravimo katedra (The Department of Artistic Construction of Industrial Products) in Vilnius Academy of Arts and created a teaching program, based on Bauhaus. Design objects were created by artists as well. Sculptor Teodoras Valaitis created a wall of biomorphs for world exhibition Expo-70 in Osaka, which remained unrealized. Algimantas Stoškus created a spatial stained glass project for exhibition of Lithuanian design in London in 1968.

Creators of design contended with the West. According to architect and designer Tadas Baginskas, who created the Architecture of Lithuanian Pavilion for 1968 Earls Court Exhibition Centre in London: “We always contended with the West - we were studying Scandinavian, Italian, Japanese design. Occupants were not an authority for us. And the most pleasant - all noticed our direction in the London exhibition. The exposition (of Lithuanian pavilion) perfectly fitted into the context.”

Most prominent and known design piece of that era is vacuum cleaner Saturnas - created by designer Vytautas Didžiulis, engineers A. Laužadis, A. Šapiro. Spherical parts of Saturnas were used to make light pendants in Lithuanian Composers' Union palace, and sculptor Teodoras Valaitis constructed a decorative wall in the restaurant in Vilnius.

Selected works:

- In 1962 vacuum cleaner Saturnas was created. It was produced in Vilnius Electric Welding Plant.
- In 1979 gliders LAK-12 and experimental LAK-12E were created
- In 1973 mini TV set Šilelis was started to produce

== Second Republic. Since 1990 ==
After restoration of the Republic of Lithuania in 1990, censorship disappeared, and communication with the design world was reestablished. Way of life, and style in day-to-day life became increasingly important - interiors were refurbished and changed, new fashion styles were followed. Fashion design became more important. New sorts of design appeared, such as electronic graphic design.

Per Mollerup, Danish researcher of design, made a study of the possibilities of Lithuanian design, "Design in Lithuania - guaranty of concurrent advantage". One of its conclusions is that there are more trained designers working in Lithuania than in other Baltic countries. Creators of graphic design united in the Lithuanian Association of Graphic Design. The Lithuanian design review Design index is published yearly. Digital design overlaps the borders of graphic design; the software for picture editing and its innovative design Pixelmator were created. Laisvės kodas 13 (The Code of Freedom 13) allows users to experience the Soviet aggression of January 13 in a virtual environment.

Selected works:

- Chair KU-DIR-KA
- Sitting furniture SOSS
- Design of NOKIA C7
- Scooter Pigeon
- Spring-summer 2017 collection by Juozas Statkevičius
- Electric motor for the bicycle Rubee
- Phonograph Reed Muse 3C
- Guitar Lava
- Tonearm Reed 3P
- Echolot Deeper
- River reaction ferry Uperis
- Electric bus Dancer
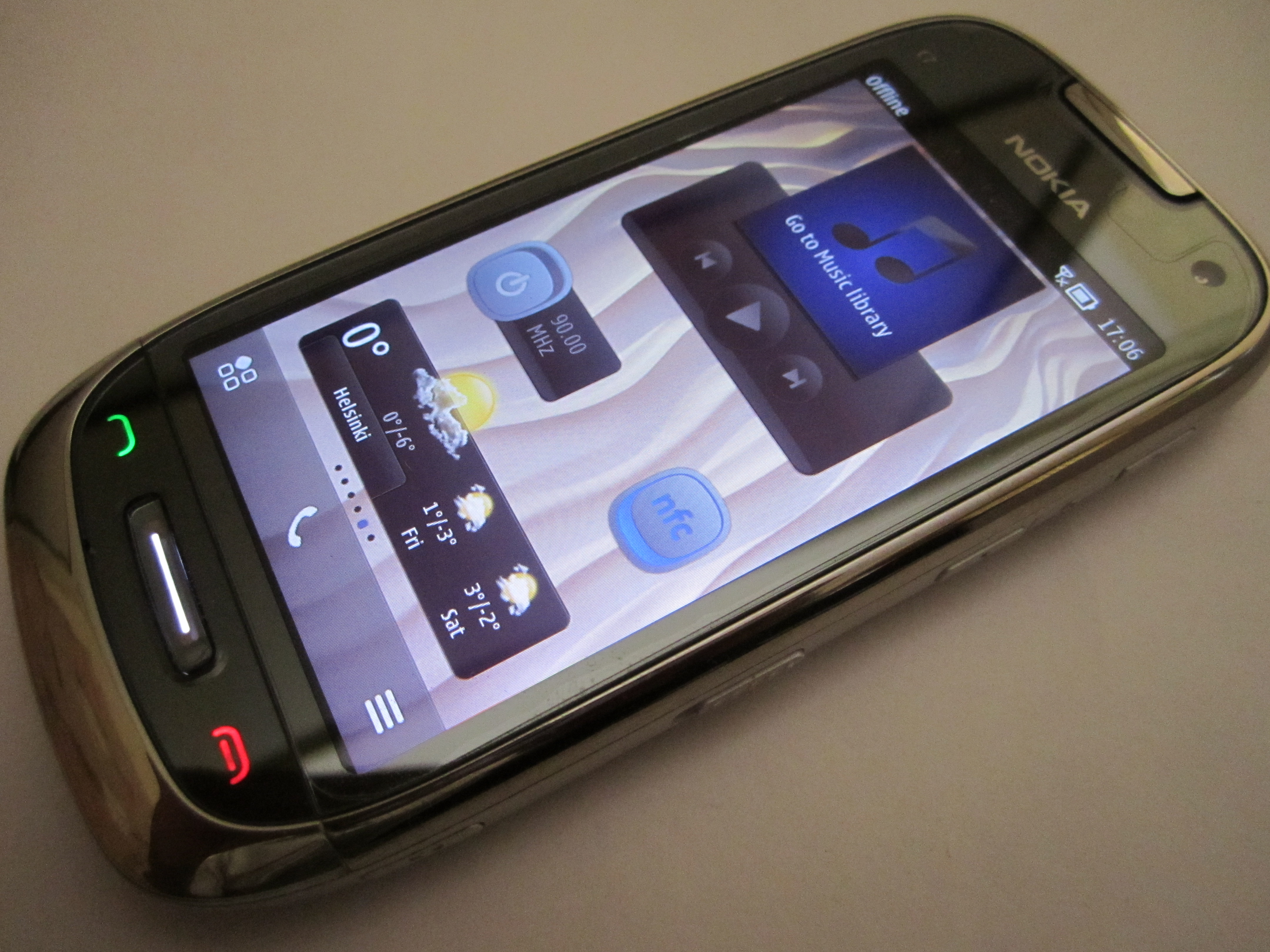
Nokia C7 case design, 2010

== Bibliography ==
- (In Lithuanian) Karolina Jakaitė. Šaltojo karo kapsulė: lietuvių dizainas Londone 1968 / The Capsule of Cold War: Lithuanian design in London 1968. Lapas, Vilnius: 2019. ISBN 978-609-8198-21-8
