= Haslund =

Haslund may refer to:

- Charlotte Haslund-Christensen (born 1963), Danish lens-based visual artist
- Ebba Haslund (1917–2009), Norwegian novelist, writer, radio speaker and politician
- Henning Haslund-Christensen (1896–1948), Danish travel writer and anthropologist
- Margit Haslund (1885–1963), Norwegian women's advocate and local politician
- Nini Haslund Gleditsch (1908–1996), Norwegian political activist and advocate for peace
- Otto Haslund (1842–1917), Danish painter
- Veslemøy Haslund (1939–2005), Norwegian actress and stage producer
