= Morten Bo =

Danish photographer

Morten Bo (born 10 May 1945, Copenhagen), is a Danish photographer who specializes in documentary work with a social impact. His 15 travelling exhibitions in the 1970s and 1980s stirred up controversy. In the 1980s, he turned to abstract photography with lines, contours and contrasts of light and shade. A member of Delta-Photos from 1967 to 1972, in 1973, he was a co-founder of the Ragnarok group. In line with his interest in promoting the art, he founded Fatamorgana, Denmark's school of art photography, in 1989.

== Early career ==
Morten Bo started out in film rather than still photography at the National Film School of Denmark in 1966. He had previously studied architecture and had used photography as a tool to appreciate the concept of space.

== Still photography ==
There was a distinct change to documentary photography in the 1960s when it began to take the form of series or photo essays. Morten Bo followed the trend, representing the interests of the newly formed party, Venstresocialisterne, which had been founded in 1967. His direct approach, inspired by William Klein's street photography, resulted in a considerable number of photo books, quite an innovation at the time.

In 1969, he published his first book Findes der en ridder i orange?. Published in duplex, which was unusual, it presented the dismal street life of Copenhagen with the story of a woman walking through the town. Concern with negative aspects of life was new to photographic publications leading others to follow with works critical of the politics of the day and the Vietnam War.

Next came Blågård Blues in 1971, revealing stark contrasts in the city's street life with nuns presented side-by-side with drug addicts. In 1972, thanks to grants he received from the Arts Foundation and from the National Bank, he was able to travel around Denmark for a whole year. In addition to the travelling exhibition På landet, he published Spor — et folk og en fotograf i 1970erne (Footsteps — a people and a photographer in the 1970s) (1972) with essays entitled Sildefiletfabrikken (Herring filetting plant) or Ud i det fri (Out in the wilds), often concentrating on the ugly or indifferent side of life, including the socially disadvantaged classes.

Bo continued to publish books about life in Denmark whether in the provinces or at the workplace or even, as in Lyset slukkes kl. 22 (Lights out at 10 pm) (1975) among the mentally ill. In 1978, he published Alarm depicting life at a fire station. Folkets skole came out in 1980, criticizing the country's State schools.

His latest experimental book, Røde Missiler (2007) with photographs he took up to 1990, uses a new photographic technique which, in the words of Morten Bo, "made it possible to treat the photographic paper emulsion in a hitherto unseen, expressive, dynamic way. The technique gave me new possibilities to portray the unreal." The pictures combine photography's precise definition with the spontaneous dynamics of art.

For a time, Bo and his contemporaries were at a loss to decide whether they belonged to the world of the press or to that of art. Only in 1978 when Bo presented his artistically executed photographs at the Sophienholm exhibition aptly titled Fotografi for kunst, kunst for fotografi (Photography for Art, Art for Photography) did his choice become apparent. Morten Bo has had a significant impact on photography in Denmark not only through his co-founding of Ragnarok in 1983 but especially as head of the Fatamorgana school of art photography.

In 2008, Morten Bo won the Fogtdal Photographers Award.

== Books by Morten Bo ==
- Findes der en ridder i orange? (with fictional text by Knud Holten), Lund & Jakobsen (1969)
- Blågårds blues (with commentary by Carl Frederik Garde), Bøhms bogtryk (1971)
- Spor — et folk og en fotograf i 1970erne (1972)
- På landet (with commentary by Erik Aalbæk Jensen), Lindhardt & Ringhof (1973)
- I lampen (with Jørgen Borg), (with commentary by Ole Sarvig), Arena (1974)
- Lyset slukkes kl. 22:00, Det danske Forlag (1975)
- Alarm, Informations Forlag (1978)
- Kalkværket, A/S N. Olaf Møller, (1978)
- Folkets skole, Albatros (1980)
- Solen i skyggen, Nyt Nordisk Forlag (1982)
- Aalborg, face to face", (with Per Folkver), Aalborg kommune (1985)
- Danmark på hjul, Scania Danmark (1986)
- Elskede Olga! - en skabelsesberetning, Forlaget Fatamorgana (2007)
- Røde Missiler, Forlaget Fatamorgana (2007)
