= Komplot Design =

- Industry: Design company
- Founded: 1987
- Founder: Poul Christiansen; Boris Berlin
- Headquarters: Copenhagen, Denmark
- Website: https://www.komplot.dk/

Komplot Design is a design studio based in Copenhagen, Denmark. It was founded in 1987 by Danish architect Poul Christiansen and Russian-born designer Boris Berlin. The company works within the fields of industrial, graphic and furniture design.

== History ==
Poul Christiansen (born 1947) graduated as an architect from the Danish Academy of Fine Arts in 1973. From 1969, he worked as a freelance designer, designing for companies like Danish lamp manufacturer Le Klint and Herman Miller.

Boris Berlin (born 1953) was born and educated as an industrial designer in Saint Petersburg, then working with the design of optical instruments and aerospace equipment before moving to Denmark in 1983. From 1984-87, he worked as a product and graphic designer.

Poul Christiansen and Boris Berlin founded Komplot Design in 1987.

== Work ==
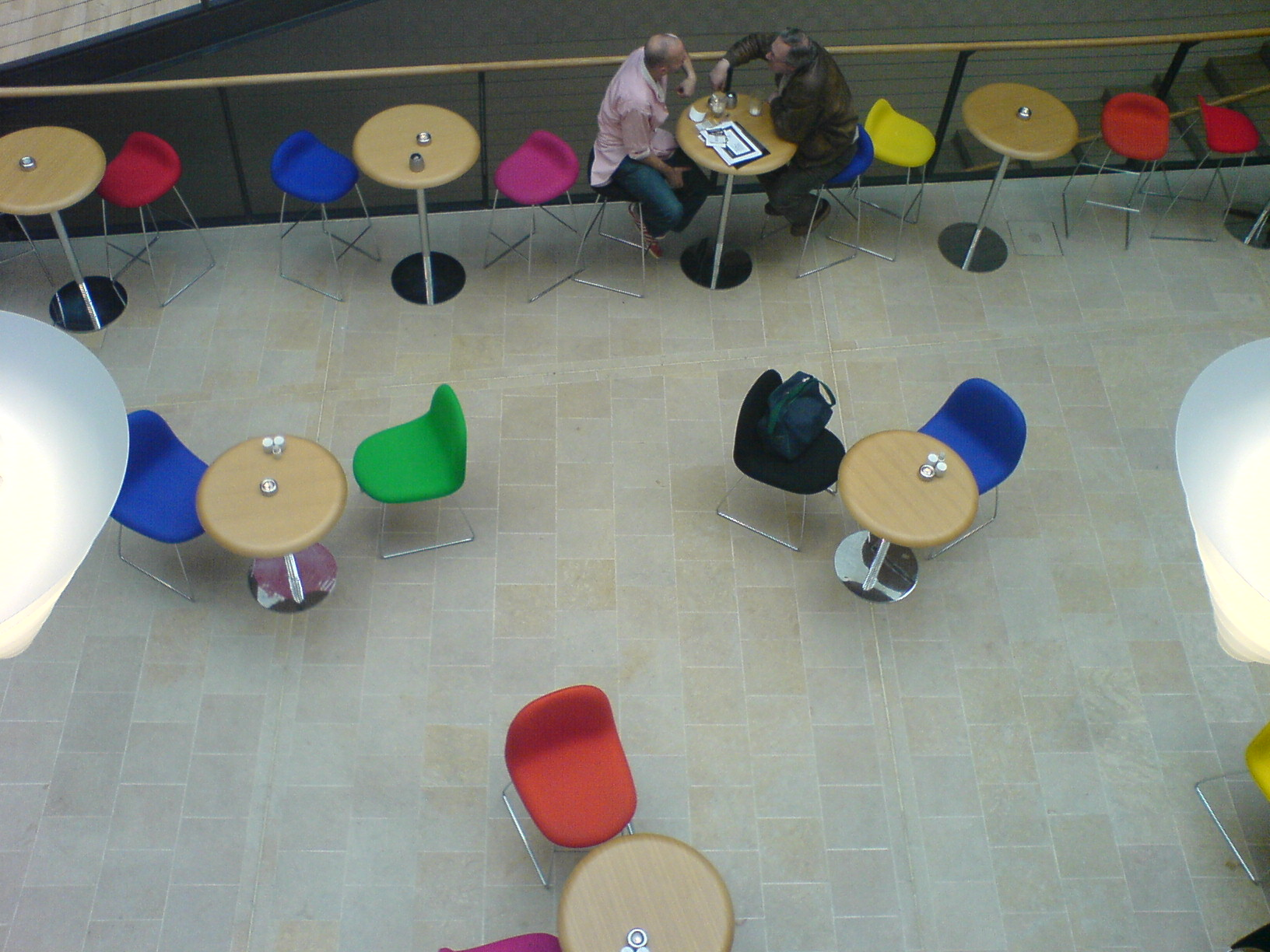
Gubi chairs at the café of the Danish Design Centre in Copenhagen

Komplot Design has developed products for a large number of clients and manufacturers such as Hay, Gubi, Norman Copenhagen, Lightyears, Fora Form and Nola Industrier.

The Museum of Modern Art in New York City has chosen to use both Komplot Design's Gubi chair and their rubber chair Non in the interior design of the Yoshio Taniguchi-designed extension of the museum, including the Gubi chair being the chair used in the restaurant. The Gubi chair is also displayed in the permanent exhibition of the museum.

== Awards ==
- 1989 1st Prize IBD Competition, Table category (for Collage Tables), USA
- 1989 Merket for God Design, Norwegian Design Council (for "Collage" tables), NO
- 1991 Scandinavian Furniture Award (for Vision), DK
- 1991 Top Denmark Award (for "Terre Vita")(together with Stuart Clyens), DK
- 1991 G-Mark Award,(for Collage Tables), Japan
- 1992 Merket for God Design, Norwegian Design Council (for "Vision"), NO
- 1993 Danish National Art Foundation Prize (for Antilope chair), DK
- 1996 2nd Prize in Forsnäs Nordic Design Competition (for "Folio" chair), SE
- 1996 "Rum Pris" (for the best showroom design on Copenhagen Trade Mart), DK
- 2000 'Classics' Award, Norwegian Design Council for Collage Tables, NO
- 2000 "Utmärkt Svensk Form" (for "Longo" seating system), SE
- 2001 Merket for God Design, Norwegian Design Council (for "Viva" chairs), NO
- 2001 Nomination for Danish Design Award (for "Non" chair), DK
- 2001 "Utmärkt Svensk Form" Honorable mention (for "Non" chair), SE
- 2001 Bo Bedre, Årets Designpris (for “NON” chair), DK
- 2002 Sköna hem, Årets Möbel, (for “NON” chair), SE
- 2002 The Furniture Award “Møbelprisen 2002”, DK
- 2003 "Rum Pris" (for the best showroom design on Copenhagen Trade Mart), DK
- 2003 Architectural Review award (for product) excellence, at Spectrum, London (for Genus chair), UK
- 2003 Merket for God Design, Norwegian Design Council (for "Convent" collection), NO
- 2003 Gold Award, Best of NeoCon (for Genus chair), USA
- 2003 Innovation Award, Best of NeoCon Chicago Firniture Fair (for Gubi chair), USA
- 2003 100% Design / Blueprint Award, Best Product (for Gubi chair), UK
- 2003 Le Prix de la Fonctionnalité, Paris (for Genus chair), FR
- 2003 Design 100, Metropolitan Home (for Non chair, "Cleverest use of rubber since the eraser"), USA
- 2003 Bo Bedre, Årets Møbelpris (for "Gubi" chair), DK
- 2004 1st Prize for The Best Design Item in Latvian Furniture Fair, for Python chair, LV
- 2004 Danish Design Prize for "Gubi" chair, DK
- 2004 Red dot design award (for Gubi chair), DE Ger
- 2004 Forsnäs Prize (for Gubi chair), SE
- 2005 1st Prize for The Best New Export Products of Latvia 2005 for Python chair, LV
- 2006 Formland Spring Award (for Pot for One Flower), DK
- 2006 Silver Award, Best of NeoCon (for "Avo" chair), USA
- 2006 Danish National Art Foundation’s Prize (for the exhibition “Forty Chairs in Four Feet”), DK
- 2007 Best of the Best of Red dot design awards winner,(for GUBI Chair II), DE
- 2007 1st Prize in International Composites Design Competition, BE
- 2007 Crafts and Design Biennial Prize for "NOBODY" chair, DK
- 2008 2008 Forum AID Award (for NOBODY Chair), SE
- 2008 “NOBODY” nominated to: Best in International Design Over Last 12 Months, London Design Museum, UK
- 2010 Merket for God Design, Norwegian Design Council (for "Clip" tables), NO
- 2011 Design Award of Federal Republic of Germany (for "NOBODY & Little NOBODY" chairs), DE
- 2015. Bindesbøl medaljen
