= Feliksas Daukantas =

Lithuanian fashion designer (1915–1995)

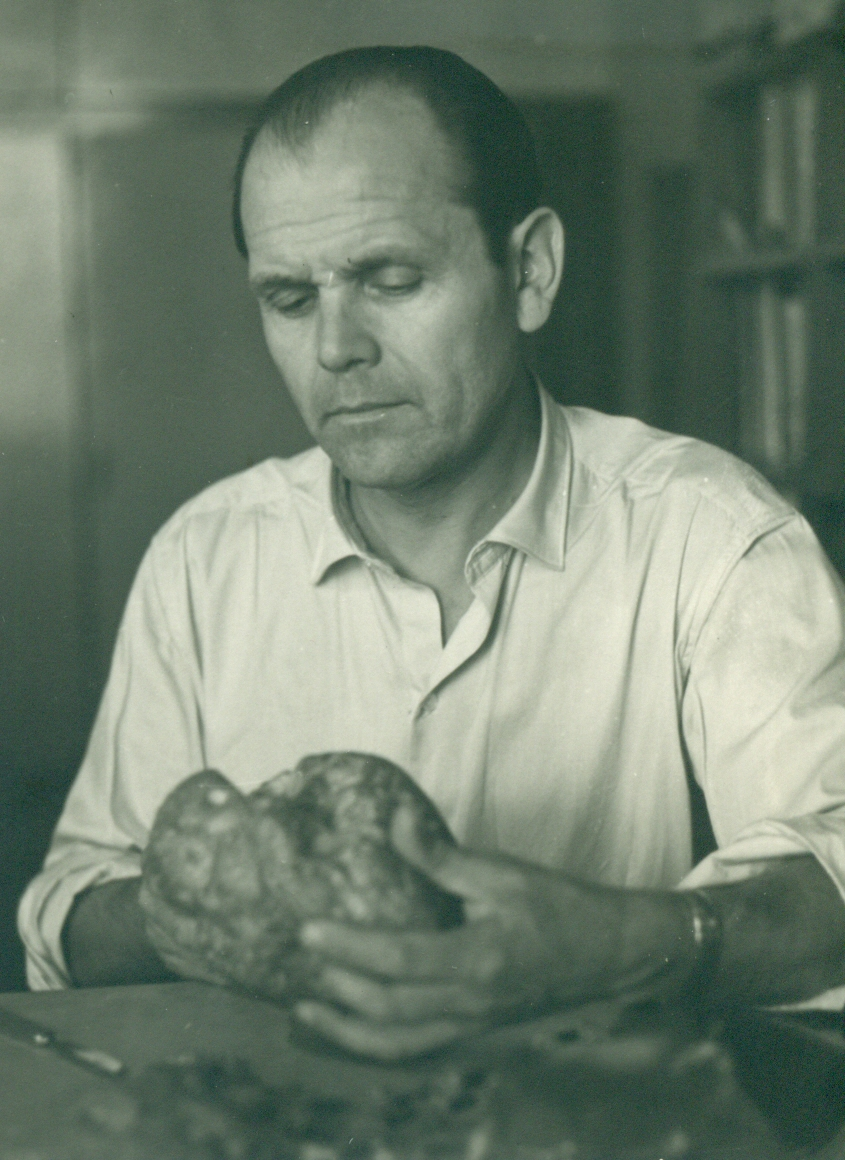
- Daukantas holding amber
- Born: 6 February 1915; Cicero, Illinois, United States
- Died: 12 August 1995 (aged 80); Vilnius, Lithuania
- Education: Vilnius Academy of Arts
- Occupations: Jewellery designer; Professor

Feliksas Daukantas (6 February 1915 in Cicero, Illinois – 12 August 1995 in Vilnius, Lithuania) was an American-born Lithuanian jeweller, designer, and pioneer of design specialty in Lithuania.

Daukantas developed a methodological framework for design particularity; he always cared for the dissemination of Lithuanian design achievements in the press. Daukantas made contributions to Lithuania's jewellery culture, including amber jewellery, which is commonly marketed in the country.

== Biography ==
In 1947, he gained a specialty in sculpture at the Vilnius Academy of Arts and turned to other fields of creativity that had come into contact with the plasticity of sculpture and creation of form.

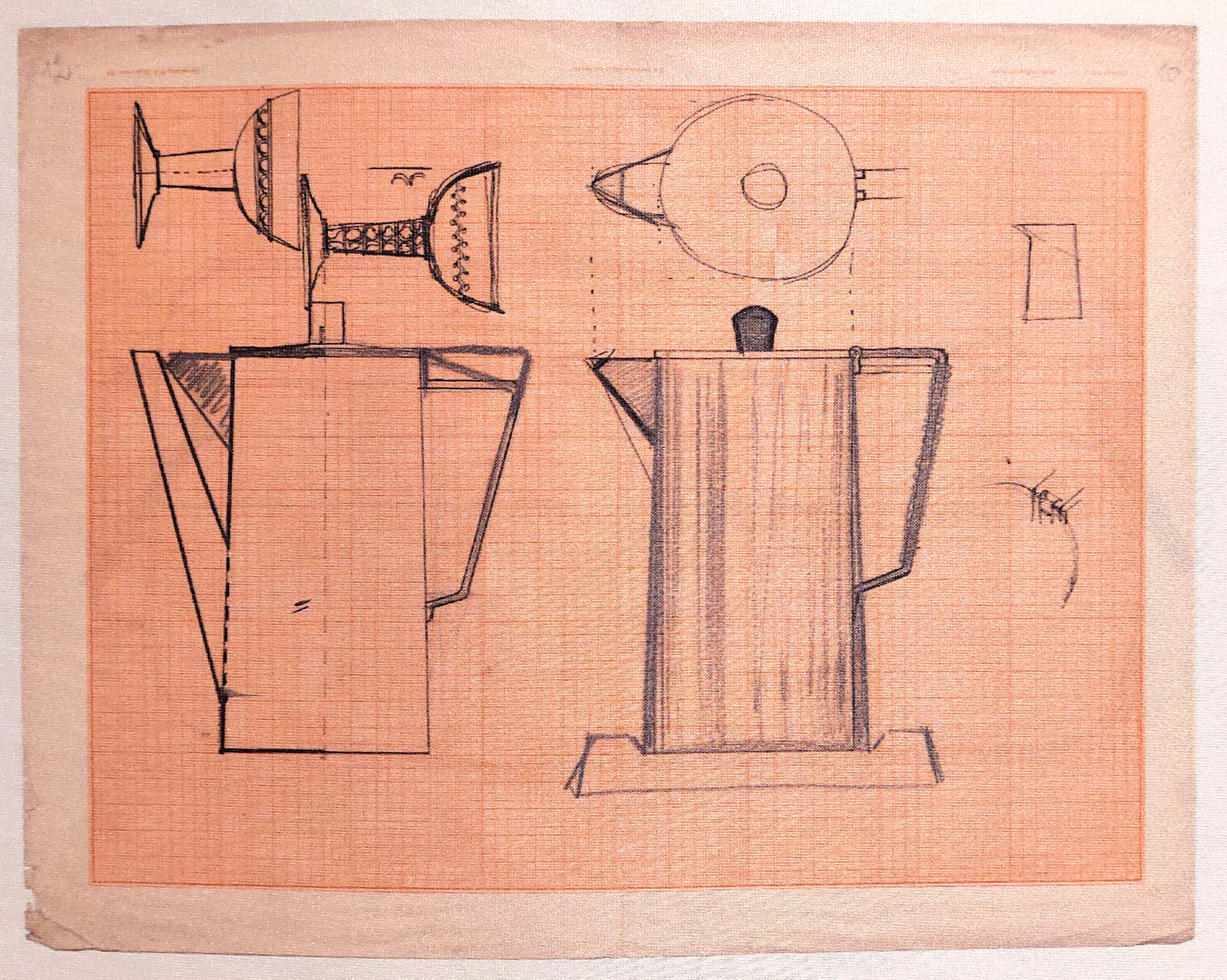
1965 sketch of a coffee pot by Daukantas at the Vilnius Academy of Arts.

In 1949–1961, he worked at Dailė, a factory in Vilnius. Daukantas made original amber jewellery, worked in the fields of industrial graphics and visual communication, created sculptures, wood and metal ware, leather samplers (standards) for mass production, and toys. While being engaged in the practical artistic work, he started incubating an idea about training of professional developers of material environment, specialists of industrial design, with which in 1961 he came to the Vilnius Academy of Arts, where in the same year he founded the Department of Design at the Academy of Arts, became its lecturer and supervisor (until 1985); since 1979, he's worked as a professor.

In 1987, the department was renamed the "Design Department". Daukantas himself organized the material base of the department, brought together academics, drafted study plans; he was the first in the country to form a concept of a design specialist, formerly known as a designer of industrially manufactured items and material environment (the first graduates of this specialty were named as industrial products’ arts design artists) and set the place of design discipline among other disciplines and a designer's position in society.

Since 1950, Daukantas participated in art exhibitions, where he usually exhibited amber articles. Individual exhibitions were held in Palanga (1974 and 1995) and Vilnius (1975 and 1995). For the Vilnius Central Post Office, he designed the system for operational visual symbols (in 1969). He was the creator of covers for periodicals Žemės ūkis (transl. Agriculture) and Statyba ir architektūra (transl. Construction and Architecture); he published articles on industrial art and the aesthetics of the home environment.

== See also ==
- Lithuanian design
- List of Lithuanian painters
