= Keld Helmer-Petersen =

Keld Helmer-Petersen (23 August 1920 – 6 March 2013) was a Danish photographer who achieved widespread international recognition in the 1940s and 1950s for his abstract colour photographs.

== Early years ==
Helmer-Petersen was born and grew up in the Østerbro quarter of Copenhagen. He started taking photographs in 1938, when he received a Leica camera as a graduation present. At an early stage, he became aware of the trends in international photography; in the 1940s he subscribed to the US Camera Annual and in this period became familiar with German inter-war photography, which had developed at the Bauhaus and in the Neue Sachlichkeit (The New Objectivity) movement.

The international prospect and an interest in contemporary art and architecture contributed to the fact that at the age of 23, Helmer-Petersen, as one of the first Danish photographers, began to work with an abstract formal language. Inspired by the Bauhaus and Albert Renger-Patzsch, he published in 1948, the bilingual book 122 Farvefotografier/122 Colour Photographs. This was an audacious début by an autodidactic photographer who wanted to assert the position of photography as an independent art form. Today, the book is considered to be a pioneering work in the area of colour photography.

Nine of his photographs were featured in the 28 November 1949 issue of LIFE.

== Career ==
The pioneering effort with 122 Colour Photographs brought Helmer-Petersen a grant from the Denmark–America Foundation to study at the Institute of Design in Chicago (founded by László Moholy-Nagy in 1937 under the name New Bauhaus). During his stay at the school, he both taught and studied under (among others) the American photographer Harry Callahan. Helmer-Petersen began to experiment with the contrast in graphic black and white expression influenced by constructivist artists and their fascination with industry’s machines and architecture’s constructions. A selection of the photographs that Helmer-Petersen created in Chicago was published in the little book Fragments of a City (1960). This offers a portrait of the city in thirty-five tightly composed graphic images and is a radical example of Helmer-Petersen’s graphic and formal experimentation.

Helmer-Petersen’s approach to photography was by and large experimental and explorative. Again and again, he worked on the borders of what we normally consider to be photography. Among other things, throughout his career he worked with “cameraless” photography, the photogram (a darkroom technique in which objects are placed directly on light-sensitive photographic paper). His curiosity about pushing the limits of the media was expressed in several experimental short films, including Copenhagen Boogie from 1949.

From the 1970s, Helmer-Petersen was preoccupied with the figurative potential in found objects. Like Irving Penn (and at the same time), Helmer-Petersen walked sidewalks, head down, making discoveries among the windswept and downtrodden street refuse. This resulted in works such as the series Deformationer. From 1974 to 1993, he created a large series of close-up abstract colour photographs of walls, timber stacks, etc. A selection of these was published in the book Danish Beauty, in 2004.

In the early 2000s, Helmer-Petersen was rediscovered when 122 Colour Photographs was presented in volume one of Martin Parr and Gerry Badger’s three-volume survey of the most notable photobooks: The Photobook: A History. In the wake of this rediscovery, there followed several exhibitions and a renewed international interest in his work. In 2007, Helmer-Petersen published an extensive retrospective monograph, which presents a broad sample of work from his lengthy career.

In his last works, Helmer-Petersen experimented with the potential of digital technology. In so doing, he returned to the black and white graphic expression that he had cultivated in the 1950s and 1960s. From 2008 up until his death, he placed a variety of old negatives and found objects; refuse, insects, wires, etc., on a flatbed scanner in order to treat them digitally (with the help of the photographer Jens Frederiksen). This process resulted in the experimental trilogy: Black Noise (2010), Back to Black (2011) and the posthumously published Black Light (2014).

== The architect's photographer ==
Architecture and design played a great role in Helmer-Petersen’s work, both professionally and as an artistic field of interest. From 1952 to 1956, he worked with photographer Erik Hansen, after which he established his own studio specializing in architecture and design photography, in 1956. In the decades that followed, he worked as a photographer for his generation of architects and designers, including Finn Juhl, Jørgen Bo, Jørn Utzon and Poul Kjærholm. With the latter, Helmer-Petersen developed a close, long-standing collaboration. He photographed all of Kjærholm’s furniture and together they created the exhibition Strukturer, which was shown in Ole Palsby’s showroom in 1965. In addition, Kjærholm designed Helmer-Petersen’s first solo exhibition: Experiment + Documentation in 1954, at Charlottenborg in Copenhagen.

From 1964 to 1990, Helmer-Petersen was also a senior lecturer at the Royal Academy’s School of Architecture, Institute of Visual Communication. He also served as guest teacher at Den Grafiske Højskole (1960–1963), he was periodically employed at the Skolen for Brugskunst. as well as the Konstvetenskapliga Institut at Lund University in the 1970s. He served as Censor for the Charlottenborg Spring Exhibition in 1977–1978. He sat on the board of directors for the Charlottenborg Autumn Exhibition from 1979 to 1981 and was chairman of the board for the Museum of Photographic Arts, 1984–1993.

== Travels ==
International travel and the exploration of foreign cultures played a central role in Helmer-Petersen's life. His travels also offered a source of inspiration for his work. During a stay in the USA in 1950/1951 he travelled around the country as a photographer for Life magazine. In 1957, he made a round–the–world journey that took him through the USA, Mexico, Japan, China, as well as India, and in 1975 he made a longer trip to Iran. In 1980, he was again in the USA. In addition, he made a great number of shorter trips in Europe.

== Personal life ==
Helmer-Petersen was the son of department head (later counsellor of legation) Kai Helmer-Petersen and Estred Charlotte Andersen. He was married to the television/theatre director Birthe Adelsteen Dalsgaard. Together they had two sons, Jan and Finn. Today, Jan Helmer-Petersen manages and promotes Helmer-Petersen’s work after his death. Helmer-Petersen’s archives were donated to the Royal Danish Library, which has digitized and provided public access to a major part of his negatives and transparencies. Helmer-Petersen is buried at Garrison Cemetery, Copenhagen.

== Publications ==
- 122 Farvefotografier/122 Colour Photographs, Copenhagen: Det Schønbergske Forlag, 1948.
- Colour Before the Camera, London: Fountain, 1952.
- Fragments of the City, Copenhagen: Hans Reitzel, 1960.
- Frameworks, Photographs 1950–1990, Copenhagen: Hans Reitzel, 1993. ISBN 87-412-3242-9.
- Danish Beauty, Copenhagen: Edition Bløndal, 2004.
- Keld Helmer-Petersen: Photographs 1941–1995, Copenhagen: Christian Ejlers Publishers, 2007. ISBN 978-87-7241-282-5.
- Black Noise, London: Rocket Gallery, 2010.
- Back to Black, London: Rocket Gallery, 2011.
- 122 Colour Photographs, New York, Errata Editions (Books on Books 14), 2012. ISBN 9781935004271.
- Black Light, London: Rocket Gallery, 2014.
- Keld Helmer-Petersen, Photographs 1941-2013, Copenhagen, Strandberg Publishing, 2019, ISBN 978-8793604-54-4.

== Short films ==
- Copenhagen Boogie (b/w experimental film), Copenhagen 1949.
- Chicago Motion Light Study (b/w experimental film), Chicago 1950.
- Designer + Industrial Society (b/w documentary film with Jiri Kolaja), Chicago 1951.
- Rødt og Hvidt (Red and White) (promotion film in colour), Copenhagen 1968.
- Falling Water(experimental film in colour), Copenhagen 1971.

== Awards ==
- 1981: Thorvald Bindesbøll Medaljen
- 1996: Nationalbankens Jubilæumsfonds Hæderslegat
- 2005: Fogtdal Photographers Award, Denmark
- 2011: Forening for Boghåndværks Hæderspris

== Exhibitions ==
- 1953–1954: Post-War European Photography, Museum of Modern Art, New York
- 1954–1955: Subjektive Fotografie II, Institution, Saarbrücken, Saarland, Germany
- 1954: Experiment + Documentation, Royal Danish Academy of Fine Arts, Copenhagen
- 1958–1959: Photographs from the Museum Collection, Museum of Modern Art, New York
- 1965: Strukturer, Ole Palsby, Copenhagen
- 1990: Fotografier af Keld Helmer-Petersen, Museet for Fotokunst, Odense, Denmark
- 2004: Retrospektivt (Retrospective), Fotografisk Center, Copenhagen
- 2005: De tidlige år (The Early Years), Fotografisk Center, Copenhagen
- 2005: Rencontres d'Arles (group show), Arles, France
- 2005–2006: Keld Helmer-Petersen, Rocket Gallery, London
- 2007–2008: Winter Graphics/Photographs, Rocket Gallery, London
- 2009: Keld Helmer-Petersen, Galleri Weinberger, Copenhagen
- 2012: Back to Black, Rocket Gallery, London
- 2014–2015: Augen Auf! – 100 Jahre Leica Fotografie (group show), Deichtorhallen, Hamburg, Germany
- 2014: Keld Helmer-Petersen, Yossi Milo Gallery, New York
- 2014: Un autre monde, Danish House in Paris, Paris
- 2015: Keld Helmer-Petersen, Photography and the Photobook, The Library, Aarhus School of Architecture, Aarhus, Copenhagen. Part of Photobook Week Aarhus 2015.
- 2019-2020: Finding Beauty, The National Museum of Photography, The Royal Library, Copenhagen

== Bibliography ==
- Jonge, Ingrid Fischer: “Introduction” in Frameworks, Photographs 1950–1990, Hans Reitzel, Copenhagen, 1993.
- Koetzle, Hans-Michael: Augen Auf! 100 Jahre Leica Fotografie, Kehrer, Heidelberg, 2014.
- Koetzle, Hans-Michael: Photographers A–Z, Taschen, Cologne, 2011.
- Parr, Martin and Gerry Badger: The Photobook: A History, vol. I, Phaidon, London, 2004.
- Poulsen, Tage: ”Mennesker og Mønstre” with Sandbye, Mette (ed.): Dansk Fotografihistorie, Gyldendal, København, 2004.
- Sandbye, Mette: “Colour Cool” in 122 Colour Photographs, (Books on Books 14), Errata Editions, New York, 2012.

== Collections ==
Helmer-Petersen's work is held in the following permanent public collection:

- Museum of Modern Art, New York: 1 print

== See also ==
- Photography in Denmark
- History of photography
