= Le Klint =

Danish light furniture company

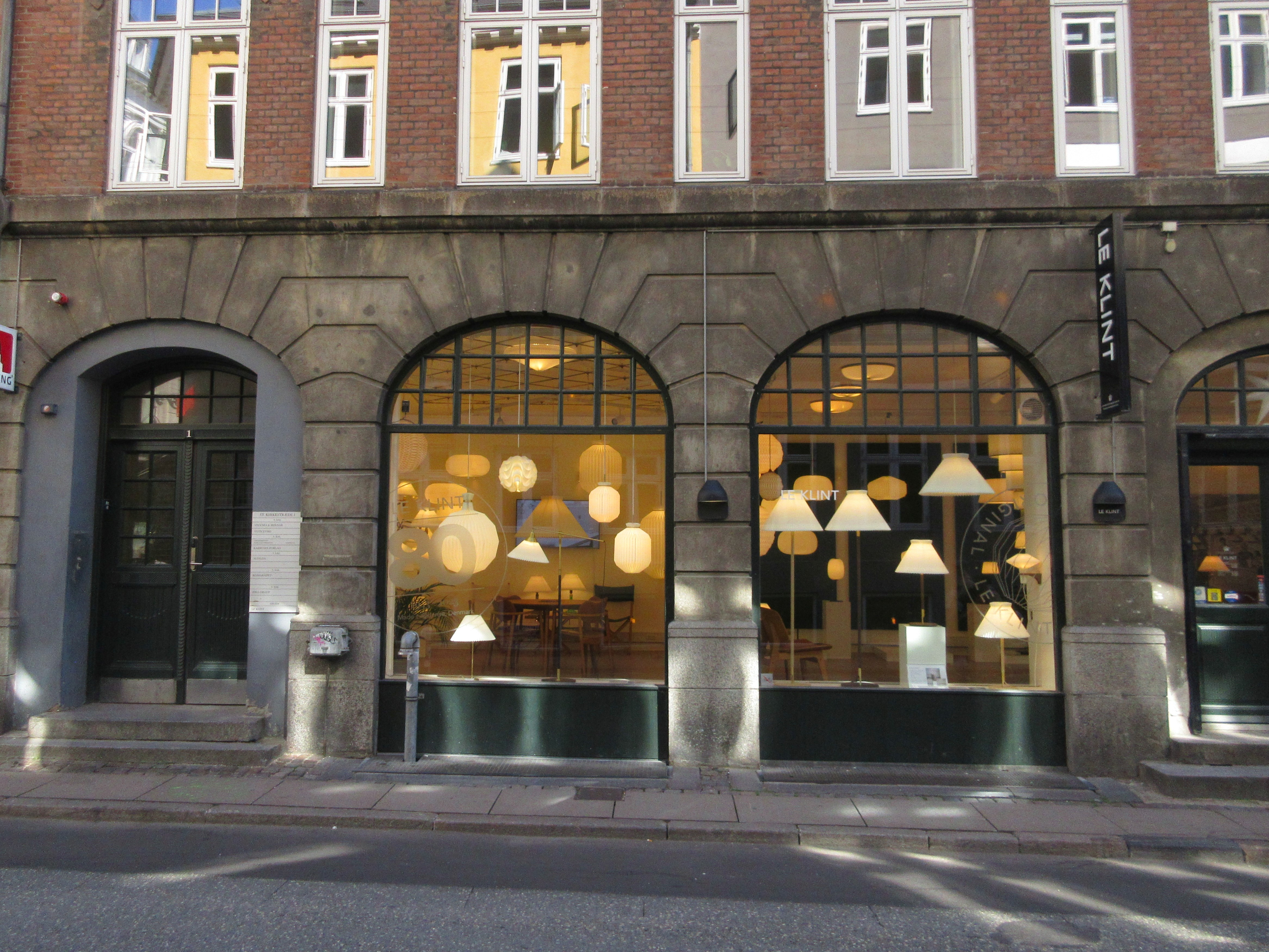
Le Klint shop in Store Kirkestræde in Copenhagen.

Le Klint is a Danish light furniture company known for its lamp shades made out of pleated and folded paper.

== History ==
The design was originally created by the architect Peder Vilhelm Jensen-Klint in about 1900 for his own use. Unlike previous models of pleated lampshades it had a collar which kept it in place without the use of string. Jensen-Klint's son Tage Klint patented the invention in 1938 but it took another five years before the company was founded and a production began. Tage Klint named the company after his daughter Lise Le Charlotte Klint, who also took part in the production.

Tages Klint's brother, Kaare Klint and his son Esben Klint (1915–69) designed a large number of lamps and shades but other designers were also engaged in the design.

Poul Christiansen made new designs for Le Klint from 1967 to 1978, including the successful Sinus line created by combining sine waves which, when folded, form spherical lampshades.

== Image gallery ==
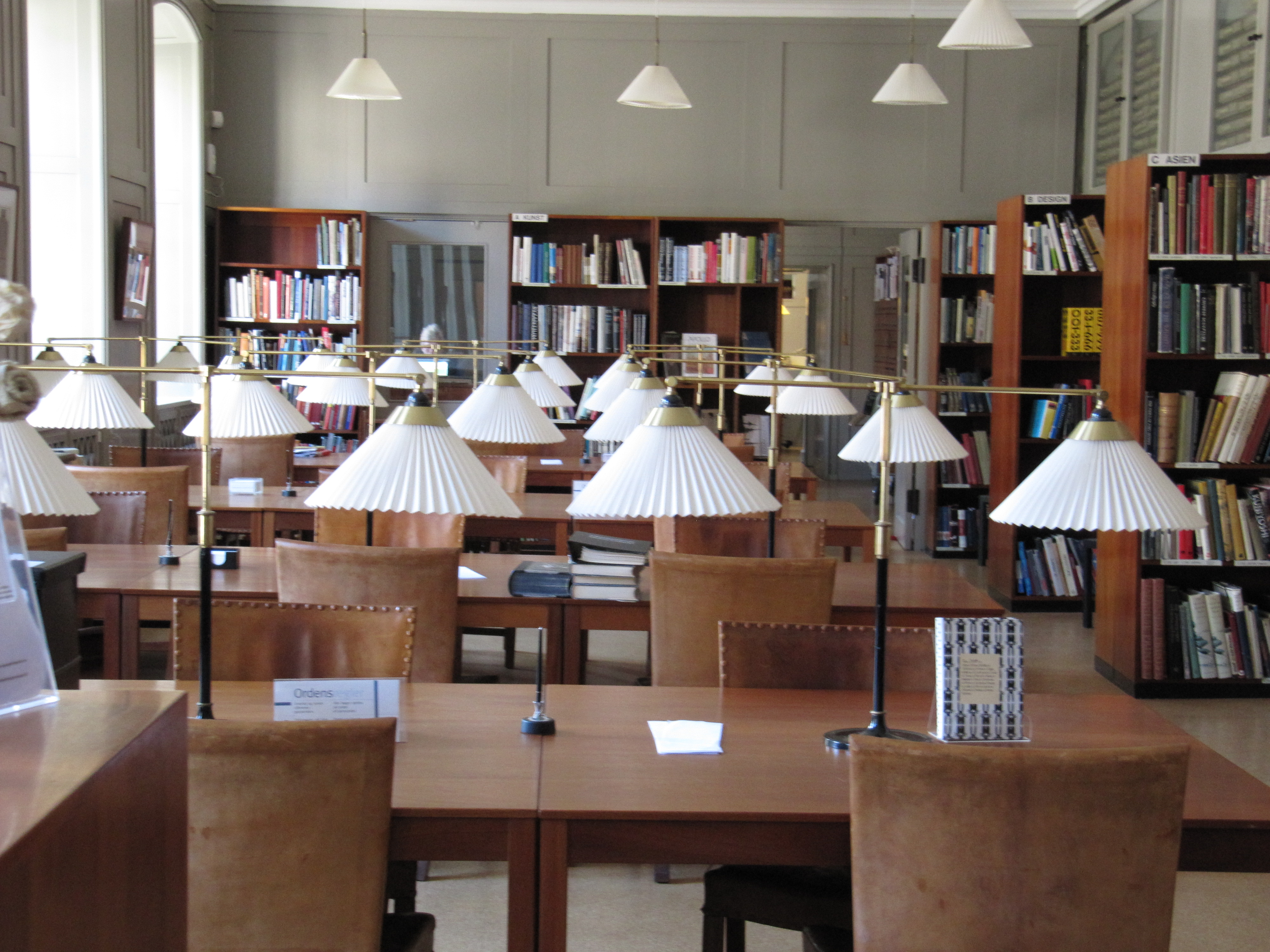
Library at the Danish Design Museum.

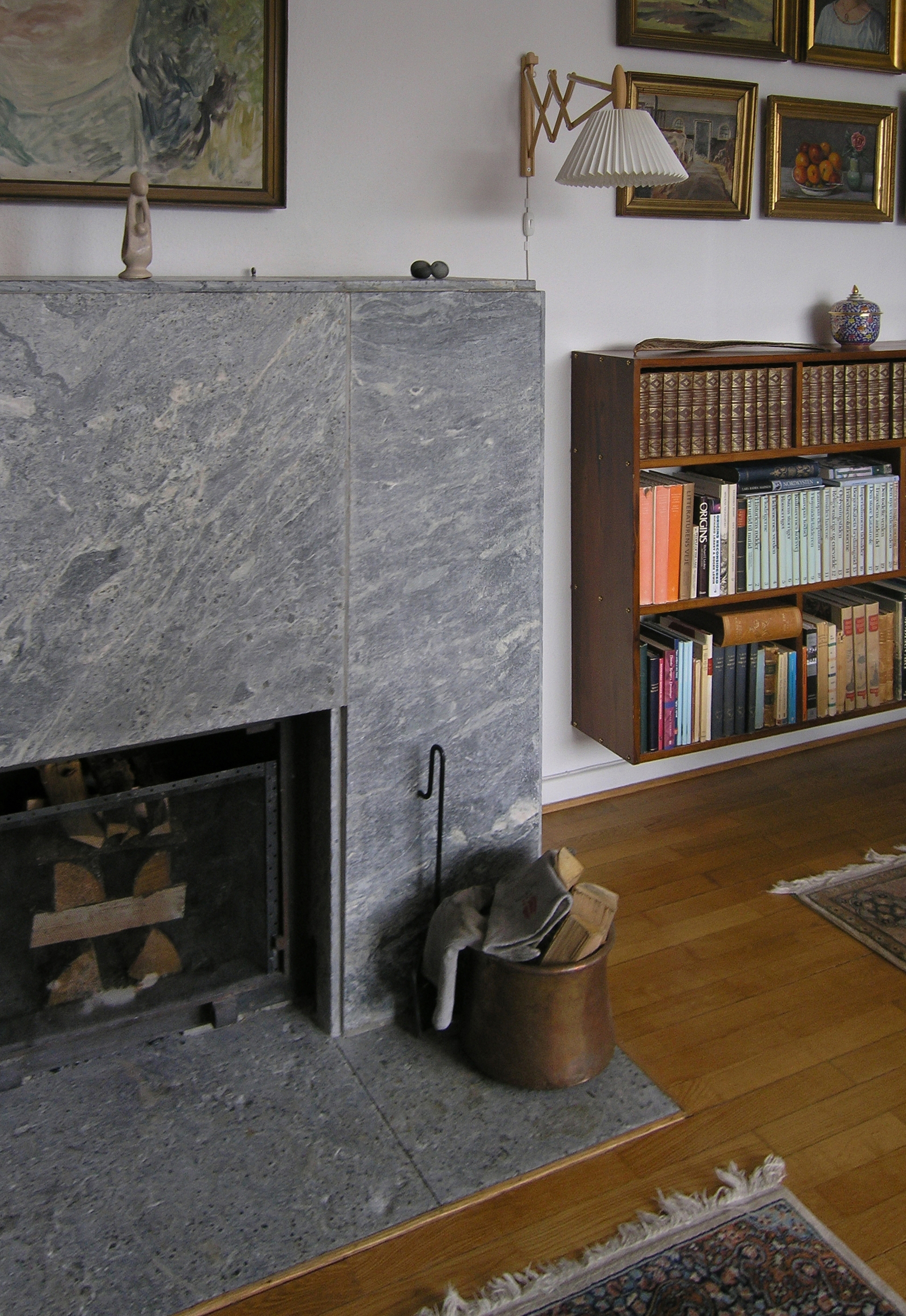
Table and chairs, Danish Design Museum.

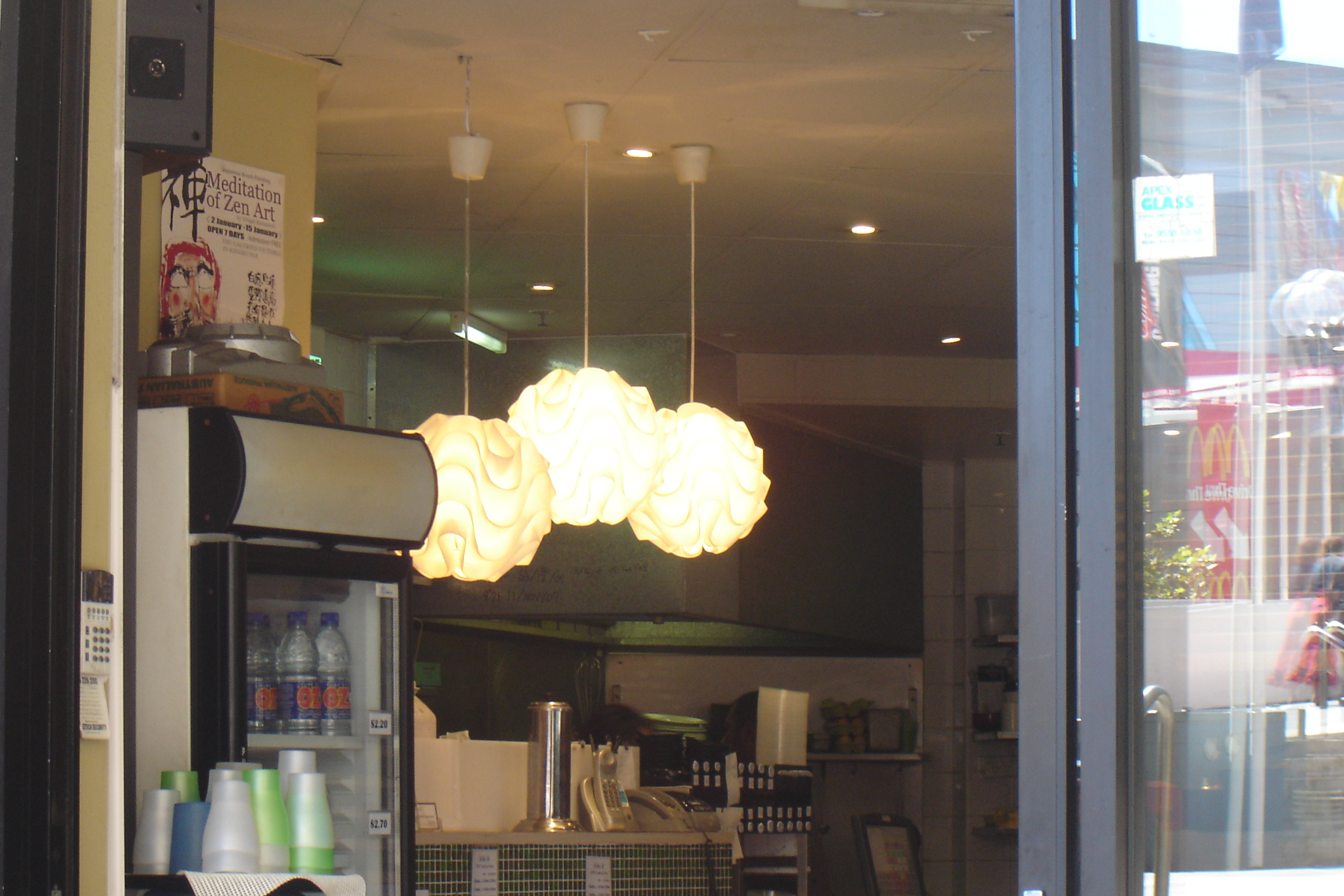
Poul Christiansen's Le Klint 172 lamp in Sydney's China Town.

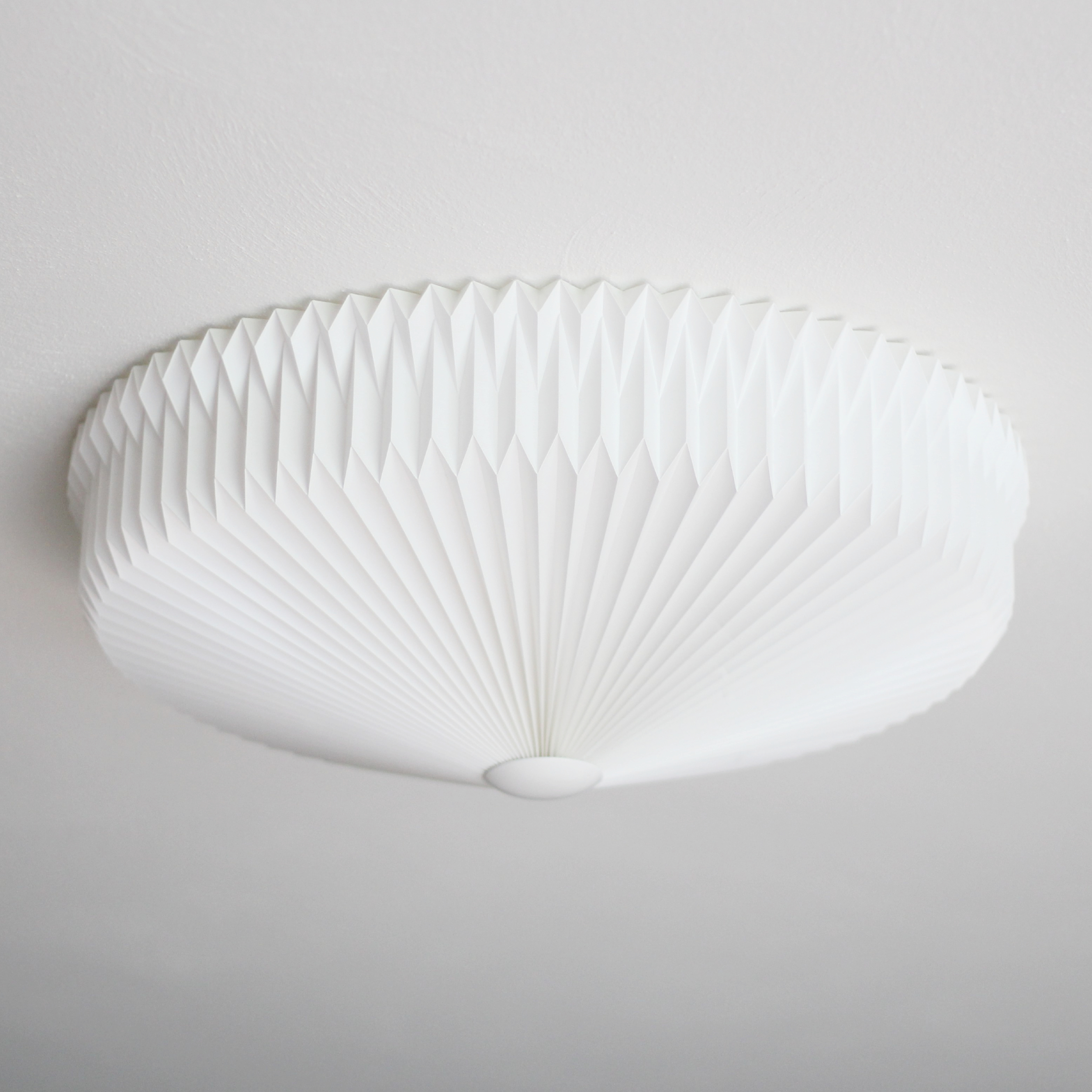
Le Klint Model 30
