= Jacob Holdt =

Danish photographer, writer, and lecturer (born 1947)

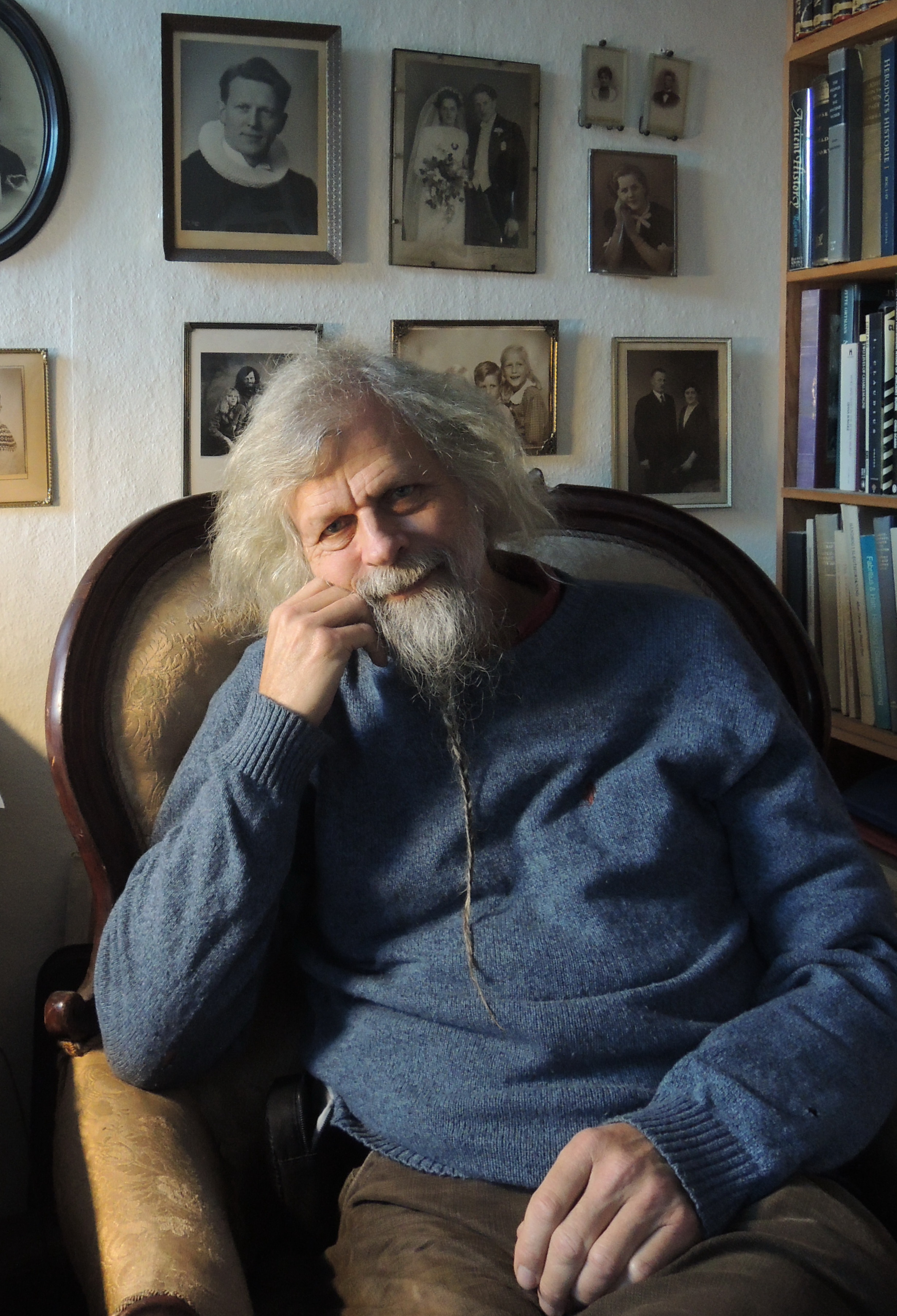
Jacob Holdt, 2016

Jacob Holdt (born 29 April 1947) is a Danish photographer, writer and lecturer. His mammoth work, American Pictures, gained international fame in 1977 for its effective photographic revelations about the hardships of America's lower classes.

Holdt was shortlisted for the Deutsche Börse Photography Prize 2008 and received the Fogtdal Photographers Award in 2009.

== Early life ==
Born in 1947 in Copenhagen, Holdt was the son of the pastor at Grundtvig's Church in Copenhagen. In 1950, the family moved to Fåborg, a village where he spent most of his childhood. After being thrown out of high school in 1965, Holdt attended Krogerup Folk High School, north of Copenhagen. Expelled from the Royal Palace Guard after eight months, Holdt spent several years protesting the Vietnam War and conditions in the Third World.

== Life as a photographer ==
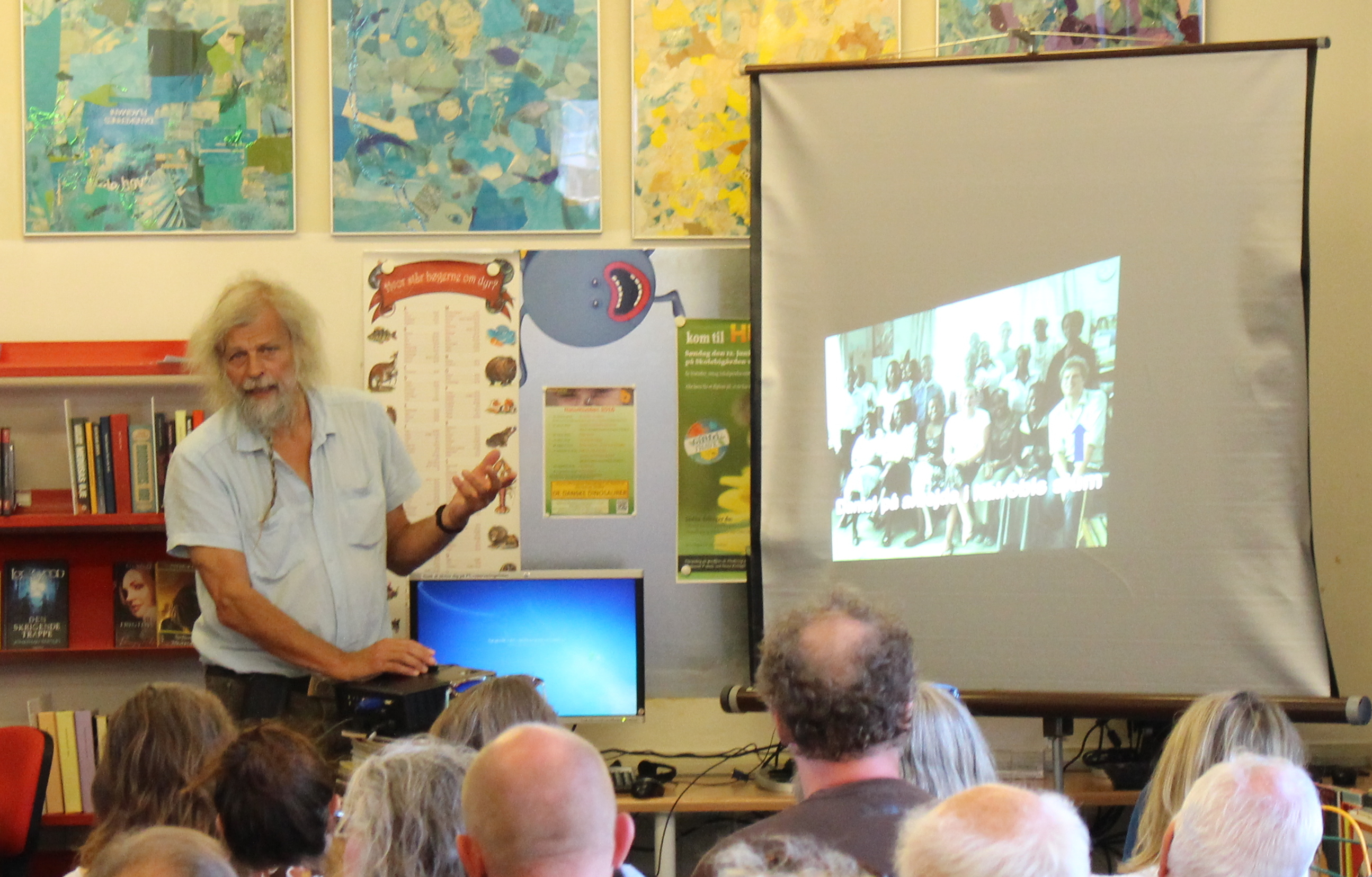
Holdt's slideshow at Allinge Library during the Folkemødet 2016.

In the spring of 1970, Holdt traveled to Canada to work on a farm. He planned to travel to South America to support the government of Salvador Allende after Allende was elected president of Chile in September 1970. Holdt never made it. In the United States, he was robbed. He stayed in the United States and spent four years working in civil rights issues

Arriving with only $40, Holdt was shocked and fascinated by the social differences he encountered. He ended up staying in the USA more than five years, criss-crossing the country by hitchhiking more than 100,000 miles and taking thousands of photographs.

Holdt sometimes sold blood plasma twice a week to buy film. He stayed in more than 400 homes including those of poor migrant workers and America's wealthiest families, including the Rockefellers. He stayed with people who were often so poor they ate cat food and dirt and who lived in rat-infested shacks. Along the way, Holdt took more than 15,000 photographs with a cheap pocket camera.

His work captured the daily struggle of the American underclass and contrasts it with images of the life of America's elite. Upon returning to Denmark in 1976, Holdt began lecturing on social differences in the United States and published a book: American Pictures. He later presented his slideshow at over 300 college campuses across the United States and Canada.

American Pictures had a profound impact on the youth in Scandinavia and Germany, and the Communist bloc saw a chance to use his work against President Carter's human rights campaign. Holdt was approached by the KGB a few months after his slideshow became a success and he saw a chance with the help of the Soviet Union to penetrate the Marxist bureaucracy in Angola. Here it was his intention to spend the money earned from American Pictures in building a hospital in support of the anti-apartheid struggle.

However, when his book was published in 1977 the KGB revealed to him that it was their intention to use it in an all-out campaign against Carter to try to demonstrate that human rights were violated just as egregiously in America as in Russia. Only a month after its publication, Holdt therefore hired his lawyer, Søren B. Henriksen, to stop his own book all over the world. Except for Germany, Holland and Scandinavia, where they already had contracts with his Danish publisher, he managed to stop it, and did not release it again until the end of the Soviet Union.

As a result of losing most of his expected income from the book, Holdt could not finance a hospital, but only a nursing school built for the Namibian resistance group SWAPO in Kwanzu Zul in Angola with matching funds from the European Union. After the liberation of Zimbabwe in 1982 he also supported projects there. At the end of the cold war he was briefly accused of having been a KGB-agent, but it was easy for his publisher, Dagbladet Information, to show that he had actually worked for the other side and had even flown President Carter’s human rights envoy over to approve his film manuscript intended for the American market.

Along with his continuing lectures Holdt has since 1991 worked as a volunteer for CARE (Cooperative for Assistance and Relief Everywhere) in several third world countries. He has continued to document the lives of those in poverty while working for CARE.

His most recent projects have also focused on white supremacist hate groups. Holdt spent time living with leaders of the Ku Klux Klan and photographing their daily lives. Holdt is sympathetic with the people (but not the political views) he encountered in these groups, pointing out that most grew up under marginal circumstances and often were victims of child abuse. Holdt emphasizes the similarities in background between white supremacists and poor minorities.

At the Deutsche Börse Photography Prize exhibition at The Photographers' Gallery in London, Holdt presented his photographs of the "filthy rich" and poverty in America in a slideshow—each image projected onto a plain white wall in a darkened room, immersing the audience in the dark and dreary world of poverty and maximizing its impact. In 2009/10 his pictures were exhibited in the Louisiana Museum of Modern Art.

The film Precious (2009) premiered in Denmark in February 2010. Holdt was invited to introduce the event. In an interview reported in the Danish newspaper Politiken, he spoke of the time he spent with Sapphire in the 1980s in Harlem. They inspired each other and shared an interest in issues of oppression having both explored it from street level.

== Publications ==
- American Pictures. 1977. ISBN 87-981702-0-1.
  - United States 1970–1975. Göttingen, Germany: Steidl, 2007. ISBN 9783865213938.
- Indians and Campesinos in Bolivia. 1991.
- Nepals Jord. 1996.
- Tro, håb og kærlighed – Jacob Holdts Amerika. København: Gyldendal, 2010. ISBN 9788700797345. Exhibition catalogue.
  - Faith, Hope & [love]: Jacob Holdt's America. Humlebæk, Denmark: Louisiana Museum of Modern Art, 2009. ISBN 9788791607677.

== Awards ==
- Shortlisted for the Deutsche Börse Photography Prize 2008, for United States 1970–1975 (2007).
- Fogtdal Photographers Award, Palle Fogtdal, Denmark, 2009.
- Lifelong artist's grant from the Danish Arts Foundation, Danish government.
