= Fogtdal Photographers Award =

The Fogtdal Photographers Awards (Danish: Fogtdals Fotografpriser) is the largest awards programme dedicated specifically to Danish photography. It was established in 2004 by Danish publisher Palle Fogtdal. The awards programme consists of an Honorary Award, rewarded with DKK 250,000, and five other awards, each rewarded with a travel grant of DKK 50,000. Every year the winners are presented in an exhibition at Fotografisk Center in Copenhagen.

== Fogtdal Honorary Award laureates ==
| Year | Laureate |
|---|---|
| 2004 | Viggo Rivad |
| 2005 | Keld Helmer-Petersen |
| 2006 | Krass Clement |
| 2007 | Kirsten Klein |
| 2008 | Morten Bo |
| 2009 | Jacob Holdt |
| 2010 | Marianne Grøndahl |

== Fogtdal Award laureates ==
=== 2008 ===
In 2008 the five winners were:

- Liv Carlé Mortensen
- Torben Eskerod
- Peter Funch
- Kajsa Gullberg/Fryd Frydendahl
- Camilla Holmgren

=== 2009 ===
In 2009 the five winners were:

- Mads Gamdrup
- Tove Kurtzweil
- Finn Larsen
- Trine Søndergaard / Nicolai Howalt
- Signe Vad

== See also ==
- Photography in Denmark
- List of European art awards
- List of photography awards
