= Per Mollerup =

Danish designer, academic, and author (born 1942)

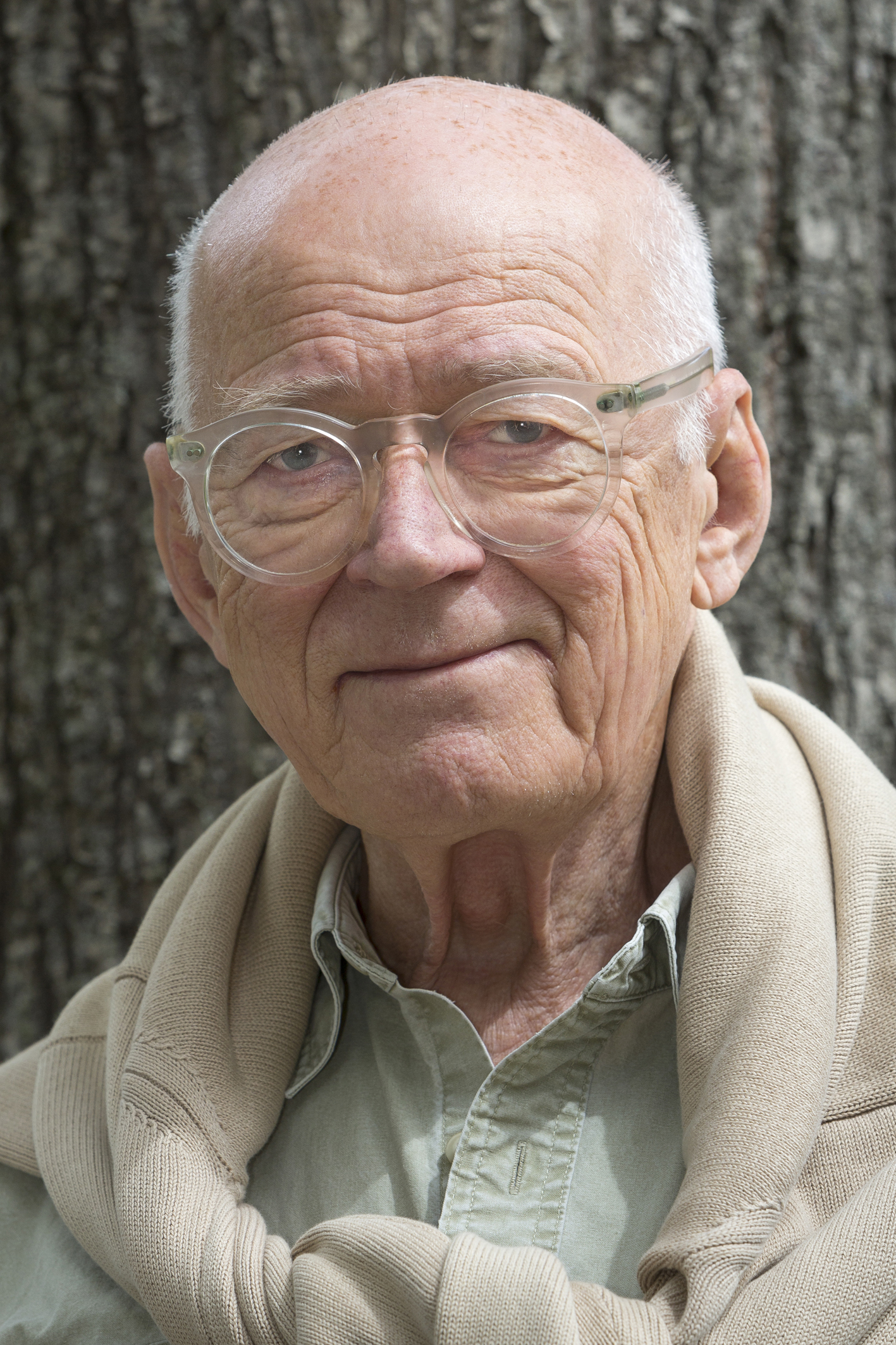
- Mollerup in 2020
- Born: 20 February 1942 (age 84); Nakskov, Denmark
- Education: Aarhus University; Lund University
- Years active: 1974–present
- Awards: Thorvald Bindesbøll Medal

Per Mollerup (born 20 February 1942) is a Danish designer, academic, and author. He is known for his emphasis on simplicity in design and for his wayshowing design at airports in Copenhagen, Oslo, and Stockholm, as well as the Copenhagen Metro. He is currently a Professor of Communication Design at Swinburne University of Technology's School of Design.

Mollerup is the author of Simplicity: A Matter of Design (2015), Wayshowing>Wayfinding (2013) and Wayshowing, A Guide to Environmental Signage (2005). He coined the term "wayshowing".

== Early life and education ==
Mollerup was born in Nakskov, Denmark on 20 February 1942. He completed his MBA from Aarhus School of Business and Social Sciences, Aarhus University in 1968 and a Doctorate in Architecture from Lund University, in 1997.

== Career ==
Mollerup was the editor and publisher of Mobilia Design Magazine from 1974 to 1984. Subsequently, he edited and published Tools Design Journal from 1984 to 1988. In 1984, he founded Designlab and served as its principal till 2009. In 2005, he coined the term "wayshowing" in his book Wayshowing, A Guide to Environmental Signage.

Mollerup designed the visual profile and wayshowing for several public services and private companies. He designed visual profile and wayshowing for Copenhagen Airport in 1989 followed by design for Oslo Airport in 1996, Stockholm Arlanda Airport in 1998, and Arlanda Express, airport train service in 1998. In 2002 Mollerup and Designlab designed the visual profile and wayshowing for Metro Copenhagen. Other design in the public sphere included hospitals and museums in Denmark and abroad. Designlab was awarded the Danish Design Award nine times.

From 2003 Mollerup led changing groups of international experts preparing proposals for national design policies for Estonia (2003), Latvia (2004), and Lithuania (2008).

In 2005, he joined Oslo National Academy of the Arts as professor of Design. In 2009, he joined the Swinburne University of Technology, where he currently serves as professor of communication.

He published a revised and expanded version of his 1997 book Marks of Excellence: The Development and Taxonomy of Trademarks in 2013. The book offers an exploration of the trademark: its history, development, style, classification and relevance in today's world. The book includes discussion of its origins in heraldry, monograms, owner's marks and certificates of origins, and also contains a taxonomy of trademarks and an alphabetical index of trademark themes. In 2013, Mollerup published Wayshowing>Wayfinding, in which he described the difference between wayshowing and wayfinding, and codified the nine wayfinding strategies people use when navigating in unknown territories. In 2015 Mollerup published Simplicity: A Matter of Design, that introduces several concepts which allow designers to analyse, understand, and think about the most sought after design quality. In 2019 Mollerup published Pretense Design: Surface over Substance, in which he named and described design that appears to be something which it not is. Also in 2019, in Dansk Design: Ganske enkelt (Danish Design: Simply) Mollerup described how simplicity (and functionalism) have marked modern Danish design.

== Honours ==
- Prize of Honour of The Danish Society of Book Crafts – 1997

== Selected bibliography ==
- The Corporate Design Programme (1980, 1987, Norwegian translation, 1988)
- Design for Life (1986, translations and later editions in Danish, 1998, Norwegian, 1998, Swedish, 1997, 2007, and Lithuanian, 2010)
- Henry Anton Knudsen (1989)
- Good Enough is not Enough: Observations on Public Design (1992)
- JørgenGammelgaard (1995)
- Marks of Excellence: The History and Taxonomy of Trademarks (1997, revised and expanded edition 2013, French translation 1997)
- Collapsibles: A Design Album of Space-Saving Objects (2002), French and German translations 2002, US edition: Collapsible: The Genius of Space-Saving Design (2002)
- Wayshowing: A Guide to Environmental Signage (2005)
- Brandbook: Branding, Feelings, Reason (in Danish) (2008)
- PowerNotes: Slide presentations reconsidered (2011)
- Wayshowing>Wayfinding: Basic & Interactive (2013)
- Data Design: Visualising quantities, locations, connections (2015)
- Simplicity: A Matter of Design (2015)
- Pretense Design: Surface over Substance (2019)
- Dansk design: Ganske enkelt (2019)
