= Fatamorgana (photo school) =

Art photography school in Copenhagen, Denmark

Fatamorgana is a Danish school of art photography in Copenhagen. Founded by Morten Bo in 1999, the school offers one-year introductory courses, divided up into two semesters, covering various aspects of documentary and conceptual photography. The school is located in the Copenhagen district of Amager.

== History ==
Appreciating the need for a Danish institution dedicated to providing an education in art photography, Danish photographer Morten Bo adopted the model used so successfully by Christer Strömholm in Stockholm since 1956.

The school has been awarded grants from several institutions including the Development Fund of the Danish Ministry of Culture, the National Bank's Anniversary Fund, and the royal palace, with a grant from the Prince's Fund "in acknowledgment of its active and efficient contribution."
