= Viggo Rivad =

Danish photographer

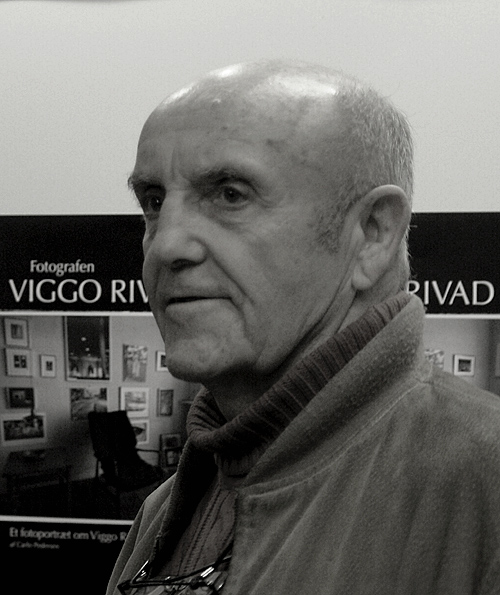
Viggo Rivad

Viggo Reinholdt Rivad (3 July 1922 – 8 February 2016) was a Danish photographer who started as an autodidact in 1946, and went on to win numerous competitions in the 1950s and 1960s. Around 1960, he adopted his so-called "essay approach", resulting in a series of related photographs, such as Et farvel (1962) and Laurits (1971). Rivad, who also earned a living as a taxi driver, was a quiet, dedicated photographer, concentrating on disadvantaged areas and people on the fringes of society. His humanitarian messages were a result of his indignation, and his concern for society's outcasts.

Rivad died in Copenhagen on 8 February 2016 at the age of 93.

== Early life ==
Rivad was raised in Nørrebro, one of the poorer districts in Copenhagen. He had had a number of jobs, and had attempted to become both a racing cyclist and a painter, before he began photographing Copenhagen's coffee bars and night life in the 1940s. In the 1950s, with his photographs of the slums of Paris and Barcelona, he developed a reputation as Denmark's leading humanitarian photographic documentarist.

== Photographic career ==
In 1946, at age 24, Rivad published two photographs in the Danish magazine "Focus". They looked like stills taken from a movie. One of them, titled "Paris in Copenhagen", was taken beside the Knippelsbro in Copenhagen, with the photographer acting as a model. His ostensibly spontaneous pictures, frequently submitted to newspaper competitions, were often carefully prearranged compositions designed to convey a clear message. This approach was very different from that of most amateur photographs at the time.

Rivad developed the photographic essay, a documentary work often in the form of series of photographs. He had been inspired by the series he had seen in photo books, Paris Match and Life, as well as by the 1957 "Family of Man" exhibition in Copenhagen. His technique often consisted of starting with a few rather subdued images leading up to ever stronger and more exciting ones, before the final culmination. He would frequently change the chronological sequencing, so that his pictures were not so much "pictures of a story" as "a story in pictures". The essay approach also allowed him to delve more deeply into a given topic.

The sequence "Et Farvel" (A Goodbye) (1962) was his breakthrough. In it, he follows an elderly woman who takes care of her husband lying on his deathbed, and then leaves the hospital. It was published in the Danish magazine Focus in 1963. The essay consisted of only three photographs, but the spacing and pauses between them was just as evocative as the pictures themselves. "Among the most gripping Danish amateur photographs ever taken" was the magazine's comment.

It was his sympathy for those less well-off in society which inspired him to compose essays such as "Fru Svendsen" (Mrs. Svendsen) (1963), "Franskmanden" (The Frenchman to ) (1963) and "En Barberstue" (A Barber's Shop) (1969). In contrast to the high-society reports in the weeklies, his essays showed that stories could be told about society's most ordinary people.

In 1969, the cultural group M59 invited him to exhibit, demonstrating that photography had become an art. His work became all the more appreciated at the end of the 1960s, when there was growing interest in the working classes and disadvantaged members of society. In 1972, Rivad's series on the occupation of the Fredensgården district of Copenhagen was typical of the times when more attention was given to demonstrators, and those affected by conflicts, than to the politicians involved. The series was published in "8 Skildinger", which came out in 1975.

During his career, Rivad produced photographic series on Spain, Morocco, Israel, Mexico, Venice, the Sahara, the Soviet Union, Auschwitz, China, Yemen, Central Asia, Venezuela, Ethiopia, Tunis, Egypt, Vietnam, Laos, Cuba and Denmark.

== Awards ==
- 1974: Viggo Rivad was the first photographer to be awarded a three-year work grant from the Danish Arts Agency
- 1985: Thorvald Bindesbøll Medal
- 2004: Fogtdal Photographers Award

== Bibliography ==
All works are in Danish:

- Pedersen, Carlo, Fotografen Viggo Rivad, BIOS, Copenhagen, 2008, 120 pp. ISBN 978-87-7056-040-5.
- Rivad, Viggo, 101 danske billedkunstnere, Palle Fogtdal, 2004, 120 pp. ISBN 87-7248-549-3
- Rivad, Viggo, Amra: en nubisk kvinde, Gyldendal, 1997. ISBN 87-00-32316-0
- Rivad, Viggo; Hebsgaard, Mark, Fra Venezia, Rhodos, 1980, 103 pp. ISBN 87-7496-774-6
- Rivad, Viggo, Set: Viggo Rivad: fotografier 1948-1994, Gyldendal, 1994, 179 pp. ISBN 87-00-19716-5
- Rivad, Viggo, 8 Skildringer, Arnold Busck, 1975
- Rivad, Viggo, Vennerne i Aswan, Rhodos, 2000. ISBN 87-7245-846-1
- Schwander, Lars, Viggo Rivad: mellem lys og skygge: en biografi, Rhodos, 2000, 201 pp. ISBN 87-7245-849-6.
