= Charlotte Haslund-Christensen =

Danish visual artist

Charlotte Haslund-Christensen (born 1963) is a Danish lens-based visual artist born and based in Copenhagen. She is a graduate of the Danish school of art photography Fatamorgana (1996) and the International Center of Photography in New York (1997).

Haslund-Christensen’s long-term projects are performative and documentary, taking their impetus from the specific contexts in which they are created, for example anthropological ‘expeditions’ (the artist as explorer in Natives: The Danes), in the basement of a police station (posing as a mugshot photographer for Who’s Next?) or as a traveling photographer or camerawoman in local communities (in Heroes, To Tingberg with Love and Hope & Fear - work in progress). A common political thread throughout her oeuvre is addressing stereotypes and the role of the media - past and the present - in their creation.

Her work as an artist has been analysed as operating at the intersection of documentarism, anthropology and social intervention. Whilst each project has its own conscious, visual and often staged film or photographic form – based on the specific historical or contemporary media it interrogates – each is motivated by her meetings with people, investigating the gap between their hopes, lives and dreams and the apparently incessant need for the racial, gendered or religious ‘other’ in a global climate of increasing fear. Her works have been exhibited widely nationally and internationally, and are part of both private and public collections including a collected artpiece at the National Museum of Photography (Denmark).
