= List of Danish women artists =

This is a list of women artists who were born in Denmark or whose artworks are closely associated with that country.

== A ==
- Gudrun Stig Aagaard (1895–1986), textile artist
- Astrid Aagesen (1883–1965), designer working with tin and silver, active in Helsingborg, Sweden
- Nanna Aakjær (1874–1962), carpenter and woodcarver
- Naja Abelsen (born 1964), Greenlandic painter and illustrator
- Lene Adler Petersen (born 1944), multidisciplinary artist
- Margrethe Agger (born 1943), textile artist specializing in tapestry
- Else Alfelt (1910–1974), painter
- Catherine Engelhart Amyot (1845–1926), portrait and genre painter
- Anna Ancher (1859–1935), painter associated with the Skagen Painters
- Helga Ancher (1883–1964), painter, daughter of Anna and Michael Ancher
- Rigmor Andersen (1903–1995), furniture designer
- Astrid Andreasen (born 1948), Faroese textile and graphic artist
- Pia Arke (1958–2007), Greenlandic visual and performance artist, writer and photographer
- Aggi Ásgerð Ásgeirsdóttir (born 1966), Faroese visual artist

== B ==
- Marie Vilhelmine Bang (1848–1932), painter
- Magdalene Bärens (1737–1808), painter
- Merete Barker (born 1944), painter, contemporary artist
- Gerda Bengtsson (1900–1995), textile artist
- Johanne Bindesbøll (1851–1934), textile artist
- Malene Birger (born 1962), fashion designer
- Agnete Bjørneboe (born 1943), painter, mosaic artist and paper cutter
- Anna Sofie Boesen Dreijer (1899–1986), schoolteacher and textile artist
- Elisa Maria Boglino (1905–2002), painter
- Thyra Boldsen (1884–1968), sculptor
- Elna Borch (1869–1950), sculptor
- Birthe Bovin (1908–1980), painter
- Elise Brandes (1873–1918), sculptor
- Margit Brandt (1945–2011), fashion designer
- Lilian Brøgger (born 1950), illustrator
- Birthe Bovin (1906–1980), painter associated with the Odsherred Painters
- Lilian Brøgger (born 1950), illustrator
- Laura Brun-Pedersen (1883–1961), landscape painter
- Eva Louise Buus (born 1979), painter

== C ==
- Louise Campbell (born 1970), furniture and lighting designer
- Anne Marie Carl-Nielsen (1863–1945), sculptor
- Ebba Carstensen (1885–1967), Cubist painter
- Bibi Chemnitz (born 1983), Greenlandic fashion designer
- Anthonore Christensen (1849–1926), flower painter
- Kirsten Christensen (born 1943), painter and ceramist
- Franciska Clausen (1899–1986), painter
- Marie Jeanne Clemens (1755–1791), French-Danish engraver, pastel artist
- Kirsten Christensen (born 1943), painter, ceramist
- Viera Collaro (born 1946), light art specialist
- Hedvig Collin (1880–1964), painter, illustrator and children's writer
- Lilibeth Cuenca Rasmussen (born 1970), Philippine-born video and performance artist

== D ==
- Dorte Dahlin (born 1955), painter, graphic artist
- Inger Lut Debois (1931–2015), painter, headed the Danish Society of Female Artists
- Kirsten Dehlholm (1945–2024), scenic artist
- Nanna Ditzel (1923–2005), furniture designer
- Augusta Dohlmann (1847–1914), painter
- Helen Dohlmann (1870–1942), sculptor
- Bertha Dorph (1875–1960), painter, designer
- Margrete Drejer (1889–1975), textile artist
- Kirsten Dufour (born 1941), visual artist

== E ==
- Maja Lisa Engelhardt (born 1956), painter
- Tina Enghoff (born 1957), photographer, video artist and writer
- Lisa Engqvist (1914–1989), ceramist
- Merete Erbou Laurent (born 1949), weaver and magazine editor
- Helle-Vibeke Erichsen (1940–2016), etcher, painter, created caricatures of people she met
- Gutte Eriksen (1918–2008), ceramist
- Charlotte Eskildsen (born 1975), fashion designer
- Helga Exner (born 1939), Czech-born Danish goldsmith and jeweller

== F ==
- Julie Fagerholt (born 1968), fashion designer
- Sonja Ferlov Mancoba (1911–1984), avant-garde sculptor
- Else Fischer-Hansen (1905–1996), abstract painter
- Helga Foght (1902–1974), textile artist
- Elna Fonnesbech-Sandberg (1892–1994), art collector, painter
- Johanna Marie Fosie (1726–1764), Denmark's first professional female artist
- Ingeborg Frederiksen (1886–1976), painter and botanical illustrator
- Dagmar Freuchen-Gale (1907–1991), illustrator and writer
- Edma Frølich (1859–1958), painter

== G ==
- Esther Gehlin (1892–1949), Danish-Swedish painter and textile artist
- Emily Gernild (born 1985), Danish-born artist
- Irene Griegst (born 1945), Moroccan-born Danish goldsmith
- Edith Grøn (1917–1990), Danish-born Nicaraguan sculptor

== H ==
- Henriette Hahn-Brinckmann (1862–1934), painter, printmaker
- Christina Liljenberg Halstrøm (born 1977), furniture designer
- Bente Hammer (born 1950), textile artist and fashion designer
- Charlotte Hanmann (born 1950), photographer, painter and graphic artist
- Inger Hanmann (1918–2007), painter and enamelwork artist
- Karen Hannover (1872–1943), ceramist
- Gerda Henning (1891–1951), weaver and textile designer
- Gesa Hansen (born 1981), German-Danish furniture designer
- Charlotte Haslund-Christensen (born 1963), photographic artist
- Emilie Demant Hatt (1873–1958), artist, writer and ethnographer
- Irene Hedlund (born 1947), illustrator and children's writer
- Effie Hegermann-Lindencrone (1869–1945), porcelain artist
- Berit Heggenhougen-Jensen (born 1956), painter
- Ella Heide (1871–1956), associated with the younger generation of Skagen painters
- Hanne Hellesen (1801–1844), flower painter
- Ghita Hempel (1899–1948), painter
- Marie Henriques (1866–1944), painter
- Louise Hindsgavl (born 1973), ceramic artist
- Berit Hjelholt (1920–2016), textile artist
- Anne Mette Hjortshøj, contemporary studio potter
- Aka Høegh (born 1947), Greenlandic painter, graphic artist and sculptor
- Hanna Hoffmann (1868–1917), sculptor, silversmith and textile artist
- Nina Hole (1941–2016), ceramist
- Astrid Holm (1876–1937), painter and textile artist
- Ebba Holm (1889–1967), painter, engraver
- Olivia Holm-Møller (1875–1970), painter, sculptor
- Sophie Holten (1858–1930), painter
- Suzette Holten (1863–1937), painter, ceramist
- Anne-Birthe Hove (1951–2012), Greenlandic graphic artist
- Jytte Høy (born 1951), contemporary artist, educator
- Bizzie Høyer (1888–1971), painter, art teacher
- Lone Høyer Hansen (1950–2021), sculptor

== I ==
- Lucie Ingemann (1792–1868), painter, remembered for altar paintings

== J ==
- Ville Jais Nielsen (1886–1949), portrait painter
- Grete Jalk (1920–2006), furniture designer
- Elisabeth Jerichau-Baumann (1819–1881), Polish-Danish painter
- Kirsten Justesen (born 1943), sculptor, scenographer, installation artist

== K ==
- Bodil Kaalund (1930–2016), painter, textile artist, church decorator
- Sigrid Kähler (1874–1923), ceramist and painter
- Jane Jin Kaisen (born 1980), visual artist, filmmaker
- Sophia Kalkau (born 1960), multidisciplinary artist
- Rita Kernn-Larsen (1904–1998), surrealist painter
- Helvig Kinch (1872–1956), painter
- Bodil Kjær (born 1932), furniture designer
- Elle Klarskov Jørgensen (born 1958), sculptor
- Kirsten Kjær (1893–1985), expressive painter
- Kirsten Klein (born 1945), photographer
- Anna Klindt Sørensen (1899–1985), painter
- Vibeke Klint (1927–2019), textile artist
- Eva Koch (born 1953), sculptor
- Elise Konstantin-Hansen (1858–1946), painter, ceramist
- Ann-Mari Kornerup (1918–2006), Swedish-Danish textile artist
- Holcha Krake (1885–1944), textile artist
- Theodora Krarup (1862–1941), portrait painter
- Ellen Krause (1905–1990), painter associated with the Odsherred Painters
- Johanne Cathrine Krebs (1848–1924), painter
- Nathalie Krebs (1895–1978), potter
- Dorthe Kristoffersen (1906–1976), Greenlandic sculptor
- K'itura Kristoffersen (born 1939), Greenlandic sculptor
- Sara Kristoffersen (1937–2008), Greenlandic sculptor
- Charlotte Christiane von Krogh (1827–1913), painter
- Marie Krøyer (1867–1940), painter associated with the Skagen Painters

== L ==
- Jenny la Cour (1849–1928), textile artist and educator
- Marie Gudme Leth (1895–1997), textile designer pioneering screen printing
- Kirsten Lockenwitz (born 1932), painter and sculptor
- Alexia de Lode (1737–1765), copper-plate etcher
- Christine Løvmand (1803–1872), painter
- Agnes Lunn (1850–1941), painter, sculptor
- Marie Luplau (1848–1925), painter
- Anne Marie Lütken (1916–2001), painter
- Julie Lütken (1788–1816), early landscape painter
- Sigrid Lütken (1915–2008), sculptor focusing on abstract works depicting plants, animals and people
- Nanna Lysholt Hansen (fl. 2005–), performance artist and curator

== M ==
- Anne Sofie Madsen (born 1979), fashion designer
- Lise Malinovsky (born 1957), painter
- Thyra Manicus-Hansen (1872–1906), ceramic artist, trade unionist
- Cecilie Manz (born 1972), furniture designer
- Cathrine Marie Møller (1744–1811), embroiderer
- Christel Marott (1919–1992), illustrator, painter and sculptor
- Julie Marstrand (1882–1943), Danish sculptor and writer
- Helene Moltke-Leth (born 1973), film director and artist
- Inger Møller (1886–1979), silversmith
- Dea Trier Mørch (1941–2001), artist, writer
- Ursula Munch-Petersen (1937–2025), ceramist
- Emilie Mundt (1842–1922), painter
- Jane Muus (1919–2007), painter, illustrator
- Elna Mygdal (1868–1940), textile artist, museum director
- Vera Myhre (1920–2000), painter and graphic artist

== N ==
- Kim Naver (born 1940), designer and textile artist
- Elisabeth Neckelmann (1884–1956), painter and head of the Danish Society of Female Artists
- Hermania Neergaard (1799–1875), still life painter
- Jette Nevers (born 1943), textile artist and designer
- Elsa Nielsen (1923–2011), graphic artist
- Ville Jais Nielsen (1886–1949), painter
- Astrid Noack (1888–1954), sculptor
- Ernestine Nyrop (1888–1975), textile artist and fresco painter

== O ==
- Tove Ólafsson (1909–1992), sculptor
- Dagmar Olrik (1860–1932), painter and tapestry artist
- Kirsten Ortwed (born 1948), sculptor
- Sara Mathilde Øster (born 1973), painter

== P ==
- Sophie Pedersen (1885–1950), painter
- Johanne Pedersen-Dan (1860–1934), sculptor
- Anna Petersen (1845–1910), painter
- Nielsine Petersen (1851–1916), sculptor
- Ingeborg Plockross Irminger (1872–1962), sculptor
- Etiyé Dimma Poulsen (born 1968), sculptor, ceramist
- Gudrun Poulsen (1918–1999), painter, president of Kvindelige Kunstneres Samfund, female artists society
- Bolette Puggaard (1798–1847), landscape painter

== R ==
- Anu Ramdas (born 1980), artist
- Pia Ranslet (born 1956), painter and sculptor
- Franka Rasmussen (1907–1994), German-born Danish textile artist
- Louise Ravn-Hansen (1849–1909), painter and etcher
- Jane Reumert (1942–2016), ceramist
- Jytte Rex (born 1942), painter, writer, filmmaker
- Lise Ring (born 1936), sculptor and art organization player
- Monica Ritterband (born 1955), artist, designer
- Elizabeth Romhild (born 1960), Danish-Armenian painter, sculptor and designer
- Kirstine Roepstorff (born 1972), artist

== S ==
- Naja Salto (1945–2016), textile artist
- Tusnelda Sanders (1894-1978), painter, designer
- Marie Sandholt (1872–1942), painter and ceramist
- Anna Sarauw (1839–1919), textile artist
- Helen Schou (1905–2006), sculptor
- Alev Ebüzziya Siesbye (born 1938), Turkish-Danish ceramist
- Vigdis Sigmundsdóttir (1934–2023), Faroese collage artist
- Agnes Slott-Møller (1862–1937), symbolist painter
- Ruth Smith (1913–1958), Faroese painter
- Dagmar Starcke (1899–1975), textile artist
- Georgia Skovgaard (1828–1868), embroiderer
- Agnes Slott-Møller (1862–1937), painter
- Agnes Smidt (1874–1952), painter and Danish culture supporter in Southern Jutland
- Eva Sørensen (1940–2019), sculptor, ceramist
- Grethe Sørensen (born 1947), textile artist
- Dagmar Starcke (1899–1975), painter and textile artist
- Nina Sten-Knudsen (born 1957), painter
- Birte Stenbak (born 1938), goldsmith and jewellery designer
- Gudrun Stig Aagaard (1895–1986), textile designer
- Karen Strand (1924–2000), goldsmith, jewellery designer
- Kamma Svensson (1908–1998), illustrator
- Christine Swane (1876–1960), painter
- Anna Syberg (1870–1914), painter

== T ==
- Anne Marie Telmányi (1893–1983), painter, writer
- Anna Thommesen (1908–2004), textile artist
- Emma Thomsen (1820–1897), painter
- Pauline Thomsen (1858–1931), painter, art teacher
- Helle Thorborg (born 1927), painter and graphic designer
- Elisa Marie Thornam (1857–1901), painter and illustrator
- Emmy Thornam (1852–1935), flower painter and writer
- Ludovica Thornam (1853–1896), painter
- Jette Thyssen (born 1933), textile artist
- Elisabeth Toubro (born 1956), sculptor
- Paula Trock (1889–1979), weaver, textile artist
- Eleonora Tscherning (1817–1890), painter, memoirist
- Nicoline Tuxen (1847–1931), painter

== U ==
- Sara Ulrik (1855–1916), flower painter
- Lin Utzon (born 1946), ceramics, textiles
- Susanne Ussing (1940–1998), artist, ceramist, architect

== V ==
- Ingrid Vang Nyman (1916–1959), illustrator
- Hanne Varming (1939–2022), sculptor and medallist
- Gertrud Vasegaard (1913–2007), ceramist
- Hanne Vedel (born 1933), weaver
- Adelgunde Vogt (1811–1892), sculptor

== W ==
- Olga Wagner (1873–1963), painter and sculptor
- Clara Wæver (1855–1930), embroiderer
- Elisabeth Wandel (1850–1926), painter
- Gertie Wandel (1894–1988), textile artist
- Lise Warburg (born 1932), textile artist and writer
- Gerda Wegener (1886–1940), painter, illustrator
- Bertha Wegmann (1846–1926), portrait painter
- Ida Winckler (1907–1995), textile artist, specializing in embroidery

== See also ==
- List of Danish women photographers
- List of Scandinavian textile artists
