= KUNSTEN Museum of Modern Art Aalborg =

Art museum in Denmark

Kunsten Museum of Modern Art Aalborg

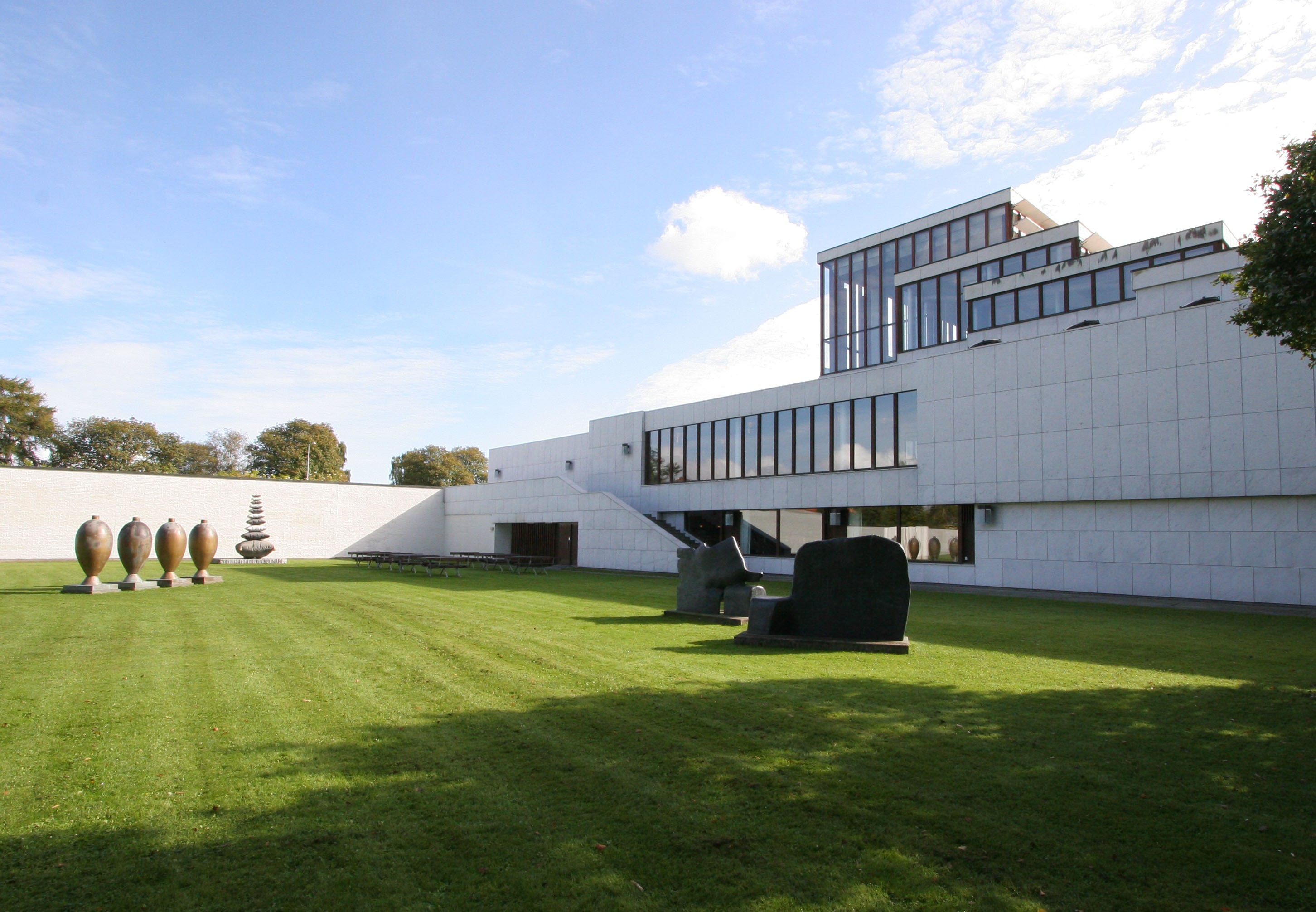
- The museum and sculpture garden

- Location within Denmark
- Established: 1972
- Location: Aalborg, Denmark
- Coordinates: 57°2′34″N 9°54′21″E
- Collection size: 1500 items of collections of modern art
- Visitors: 28,608 (2014)
- Director: Lasse Andersson
- Website: http://kunsten.dk/

Kunsten Museum of Modern Art Aalborg, branded as Kunsten, is located in Aalborg, Denmark, on Kong Christians Allé near its junction with Vesterbro. Of a modern Scandinavian design, it was built between 1968 and 1972 by Finnish architects Elissa and Alvar Aalto and Danish architect Jean-Jacques Baruël. It was completed on 8 June 1972.

The museum has been termed a "showplace for 20th-century Danish and international art", as it showcases both domestic and international modern art collections. It is described as "strikingly contemporary in both form and content".

== History ==
The architectural plans for designing the museum were selected from the 144 submissions made to the Nordic architectural competition by 15 January 1958. The competition was won by the Finnish architects Alvar Aalto, his wife Elissa, and his associate Jean-Jacques Baruël. However, due to financial problems, actual construction only started in 1966. Completed in 1972, it was officially inaugurated on 8 June 1972. It received its present name in 2008, before that it was known as the North Jutland Art Museum in Aalborg (Danish: Nordjyllands Kunstmuseum i Aalborg).

== Features ==
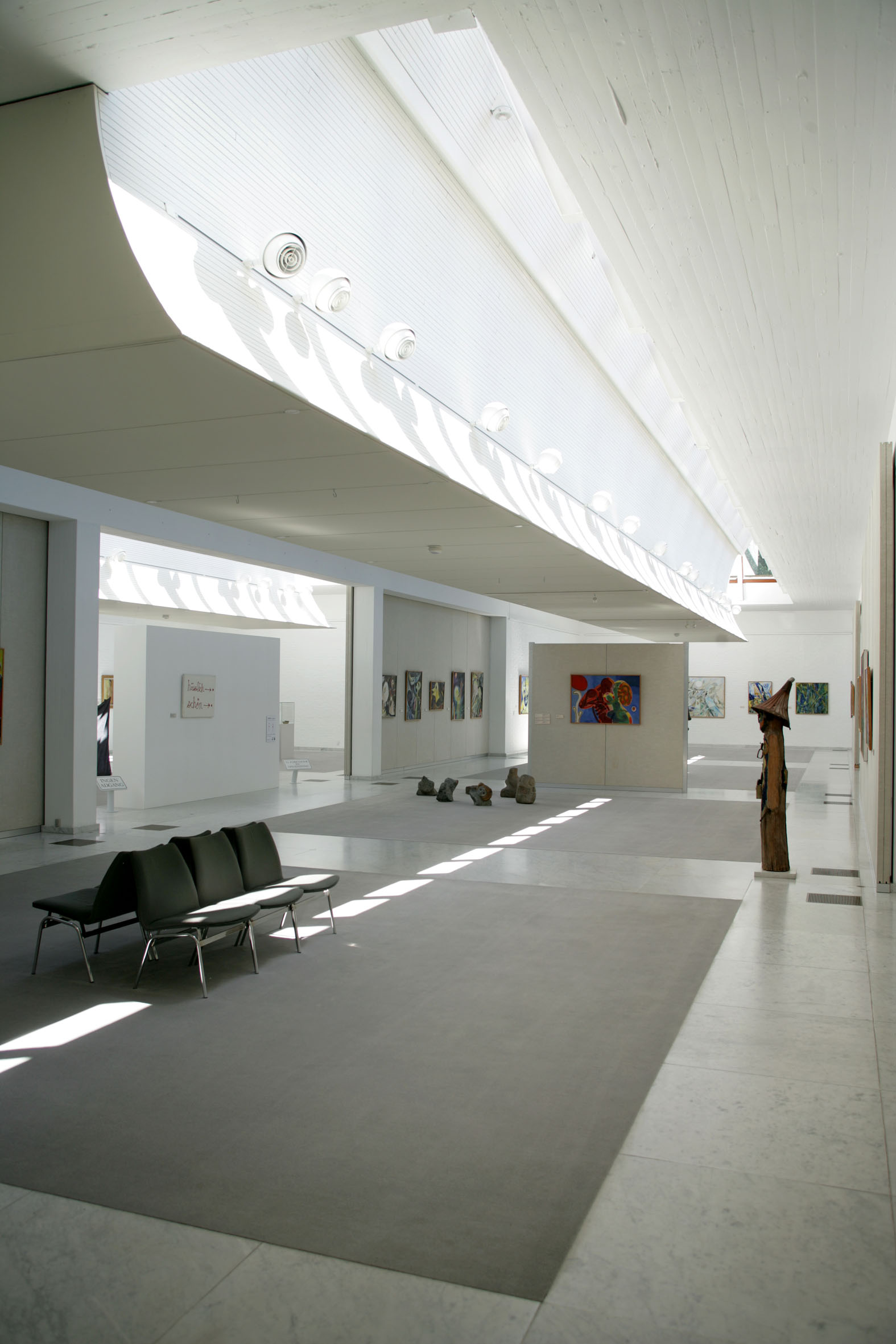
Interior view

The museum, rising against the hills like a ziggurat, extends over 6,000 m^{2} (65,000 sq ft). It is built to a square plan with galleries organised on the ground level around the central exhibition area. In addition to the entrance hall and offices, the building consists of a sculpture gallery, several sky-lit galleries and seven small display rooms. The roof is set above the central hall which rises in the form of a pyramid, providing a skylight in the form of a crown-shaped lantern. Both sides of the central hall have lobbies or galleries which are well lit by natural light while the rear can be divided into smaller rooms by means of flexible walls.

The combination of strategically placed skylights and diffused lighting has effectively "manipulated the Nordic light" in illuminating the galleries, relying on a series of reflectors and light-coloured materials. The "two-sided, elongated skylights" control the sunlight on the southern side to a restricted angle of 56 degrees whereas it is fully open at a 90-degree angle on its northern side. The ceiling has suspended lights with double parabolic reflecting surfaces, avoiding any shadows. The music room in the main building is fitted with prism-shaped skylights. The light, as it gets deflected from the screens, walls and boards induces diffused lighting of the open spaces of the museum, gaining the name of a "light machine". The quality of the light adapts to the needs of day and night.

The basement below the structure fits the natural ground profile and is used for a car park, a restaurant, two lecture rooms, and a maintenance workshop.

The building has been designed in response to its natural context. The external facade is made of marble, glass, wood, and copper sheeting. Most of the interior floor space and pavement are of Carrara marble. The light colours of the materials have been chosen to enhance the appearance of the art works. The main building also houses a children's museum.

== Collection ==
The collection consisting of around 1,500 art objects (from 1900 to the present day) includes paintings, sculptures and other media covering a wide range of naturalism, abstract art and contemporary experimental art. An 1890 painting by the Danish artist J.F. Willumsen (1863–1958) titled Two Woman Parting After a Chat, inspired by Gauguin, stands out among the many other paintings on display. The collection includes paintings from the late 19th and early 20th century by Vilhelm Lundstrøm, Edvard Weie, Jens Søndergaard, Erik Hoppe, Wilhelm Freddie, Ejler Bille, Egill Jacobsen, Victor Isbrand, Asger Jorn, Carl-Henning Pedersen, Sonja Ferlov Mancoba, Richard Mortensen and Robert Jacobsen. The 20th-century art is exemplified by such names as Willy Ørskov, Poul Gernes, Mogens Møller, Kirsten Christensen, Kirsten Ortwed, Kehnet Nielsen and Ingvar Cronhammar. Foreign artists, such as Max Ernst and Chagall, are represented as well.

There are many private collections on display, including the Anna and Kresten Krestensen Collection from 1967 acquired with a grant from the Kirsten and Palle Dige Foundation. The collection also covers "works by the surrealists, members of the Fluxus group and Denmark’s 'wild young artists' from the 1980s".

== Grounds ==
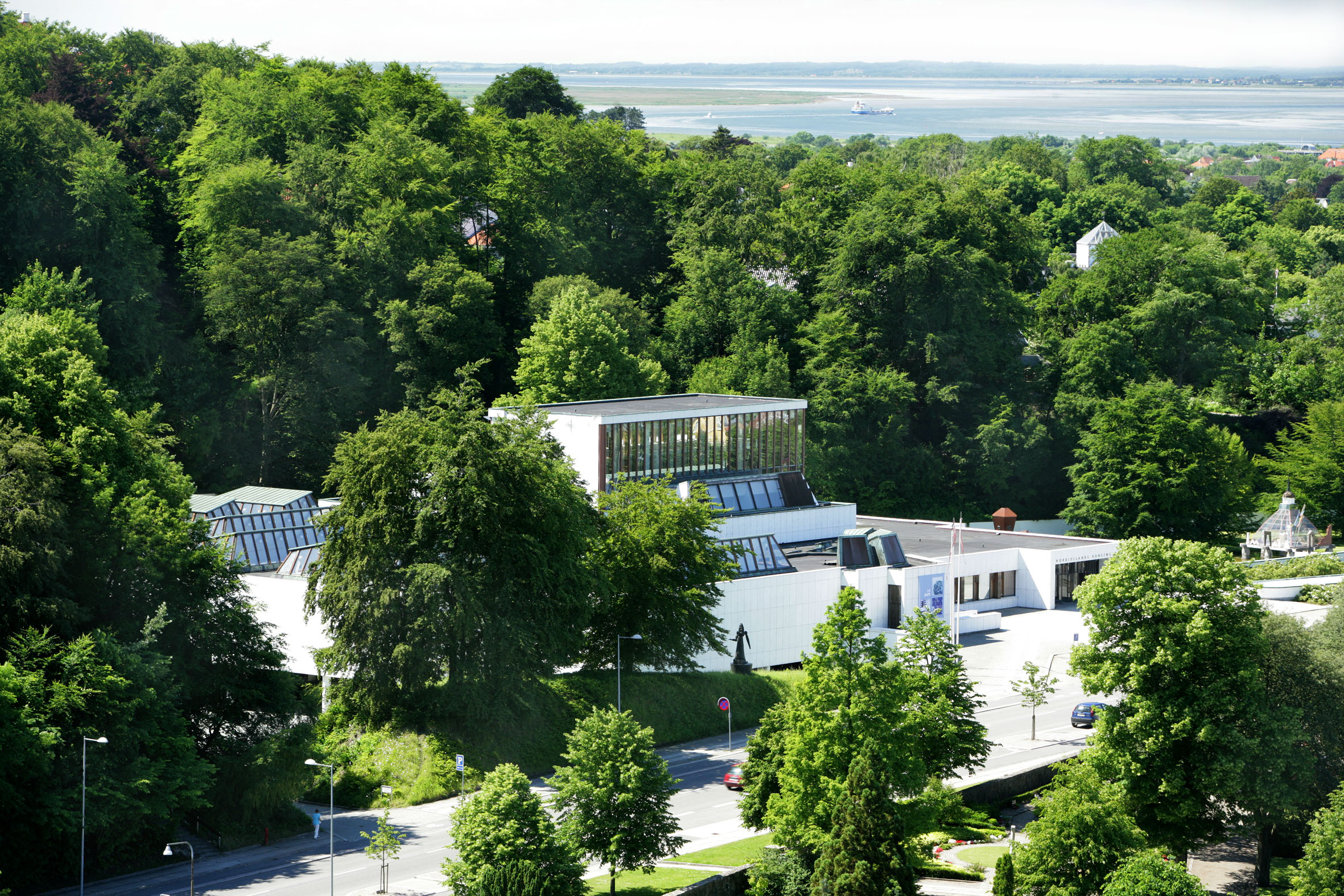
Aerial view of the grounds

The grounds are near the edge of extensive parkland and woodlands, with a backdrop of hills. The surrounding outdoor areas include a well-tended sculpture park, an amphitheatre and a terrace. The sculptures include works by Gunnar Aagaard Andersen, Willy Ørskov, Lene Adler Petersen and Mogens Møller.

== Directors ==
- Lasse Andersson (2020 – )
- Gitte Ørskou (2009 – 2019)
- Nina Hobolth (1989 – 2009)
- Else Bülow (1979 – 1989)
- Lars Rostrup Bøyesen (1970 – 1979)

== Bibliography ==
- Clement, Russell T.; Houzé, Annick; Ramsey, Christiane Erbolato- (2004). A Sourcebook of Gauguin's Symbolist Followers: Les Nabis, Pont-Aven, Rose + Croix. Greenwood Publishing Group. ISBN 978-0-313-31205-2.
- Kindersley, Dorling (1 August 2012). DK Eyewitness. DK Publishing. ISBN 978-0-7566-9465-4.
- Lee, Phil; Brown, Jules; Sinclair, Mick (2003). Scandinavia. Rough Guides. p. 178.
- Ray, Nicholas (2005). Alvar Aalto. Yale University Press. ISBN 978-0-300-10749-4.
