= Elna Fonnesbech-Sandberg =

Danish art collector and painter

- Born: Elna Riegels; 22 March 1892; Copenhagen, Denmark
- Died: 6 March 1994 (aged 101); Gentofte, Denmark
- Known for: Painter, Art collector
- Movement: Abstract Expressionism
- Children: 1 son

Elna Vilhelmine Fonnesbech-Sandberg née Riegels (22 March 1892 – 6 March 1994) was a successful Danish art collector who later became a painter herself. By the late 1929s, she had put together an extensive collection of Danish Modernist and Expressionist works but had to sell them when struck by austerity during World War II. Shortly afterwards, encouraged by her close friend Asger Jorn, she embarked on a new collection of the abstract works of young Danish painters who became members of the CoBrA movement. She exhibited them in her home in Frederiksberg which developed into a popular meeting place for those interested in the latest trends. In 1947, Fonnesbech-Sandberg became a painter herself, joining the group of abstract painters known as Spiralen.

== Early life and family ==
Born in Copenhagen on 22 March 1892, Elna Vilhelmine Riegels was the daughter of the businessman Jacob Frederik Vilhelm Riegels (1863–1943) and his wife Mathilde Marie Pouline née Hansson (1862–1932). Raised in a well-to-do family in Frederiksberg, she studied history of art at the University of Copenhagen. In August 1918, she married the tea merchant Torben Fonnesbech-Sandberg (1891–1974) with whom she had a son Ib (1920). The marriage was dissolved in 1945. In June 1949, she married the painter Niels Jensen (born 1912).

== Career ==
As a child, Elna Riegels had shown interest in collecting paintings, especially Japanese reproductions but lost interest when she realized she could not afford to buy the originals. After studying history of art, she turned her attention to modern art and began to collect paintings by a range of Danish artists including John Christensen (painter), Harald Giersing, Karl Isakson, Søren Hjorth Nielsen, Niels Lergaard, Vilhelm Lundstrøm, Olaf Rude, William Scharff, Jens Søndergaard and Edvard Weie.

After her husband's tea business began to suffer from the effects of World War 2, in 1940, Fonnesbech-Sandberg was forced into selling her collection in order to support the family's well-being. Soon afterwards she developed a close relationship with Asger Jorn and began making a new and even more impressive collection, not only of Jorn's paintings but of those of his friends who included Else Alfelt, Ejler Bille, Egill Jacobsen and Carl-Henning Pedersen. They became known as the Danish members of the CoBrA movement.

As a painter in her own right, Fonnesbech-Sandberg was inspired by her CoBrA friends. She later developed an ornamental style using colour to achieve an enamel effect.

Elna Fonnesbech-Sandberg died on 6 March 1994 in Gentofte.

In 2023 her work was included in the exhibition Action, Gesture, Paint: Women Artists and Global Abstraction 1940-1970 at the Whitechapel Gallery in London.
