= List of Danish women photographers =

This is a list of women photographers who were born in Denmark or whose works are closely associated with that country.

== A ==
- Pia Arke (1958–2007), Greenlandic visual and performance artist, writer and photographer

== B ==
- Jette Bang (1914–1964), large collection of photographs of Greenland depicting the lifestyle of the Greenlandic Inuit
- Mari Bastashevski (born 1980), Russian-born Danish photographer, writer, and artist
- Sisse Brimberg (born 1948), staff photographer for National Geographic completing some 30 stories, now living in Scotland

== C ==
- Helena Christensen (born 1968), fashion photographer contributing to Nylon, Marie Claire, and Elle
- Amalie Claussen (1859–1950), artistic photographer from Skagen

== E ==
- Tina Enghoff (born 1957), photographer, video artist and writer

== F ==
- Frederikke Federspiel (1839–1913), one of the first female photographers to practice in Denmark, an early user of dry plates and flash powder

== G ==
- Marianne Grøndahl (1938–2012), documentary photographer working in the theatrical environment, also in advertising and portraiture

== H ==
- Thora Hallager (1821–1884), one of Denmark's earliest female photographers, practicing daguerreotyping from around 1850
- Caroline Hammer (1832–1915), early professional photographer
- Charlotte Hanmann (born 1950), photographer, painter and graphic artist
- Julie Edel Hardenberg (born 1971), Greenland photographer and book illustrator
- Bodil Hauschildt (1861–1951), early Danish photographer, studio in Ribe
- Johanne Hesbeck (1873–1927), portrait photographer in Holte, north of Copenhagen

== K ==
- Sophia Kalkau (born 1960), art photography, often categorized as performative photography, often related to her work as sculptor.
- Kirsten Klein (born 1945), landscape photographer on the island of Mors with a melancholic style achieved by using older techniques
- Astrid Kruse Jensen (born 1975), specialist in night photography

== J ==
- Astrid Kruse Jensen (born 1975), specializing in night photography often with very long exposure times

== L ==
- Julie Laurberg (1856–1925), portrait and court photographer in Copenhagen

== M ==
- Rigmor Mydtskov (1925–2010), court photographer, also worked in the theatre environment

== S ==
- Mary Steen (1856–1939), Denmark's first female court photographer, opened a studio in 1884, encouraged women to take up photography

== T ==
- Louise Thomsen (1823–1907), early photographer with a studio in Hellebæk

== W ==
- Mary Willumsen (1884–1961), from 1916 produced postcards of women in scanty clothing, now considered an artistic contributor
- Benedicte Wrensted (1859–1949), opened a studio in Horsens in the 1880s before emigrating to the United States, where she photographed Native Americans

== See also ==
- List of women photographers
