= Helle-Vibeke Erichsen =

Danish artist

Helle-Vibeke Erichsen (12 January 1940 – 5 March 2016) was a Danish artist who created caricatures of people she met, initially in the form of etchings and woodcuts. From 1984, she specialized in painting.

== Biography ==
Born in Copenhagen on 12 January 1940, she was the daughter of the artist Børge Erichsen and his wife Dorit Sørensen. After a year at Robert Askou Jensen's art school, she studied at the Royal Danish Academy of Fine Arts under the painter Søren Hjorth Nielsen and the graphic artist Holger J. Jensen (1959–66). Her strange depictions of the people she met bear more resemblance to the works of Jane Muus than to those of her teachers at the Academy. Some of her graphical works were sketched on the spot but most were created on the basis of memory. Her paintings reveal her keen powers of observation, leading to often comical renderings of people in streets and cafés, carefully and colourfully depicted in acrylics. The painter Kjeld Heltoft commented: "In almost all her pictures, the composition is based on a relationship between people, stairs, windows and doors" leading to "a fully personal pictorial world in which the fragility of the figures contrasts with a solid interior or the heavy stones of a wall."

Erichsen began to exhibit at the Charlottenborg Spring Exhibition in 1940. Her works can be found in the Royal Collection of Graphic Art in Copenhagen, at Aalborg's Kunsten and in the art museums of Southern Jutland, Vejle, Randers, Skive and in the Kastrupgård collection.

Helle-Vibeke Erichsen died in Copenhagen on 5 March 2016.

== Published works ==
- Erichsen, Helle-Vibeke (1980). Helle-Vibeke Erichsen: Tableau!. Anders Nyborg.
