= Hjortshøj (surname) =

Hjortshøj is a surname of Danish origin.

People bearing the name Hjortshøj include:

- Anne Mette Hjortshøj, Danish studio potter
- Lars Hjortshøj (born 1967), Danish comedian and television and radio host
- Leif Hjortshøj (born 1942), Danish journalist, TV host and producer
- Majbritt Hjortshøj (born 1976), Danish sports shooter
