= Ic =

IC, Ic, ic, or i.c. may stand for:

== Science and technology ==
=== Astronomy ===
- Index Catalogue, a nebula and other object catalogue used in astronomy
- Type Ic supernova, a subtype of Type I supernova

=== Biology and medicine ===
- Inferior colliculus, a part of the midbrain
- Informed consent, in clinical trials, a form that has to be signed by the patient before entering a study
- Intensive care medicine
- Intermittent catheterisation, a method of relieving the bladder
- Interstitial cystitis, a disease
- Inhibitory Concentration, as in half maximal inhibitory concentration (IC_{50})
- Inspiratory capacity, a measure of lung volumes
- Irreducible complexity, a creationist argument

=== Computing ===
- Index of coincidence, in cryptography
- Integrated circuit, a set of electronic circuits on a semiconductor chip
- Interactive C, a programming language for robotic controllers
- Interconnection, physical linking of a telecommunication carrier's network

=== Economics ===
- Indifference curve, in economics
- Information coefficient, in economics

=== Physics and chemistry ===
- -ic, a suffix describing oxidation state in the IUPAC nomenclature of inorganic chemistry
- I_{C}, or collector current, in bipolar junction transistors
- Ice I_{c}, a metastable cubic crystalline variant of ice
- Ion chromatography
- Ionization chamber, a type of radiation detector

=== Vehicles ===
- IC Bus, a bus manufacturer
- Impuls IC, a German hang glider design
- International Canoe, a powerful and fast single-handed sailing canoe
- Interchange (road), is abbreviated as IC in Japan and Korea

=== Other technologies ===
- ic, a unit of length in the CSS standard equal to the advance measure of the 水 ideograph
- Interchangeable core, a type of lock cylinder
- Isolation condenser, a passive cooling system for boiling water nuclear reactors

== Language ==
- -ić or -ič, a family name suffix in South Slavic languages
- i.c., an abbreviation for the Latin phrase in casu, meaning 'in this case'
- ic, an Old English pronoun
- A Christogram, a series of letters that form the abbreviated name of Jesus Christ
- An independent clause in the study of grammar

== Organizations ==
=== Schools ===
- Illinois College, Jacksonville, Illinois, US
- Imperial College London, UK
- International College, Beirut, Lebanon
- Ithaca College, Ithaca, New York, US

=== Other organizations ===
- Industry Canada, a division of the Canadian government
- Ingobamakhosi Carbineers, an infantry regiment of the South African Army
- United States Intelligence Community, a group of government agencies
- InterContinental, a hotel chain, or its parent company InterContinental Hotels Group
- Iron Cross (Burmese band)
- IC, postnominal letters for a member of the Rosminians, officially the Institute of Charity

== Transportation ==
- Illinois Central Railroad (reporting mark IC)
- Indian Airlines (IATA airline designator IC)
- Intercités, classic long-distance passenger day and night train services in France operated by SNCF
- InterCity, certain long-distance passenger train services in Europe

== Other uses ==
- Canary Islands (ISO 3166-1 code: IC)
- I C, a 2022 short film by Danish filmmaker Helene Moltke-Leth
- IC codes, police shorthand expressions for apparent ethnicity
- Identity card
- Incident commander, person responsible for all aspects of an emergency response
- Independent contractor
- Infinite Craft, a video game by Neal Agarwal
- Internal control, in accounting
- Intimacy coordinator, staff member on theater, film and television productions
- Irish Cup, football cup competition in Northern Ireland
