= Helhesten =

Arts magazine in Denmark (1941–1944)

- Editor: Robert Dahlmann
- Categories: Arts magazine
- Founder: Asger Jorn; Robert Dahlmann
- Founded: 1941
- First issue: April 1941
- Final issue: November 1944
- Country: Denmark
- Based in: Copenhagen
- Language: Danish
- OCLC: 154002703

Helhesten (Danish: The Hell-Horse) was an arts and literary magazine which was published between 1941 and 1944 in Copenhagen, Denmark. It was one of the leading publications during World War II in the region. Its title was a reference to a figure in the Norse mythology.

== History and profile ==
Helhesten was first published in Copenhagen in April 1941 during the Nazi occupation of the city. The magazine was inspired from two former Danish magazines, Klingen and Linien. The founders of Helhesten were Asger Jorn, a painter, and Robert Dahlmann, an architect. They were part of the Danish Harvest group. Robert Dahlmann also edited the magazine.

The magazine adopted an avant-garde approach and opposed the Nazi propaganda. Its main contributors who were supporters of German expressionism, dada and surrealism included Ejler Bille, Henry Heerup, Egill Jacobsen and Carl-Henning Pedersen. They were also interested in the art of the banal. It mostly featured articles on art theory, non-Western work, literature, poetry, film, architecture, and photography in addition to the reviews of art exhibitions and biographies of Danish artists. Asger Jorn's translation of the work by Franz Kafka was serialized in Helhesten which was the first translation of Kafka into Danish. The magazine produced a total of nine issues before its closure in November 1944. The reason for its closure was the financial problems. It was succeeded by another magazine entitled Cobra.

== See also ==
- List of avant-garde magazines
- List of magazines in Denmark
