= Vigdis Sigmundsdóttir =

Faroese artist (1934–2023)

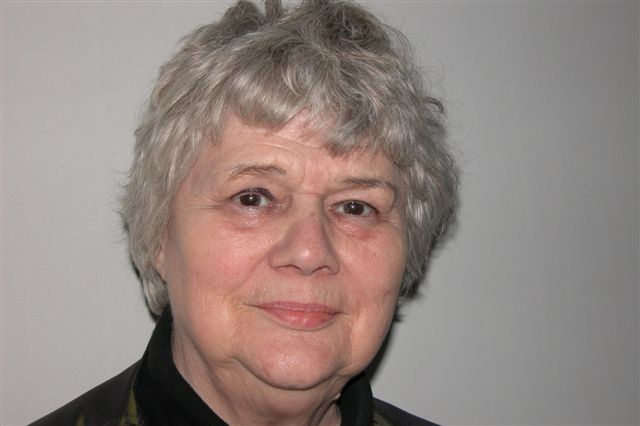
- Born: 1 March 1934
- Died: 23 February 2023 (aged 88)

Vigdis Sigmundsdóttir (1 March 1934 – 23 February 2023) was an artist from the Faroe Islands, known internationally for producing a collage of 12 motifs from Ormurin Langi (The Long Serpent) that resulted in a series of stamps from Postverk Føroya released in 2006.

== Biography ==
Sigmundsdóttir started to draw as a child, with aquarelle and paint on canvas. As a daughter of the Faroese painter Sigmund Petersen, she had favourable surroundings for developing as an artist. Later she mainly concentrated on colourful paper collages. As collages became her passion, she developed her own style and inspiration from the particular light and weather on the Faroe Islands.

Sigmundsdóttir was a part of an artistic family, and her sister Bibi, niece Aggi Ásgerð Ásgeirsdóttir and niece Vígdis Petersen are artists.

Sigmundsdóttir moved to the island of Suðuroy, which is the most southern part of Faroe Islands. She died on 23 February 2023, at the age of 88.

== Education ==
- 1956: Graduated as a Nurse from Randers Centralsygehus
- 1960s: Attended courses on artistic drawing and painting at the School of Art in Randers
- 1972: Graduated as an Indoor Architect from Arkitekt Akademiet in Copenhagen
- 1980: Attended drawing and painting courses at the Nordic House in Tórshavn

== Exhibitions ==
- 1995 The Faroese House, Copenhagen
- 2000 The Faroese House, Copenhagen
- 2001 Galleri Gertrud, Copenhagen
- 2002 Smiðjan í Lítluvík, Tórshavn
- 2004 Ormurin Langi in 'Kulturhuset Førde', Fjalar og Hyllestad, Norway
- 2004 Ministry of Culture, Tórshavn
- 2005 Ormurin Langi in the Nordic House, Reykjavík
- 2006 Ormurin Langi released as 12 stamps
- 2006 Bella Centeret in Copenhagen in association with a Viking Rotary Convention
- 2006 Drew Christmas stamps for Y´Mænds Club, Odense
- 2007 Helligåndshuset, Randers

== Gallery - Ormurin langi (The Long Serpent) ==
Below are some of the art works with motives from the old Faroese ballad "Ormurin langi", which Sigmundsdóttir has created. They were used in a series of Faroese Stamps by Postverk Føroya in 2006.

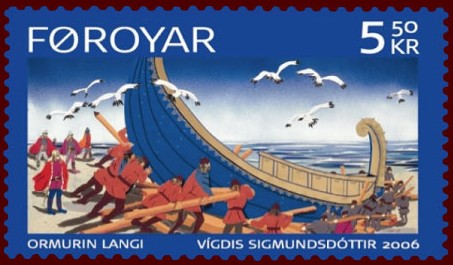

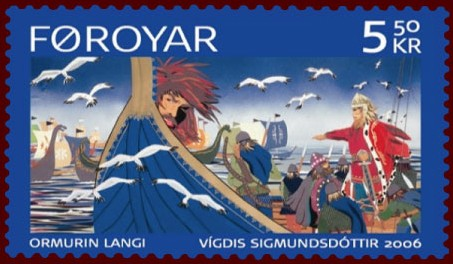

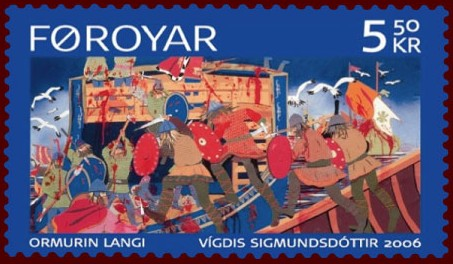
