= Emily Gernild =

Danish artist

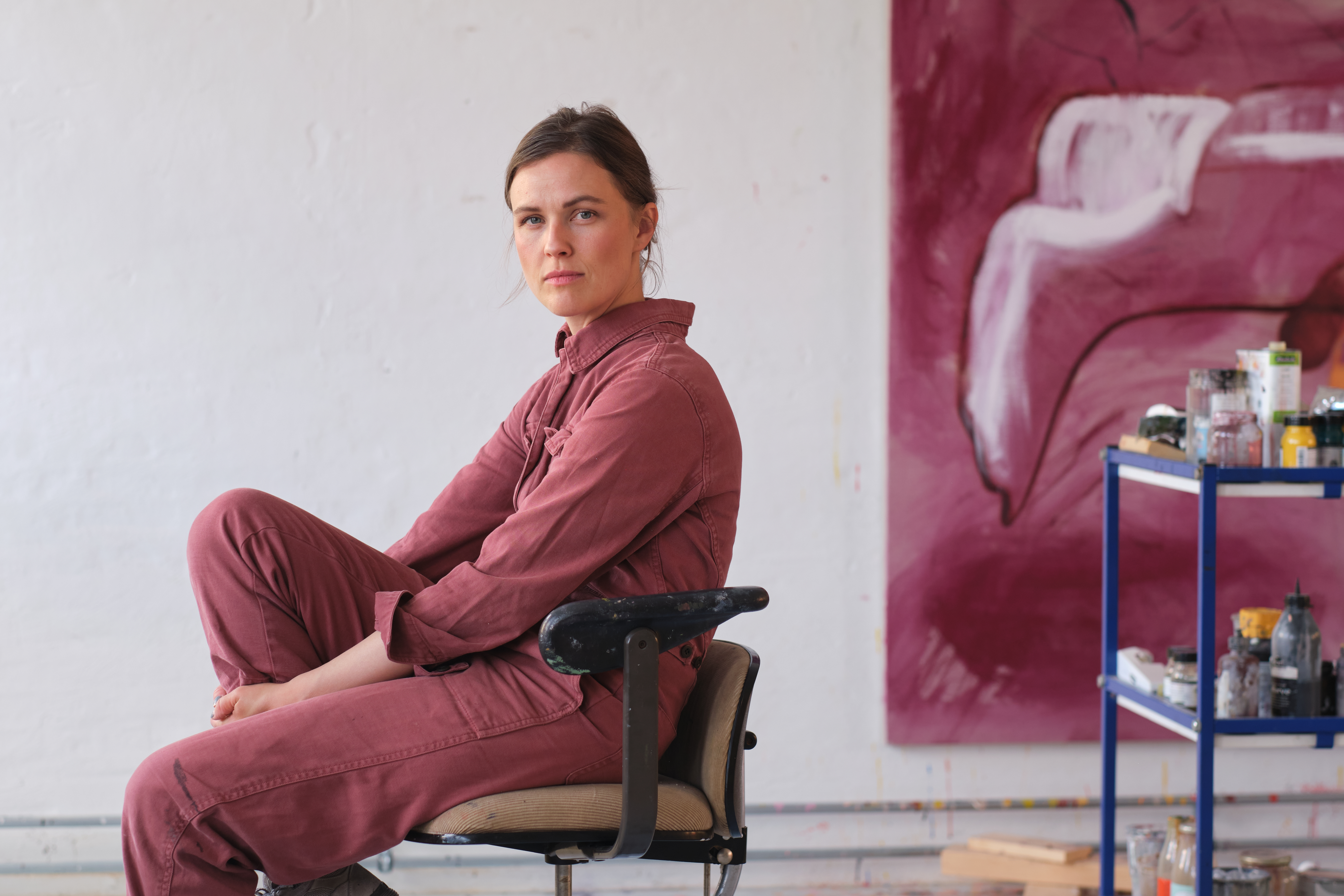
- Born: 1985 (age 40–41); Odense, Denmark
- Education: Funen Art Academy, Kunstakademie Düsseldorf

Emily Gernild (born 1985) is a Danish painter and artist based in Copenhagen, Denmark.

== Life and work ==
Gernild was born 1985 in Odense, Denmark. From 2010 to 2016, she studied fine art at Funen Art Academy and Kunstakademie Düsseldorf where she was taught by Danish artists Tal R and Jens Haaning. Her work is part of the permanent collections of The Danish Arts Foundation, Trapholt Museum for Modern Art, Kastrupgårdsamlingen and The Canica Art Collection.

Gernild's abstract paintings often include compositions of classical still life subjects. Everyday objects such as vegetables, fruits, flowers, plants, seeds, jugs and bottles are recurring motifs. Using dynamic brushstrokes on large canvases, Gernild paints with rabbit-skin glue mixed with pigments along using traditional materials including oil and stick, watercolor, gesso and acrylic.

Her paintings reference 16th century Dutch still life paintings, Edvard Munch’s Symbolism, surrealist dreamlike scenes and draw upon the traditions of female Nordic painters such as Hilma af Klint. In the publication 'Touched - Danish Art in the New Millennium', art critic Maria Kjær Themsen writes that:

Both Anna Ancher, Christine Swane and Anna Syberg are Danish painters who are known for their interior and floral motifs. Gernild adds a far more curved and lively virtuosity to the tradition, where voluminous flowers fill the entire canvas and become abstract. She uses the colors so that they form structures and not just figuration in a very sensuous painting that unites the art historical heritage with the fabulous color of the 00s.

Her solo exhibition ‘Unaffected - Emily Gernild & Christine Swane’ at Rønnebæksholm Museum presented Gernild’s contemporary paintings in dialogue with Christine Swane’s artistic work and her connection to the Funen Painters. A selection of her lithographs were shown alongside works by CoBrA-artist Corneille, Chinese-American artist Walasse Ting and American artist John Chamberlain in the exhibition 'Colour as the driving force' in 2021.

In 2023, her solo exhibition 'Aunts and Dolls' opened at Gammel Holtegaard. Curated by Mai Dengsøe, the exhibition explored the artists family history and consequences of lobotomy in Denmark.

In 2025, the Vigeland Museum in Oslo presented the exhibition 'Feminist Aesthetics', featuring works by the Danish painter Gernild alongside sculptures by Sonja Ferlov Mancoba. The exhibition examined connections between Gernild’s contemporary painting practice and Ferlov Mancoba’s modernist sculpture, with a focus on form, symbolism, and feminist aesthetics. Curator Jarle writes "Both artists move effortlessly between the visual and the intellectual. The visual is the surface – which can sometimes be sufficient. The intellectual reveals itself when the art and the artist consciously – and effortlessly – relate to tradition and give the work an added dimension. This is what creates good art."

She has held solo exhibitions at Schwarz Contemporary in Berlin, M100 Exhibition Space in Odense, Galleri Bo Bjerggaard in Copenhagen and OSL Contemporary on Oslo. Her work has been included in group exhibitions at Arken Museum for Modern Art, Trapholt Museum for Modern Art, Gammel Holtegaard, Rundetaarn, Kastrupgårdsamlingen, Janus Vestjyllands Art Museum and Gammelgaard Art & Culture Museum.

She has created public art commissions for Holbæk Art (2020), the Danish Ministry of Education (2019) and The Maritime and Commercial High Court in Denmark (2012). She received the honorary grant from Niels Wessel Bagge Art Foundation in 2021 and was selected to create the statue Årets Harald by Royal Copenhagen and The University of Copenhagen in 2018.

== Publications ==
- Vibeke Kelding Hansen and Lisbeth Bonde (2019). Upåagtet - Emily Gernild & Christine Swane; Rønnebæksholm Museum. ISBN 9788799992850
- Milena Høgsberg and Grant Klarich Johnson (June 2021). Emily Gernild: Black Lemons. Kerber Verlag. ISBN 978-3-7356-0772-0
- Anna Walter Ed. (2022), Kassandras søstre – fremtidens malere hæver forbandelsen (in Danish). Denmark, Rundetaarn. ISBN 978-87-998290-1-9

== See also ==
- List of Danish women artists
