= Victor Isbrand =

Danish painter

Victor Isbrand (1897 – 1989) was a Danish painter.

== Biography ==
Isbrand was born on 6 July 1897 in Copenhagen. From 1913 to 1917 Isbrand studied at the Academy of Fine Arts in Copenhagen and from 1930 to 1967, he taught drawing at the School of Applied Arts in Copenhagen and influenced young artists and craftsmen, including among others Nanna Ditzel. His style is inspired by the Cubist movement; he painted portraits and urban landscapes as well as watercolors landscapes from the south of France. From 1916 to 1987, his works were exhibited at the Museum of Contemporary Art at the Royal Danish Academy of Fine Arts: Kunsthal Charlottenborg. His best known work is Aphrodite and Eros.

He died 5 March 1989.

== Permanent collections ==
KUNSTEN Museum of Modern Art Aalborg

== Bibliography ==
- Victor Isbrand: And Udvalg Billeder af , 1937
- Victor Isbrand: Victor Isbrand maler og pdagog , 1987
- A Dalskov: i Vejledning Havebrug, 1919
- Birgitte Hasle: af Vignet Venedig, 1957
- Andreas Lund-Drosvad: Gourmanden Gaba; grnlandske Sagn Skitser og, 1937.
