= Thyra Manicus-Hansen =

Danish ceramist and trade unionist (1872–1954)

Thyra Beate Christiane Manicus-Hansen (7 September 1872 – 29 August 1954) was a Danish ceramist and trade unionist. As head of the Keramisk Malerforening (Ceramic Painters Union), she successfully pressed for better pay and working conditions for those working as artists in Den Kongelige Porcelainsfabrik and Bing & Grøndahl porcelain factories. She also campaigned internationally for women's rights.

== Biography ==
Born in Vladivostok, Russia, on 7 September 1872, Thyra Beate Christiane Manicus-Hansen was the daughter of the telegraph manager Emil Anton Hansen (1827-1906) and Helene Mathilde Manicus (1840-1929). At the time of her birth, the family happened to be in Vladivostok where her father represented the Store Nordiske Telegrafselskab. He and the family later moved to France and England where Manicus-Hansen was brought up. On her father's retirement in 1892, the family finally settled in Copenhagen.

In 1898, Manicus-Hansen was employed as one of the many painters at the Kongelige Porcelainsfabrik. She lived with her sister Xiane who also worked there. Despite the fact that the porcelain they decorated was produced for the royal houses of Europe, the salaries were extremely low. When the management failed to respond to their requests for improved wages, in 1905 they decided to club together, forming the trades union known as the Keramisk Malerforening, with some 80 members from the Kongelige Porcelainsfabrik and from Bing & Grøndahl. Manicus-Hansen headed the union. After a conflict, she was fired but 40 of her colleagues went on strike. The firm's management finally relented and the women were all re-engaged. Manicus-Hansen remained president of the union until 1934 and worked at the porcelain factory until 1936 when she retired on grounds of poor health. From 1909 to 1934, she was also a member of the management committee of Keramisk Forbund which she represented at the 1909 congress of the French ceramic union.

With the threat of World War I, Manicus-Hansen also campaigned for the peace movement. She attended the international women's peace conference in The Hague in 1915, together with other Danish activists including Clara Tybjerg, Thora Daugaard and Andrea Brochmann. She went on to establish the Danish branch of what became the Women's International League for Peace and Freedon.

Thyra Manicus-Hansen died in Copenhagen on 29 August 1954. She is buried in the Assistens Cemetery.
