= Helene Moltke-Leth =

Danish director and filmmaker

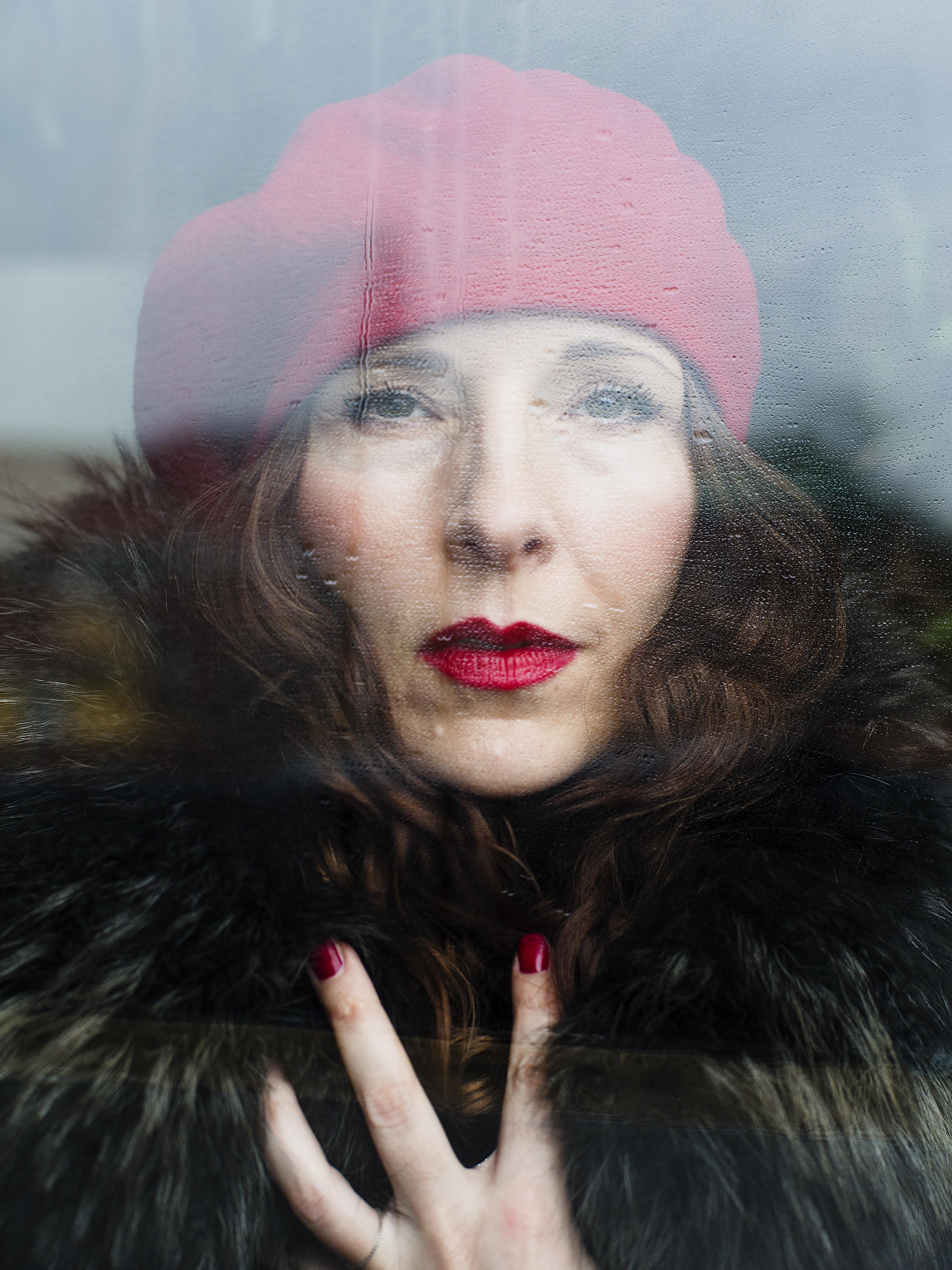
- Born: 1973 (age 52–53)
- Education: National Film School of Denmark (2001-2005)

Helene Moltke-Leth (born 1973) is a Danish film director, artist, and DJ, working across film, photography, sound, music and fine art. Her work has been shown at many galleries, museums and international film, art, and poetry festivals, and she has received international film awards. She is especially known for her films Running Through Life (2015) and I C (2022).

== Early life ==
Helene Moltke-Leth was born in 1973 in Copenhagen, Denmark.

== Career ==
Moltke-Leth has become known as a film director, artist, and DJ, working across film, photography, sound, music and fine art.

In the 1990s, she worked as a DJ, radio and TV presenter for The Danish Broadcasting Corporation and TV2 Denmark, hosting the music programs P3 GO!, Uland and Puls. She interviewed electronic DJs and artists such as Underworld, Prodigy, The Chemical Brothers, Moby, DJ Sneak, Kenny Larkin, David Holmes, Matthew Herbert, Patrick Pulsinger and Erdem Tunika. In 1996 she co-founded the nightclub Klub Vega.

In 2005 she graduated from National Film School of Denmark.

Her work within music and poetry includes the documentary Underworld about the British electronic music group Underworld's Beaucoup Fish tour, and the documentary about Roskilde Festival, titled Roskilde, which she co-directed with Ulrik Wivel. Her music documentary ”Same Old Song” follows three Danish musicians, Tue Track, Mikkel Hess and Joy Morgan, who created a love song while exploring what it meant to be single at the start of the millennium.

In 2006 she made five short poetry films with Danish poets Mette Moestrup, Maja Lee Langvad, Hans Lucht, Marie Mamonia, and Lasse Thorning, which was broadcast on The Danish Broadcasting Corporation and presented at several Nordic film festivals.

In 2007, she received the Best Short Fiction Award at Odense international Film Festival for the short poetry film Sporenstregs featuring Danish poet Lasse Thorning.

Her short poetry film Beyond Words received the Special Merit award at the Faces of Wisdom Short Film Competition in 2014.

In 2015, she created the short poetry film Running Through Life. It received six international awards in Asia, the US, and Europe, including Best Short Award (Minister's Award, the Ministry of Environment) and the J-WAVE Award at Short Shorts Film Festival & Asia, Japan, 2016, and the Next Great Filmmaker Award at Berkshire International Film Festival in 2017. Running Through Life was also shown at the opening of the sustainability conference Copenhagen Fashion Summit in 2016. The film was a meditation on the limitations of modern society.

In 2022, her short climate art film I C received the Best Experimental Film Award at Manchester Film Festival. She was in 2022 jury member for the 60Seconds Festival, celebrating silent artistic films in public spaces.

Her first solo exhibition, Who or What is God Now?, was shown at DGI-byen in Copenhagen, and included eight abstract photographs of nature that portrayed fragments of the rainbow. The exhibition addressed the symbolism of the rainbow and was a comment on climate change.

In December 2022, she released the music and video work "European Silk Road" in collaboration with Hess Is More and Josephine Philip. In 2023, the music track was remixed by Matthew Herbert and Sorenious Bonk.

Earlier in her career she worked within portrait documentaries, and directed I Danmark, dér hører jeg hjemme, which portrayed the life of Isi Foighel, former Danish minister and judge at the European Court of Human Rights. She directed the TV-documentary ”Opgøret med fortiden” and six episodes of the TV-documentary series ”Meningen med livet og andre småting” with key figures part of the Danish intellectual elite: Jokum Rohde, Ursula Andkjær Olsen, Søren Ulrik Thomsen, Niels Grønkjær, Casten Jensen, Katrine Wiedemann, Katrine Gislinge, Thierry Geoffroy, Per Aage Brandt, Puk Damsgård og Dy Plambeck. She created ten short films featuring key players in the Danish fashion industry in 2007. The films were shown on large outdoor screens around the city during Copenhagen Fashion Week, and included interviews with Naja Lauf, E-Types, Diana Brinks, Designers Remix, Ole Yde, Day Birger et Mikkelsen, Gestuz, Unique Models, Dyrberg/Kern and Kaffe Clothing. In 2022 she collaborated with fashion designer Henrik Vibskov on the short poetry film ‘Bibliotheca of Micro Selves’ which was shown at Paris Fashion Week.

== Recognition and awards ==
Moltke-Leth's work has been shown at galleries, museums and international film, art, and poetry festivals, including Tokyo Photographic Art Museum, Ann Arbor Film Festival, Berkshire International Film Festival, Copenhagen International Documentary Film Festival. and Odense International Film Festival.

=== Awards ===
Moltke-Leth has been nominated for several awards and she has received twelve international awards:

- I C, Best International Film Award, Paris Film Art Festival, France, November 2024
- I C, Best Experimental Film, Montreal Independent Film Festival, Canada, March 2023
- I C, Best Environmental Film, Montreal Independent Film Festival, Canada, March 2023
- I C, Best Experimental Short Film, Izmit International Short Film Festival (IISFF), Turkey, November 2022
- I C, Best Experimental Film, Manchester Film Festival, United Kingdom, 2022.
- Running Through Life, The Next Great Filmmaker Award, Berkshire International Film Festival, US, 2017.
- Running Through Life, Best Experimental Film, Manchester Film Festival, United Kingdom, 2017.
- Running Through Life, The Audience Award, Be a Better Being, Germany, 2016.
- Running Through Life, International Public's Selection Award, Festival Silêncio, Portugal, 2016.
- Running Through Life, Best Short Award (Minister's Award, the Ministry of Environment), Short Shorts Film Festival & Asia, Japan, 2016.
- Running Through Life, J-WAVE Award, Short Shorts Film Festival & Asia 2016, Japan, 2016.
- ‘Beyond Words’, Special Merits, Faces of Wisdom Film, 2014.
- ‘Sporenstregs’, Best Danish Short Fiction, Odense International Film Festival, Denmark, 2007.

== See also ==
- List of Danish artists
- Vimeo trailers - Helene Moltke-Leth
