= Birte Stenbak =

Danish goldsmith and jeweller

Birte Stenbak née Jensen (born 1938) is a Danish goldsmith and jeweller. After an apprenticeship with Poul Bang in the 1950s, she worked in Bent Stålgård's workshop. In 1975, together with her friend Birthe Jørgensen, she established a studio and shop in central Copenhagen, where she created imaginative jewellery consisting of gemstones, silver, gold, pearls and other materials. From 1983, she ran the business alone in what became known as Aladdin's Cave. Collaborating with the artist Tage Andersen, in 1988 she created a large table decoration for Rosenborg Castle. Since the mid-1970s, her work has been exhibited at home and abroad.

== Biography ==
Born on 10 February 1938 in Roskilde, she was the daughter of the antiques dealer Arnold Jensen (1911–1987) and his wife Henny Marie, née Bøgeholdt. On 19 August 1960, she married the schoolteacher Erik S. Pedersen, with whom she had a son, Jesper, in 1964. The marriage was dissolved in 1972. As a young woman, she was exceptionally energetic, engaging in car racing with her brother and hiking in the Himalayas.

In 1954, she began an apprenticeship with the silversmith Poul Bang. On completing her training in 1959, she was awarded the silver medal for her competence as an artisan. She then worked as a jeweller with Bent Stålgård until 1972, after which she took a two-year course in experimental design at the Goldsmiths' College in Copenhagen (1973–75). While there, she was a co-founder of the creative group known as May Be, which exhibited at the Gammel Strand Gallery.

In 1975, together with her friend Birthe Jörgensen, she established B & B, a studio and shop in Copenhagen's Gothersgade, opposite Rosenborg Have. Although the two worked in quite different styles, they complemented each other, Jørgensen adopting a more traditional approach while Stenbak created far more exotic and imaginative pieces. In 1983, Jørgensen left the partnership to participate in her family's hotel business, leaving Stenbak to run the business alone until 1996. Her shop became generally known as Aladdins Hule or Aladdin's Cave. In the 1980s, she collaborated with the flower-painting artist Tage Andersen, exhibiting her work in his shop on Kongens Nytorv. In 1988, the two created a table decoration for Rosenborg Castle in connection with an exhibition related to King Christian IV.

Stenbak has exhibited at Denmark's Design Museum, the Geological Museum, Rosenborg Castle, Marienlyst Castle and Antwerp's Diamond Museum.
