= Elizabeth Romhild =

- Born: 15 October 1960 (age 65); Copenhagen, Denmark
- Known for: Painter, sculptor, designer

Elizabeth Romhild (15 October 1960, Copenhagen, Denmark) is a Bangkok-based Danish-Armenian painter, sculptor, designer.

== Biography ==
Elizabeth Romhild was born in Denmark in the family of Armenian father and Danish mother. She spent her childhood in Iran. She went to school in England, lived in Saudi Arabia, the United States, Indonesia, in 1988 she settled in Thailand.

Elizabeth is a self-taught artist. At the age of 26 she started to paint realistic portraits, then seascapes, landscapes. The hero of Elizabeth's classic and modern works is a woman with her conscious and subconscious feelings and emotions.

Elizabeth Romhild works are in private collections in Denmark, Germany, Switzerland, Netherlands, Italy, Thailand, Indonesia, Singapore, Hong Kong, Australia and in the US.

Since 1986 she participated in various solo and group exhibitions in Indonesia, Thailand, Denmark, London, Switzerland, Singapore, Italy, United States.

Elizabeth did UTOPIA for the international Bangkok Elephant Parade, which was auctioned by Christies and her elephant got the highest bid.

== Exhibitions ==
- Indonesia, 1986
  - "Yayasan Mitra Budaya Indonesia" Jakarta.
  - Water colour exhibition at Kalista Gallery, Jakarta
  - "Exposisi Cat Air 86" Mitra Budaya, Jakarta.
- Indonesia, 1988
  - First One Woman Show in Oils at Duta Fine Arts Gallery.
- Thailand, 1996
  - "Depth of Feelings" One Woman Show of Oils and Sketches.
- Thailand, 1997
  - The Grand Hyatt Erawan, Bangkok, coincided with the visit to Thailand of H.R.H. Crown Prince Frederik of Denmark.
  - Sheraton Grande, Bangkok, Solo Exhibition "Women & Oranges", a new collection of mildly erotic art.
  - International Visual Art Exhibition at Srinakharinwirot University, Bangkok.
  - Collection of Oil paintings at Carpediem Gallery, Bangkok.
- Thailand, 1998
  - "Women Carnival" solo exhibition at Pacific City Club, Bangkok.
  - Group exhibition at Kuppa, Bangkok.
  - "Looking Back" a retrospect of all to-date work at 2 Oceans 23 Gallery, Bangkok.
- Denmark
  - "Sensualitet i farver" solo exhibition at Ebeltoft Kunstforening Gallery.
- Thailand, 1999
  - "Oriental Mystic", exhibition of inks at 2 Oceans 23, Bangkok.
  - December Group Show at 2 Oceans 23, Bangkok.
- Denmark
  - Exhibition of drawings at Gallery Babette, Ebeltoft.
- Thailand, 2000
  - "Women & Sensuality" solo exhibition at Pacific City Club, Bangkok.
- Denmark
  - "Elizabeth's Exotic World" solo exhibition at Galerie Knud Grothe, Copenhagen.
- Thailand, 2001
  - Preview solo exhibition of latest works at Pacific City Club, Bangkok.
- Denmark
  - "Seduction" solo exhibition of oil paintings at Ebeltoft Kunstforening Gallery in connection with the city's 700-year celebration.
- England, 2002
  - Valentine Show at Bloxham Galleries, London.
- Thailand
  - "Fever" solo exhibition at H Gallery, Bangkok.
- Denmark
  - "Forbidden Fruit" solo exhibition at Galerie Knud Grothe, Copenhagen.
- Thailand, 2003
  - "Passion Play" solo exhibition at H Gallery, Bangkok
- Switzerland, 2004
  - "Impromptu" solo exhibition at Palace Hotel, Gstaad.
  - Exhibition at Gallery Delio Romang, Gstaad.
  - Exhibition at Gallery Delio Romang, Lugano.
- Thailand
  - "Bliss" solo exhibition at H Gallery, Bangkok.
- Denmark
  - Solo exhibition at Galerie Knud Grothe, Copenhagen.
- Singapore
  - "Trail of the East" exhibition at Opera Gallery.
- Hong Kong, 2005
  - Exhibition at Opera Gallery.
- Singapore
  - Exhibition at Opera Gallery.
- Thailand, 2006
  - "Cynosure" solo exhibition at H Gallery, Bangkok
- Denmark
  - "Temptress" solo exhibition at Galerie Knud Grothe, Copenhagen
- Denmark, 2007
  - "ALLURE" solo exhibition at Galleri Soto, Aalborg
- Denmark, 2008
  - "DAWN" Solo exhibition at Galerie Knud, Grothe, Copenhagen
- Denmark Solo exhibition at Ebeltoft Kunst Forening, Ebeltoft, 2009
- Denmark Solo exhibition at Fredericia Kunst Forening, Fredericia
- Denmark "Kunst For Alvor" at Paradehuset Frederiksberg, Copenhagen
- Denmark "Elizabeth Romhild Other Spirit" solo exhibition at Gallery Clifford, Vejle
- Italy Florence Biennale Internazionale dell'arte Contemporanea, Florence, 2010
- Thailand "Wild & Whimsical" Solo exhibition at La Lanta Gallery
- USA The affordable art fair, New York City (represented by La Lanta Gallery)
- Denmark "EROS" Solo exhibition at Galerie Knud Grothe, Copenhagen
- Thailand, 2011
  - "As Eye Am" Solo exhibition at La Lanta Gallery
- Denmark, 2012
  - "Eye Catching" Solo exhibition at Galerie Knud Grothe, Copenhagen
- Thailand, 2013
  - "Art in the Ninth Reign" – Group Exhibition at Bangkok Art and Culture Centre, Thailand
  - "Parallel" Exhibition at La Lanta Fine Art Gallery, Bangkok
- Thailand 2015
  - MUSE at Rooftop Farmani Gallery, Bangkok
