= Nanna Lysholt Hansen =

Performance artist, curator, and teacher

Nanna Lysholt Hansen is a performance artist, curator and teacher from Copenhagen, Denmark. She received her MFA at the Royal Danish Academy of Fine Arts. She got her BFA degree in 2005 at Kingston University in London, UK. She also studied at The Central Academy of Fine Art in Beijing, China in 2010. Hansen founded NLHspace, an artist-run center in Copenhagen in 2006. Her artistic practice is concerned with the body, memory, history, playback technology and architecture.

She has exhibited internationally at Fotografisk Center in Denmark, The Saint-Valentin Espace d’Art in China, The Bristol Biennial of Contemporary Art in the U.K. and GOLD & BETON in Germany and the Pratt Manhattan Gallery in the United States and Kunsthal Charlottenborg, Nikolaj Contemporary Art Center.
