= Hedvig Collin =

Danish painter, illustrator and writer

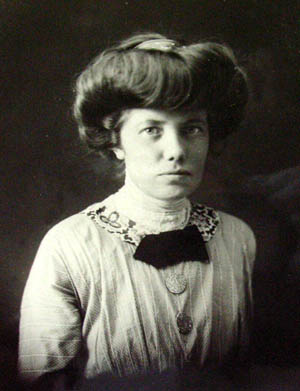
Hedvig Collin

Hedvig Jacobine Henriette Collin (27 May 1880 – 2 April 1964) was a Danish painter, illustrator and writer. She created both portraits and landscapes but she is remembered above all for illustrating books for children. In addition to her illustrations in many Danish publications for young people, she wrote and illustrated a number of works in English, including Two Viking Boys (1949) and Young Hans Christian Andersen (1955).

== Biography ==
Born on 27 May 1880 in Nakskov, Hedvig Jacobine Henriette Collin was the daughter of the photographer Alfred Theodor Collin (1849–1922) and Ottilia Frederikke Christiane née Bloch (1850–1935). She attended Copenhagen's Arts and Crafts School for Women before becoming a student in the women's section of the Royal Danish Academy of Fine Arts where she befriended Karen Blixen. After graduating from the Academy's decoration school in 1909, she furthered her education at the École des Beaux-Arts in Paris and at the Kunstgewerbeschule in Berlin.

Taking a general interest in culture and design, during her first trip to Paris in 1904, Collin wrote articles for the magazine Vore Damer, illustrated with her own photographs. In the 1920s and 1930s, she travelled to Italy, Greece, Poland, Germany and England. She spent the years of the Second World War in the United States. In addition to exhibiting her works in Denmark, she participated in the Salon des humoristes in Paris (c. 1913). At the end of the war, she held a solo exhibition of her books, illustrations and paintings in Reykjavík.

Collin is remembered above all for her illustrations. From 1916 to 1922, together with her colleagues, she published the illustrated song books for children in the Vore Børnesange series. Other illustrated works included the humorous geography of Denmark titled Bibi (1929) and books she both wrote and illustrated for the American market such as Two Viking Boys (1949) and Young Hans Christian Andersen (1955). She was also active designing a multitude of postcards from 1907 to 1931.

Hedvig Collin died in Lyngby on 2 April 1964 and is buried in Søllerød.
