= Esther Gehlin =

Danish-Swedish painter (1892–1949)

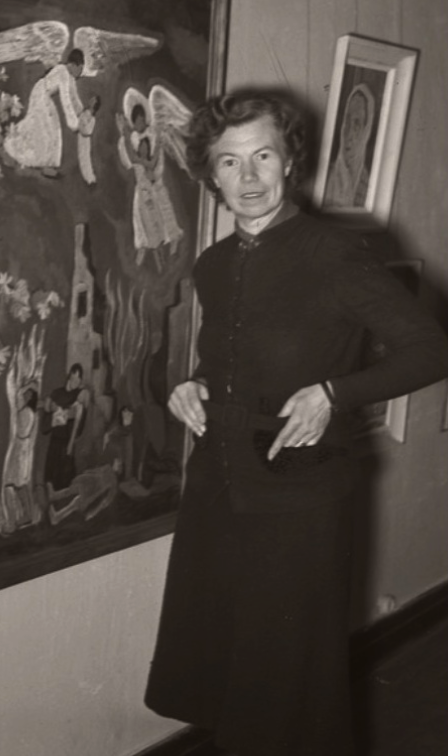
Esther Gehlin (1940)

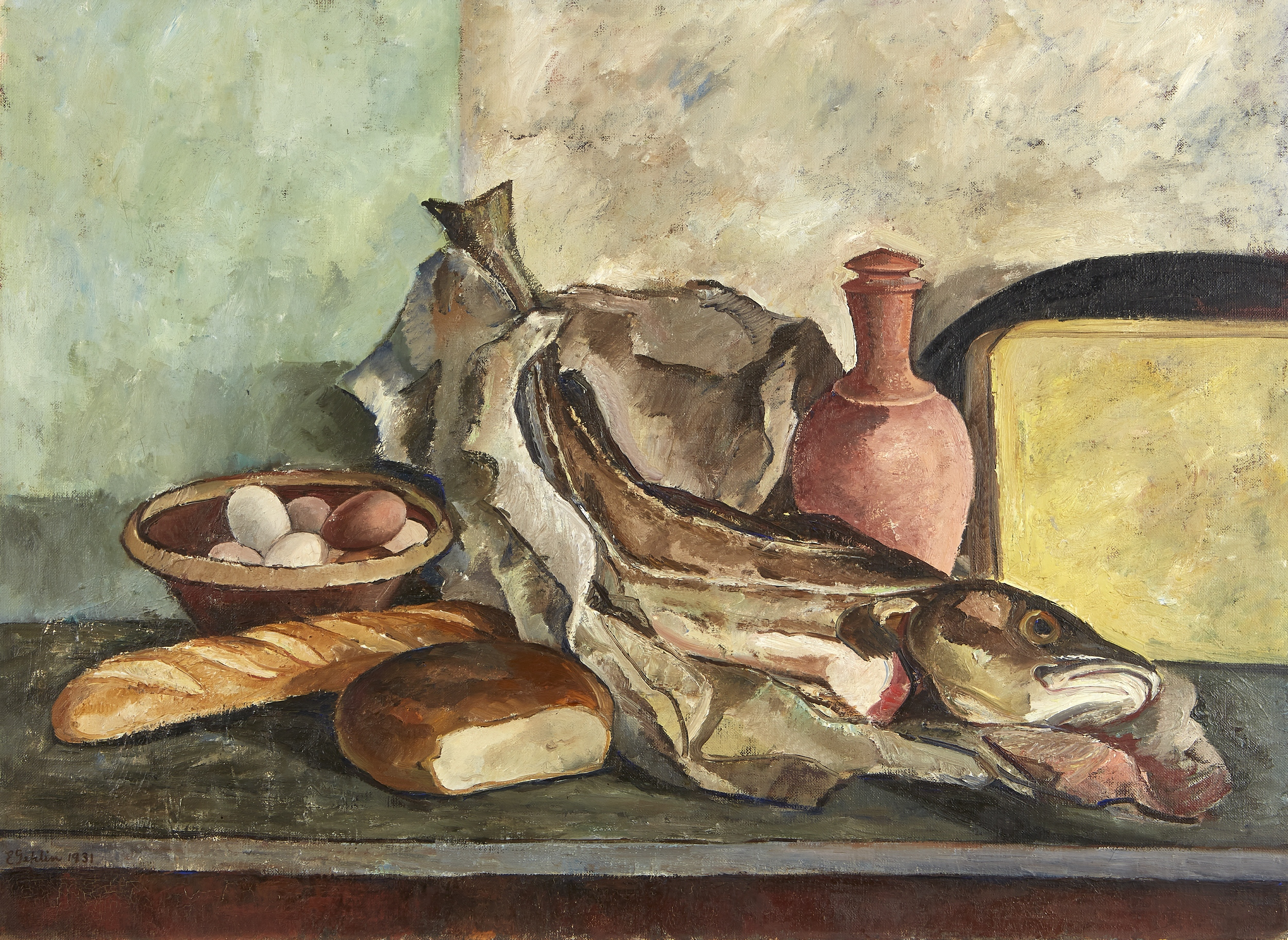
Gehlin's Still life with cod and bread (1931)

Esther Gehlin née Henriques (1892–1949) was a Danish-Swedish painter of Jewish descent whose water colours and oils include still lifes, interiors, portraits and landscapes. From 1922, she and her artist husband Hugo Gehlin settled in the Swedish town of Helsingborg where local artists and writers frequently gathered in their home. In the 1940s, she created textile appliqués inspired by early Christian art.

== Biography ==
Born in the Frederiksberg district of Copenhagen on 24 March 1892, Esther Henriques was the daughter of the factory director Michael Emil Martin Henriques and Julie Christiane Poulsen. Thanks to her father's success in producing knitted products, she was brought up in a well-to-do middle-class Jewish home. After attending The Technical Institute from 1908, she was admitted to the Royal Danish Academy of Fine Arts in 1911, graduating in 1915.

Gehlin married the Swedish painter Hugo Gehlin (1889–1953) in June 1917. In 1920, they spent a year in Italy visiting cities such as Assisi and Ravenna on a study trip. On their return, they held a joint exhibition at Stockholm's Gummeson Gallery. In 1922 they settled in Helsingborg, first in Raus and from 1925 in a house on St Clemens gata which became a venue for local artists, writers and actors to socialize.

For many years, Gehlin painted in water colours and oils, creating portraits, still lifes and landscapes, the latter inspired by views from her home which overlooked the city's port, houses and gardens. Her work attracted generally favourable reviews, especially her still lifes. The same was true of her textile appliqués which she created from the late 1930s. Works by Esther Gehlin can be seen at the Nationalmuseum, Moderna Museet, Malmö Art Museum and in Helsingborg's museums. A retrospective was held at Helsingborg's Vikingsberg Art Museum in 1952, the year Gehlin would have turned 60.

Esther Gehlin died on 23 October 1949 in Helsingborg where she is buried in the Raus Cemetery.
