= Sara Mathilde Øster =

Danish artist

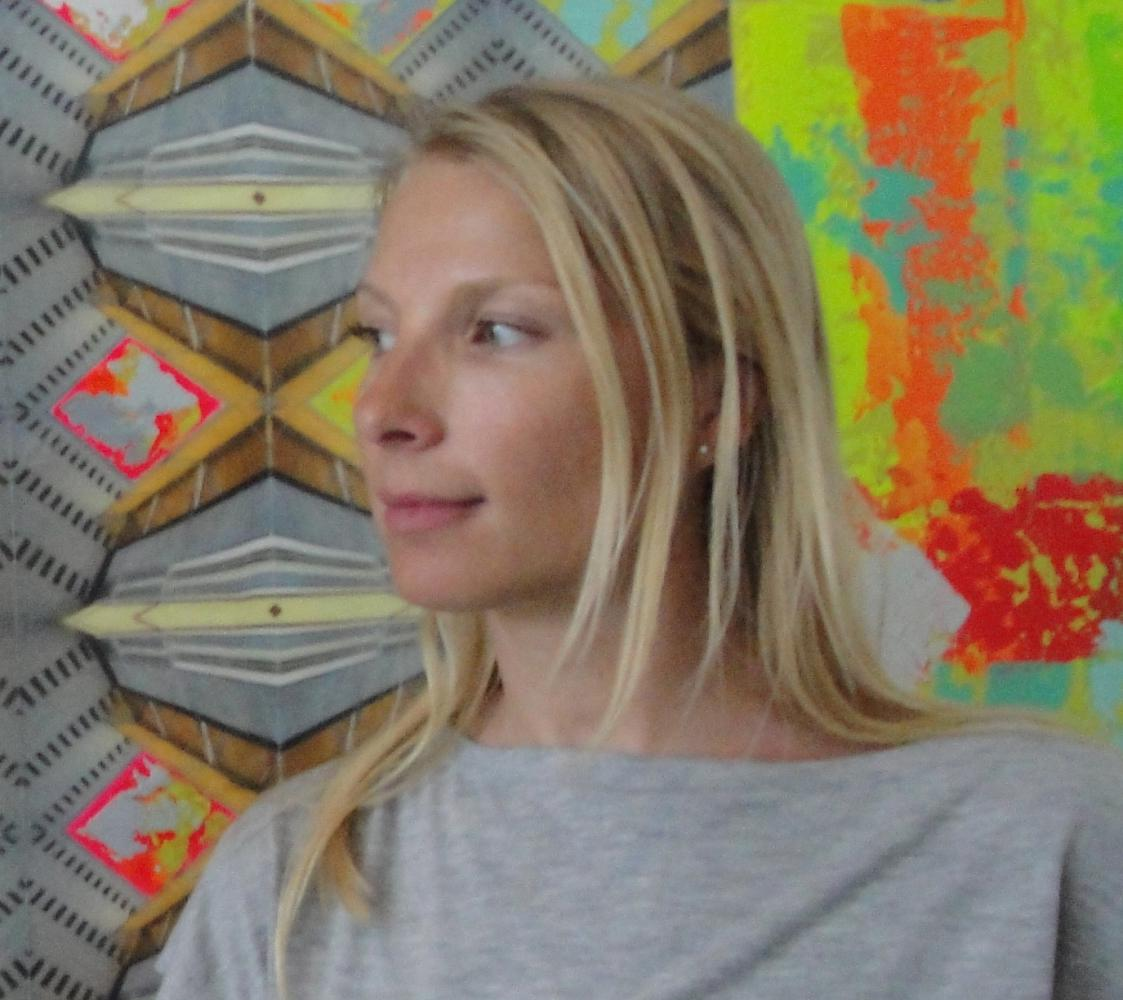
Sara Mathilde Øster

Sara Mathilde Øster (born 21 September 1973 in Copenhagen) is a Danish artist.

Sara Mathilde Øster graduated from the University of the Arts London and debuted at Charlottenborg Spring Exhibition in 2009. She has among other places had exhibitions at Fuglsanghus, Hørsholm, and Cobra-rummet at Sophienholm.

She has undertaken two major public commissions, LuxLapis for Gladsaxe Gymnasium (2011) and SolarisMontium for Kastanjehaven nursing home, Frederiksberg.

Sara Mathilde Øster is featured in the book 101 Artists (2011) by Tom Jørgensen
