= Kirsten Ortwed =

Danish artist

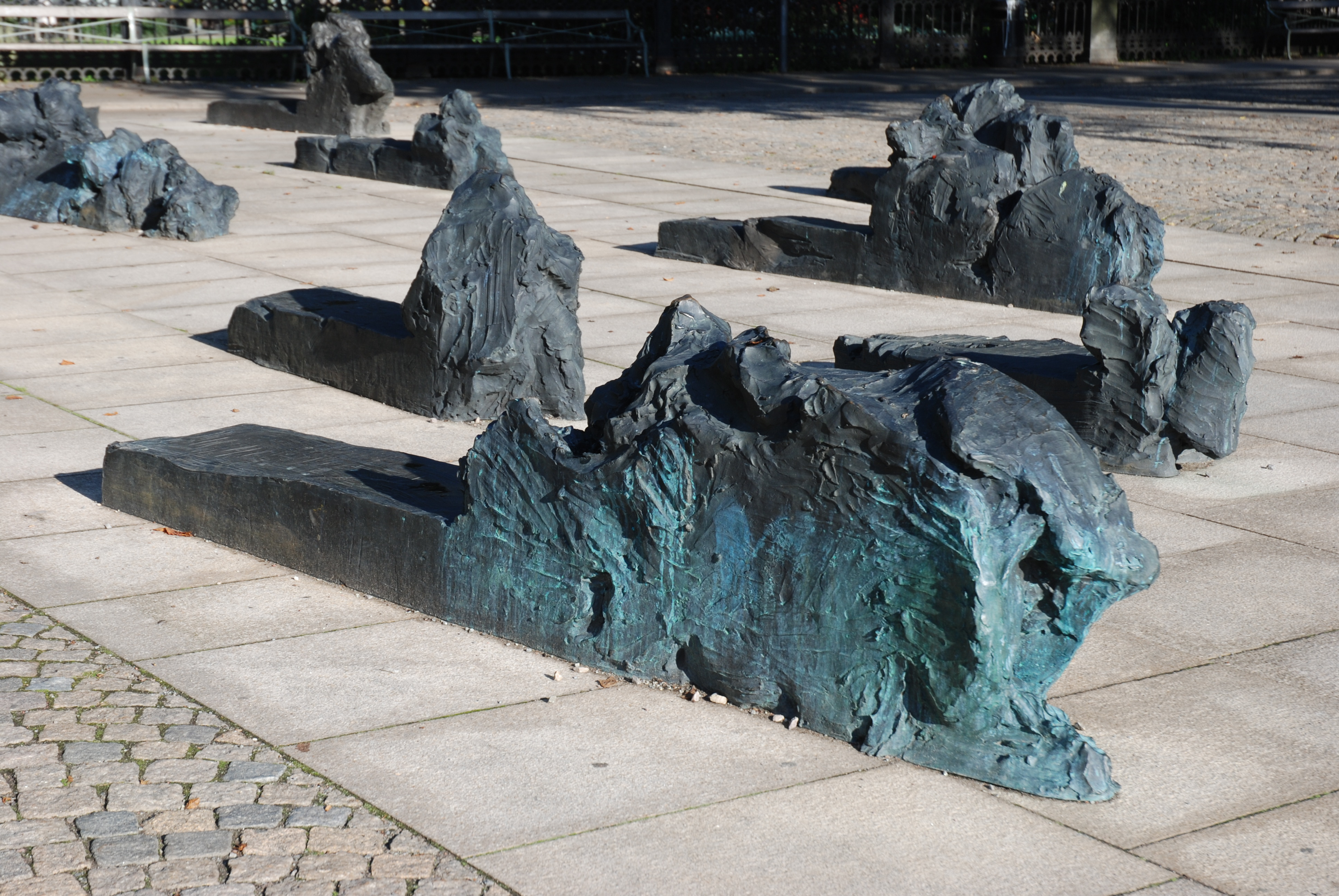
Kirsten Ortwed: Raoul Wallenberg Monument, Stockholm (2001)

Kirsten Møller Ortwed (born 28 May 1948) is a Danish artist, now based in Cologne, Germany. She is noted for her striking sculptures in public spaces and her sometimes surprising combinations of traditional and unconventional materials.

== Early life ==
Born in Virum, she began to paint when she was 13 and hoped to study at the Academy but her parents did not agree. In 1965, she travelled around Europe alone. On her return, she became interested in the avant-garde movement in Copenhagen. In 1967, she turned to weaving and textile art, studying first under John Becker (1915–1986), then from 1969 as an apprentice with Naja Salto (born 1945). After debuting at Kunstnernes Efterårsudstilling in 1970, she studied painting at the Royal Danish Academy of Fine Arts (1970–75) where she appreciated the help and encouragement she received from the German fluxus artist, Arthur Køpcke (1928-1977).

== Career ==
After a study trip to New York in 1976, Ortwed travelled to Mexico, Morocco and Egypt. Unhappy with the art scene in Denmark, in 1982 she moved to Cologne, Germany. In 1996, with her partner Troels Wörsel, she began to work in Pietrasanta in Tuscany, located next to the large marble quarry, now specializing in sculpture.

She created large works consisting of several sections which often spread out horizontally like islands in space without any symbolic or ideological traits. Instead they can be seen as giving shape to absence and presence or contrasting lightness and heaviness. She frequently makes use of unconventional materials such as prefabricated sections or moulded parts as well as bronze and plaster. Her use of unpredictable materials contributes to her desire to express relationships between shape and space, often veering towards openness as in her Blind Date (1996), Risks Run (1994) and Einfluss (1991).

In 1997, Ortwed represented Denmark at the Venice Biennale with her extensive work Tons of Circumstances supported by Hermod Lannungs Museumsfond. The following year, she won the competition for creating a monument in memory of Raoul Wallenberg in Stockholm. Ortwed's works have been presented at numerous solo exhibitions in Scandinavia, Germany, France and the United States. She was awarded the Eckersberg Medal in 1994 by the Royal Danish Academy of Fine Arts.

== Selected works ==
=== Public art ===
- Brønden, Aars, Denmark (1995–96)
- Ædeltårnet, Kirketorvet, Aars, Denmark (1995–96)
- Raoul Wallenberg Monument, Stockholm, Sweden (2001)
- Terra Vento, Clarion Hotel, Ringvägen, Stockholm (2003)
- Stene til gårdrum, Frederiksberg Gymnasium, Copenhagen, Denmark (2000–04)
- Syntax, Sölvegatan, Lund University, Lund, Sweden (2000–04)
- Sektion, Lund University, Lund, Sweden (2000–04)
- Platform, East Jutland State Prison, Horsens, Denmark (2004–06)
- Beringsøen , Kirketorvet, Horsens, Denmark (2007)
- Full Length, Havnegade, Copenhagen, Denmark (2016)
- 14–7–2006, Nesparken, Moss, Norway (2016)

=== In museums ===
- Full length, Statens Museum for Kunst, Copenhagen, Denmark (2006–08)

== Awards ==
In 1995, Ortwed was awarded the Eckersberg Medal and, in 2002, the Thorvaldsen Medal.
