= Tina Enghoff =

Danish photographer, video artist, and writer

Tina Enghoff (born 1957) is a Danish photographer, video artist, and writer, based in Copenhagen. She studied at The Graphic College of Denmark before graduating from the International Center of Photography (ICP), New York, in 1981.

Enghoff's artistic practice is socially engaged and centered around community and collaborative projects in which artistic activism underpins strategies of collective action, listening, resistance and care. Often, she examines how narrative structures shape our perception of reality. Enghoff's art projects offer original and productive negotiations of questions of representation and visibility. She works forensically to extract fresh perspectives on past or present histories and situations to re-evaluate Nordic colonialism, and give voice to the marginalised and disenfranchised.

== Projects ==
Read Tina Enghoff's reflections on some of her own work, from the "Global Challenges" Symposium during the Danish Photo Biennale 2016: "The Need for Collaboration".

=== Art Projects ===
- The Sixteen Seeds Library (2026): The artwork consists of 250 blue books in varying shades, suspended from the ceiling and accessible through digital presentations. The books are filled during the exhibition Wipe All Traces (2026 - 2027) at Skissernas Museum, through collaborative workshops with people who have experienced displacement.
- Geography of Violence (2026): This series of sculptures highlights brings together casts and photographs from locations in Sweden where attacks or arson, targeting asylum accommodation centres, took place in 2015–2016. Thus, it preserves traces and events otherwise consigned to oblivion. The project was developed parallel withThe Sixteen Seeds Library and is part of a research collaboration with Erika Larsson, a researcher at Skissernas Museum and the Department of Cultural Studies at Lund University. The research project explores how artistic processes and methods can contribute to healing, inclusion, and social change.
- In The Past We Made History, (2025): In 2015, Europe experienced a large refugee and migration crisis, with over one million people seeking refuge. In the Past We Made History consists of oral stories, photography, photogrammetry, and film installations, interspersed with large tapestries. It is a cultural investigation in the form of a living archive and focuses on strategies of remembering and bearing witness, in the fringes of collective memory or official history writing. Made in collaboration with Kent Klich and Anastasija (Nastija) Kiake and 22 People/Danes with refugee experience.
- Displaced, (2020) is based on research, site-specific art activism, outreach and local collaborations in Greenland, and examines the role of archives in relation to personal history. The research presents two parallel worlds of David: His childhood memories of his stay in Denmark in the beginning of the 1950s, oral history, and written statements about him and Nanortalik (his place of birth) found in the Danish archives. Displaced is investigating postcolonial identity and speaks of what happens when you are severed from your roots, the loss of belonging and language - but also of regaining or reclaiming ownership and agency.
- Hate Is, (2016), is a photo project focusing on hate crimes in eight police districts in Denmark. It consists of large black and white images from specific crime scenes that refer to a police report and a file number.
- Isolation, (2016): Photographs of notes posted by prison guards on the doors of the seven solitary confinement cells at Ringe State Prison in Denmark. Every time a prisoner leaves solitary confinement a prison guard writes a report on the condition of the cell. Made in collaboration with former prison chaplain Kamille Nygård.
- Seven Years, (2010): A video-, photo- and book project focusing on an overlooked and neglected community of migrant women who came to Denmark through the Danish family reunification programme, and subsequently suffered physically or psychologically abuse at the hands of their husbands (Danish citizens). At the time, immigrants could apply for permanent residency after seven years. The women who participated in the project did not have a residency permit of their own, and were thus left without access to the social rights and liberties of permanent residents.
- Migrant Documents, (2013), is a collaborative photo- and video project depicting the illegal everyday life and harsh realities of undocumented immigrants in an otherwise closely controlled, registered and regulated Scandinavian country. We only meet the people either seen from behind or as hardly identifiable, grainy contours in the night surveillance stills; the majority of photographs are either belongings, objects or even blood samples pointing towards the individual or the surroundings as seen through their eyes.
- Dogwalk, (2008): The Dogwalk project and book focused on homelessness. It traces the path between Copenhagen Central Station and the homeless shelter, Heaven Express (DK: Himmelekspressen) that Enghoff walked and observed from 16 May to 1 June in 2008. On that stretch of public urban space she found more than just a collection of buildings; it is a unique social environment and strongly coded space where territories between different sections of the population are constantly being negotiated.
- Possible Relatives, (2002-2004), is a photo-, video- and installation project, a book and an exhibition focusing on loneliness. The point of departure for this project were the statutory notices published in newspapers by public authorities in their search for Possible Relatives to people who have died a lonely and isolated death, mostly in their own homes, without any contact to family or friends. Enghoff documented the homes of the deceased, some of whom had not been discovered for decades.

=== Community and outreach projects ===
- 2025 Mapping Boden, Arthall Havremagasinet, Boden, Sweden
- 2024 – 2025 community involvement around In the Past We Made History
- 2022 Come Sit In Your Cell and the Cell Will Tell You Everything, prisons workshops in scandinavien prisons.
- 2015 – 2022 Siunissaq, community art projects in Greenland
- 2019 – 2021 Art and Social Communities, Danish Arts Foundation, Arts Council Norway and Ilisimatusarfik/University of Greenland
- 2017 – 2019 Time, Place, Room, Arts Council Norway and The National Photomuseum Norway
- 2018 – 2019 Travelog – KØS Museum of Art in Public Spaces, Denmark
- 2018 – 2019 Part of History – Danish Arts Foundation, Gentofte Municipality, Denmark
- 2016 – 2018 Nordspor – Nordic Culture Fund, Nordic Info Flensburg, Germany
- 2015 Nukissat, Semersoq Municipality, Greenland
- 2015 7xDialog, Nikolaj Copenhagen Contemporary Art Center, Copenhagen, Denmark.
- 2014 The Lie Detector, Nikolaj Copenhagen Contemporary Art Center, Copenhagen, Denmark.
- 2013 The Seven Choices, Nikolaj Copenhagen Contemporary Art Center, Copenhagen, Denmark
- 2013 Do you know who I am? Nikolaj, Copenhagen Contemporary Art Center, Copenhagen, Denmark
- 2013 – 2014 Asannittumik inuulluarit, Paamiut, Tasiilaq, Nuuk, Semersoq Municipality, Greenland

== Exhibitions ==
=== Solo exhibitions ===
- 2026 – 2027 Wipe All Traces – An Archive of Re-membering, (duo exhibition with Kent Klich), Skissernas Museum, Lund, Sweden
- 2026 In the Past We Made History, (duo exhibition), Spritten Arthall, Skien, Norway
- 2025 In the Past We Made History, (duo exhibition), Havremagasinet Arthall, Boden, Sweden
- 2025 In the Past We Made History, (duo exhibition), Fotografisk Center, Copenhagen, Denmark
- 2024 Displaced, Alta Museum, Sápmi, Norway.
- 2023 – 2024 Possible Relatives, 9 artists and 3 in a collaboration, participating with 10 solo shows under the common title Universal/Remote Contemporary Art Museum Kumamoto, Japan (Oct.7-Dec.17, 2023), The National Art Center, Tokyo, Japan (March 6 - June 3, 2024), Hiroshima City Museum of Contemporary Art, Japan (June 29 - September 1, 2024). other artists: Daisuke Ida / Xu Bing / Trevor Paglen / Giorgi Gago Gagoshidze, Hito Steyerl, Miloš Trakilovic / Maiko Jinushi / Jeamin Cha / Evan Roth / Natsuko Kiura
- 2022 Displaced, The Royal Danish Library - The Black Diamond, Copenhagen, DK.
- 2021 Displaced, Sisimiut Katersugaasivat / Sisimiut Museum, Kalaallit Nunaat/Greenland
- 2020 Displaced, Nunatta Katersugaasivia Allagaateqarfialu / Greenland National Museum & Archives, Nuuk, Kalaallit Nunaat/Greenland
- 2020, Displaced, Nanortallip Katersugaasivia / Nanortalik Museum, Nanortalik, Kalaallit Nunaat/Greenland
- 2013 Migrant Documents, Arthall Fotografisk Center, Copenhagen, Denmark.
- 2013 Migrant Documents, Gallery Tegen2, Stockholm, Sweden.
- 2013 Seven Years, Fotogalleriet Format, Malmö, Sweden.
- 2011 I am nothing, Kulturhuset Gallery 3, Stockholm, Sweden.
- 2011 Dogwalk, Gallery KG52, Stockholm, Sweden.
- 2010 Seven Years, Gallery Illumenarts of Copenhagen, Denmark.
- 2010 Seven Years, The National Museum of Photography, The Black Diamond, Copenhagen, Denmark.
- 2008 Dogwalk, Danish Architecture Center, Denmark
- 2006 Possible Relatives, Fotografiens hus, Skeppsholmen, Stockholm, Sweden.
- 2006 Possible Relatives, Malmö Museum, Fotografiens hus, Malmö, Sweden.
- 2005 Possible Relatives, Viborg Artmuseum, Brænderigården,Denmark.
- 2004 Possible Relatives, Tampere Museum of Contemporary Art, Finland.
- 2003 Possible Relatives, Nikolaj, Copenhagen Contemporary Art Center, Copenhagen, Denmark.
- 2004 Out of a Time, Gallery Visu, Marseille, France.
- 2001 The Passage, The Museum of photography at Brandts klædefabrik, Odense, Denmark.
- 1999 Out of a Time, Galleri F48, Stockholm.
- 1999 Out of a Time, Galleri Image, Aarhus, Denmark.
- 1999 Coney Island (duoexhibition), Galleri Prinsen, Stockholm, Sweden.
- 1997 Out of a Time, Fotografisk Center, Copenhagen, Denmark.
- 1997 Coney Island (duo exhibition), Galleri Nykyaeka, Tammerfors, Finland.
- 1997 Coney Island (duo exhibition), Pere Fotograficenter, Åbo, Finland.
- 1996 Out of a Time, Fotografi Centrum, Malmö, Sweden

=== Group exhibitions ===
- 2026 Dwelling on Uncertain Ground: Essayistic Encounters between Fact and Fiction, curated by SixtyEight Art Institute for Goethe-Institut at Villa Kamogawa in Kyoto, Japan, as part of the KG+ photography festival.
- 2023 202 People In a Room, Hasselblad Center, Gothenburg, Sweden
- 2021 Missing Agenda: Even Below 37.5, Daegu Arts Center, Daegu, South Korea
- 2021 In Reality - Fotografisk Center 25 Years, curated by Mette Sandbye and Kristine Kern, Fotografisk Center, Copenhagen, Denmark
- 2021 Grave Monuments, Kunsthal Aarhus, DK / Art Sonje Center, Seoul, South Korea
- 2020 Billboard Festival, Istanbul, Turkey, Marroccan, turkish and nordic female artists.
- 2019 Taletid, Rønnebæksholm, Denmark
- 2018 Transit, KØS, Denmarks museum of Art in Public Spaces
- 2018 Inside/out - Loss and Displacement, The Center for Books Arts, New York, USA
- 2018 Published, Hasselblad Foundation in collaboration with Valand Art Academy, Göteborg, Sweden
- 2017 Bending The Frame, Preus, The National Photomuseum, Norway
- 2017 In Every Step There is a Movement, The European migrant crises, Code art fair, 4 refugees in dialogue with: Superflex, Danh Vo, Runo Lagomarsino, E.B Itso and Tina Enghoff.
- 2016 Watched! Monitoring: Photography and Surveillance in Europe, Hasselblad Center, Sweden
- 2016 Watched Monitoring: Photography and Surveillance in Europe, Kunsthal Aarhus, Denmark
- 2016 7xDialog, Nikolaj Copenhagen Contemporary Art Center, Fokus Video Art Festival 2016, DK
- 2016 Bending The Frame, Fotografisk Center, Denmark, (participating and co-curating together with Fred Ritchin).
- 2016 Friendship, Group exhibition with Scandinavien photo and video artists, Nivaagaards Malerisamling, Denmark
- 2016 Danish Contemporary photography from Kunst på arbejdspladsen, Rønnebæksholm Denmark
- 2015 The Seven Choices, Nikolaj Copenhagen Contemporary Art Center, Fokus Video Art Festival 2015, Denmark
- 2014 Present Photography, Museumsbygningen, Copenhagen, Denmark
- 2014 The Lie Detector, Nikolaj Copenhagen Contemporary Art Center, Fokus Video Art Festival 2014, Denmark
- 2013 The New South Sweden Photo Biennial, Sweden
- 2013 Violence and Memory, Jeonju Photo Festival, South Korea.
- 2012 Under the surface, Fotografisk Center, Copenhagen, Denmark.
- 2011 Gallery Tegen2, Stockholm, Sweden.
- 2010 NYPH 2010 - New York Photo Festival, USA.
- 2010 FOTODOK I Space for Documentary Photography, Utrecht, Holland.
- 2007 Achtung Kunst, contemporary photo from the collection, The National Museum of Photography, The Black Diamont, Denmark.
- 2006 Scandinavian Photography, Danmark, Scandinavia House, New York.
- 2005 Scandinavian Photography, Denmark, Grinell college, USA.
- 2004 Fotogalerie Wien, Vienna, Austria.
- 2003 Odense Phototriennale, Denmark.
- 1999 Gøteborg international fotofestival, Sweden.
- 1998 Underexposed, Billbord exhibition, Stockhom, Sweden.
- 1989 Artspace Rundetårn, Copenhagen, Denmark.
- 1985 Charlottenborg Arthall, Copenhagen, Denmark.

== Books ==
- 2021 Displaced, Dogwalk Books, Sweden/Vandkunsten, Denmark
- 2019 Collaboration, Dialogue and Trust, Siunissaq / Ilisimatusarfik / University og Greenland / Centre for Children, Youth & Family Research, Greenland.
- 2017 Isolation, Dogwalk Books, Sweden/Vandkunsten, Denmark
- 2017 Hate is, Dogwalk Books, Sweden/Vandkunsten, Denmark
- 2013 Migrant Documents, Journal, Sweden/Vandkunsten, Denmark
- 2010 Syv, Vandkunsten, Denmark
- 2010 Seven Years, Journal, Sweden
- 2008 Dogwalk, Journal, Sweden
- 2004 Possible Relatives, Journal, Sweden
- 2003 Eventuelle Pårørende, Tiderne Skifter, Copenhagen
- 1999 Fra en Tid, Rhodos, Denmark
- 1999 Out of a Time, Journal, Sweden

== Awards & Grants ==
- 2026 Work grant from the Danish Arts Foundation.
- 2025 Support from the Nordic Art Council to work with In The Past We Made History
- 2025 Work grant from the Danish Arts Foundation.
- 2023 Work grant from the Danish Arts Foundation.
- 2022 Support from the Nordic Art Council to work with the collaborative prison project Come Sit in your Cell and the Cell Will Tell You Everything
- 2021 Work grant from the Danish Arts Foundation.
- 2020 Work grant from the Danish Arts Foundation.
- 2019 2 year-grant for 2019 - 2021 from the Norwegian Art Council and The Danish Art Foundation together with professor in Community psychology at University of Greenland to develop on the praxis of Art and Social Communities.
- 2018 Work grant from the Danish Arts Foundation.
- 2018 Swedish Photo Documentary Prize 2018 from Arbetets museum, LO, TCO, ABF, Sensus and Dagens Arbete.
- 2016 Support from the Nordic Art Council to work with the collaborative project Nordspor in Denmark, Sweden, Norway, focusing on small towns in the outskirts of the Nordic countries.
- 2014 Work grant from the Danish Arts Foundation.
- 2010 Nominated for The Deutsche Börse Photography Prize
- 2009 Work Grant from the Danish Arts Foundation
- 2009 Layout and design for best photo book in Sweden
- 2005 Fogtdals Travel Award, Copenhagen Denmark
- 2004 Nominated for The Deutsche Börse Photography Prize
- 2000 Grant, Hasselbladfoundation, Sweden
- 1998 Layout and design for best photo book in Sweden
- 1997 Layout and design for best photo book in Sweden

== Bibliography ==
- Kragelund, Camilla (16 January 2026). "Photography Post-Truth". Filter for fotografi (8). Berlin: Filter for fotografi & Permanent Verlag: 48–49. ISBN 978-87-970031-3-8.
- Larsson, Erika (2025). "The Salutogenesis of Response within Tina Enghoff's Photography Workshops". In Parviainen, Anna; Saarikangas, Kirsi; Svarvar, Julia; Svinhufvud, Leena (eds.). Momentum 13: Between/Worlds: Resonant ecologies—a sonic inquiry into Nordic biennials. Abstract from NORDIK 2025. Helsinki, Finland: University of Helsinki. p. 39. ISBN 978-951-51-8329-3.
- Ring Petersen, Anne (2025). Worlding and Storying Forced Displacement: Contemporary Art and Refugee Experience in Denmark. Waiblingen: Transcript Verlag. ISBN 978-3-8376-7923-6.
- Wolthers, Anette; Torp, Margot (2023). Kvindernes og kønsminoriteternes blå bog 2023-2024 [The Blue Book of Women and Gender Minorities 2023-2024] (PDF) (in Danish). FIU-Ligestilling.
- Wolthers, Louise (24 October 2017). "Seeing through Scandinavian exceptionalism: Tina Enghoff's photography". Journal of European Studies. 47 (4): 372–391 – via Sage Journals.
- Wolthers, Louise; Vujanovic, Dragana; Östlind, Niclas, eds. (2016). Watched! Surveillance, Art and Photography. Köln (Cologne): Verlag der Buchhandlung Walther König. ISBN 978-3-86335-959-1.
