= Jane Muus =

Danish painter and illustrator (1919–2007)

Mary Jane Crafoord Muus (10 June 1919 – 12 July 2007) was a Danish painter and illustrator. Most of her works portray people, either in portraits or walking about on streets or market places in foreign countries. She is remembered above all for her sensitive, realistic illustrations in a wide range of Danish books. One of Denmark's foremost 20th-century illustrators, she had a unique style of her own.

== Biography ==
Born in Odder in central Jutland, she studied both painting and graphic arts at the Royal Danish Academy of Fine Arts under Aksel Jørgensen (1936–42). She travelled widely to France, Spain, Italy, North Africa and North America. Working in a predominantly Realist style, she also made woodcuts, illustrating the works of Charles Dickens or Herman Bang's Ved Vejen. In 1949, while in Paris, she illustrated an anthology of Jules Romains' works. She became a member of the Corner artists association in 1965. As a graphic artist, Muus preferred woodcuts but also used lithography and etching for her illustrations.

Jane Muus exhibited her woodcuts widely, both in Denmark and in Czechoslovakia (1948), Paris (1949), Lugano (1954), Stockholm (1958) and Rostock (1965). Her works can be seen in the national institutions of Norway, Sweden and France as well as in London's Victoria and Albert Museum and New York's Museum of Modern Art.

== Awards ==
In 1968, Muus was awarded the Eckersberg Medal and, in 1984, the Thorvaldsen Medal.
