= Carl-Henning Pedersen =

Danish painter

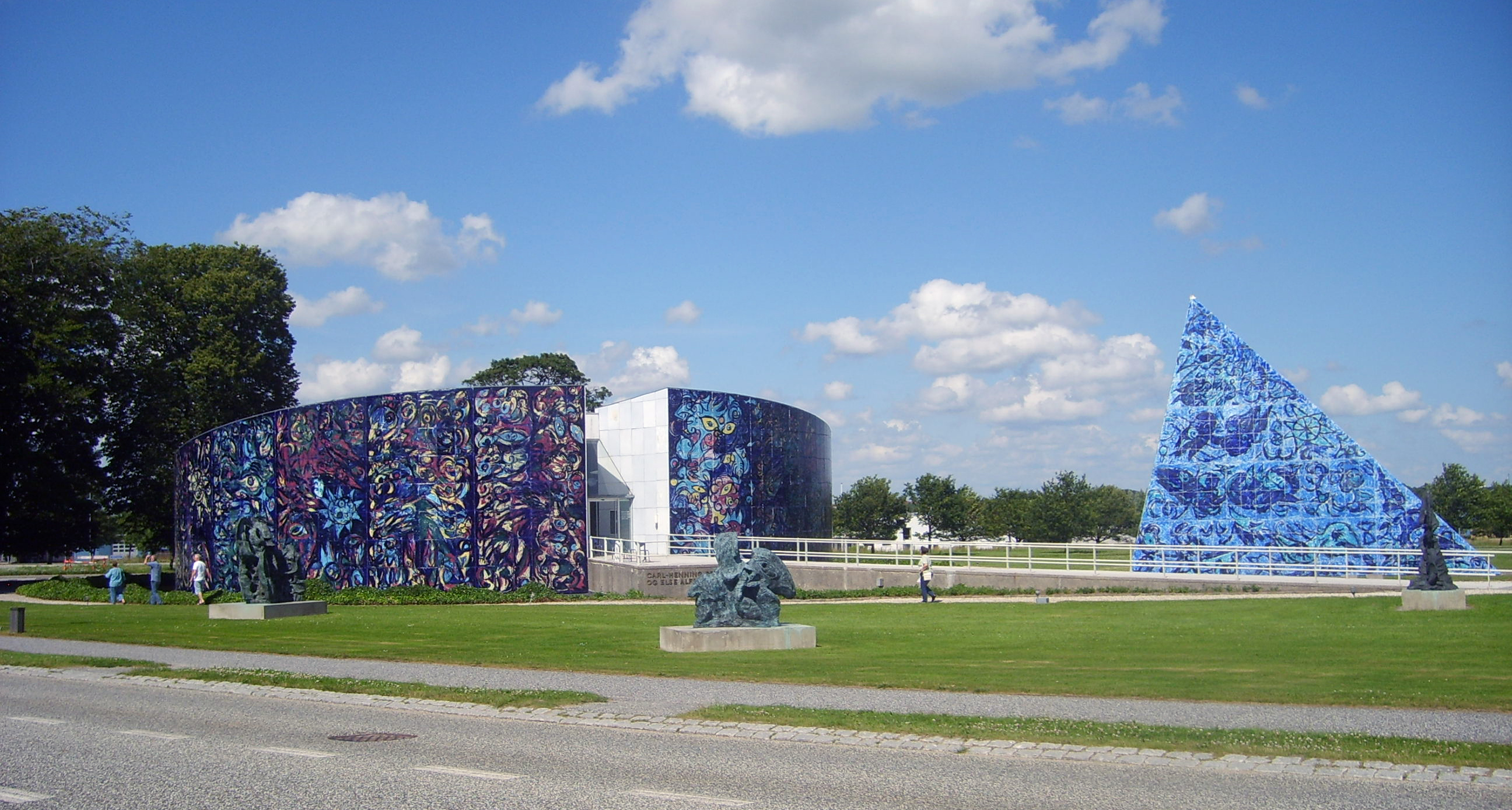
Carl-Henning Pedersen & Else Alfelts Museum in Birk outside Herning, Denmark

Carl-Henning Pedersen (23 September 1913 – 20 February 2007) was a Danish painter and a key member of the COBRA movement. He was known as the "Scandinavian Chagall", and was one of the leading Danish artists of the second half of the 20th century. He was married to Else Alfelt, another prominent CoBrA member.

== Biography ==
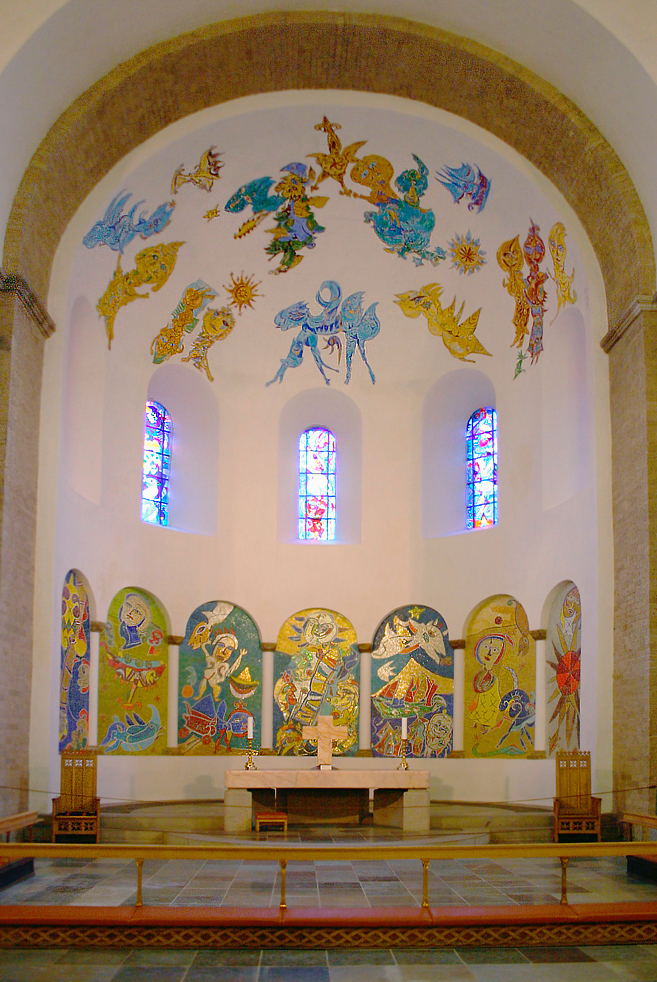
The apse in Ribe Cathedral (Denmark) decorated by Carl-Henning Pedersen. In Denmark, this work initiated contemporary decorations in old churches, but also stirred great controversy.

Pedersen was born in Copenhagen and brought up in the poor area near Vigerslev Alle. He held radical political beliefs. He joined the International Folk High School in Elsinore in 1933, where he met self-taught painter Else Alfelt. They married in 1934, and their first daughter, Vibeke Alfelt, was born later that year. Alfelt encouraged Pedersen to paint, and he first exhibited at the Artists' Autumn Exhibition (Kunstnernes Efterårsudstilling) in Copenhagen in 1936, where he showed four abstract works. His modernist style was at odds with the socialist realism preferred by his communist friends, who snubbed him and he argued with Bertolt Brecht about his art. His abstract works, with flat planes of colour, emulated the works of cubists and of Paul Klee.

Pedersen travelled on foot to Paris in 1939, where he saw works by Picasso and Matisse. He visited the exhibition of "degenerate art" (entartete Kunst) in Frankfurt am Main on his way home, where he was inspired by the paintings on show, particularly the works of Chagall, which remained a strong influence on his art for the rest of his life. His second daughter, Kari-Nina, was born in 1940. He joined the Høst group during the Nazi occupation of Denmark, writing about medieval Danish murals for its journal, Helhesten, and continued to produce seditiously modern abstract works.

He and his wife were amongst the founding members of the CoBrA movement in 1948. The movement took its name from the European cities where its founders were based: Copenhagen, Brussels and Amsterdam. They both remained with the group until it dissolved in 1951, producing free-form, spontaneous images in strong, fantastic colours. He won the Eckersberg Award in 1950 and the Guggenheim Award in 1958. A retrospective was put on at the Carnegie Institute in Pittsburgh in 1961, and he was Denmark's representative at the Venice Biennale in 1962. He won the Thorvaldsen Medal in 1963.

Pedersen moved into monumental art in the 1960s and 1970s, producing a large mosaic, "Cosmic Sea", for the H. C. Ørsted Institute at Copenhagen University, and a huge tiled wall decoration, "Fantasy Play Around the Wheel of Life", for the Angli courtyard in Herning for example.

Else Alfelt died in 1974, and Pedersen moved to Burgundy in the 1980s, although most of his work still came from Danish sources. He surprised many when he worked on the redecoration of the Gothic cathedral in Ribe, working on the murals, painted glass and mosaics to illustrate Bible stories from 1983 to 1987. He also produced bronze sculptures, and works in oils and watercolour.

Pedersen died in Copenhagen, after a long illness. He was survived by his second wife, Sidsel Ramson.

== The museum ==
Carl-Henning Pedersen & Else Alfelts Museum in Birk outside Herning, Denmark. The museum was designed by C.F. Møller (1898–1988) in 1976. Notorious for resisting selling his works, Pedersen donated thousands to the Carl-Henning Pedersen and Else Alfelt Museum. The museum houses a collection of the artist couple Carl-Henning Pedersen and Else Alfelt's paintings, watercolors, sculptures, mosaics.

== Literature ==
- Astrid Heise-Fjeldgren and Sylvie Poignet (2004): Carl-Henning Pedersen, Akvareller og tegninger, tekster og digte Borgen, ISBN 87-21-02141-4. Edited by CHPs second wife Sidsel Ramson. (in Danish)

== Other sources ==
- Obituary, International Herald Tribune, February 21, 2007
- Obituary, The Independent, 26 February 2007
- Obituary, The Guardian, 13 March 2007
- Obituary, The Times, 28 March 2007
- Biography Carl-Henning Pedersen & Else Alfelts Museum
