= Aggi Ásgerð Ásgeirsdóttir =

Faroese artist

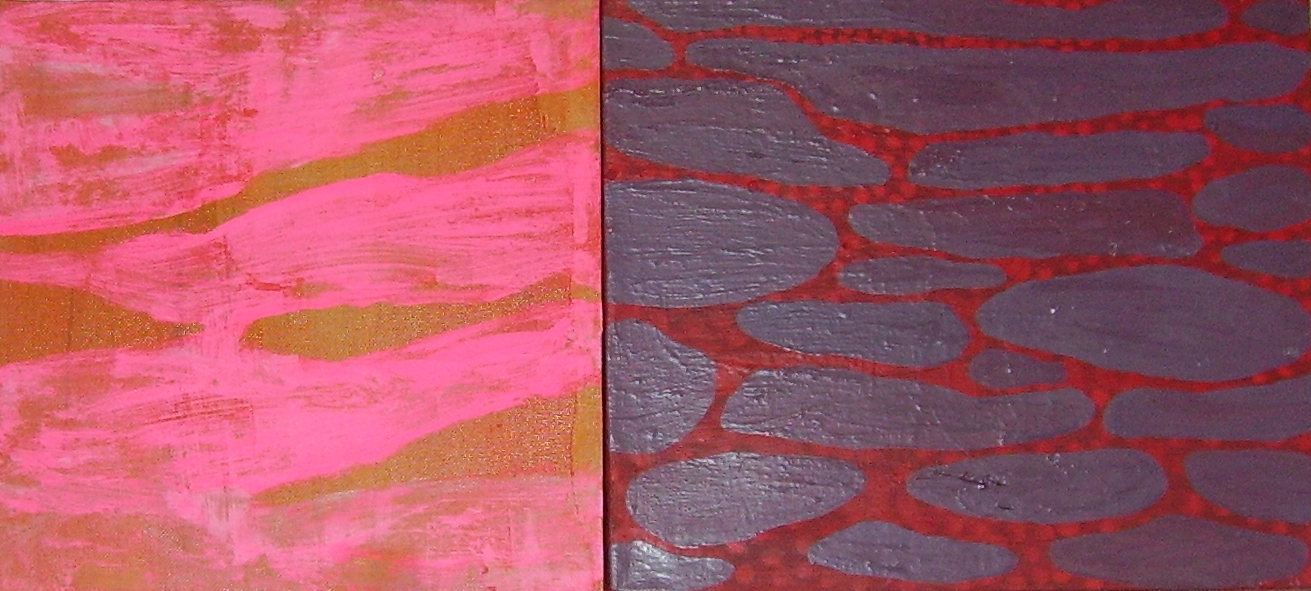
Drifting. 2006.

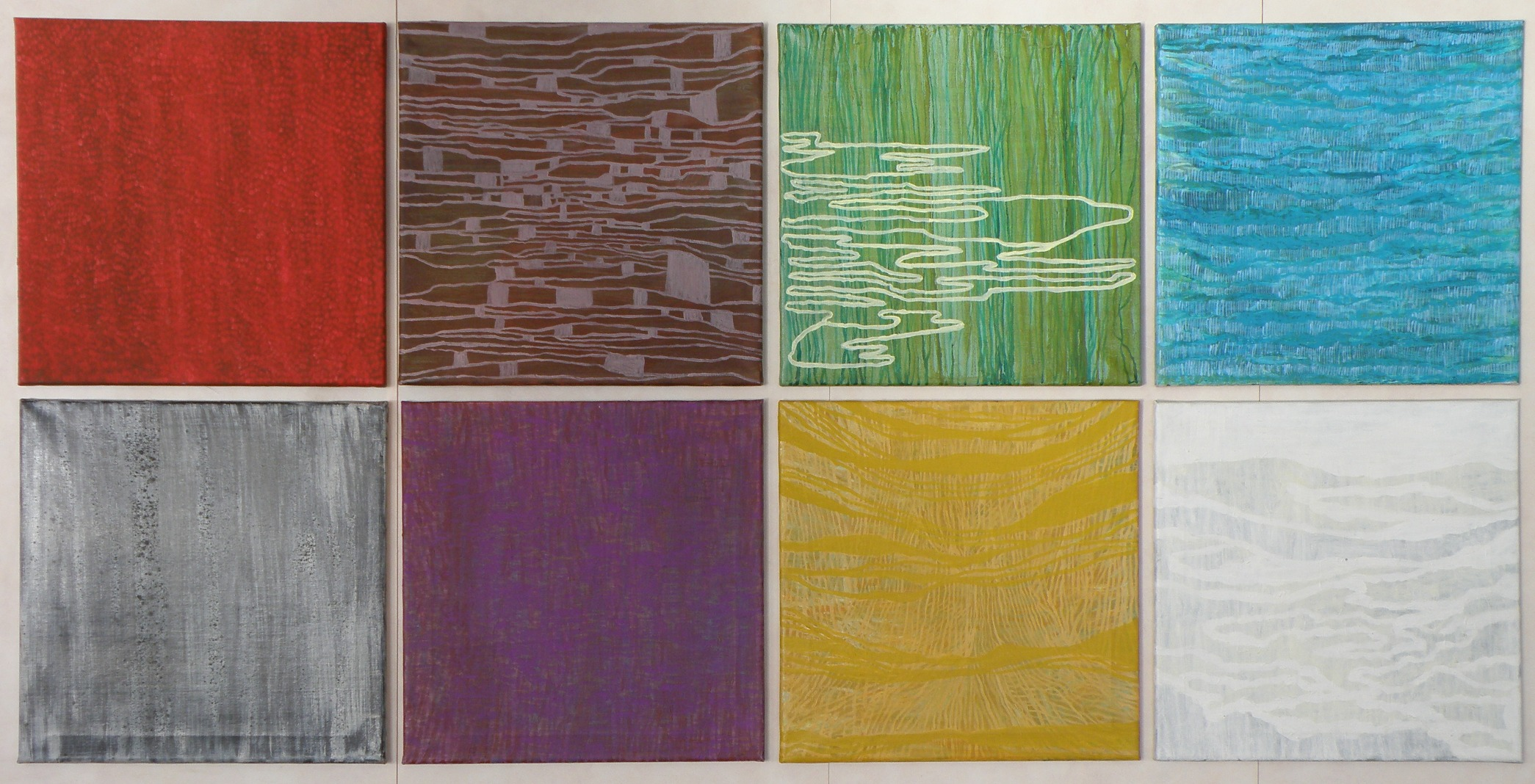
"Carpe Diem". Art Works by Aggi Ásgerð Ásgeirsdóttir, which are hanging on board the Suðuroy ferry Smyril.

Aggi Ásgerð Ásgeirsdóttir (born 1966) is a Faroese artist. She was born in Tórshavn, Faroe Islands. She was educated in Denmark and then moved back to the Faroe Islands, to the small village of Vágur in Suðuroy, which is the southernmost island. In the summer 2009 Aggi moved to Tórshavn or to Argir, now part of the municipality of Tórshavn. While Aggi was living in Suðuroy, her art was her main occupation, and also mentored Ruth Smith Art Museum in Vágur, she was the chairman of the association "Skálin við Skálá", which owns the museum. Aggi often showed the museum for tourists while she was living in Vágur.

== Faroese Art on board Smyril - the Suðuroy Ferry ==
In 2005 the old ferry Smyril, which sails daily between Tórshavn and Suðuroy, was replaced by a new ferry with the same name. It was decided, that the ship should also be kind of art museum showing some of young Faroese art. Aggi Ásgerð Ásgeirsdóttir was one of the younger Faroese artists who were chosen to decorate Smyril with their art. Aggi made a collection of eight art works which she gave the title "Carpe Diem".

== Faroese Art in The School Centre in Suðuroy ==
In 2009 a new school building was built in Suðuroy, between the villages Hov and Porkeri. There are two schools in the building: The High School of Suðuroy and the Health School of the Faroe Islands. Three people were chosen to decorate the school building; and Aggi Ásgerð Ásgeirsdóttir was one of them. The school has decorated a large wall in the cafeteria with paintings.
