= Kirsten Christensen =

Danish painter and ceramist

Kirsten Annette Christensen (born 1943) is a Danish painter and ceramist. She has created large reliefs depicting existential themes such as old age, sickness, pollution and death.

== Biography ==
Born in Copenhagen on 7 February 1943, Christensen first studied art at the Arts and Crafts School (1964–69) before attending the masonry and space art department of the Royal Danish Academy of Fine Arts (1969–75). After graduating, she became a teaching assistant. In that capacity, she participated in decorating the pedestrian tunnels in Albertslund and Hjørring. Using stoneware as her preferred material, she initially created imaginative compositions but soon began to include human figures and scenes. Her work often resembled a notice board with items depicting developments through time and space. Her principal accomplishment of the period was her 1978 exhibition in Gentofte called Min Mor og Mig (My Mother and Me) which consisted of 17 ceramic works with text describing the artist's relationship with her sick mother. They depicted the strong personal emotions she experienced as her mother's illness deteriorated in nursing homes until she died. The juxtaposition of reality, memory and dreams brought Christensen recognition as one of the most important female artists in Denmark.

In 1982, Christensen decorated Hjortespring Library with 25 elements in stoneware and acrylics depicting the increasing threat to the survival of whales and other endangered animals, the largest item being a blueish black whale. Kristensen has also decorated the waiting room at Aalborg Station (1988) with 18 brightly coloured acrylic plates and, in 1992, completed 30 polychrome glass panels for the ceiling at Køge Waterpark.
