= Anne Mette Hjortshøj =

Danish studio potter

Anne Mette Hjortshøj is a Danish studio potter based on the island of Bornholm, Denmark.

== Biography ==
Hjortshøj graduated from the Glas and Ceramic School on Bornholm in 2000 before completing an 18-month apprenticeship with master potter Phil Rogers in 2002. Thereafter she moved back to Bornholm and set up her own pottery studio.

Hjortshøj uses clay and materials from Bornholm, sourced directly from the surrounding countryside and coast, "Hjortshøj increasingly uses the clay from under her feet in Bornholm." Her ceramics are both wood fired and salt fired in one of her kilns and she exclusively exhibits her pottery with Goldmark Gallery in the United Kingdom, who also filmed a documentary about her life and work. This film was seen by the Queen of Denmark, Margrethe II of Denmark, on television, who subsequently visited Hjortshøj in her studio.
