= Lene Adler Petersen =

Danish artist (born 1944)

Lene Adler Petersen (born January 1944) is a Danish artist. Her artistic practice is characterized through a continuous collecting, sorting and mixing process of media and techniques and includes happenings and performance art as well as painting, ceramics, drawings, printmaking and installations, film and photography.

== Biography ==
Adler Petersen was educated at Det Jyske Kunstakademi 1964-66 and The Royal Danish Academy of Fine Arts 1968–69. She stems from a generation of Danish artists who came to visibility in the 1960s through performance art, installation art and film.

Adler Petersen's interest in collecting and sorting play a crucial role in her diverse artistic expressions. Her political conceptual work is characterized by an investigation into the contemporary representations of women. An early work of hers, "Uddrivelsen fra templet, nøgen kvindelig Kristus, d. 29. maj, kl. 15.50, 1969, Børsen", is a performance made together with artist Bjørn Nørgaard, who she later married. In the performance, Adler Petersen carried a cross through the Børsen while naked, mimicking the crucifixion of Jesus.

By the time she completed her study of visual arts at the Royal Danish Academy, she was already part of the experimental art scene in Copenhagen formed around Eks-skolen. During that period she worked primarily as filmmaker, painter and a collage artist besides engaging and contributing to the collaborative work in the Danish art community. Throughout her life Lene Adler Petersen has been involved in several artist groups as ABCinema, Eks-skolens trykkeri, Tidskriftet Kvinder and Arme and Ben. She has been a member of the Danish artists association Kammeraterne since 1995.

Since the 1960s, Adler Petersen has created a rich collection of drawings. She has significantly influenced a generation of younger Danish artists by the making of conceptual and feminist art in Scandinavia. Her interests in creativity and the role of subjectivity and personal history challenges conventional paradigmas of gender, female representation and artistic production.

Adler Petersen is represented in private institution and museums among others; The National Gallery of Denmark, Aarhus Kunstmuseum, Kunsten and Kobberstiksamlingen.

== Selected works ==
- 1967-71 "Dagsbogsfilm I-V og Arkivfilm". 8mm film in collaboration with Bjørn Nørgaard.
- 1969. "Uddrivelsen fra templet, nøgen kvindelig Kristus, d. 29. maj, kl. 15.50, 1969, Børsen". Happening in collaboration with Bjørn Nørgaard.
- 1972 "3 piger og en Gris". 16mm film in collaboration with Ursula Reuter Christiansen, Elisabeth Therkildsen and Per Kirkeby.
- 1974 "Udklip på papir med Kvindetegnet". 484 cut-outs on paper and collage.
- 1974 "Dagbog fra mørkekammeret på Eks-skolens Trykkeri". Photography.
- 1976 ’Tingene, Din Historie, Befri Dig for Tingene (Friheden Fører Folket)’ in the Collection of Statens Museum for Kunst.
- 1977 "Tag en sten op". 1200 drawings.
- 1983 "Portrættet af Rita fra Aarhus". Collage and spray. Serial work in the period 1976 -1983.

== Publications and artist books ==
- 1971 "Se mor". Nansensgade 1971 / Sangen Om Kaffekoppen (10"), New Edition by Institut for Dansk Lydarkæologi.
- 1975 "Billedlotteri". New edition by Museet for Samtidskunst, Danmark.
- 1977 "Tag En Sten Op". (317 pages) Publisher Borgen.
- 1980 "Ting, nogle parforhold". (31 pages) Edition of Lene Adler Petersen.
- 1982 "Motivet". (32 pages) Published by Galleri Specta.
- 1983 "Fire Parader/ Tegninger". Eks-Skolens Forlag.
- 2003 "Et Håndklæde/ A Towel". Drawings on Paper. (91 pages) Eks-Skolens Trykkeri Aps.
- 2010 "Kvindetegnet". Gyldendal.

== Public collections ==
- Statens Museum for Kunst Kobberstiksamlingen
- ARoS Aarhus Kunstmuseum
- Ny Carlsberg Glyptotek
- Kunsten Museum of Modern Art Aalborg Randers Kunstmuseum
- Horsens Kunstmuseum
- Silkeborg Kunstmuseum
- Esbjerg Kunstmuseum
- Vejle Kunstmuseum
- Skive Kunstmuseum
- Fyns Kunstmuseum
- Kastrupgaardsamlingen
- Kunstmuseet Køge Skitsesamling
- Designmuseum Danmark
