= Sophia Kalkau =

Danish artist

- Born: 1960 (age 65–66)
- Education: Royal Danish Academy of Fine Arts
- Website: http://www.kalkau.dk

Sophia Kalkau (born 1960) is a Danish artist, who works in a variety of media including writing, photography, sculpture and installation. Sophia Kalkau has studied Art History at Copenhagen University and holds a degree in Art Theory from the Royal Danish Academy of Fine Arts. She is the author of numerous publications on aesthetics.

== Works ==
In the center of Kalkau's art stands a critical, open dialogue that researches vocabularies of material and form around the female body through a photographic work. In a repetitive act of merging, binding and combining human figures and geometrical objects Kalkau formulates an artistic narrative of surface continuity and spatial organization.

A key characteristic of her oeuvre is a conceptual approach to contemporary sculpture that she serially explores through her own body. Kalkau's interest in physical, cognitive and perceptive transitions materializes frequently in a scenographic performative gesture that she records through serial photographic prints. Kalkau's photographic work defies an unambiguous reading and invites the viewer to various interpretations.

== Art in public space in selection ==
- 2025 "Dråbebroen", Christiansfeld
- 2023 "Zygote", Christmas Møllers Plads, Copenhagen
- 2021 "Fra himlen fra havet – Portaler til poesi", Forensic department of Mental Health Centre Sct. Hans, Roskilde.
- 2016 "Marmorstelen", Grøndalskirken, Copenhagen.
- 2016 "Det Ægyptiske Æg", Den Frie Centre of Contemporary Art, Copenhagen.
- 2015 "Another Way of Watching", Slotsvase. Palsgaard Slot, Juelsminde, Denmark.
- 2013-2015 "Cirklen, Kurven, Bladet". The New University Hospital, Skejby, Denmark.
- 2012 "Black Column". Pier project Søndergaard, Ballerup, Denmark.
- 2011 "Atrium". Hospice Djursland, Rønde, Denmark.
- 2010/2011 "Lenticula". The historic site of Skibelund Krat, Denmark.
- 2005 "Quadrature of the Moon". The Royal Danish Academy Architecture Library. Copenhagen, Denmark.
- 2003 "Black Lines". Vejleåparken, Ishøj, Denmark.

== Public collection in selection ==
- SMK - National Gallery of Denmark
- New Carlsberg Foundation
- Kunsten – Museum of Modern Art Aalborg
- Arken Denmark
- Horsens Kunstmuseum
- Museet for Fotokunst
- AROS Aarhus Kunstmuseum
- Vejlemuseerne
- Vejen Kunstmuseum
- KØS – Museum of Art in Public Spaces

== Books and Publications ==
- 2022 "UNG SOM BLY | CIRKELBRYDER"
- 2019 "STOFFET OG ÆGGET", Kunsten - Museum of Modern Art, Aalborg.
- 2017 "LINE OF CIRCLES", Author Ursula Andkjær Olsen and Helle Brøns, Sorø Kunstmuseum, Denmark.
- 2014 "SOLEN ER HVID" author Ursula Andkjær Olsen.
- 2011 "Sophia Kalkau - efter ægget : en konstellation af værker fra 1999 til i dag". Author Ursula Andkjær Olsen, Editor and Author Claus Hagedorn-Olsen. Horsens Kunstmuseum, Denmark.
- 2010 "Sophia Kalkau : Tæt på, langt ude = Close up, far out". Author: Mikkel Bogh, Camilla Jalving and Flemming Friborg. Kalkaus Forlag.
- 2009 “PART OF THE MILL”, Maison du Danemark, Paris.
- 2008 "Dog and Die", Sophia Kalkau, publisher Brandt, Odense.
- 2007 FRA HEXA TIL VASEN, New Carlsberg Glyptotek.
- 2002 Hun og jeg og dyrene : prosastykker. Author Sophia Kalkau. Publisher Borgen.
- 2000 Månespil, Author Sophia Kalkau, Publisher Borgen.
