= Egill Jacobsen =

Danish painter

- Born: 16 December 1910; Copenhagen, Denmark
- Died: 21 April 1998 (aged 87); Copenhagen, Denmark
- Occupations: Painter and later professor

Egill Jacobsen (16 December 1910 – 21 April 1998) was a Danish painter who became a professor at the Royal Danish Academy.

== Biography ==
Born in Copenhagen, Jacobsen studied painting at the Royal Danish Academy of Fine Arts under Kræsten Iversen and Peder Hald (1932-33). His earliest paintings were inspired by traditional Danish landscape painting under the influence of Albert Gottschalk but after visiting Paris in 1934 when he experienced the work of Matisse and Picasso, he began to create Abstract images of brightly coloured beak-shaped masked figures inspired by ethnographic art. He went on to paint a series of works devoid of any motifs in which colour was the only criterion for expression. From 1940, he produced more masked images with geometrical shapes depicting teeth, eggs and other such features in pure spectral colours. His Græshoppedans (Grasshopper Dance, 1941) depicts simplied figures in a work suggesting the culmination of high summer.

== Awards ==
In 1959, Jacobsen was awarded the Eckersberg Medal.

== Literature ==
- Jacobsen, Egill; Korshøj, Lotte; Lundgren Nielsen, Hanne (2011). Egill Jacobsen: saglighed og mystik (in Danish). Carl-Henning Pedersen og Else Alfelts Museum. ISBN 978-87-991355-8-5.
- Jespersen, Gunnar; Jacobsen, Egill (1990). Harmony of Colour: The Painting of Egill Jacobsen. A. Nyborg Private Edition. ISBN 978-87-89585-03-1.
