= 1895 Copenhagen Women's Exhibition =

Nordic culture exhibition for women

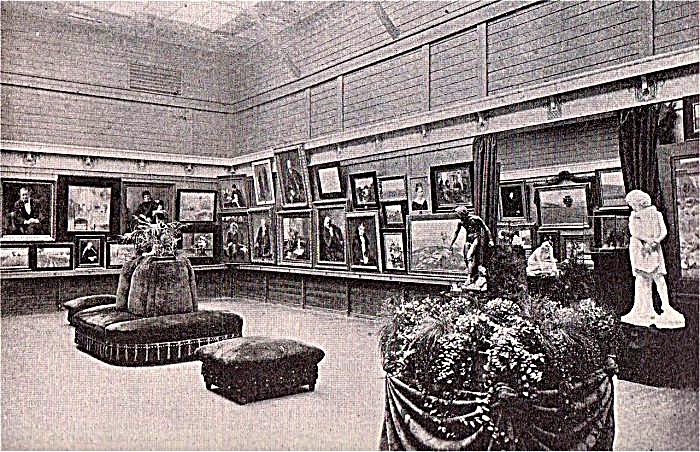
Art display at the Women's Exhibition

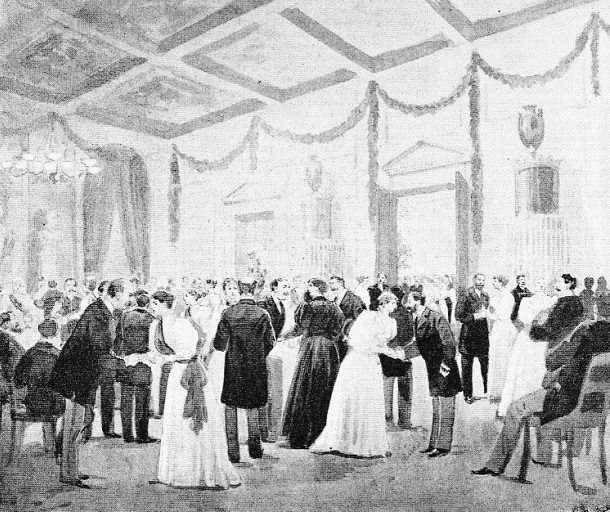
Sketch of the Women's Exhibition from Illustreret Tidende

The Women's Exhibition from the Past and Present (Danish: Kvindernes Udstilling fra Fortid og Nutid) held in Copenhagen in 1895 was an art and culture exhibition for women from the Nordic countries. Inspired by the 1893 World's Fair in Chicago, it was designed to demonstrate how far Nordic women had advanced in the areas of education, employment and art. The first of its kind in Europe, it was considered a great success.

== Background ==
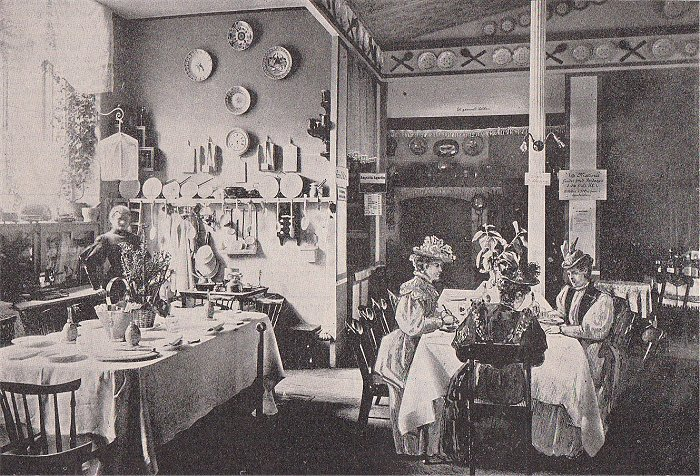
Old and new kitchen exhibit

The Chicago World's Fair in 1893 had impressed Danish visitors with its Woman's Building containing presentations of art and literature. Sophie Oxholm (1848–1935), who had visited the exhibition, was obviously impressed by the exhibition, especially the show of Danish needlework. On her return to Denmark, she immediately brought a number of influential women together with a view to arranging a Nordic women's exhibition in Copenhagen the following year. Despite initial enthusiasm, as a result of budgetary and management problems, it was announced in February 1894 that the exhibition would not be held until 1895.

Oxholm, who experienced difficulty in managing the arrangements, gave up her position as head of the coordinating committee in early 1895. She was replaced by Bertha Buch of the Women's Society but it was Emma Gad (1852–1921) who proved to be the most effective member. Appointed deputy chair, Gad managed to complete all the arrangements on time. These included selecting the site of the exhibition which was ultimately shared between the Industrial Association building (Industriforeningen), which had been built in connection with the 1872 Nordic Exhibition, and the premises of Den Frie Udstilling. It was therefore possible for the exhibition to open on 22 June 1895 in the presence of Queen Louise.

== Exhibition ==
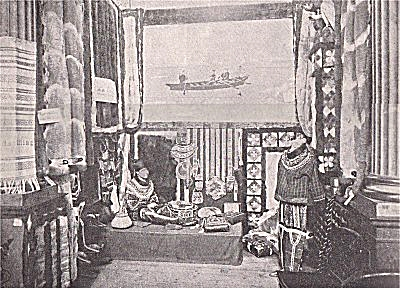
The Greenland exhibit

In addition to exhibits from Denmark, the exhibition contained areas specifically dedicated to the Danish provinces and overseas territories (Faroe Islands, Greenland, Iceland and Danish West Indies) as well as to Norway and Sweden. There are records of the 2,415 exhibits covering painting, curiosities (including items associated with celebrated women), arts and crafts, costumes, jewellery (including gold- and silverware), literature (manuscripts, journals and books) and appliances. There were also separate listings of exhibits relating to housekeeping, philanthropy, hygiene, education, household crafts (spinning and weaving, leather, wood, embroidery, silk painting, and whitework), music and art.

For the Den Frie Udstilling building, there was a separate inventory of 301 artworks, paintings and sculptures, listed by artist.

== Key organizers ==
The two women who were instrumental in organizing the exhibition were Sophie Oxholm and, above all, Emma Gad.

== Outcome ==
The Women's Exhibition was a great success. Not only was it appreciated in Denmark and beyond, it made a substantial profit. Gad had hoped the money could be used for an independent "Women's Building" (Kvindernes Bygning) with a meeting room, reading room, restaurant and accommodation for women from the provinces. Work did not begin on the building until 1929. It was completed in 1937.

== Exhibitors ==
Works by the following artists were included in the Women's Exhibition:

=== Sculptors ===
- Elna Borch
- Henriette Diderichsen
- Agnes Lunn (also painter)
- Anne Marie Carl-Nielsen
- Johanne Pedersen-Dan
- Nielsine Petersen
- Adelgunde Vogt (posthumous)

=== Composers ===
- Johanne Amalie Fenger
- Nanna Liebmann
- Elisabeth Meyer
- Tekla Griebel Wandall

=== Painters ===
- Anna Ancher
- Marie Bang
- Ville Bang
- Brita Barnekow
- Louise Bonfils
- Alfrida Baadsgaard
- Clara Carl
- Anthonore Christensen
- Augusta Dohlmann
- Charlotte Frimodt
- Johanne Frimodt
- Henriette Hahn-Brinckmann
- Ane Marie Hansen
- Marie Henriques
- Sophie Holten
- Susette Holten
- Elise Konstantin-Hansen
- Johanne Cathrine Krebs
- Birgitte Levison
- Agnes Lunn (also sculptor)
- Marie Luplau
- Augusta Læssøe
- Emma Løffler
- Emma Meyer
- Jenny Meyer
- Emilie Mundt
- Bertha Nathanielsen
- Dagmar Olrik
- Anna Petersen
- Marie Preetzmann
- Louise Ravn-Hansen
- Holga Reinhard
- Marie Sandholt
- Charlotte Sannom
- Laura Sarauw
- Elisabeth Schiøtt
- Ida Schiøttz-Jensen
- Mimi Schwartzkopf
- Anna Smidth
- Olga Smith
- Edma Stage
- Emma Thomsen
- Emmy Thornam
- Ludovica Thornam
- Elisabeth Tornøe
- Nicoline Tuxen
- Elisabeth Wandel
- Bertha Wegmann

==== Posthumous ====
- Elisabeth Jerichau Baumann
- Juliane Hammer (died shortly before the opening)
- Eleonore Christine Harboe
- Hanne Hellesen
- Marie Knudsen
- Julie Lütken
- Christine Løvmand
- Sophie Madsen
- Hermania Neergaard
- Bolette Puggaard
- Georgia Skovgaard (two sketchbooks from Italian travels 1854-55 and eight embroideries)
- Mariane Stub
- Eleonora Tscherning
