= Hellesen =

Hellesen is a surname. Notable people with the surname include:

- Gunnar Fredrik Hellesen (1913–2005), Norwegian politician
- Hanne Hellesen (1801–1844), Danish painter
- Richard Hellesen (born 1956), American playwright
- Thorvald Hellesen (1888–1937), Norwegian abstract artist, designer and painter
- Wilhelm Hellesen (1836–1892), Danish inventor and industrialist
