= Marie Vilhelmine Bang =

Danish painter

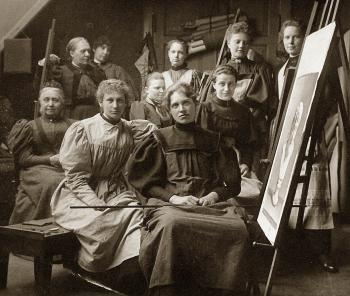
Bang and Paulli with students at their art school

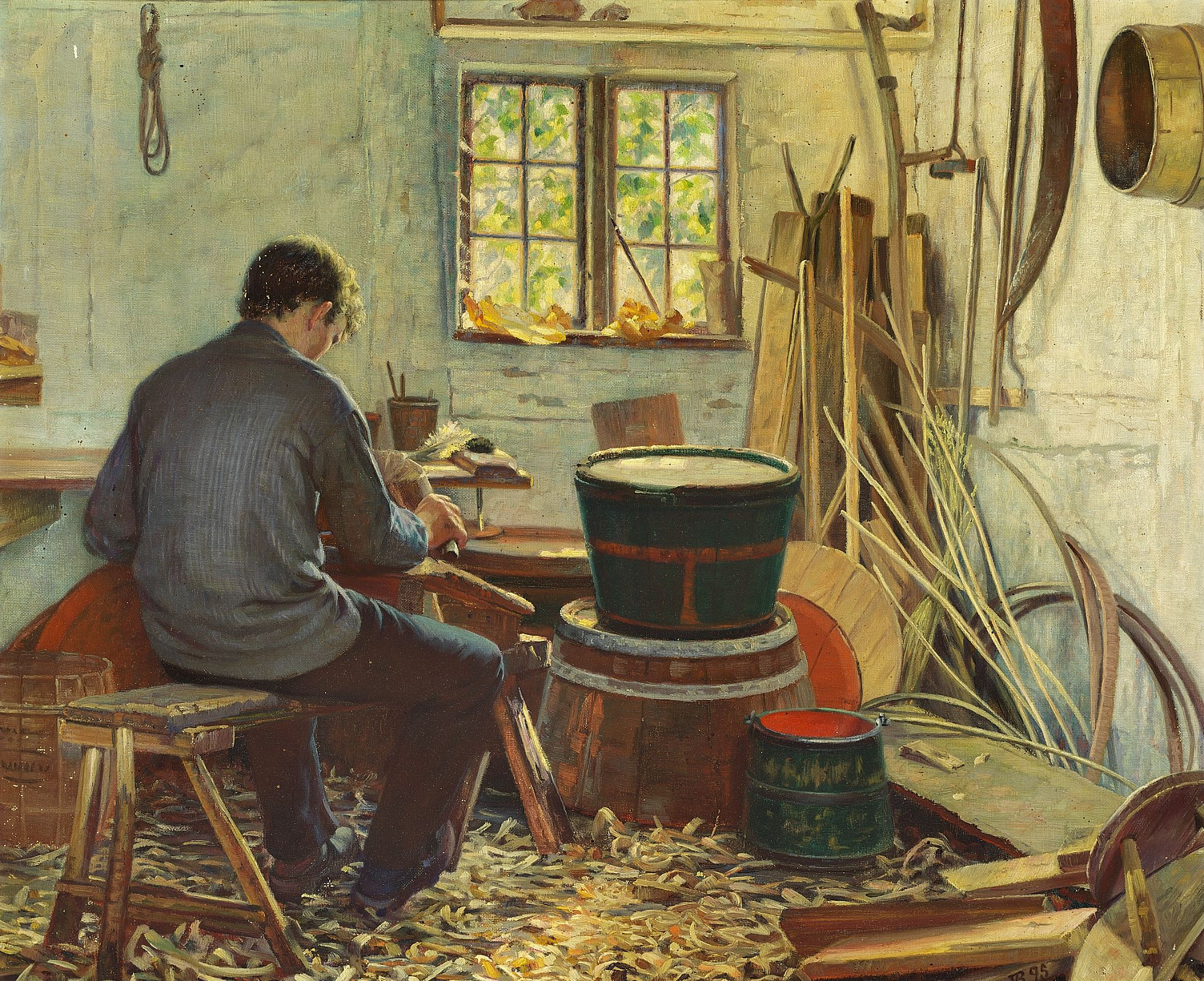
Bang's A Cooper in His Workshop (1895)

Marie Vilhelmine Bang (1848–1932), commonly known as Ville Bang, was a Danish painter of portraits, landscapes and genre works. In 1888, together with 22 other women, she presented a petition to the parliament, calling for the Art Academy to be expanded to admit women. It led to the establishment of Kunstakademiets Kunstskole for Kvinder where in October 1888 she was one of the first students. Together with Augusta Paulli, she later opened an art school to prepare women for the Academy.

== Biography ==
Born on 3 March 1848 in Copenhagen, Marie Vilhelmine Bang was the daughter of the politician and later prime minister Peter Georg Bang (1797–1861) and Marie Caroline Fribert (1803–1875). She received training from three notable painters of the period: Frederik Vermehren, Jørgen Roed and Vilhelm Kyhn. Kyhn submitted samples of her artwork, together with drawings by Augusta Paulli and Ane Marie Hansen, in an unsuccessful attempt to have them admitted to the Academy.

While still young, following in Roed's footsteps, Bang made a drawing of a chapter in Ribe Cathedral (1865), attracting the interest of the art historian Niels Laurits Høyen. Inspired by Høyen, she went on to paint secluded landscapes, including scenes of Bornholm (1870). She first exhibited at the Charlottenborg Spring Exhibition in 1873, becoming a frequent exhibitor thereafter. In 1876, she was a student of Paul Gauguin, living in his Paris home. She attended the Académie Julian where she studied under Léon Bonnat and Tony Robert-Fleury. Thanks to a ministerial grant, she travelled to Italy in the late 1870s and again around 1886, painting subjects she exhibited at Charlottenborg in 1887.

In 1888, together with 22 other women including Anne Marie Carl-Nielsen and Nathalie Krebs, she signed a petition to the parliament, calling for the Art Academy to be expanded to admit women. It led to the establishment of the Women's Art School (Kunstakademiets Kunstskole for Kvinder) where from October 1888 to May 1889 she was one of the first students. Together with Augusta Paulli, she later opened an art school to prepare women for the Academy.

A keen supporter of women's causes, Bang was a member of the Danish Women's Society. She participated in the 1895 Copenhagen Women's Exhibition and, as a member of the Women Artists Society Kvindelige Kunstneres Samfund, in the 1920 Women Artists Retrospective (Kvindelige Kunstneres retrospektive Udstilling).

Bang spent her later years in the Støvringgård Convent near Randers where she died on 1 January 1932. She is buried in the convent's cemetery.
