= Hermania Neergaard =

Danish painter (1799–1875)

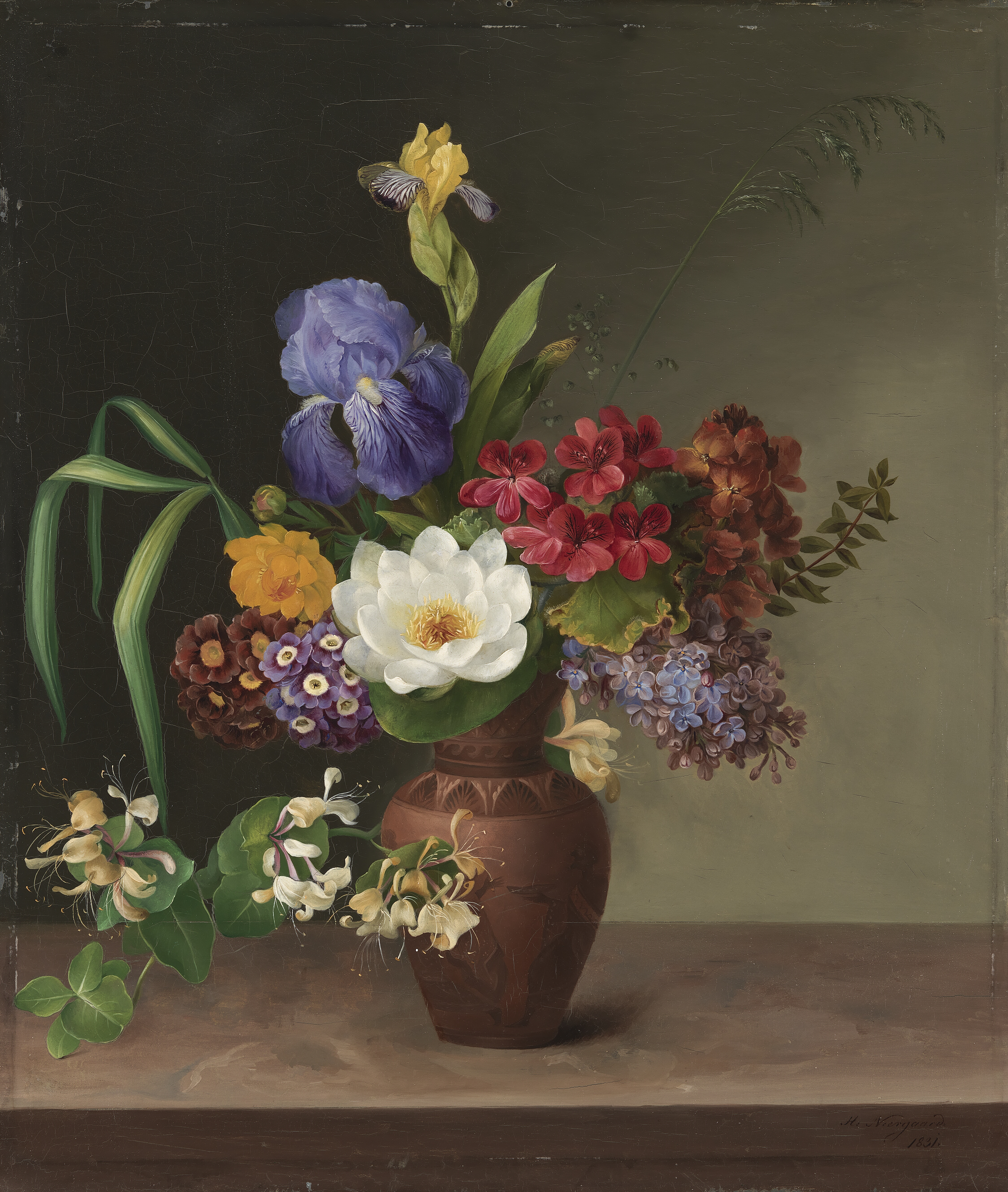
Vase in Greek style with iris, lilac and honeysuckle by Hermania Neergaard (1831)

Hermania Sigvardine Neergaard (1799–1875) was a Danish flower and still-life painter. A student of Frederik Christian Camradt (1762–1844), she exhibited her paintings in Charlottenborg where several were bought by the royal family.

== Biography ==
Born on 12 August 1799 in Copenhagen, Hermania Sigvardine Neergaard was the daughter of the merchant Hans Peter Neergaard (c.1774–1810) and Sophie Kristine Læssøe (1777–1867). She learnt to paint at F.C. Camradt's drawing and painting school.

From 1821 and for the rest of her life, Neergaard was a frequent exhibitor at the Charlottenborg Spring Exhibitions. Her first submission was a vase of flowers, copied from one of Camradt's works. It was in gouache, a technique used by the older flower painters at the time. She subsequently worked with oils, depicting flowers in vases, bowls or baskets. In later life, she included wild flowers and outdoor plants. Inspired by Bertel Thorvaldsen, in 1831 she began to paint flowers in Etruscan vases. Similar motifs can be seen in the colourful works painted a few years later by her contemporary Johan Laurentz Jensen.

Like Thorvaldsen, Neergaard was one of the painters associated with Nysø Manor near Præstø. Thorvaldsen bought one of her paintings to add to his collection. Her works were also purchased by the Danish kings Christian VIII and Frederick VII.

Hermania Neergaard died at Bagsværd on 23 March 1875. She is buried in Slagelse.

== Gallery ==
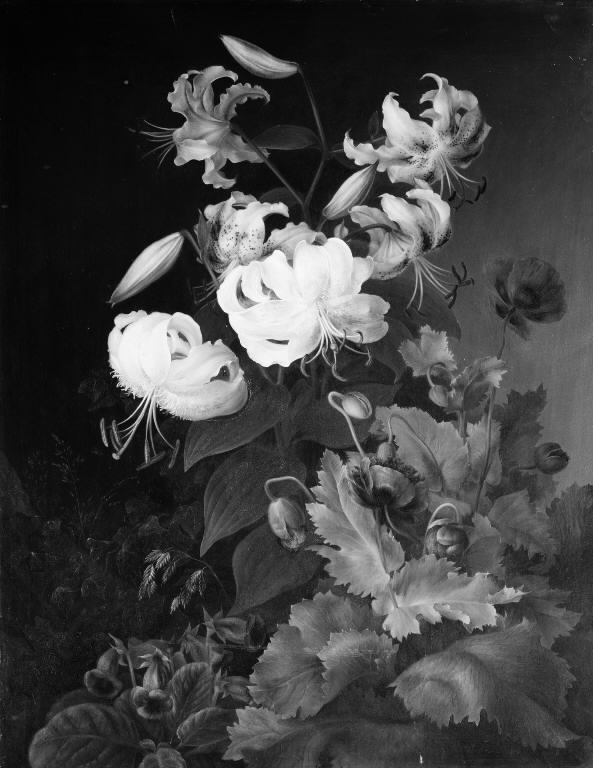
Blomstrende planter, Danish National Gallery (1845)

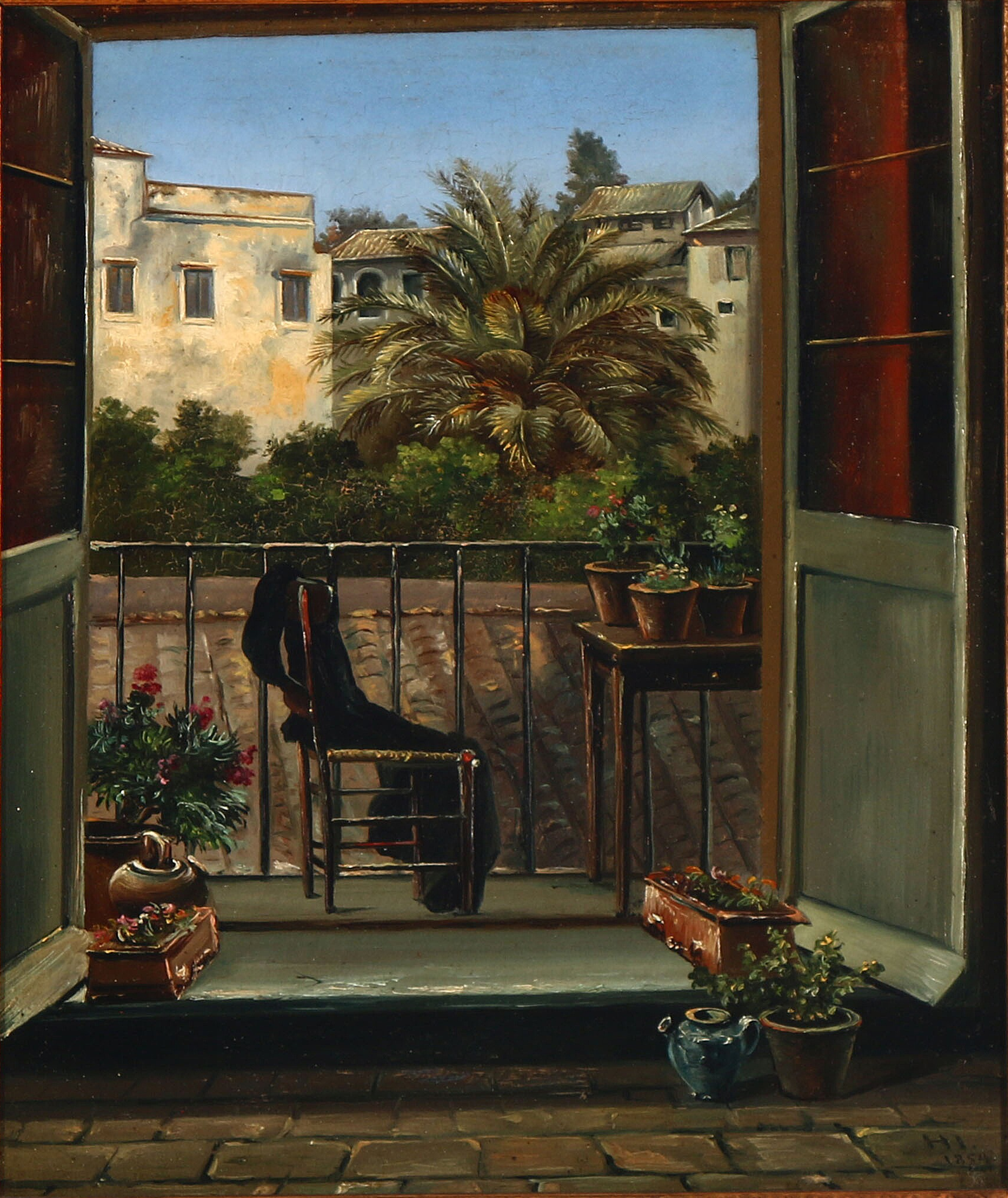
A view from Paganis Villa on Capri (1854)

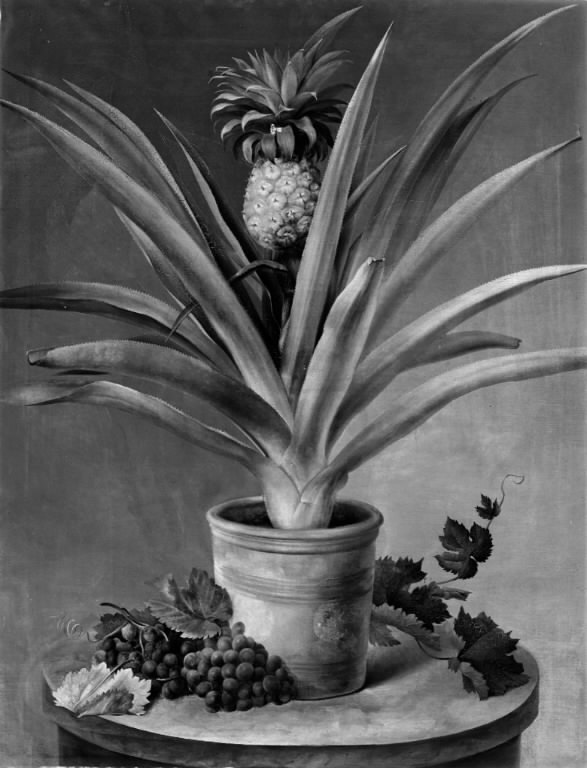
En ananas i urtepotte og druer på et stenbord

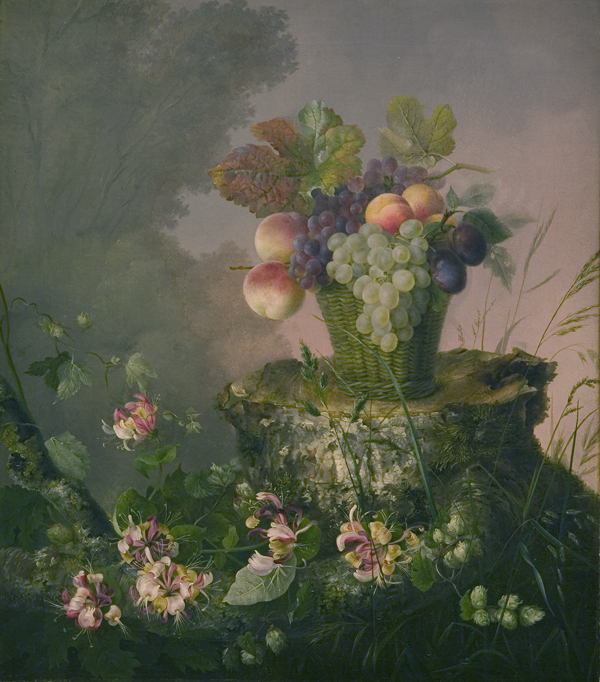
Blomsterkurv med frugt ved en træstub
