= Agnes Lunn =

Danish painter and sculptor

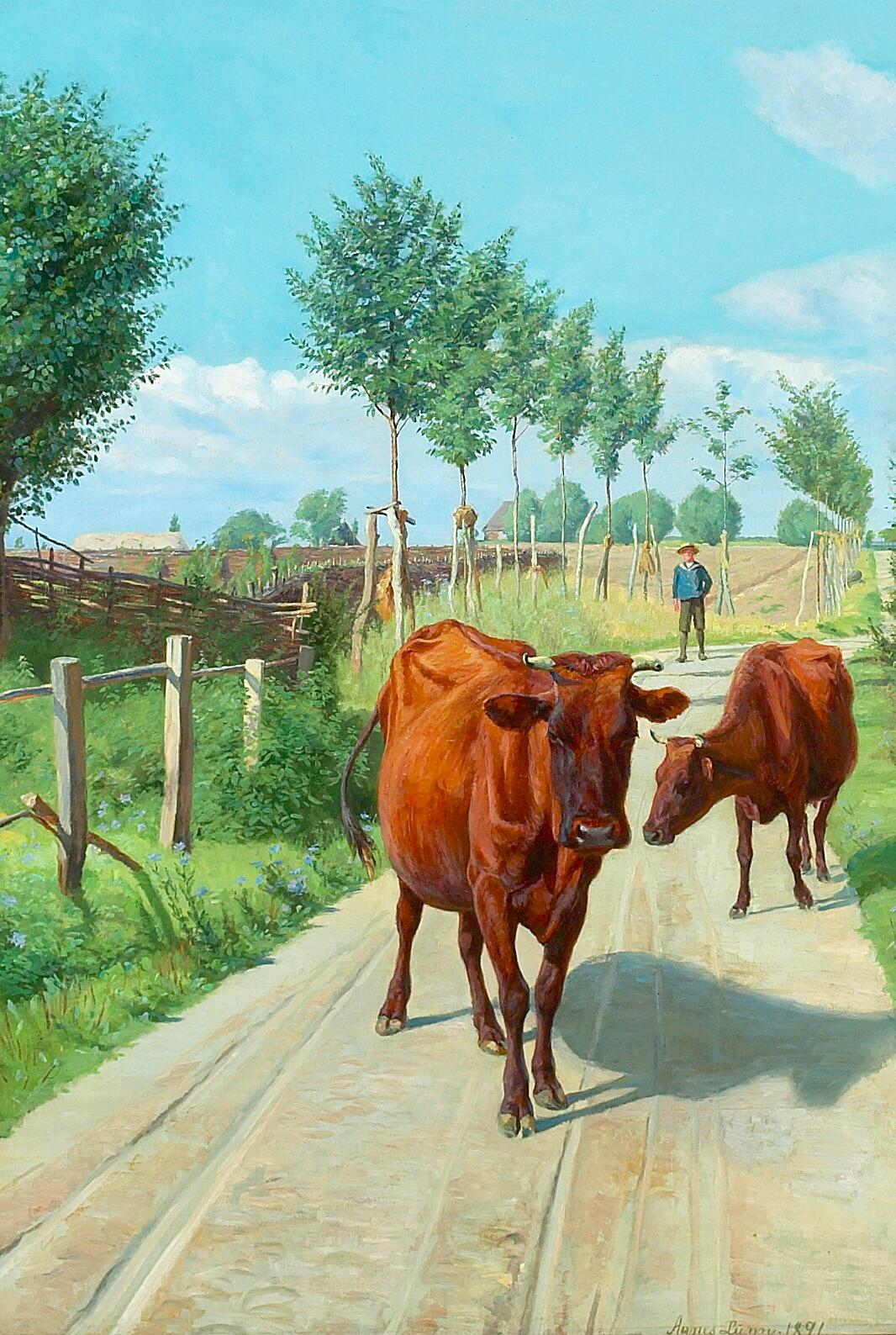
Køer på en vej nær Orehoved på Falster, oil on canvas, 1891

Agnes Cathinka Wilhelmine Lunn (16 March 1850 – 12 December 1941) was a Danish painter and sculptor. Lunn's work focused on depictions of domestic animals, particularly Icelandic horses. She also produced landscape paintings and architectural studies. Her most notable sculptures include: Hamlette (bronze statuette, 1899), Two Swimming Horses (bronze statuette, 1906, David Collection), and Resting Cow (1913, the Museum at Sønderborg Castle).

During her career, Lunn advocated for greater recognition of women artists in Denmark. She was a signatory to the petition which led to the establishment of a women's art school at the Royal Danish Academy of Fine Arts and was the co-arranger of the 1895 Copenhagen Women's Exhibition. Like many female artists of her era, Lunn never married.

== Biography ==
Agnes Cathinka Wilhelmine Lunn was born on 16 March 1850 at Rønnebæksholm. Her parents, Frederikke Amalie Hagen and Villars Knudsen Lunn, were farmers, though her father later became an estate owner. The Lunn family was known for raising the Knabstrupper, and Lunn grew up around horses, developed an early interest in them, and frequently drew horses as a child. Her mother was a drafter, and encourage her to develop her artistic skills. After the death of her mother, her father did not support her pursuit of a career as an artist. She nevertheless trained as an artist with the encouragement of others.

Initially, Lunn was privately trained by Frederik Christian Lund and Otto Bache. She then made her artistic debut at the 1875 Charlottenborg Spring Exhibition with a painting of cows. She traveled to Paris in 1880 to study under Jean-Léon Gérôme, Léon Bonnat, and Jules Bastien-Lepage. While studying with Bonnat between 1880 and 1881, Lunn became acquainted with another student of his, Joakim Skovgaard. Several years later, in 1896, they traveled together to Greece. She remained in Greece for several months, producing watercolor paintings and the oil painting Erechtheions østgavl, Akropolis. In addition to Skovgaard, she is known to have had a close relationship with Anne Marie Carl-Nielsen.

Lunn attended the art school for women at the Royal Danish Academy of Fine Arts, which she had helped establish in 1888. The Folketing had been pressured to found the school following a petition, which Lunn had supported and signed. While studying at the academy's women's school, she studied modelling, and developed her skills as a sculptor. In 1895, she co-arranged the 1895 Copenhagen Women's Exhibition in an effort to help women artists achieve recognition in Denmark. Her work was also exhibited at the Danish National Exhibition of 1909. A small exhibition of her sculptures and paintings was held at The David Collection in 2016.

She died on 12 December 1941 in Copenhagen and was buried at Sønder Jernløse Church in Holbæk Municipality.

== Gallery ==
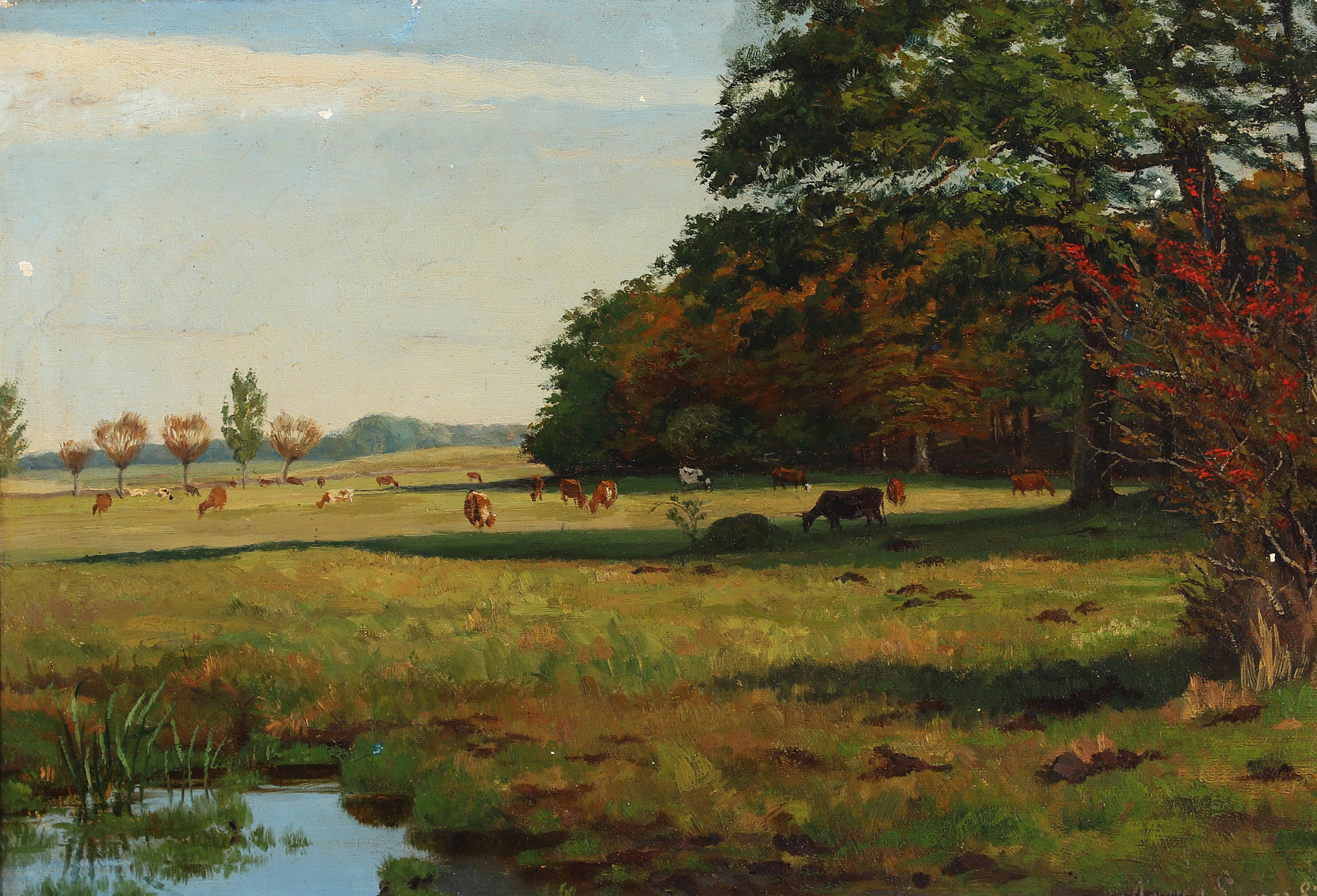
Landskab med Køer ved Kanten af en Sø, oil on canvas, 1883

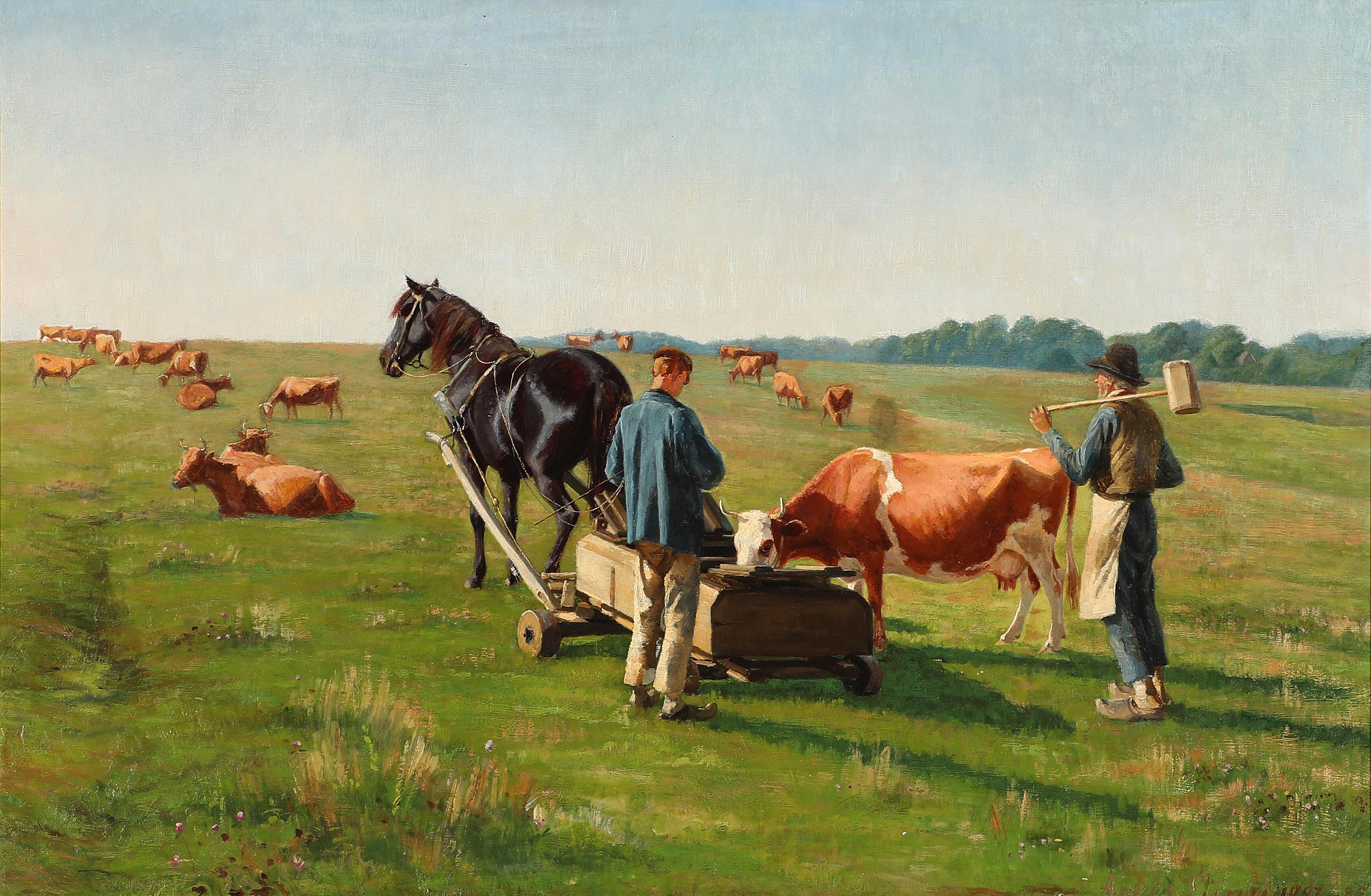
Ved Vandvognen. September-Eftermiddag, oil on canvas, c. 1883–85

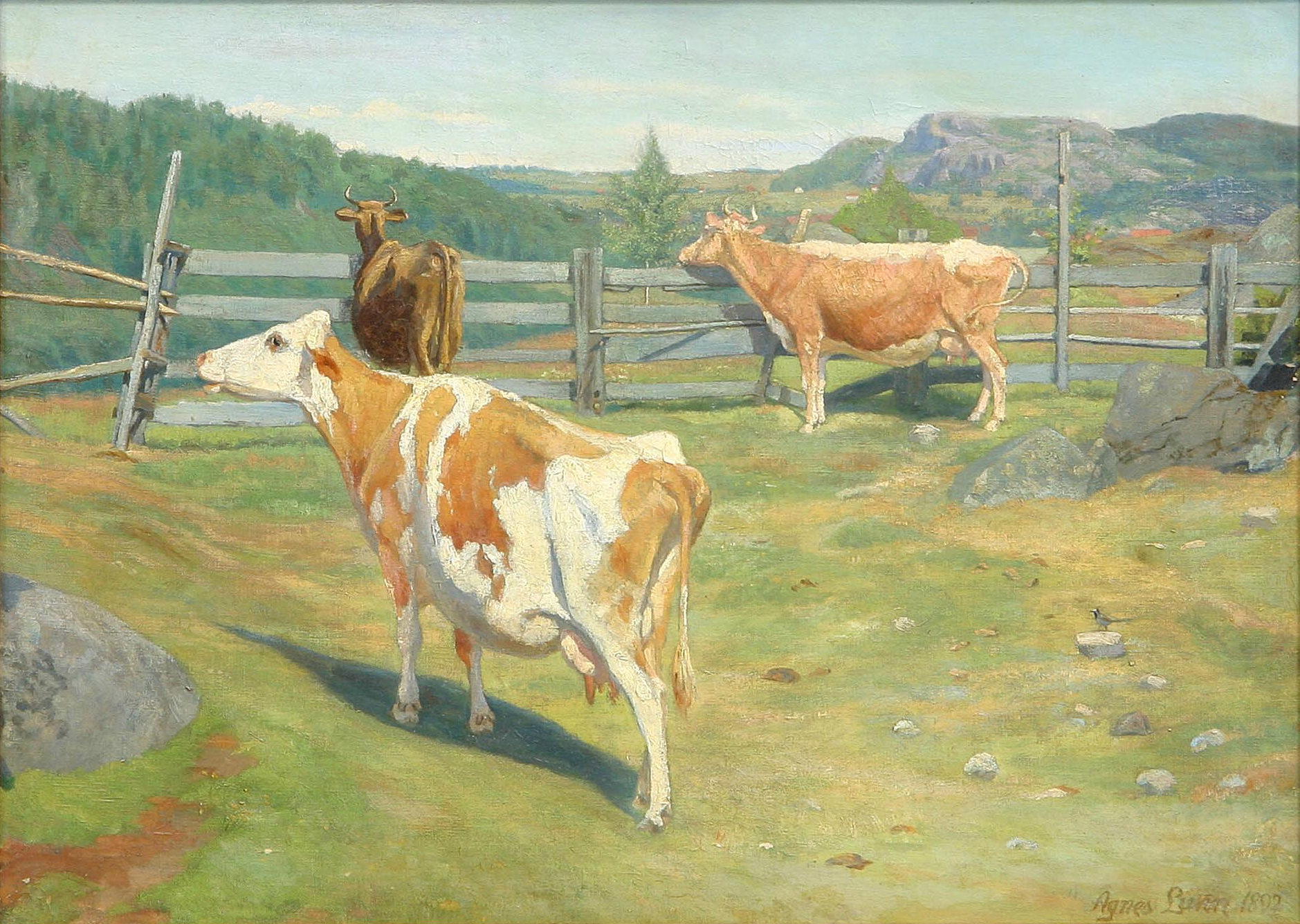
Køer ved et markled, oil on canvas, 1892

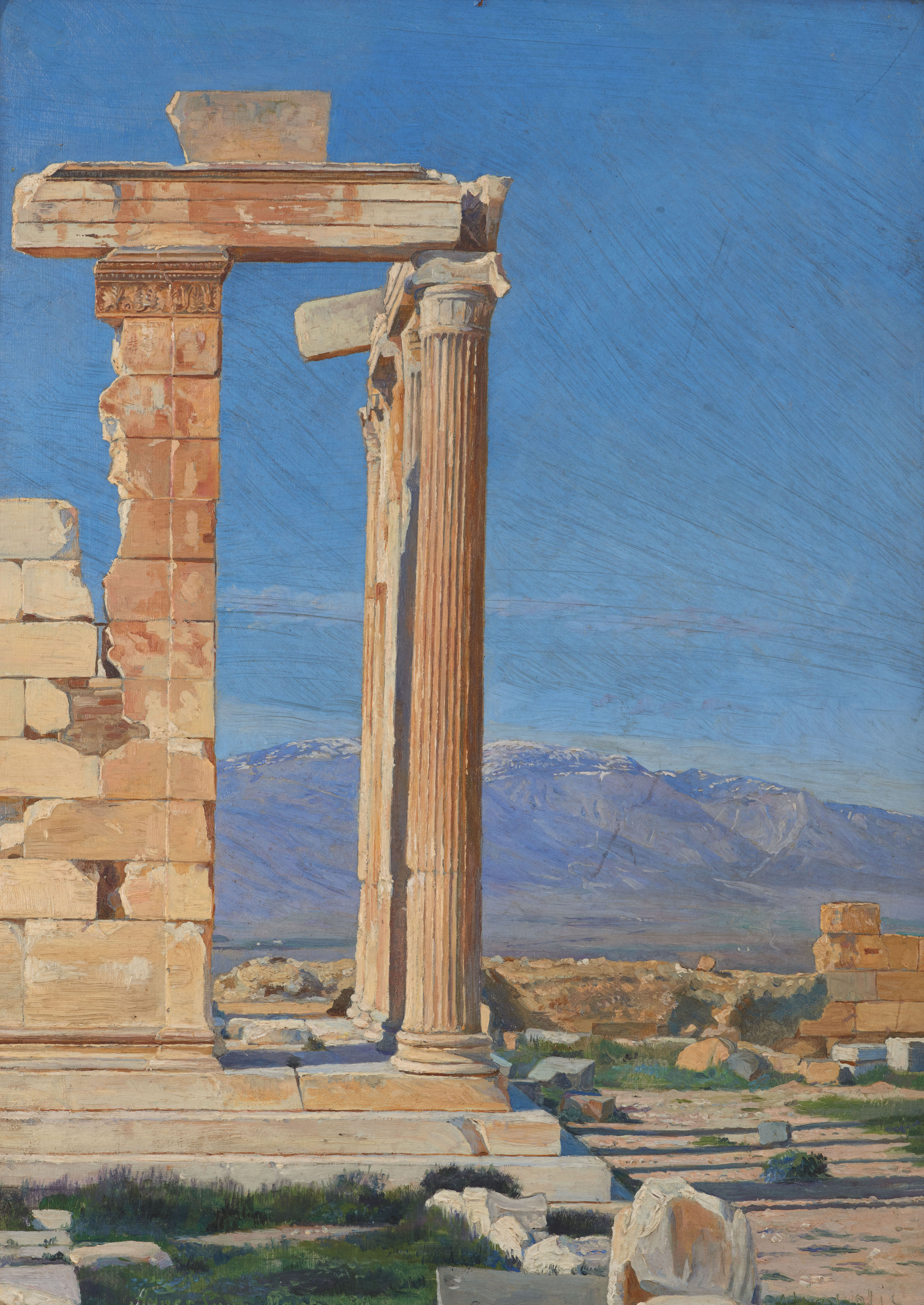
Erechtheions østgavl, Akropolis, oil on cardboard, 1896

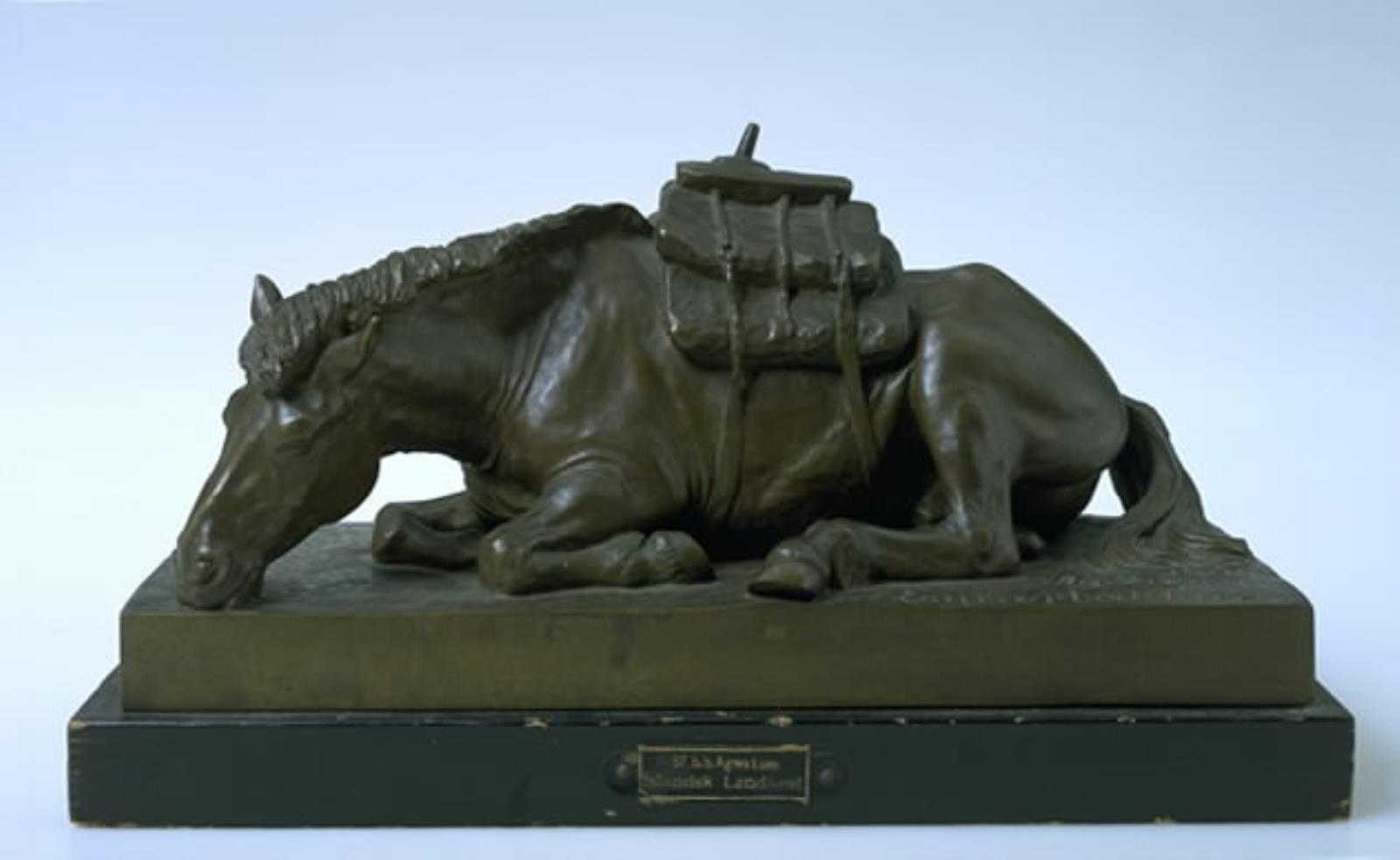
Hvilende islandsk lasthest, bronze, 1904

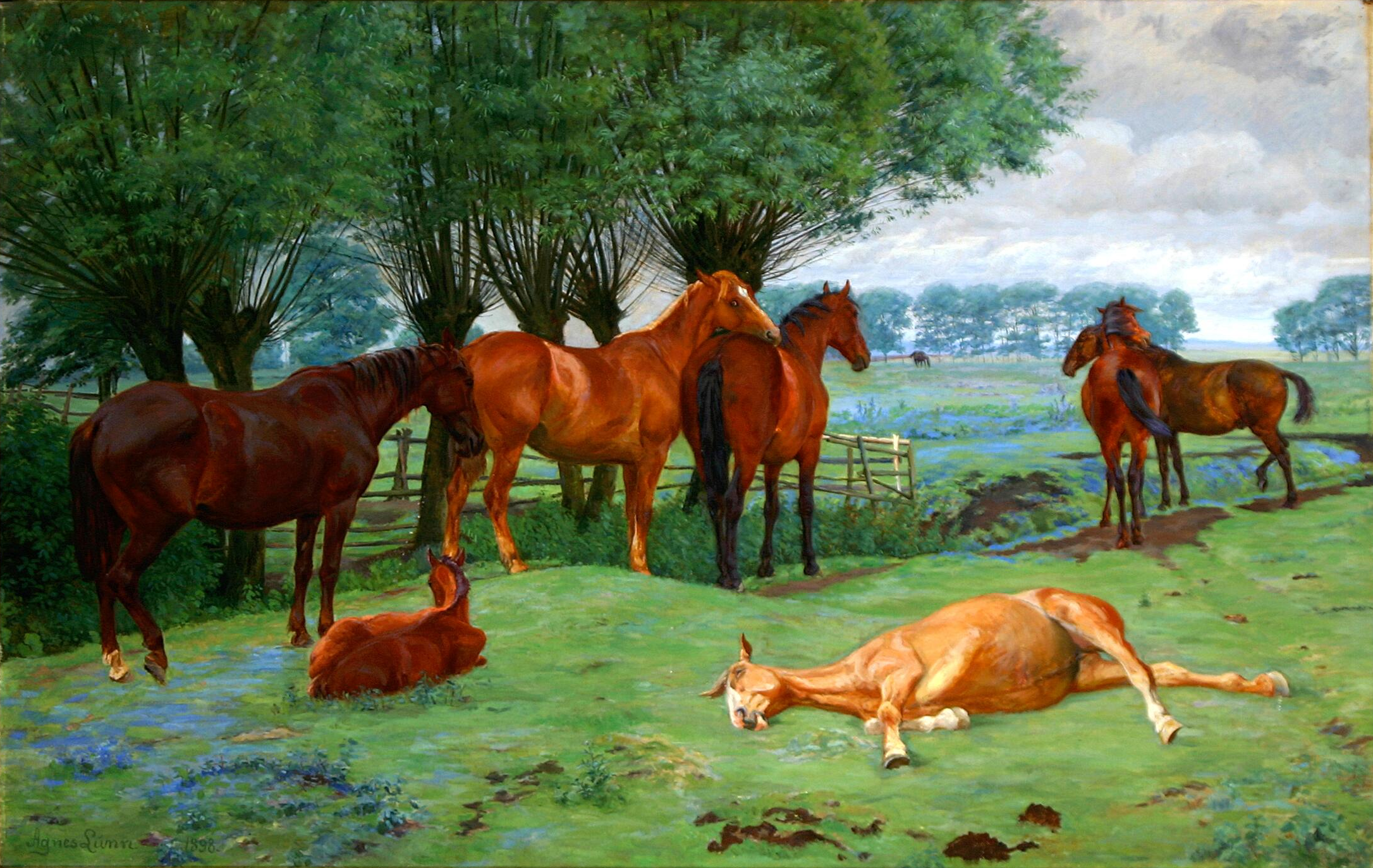
Heste på en eng, oil on canvas
