= Louise Bonfils =

Danish painter

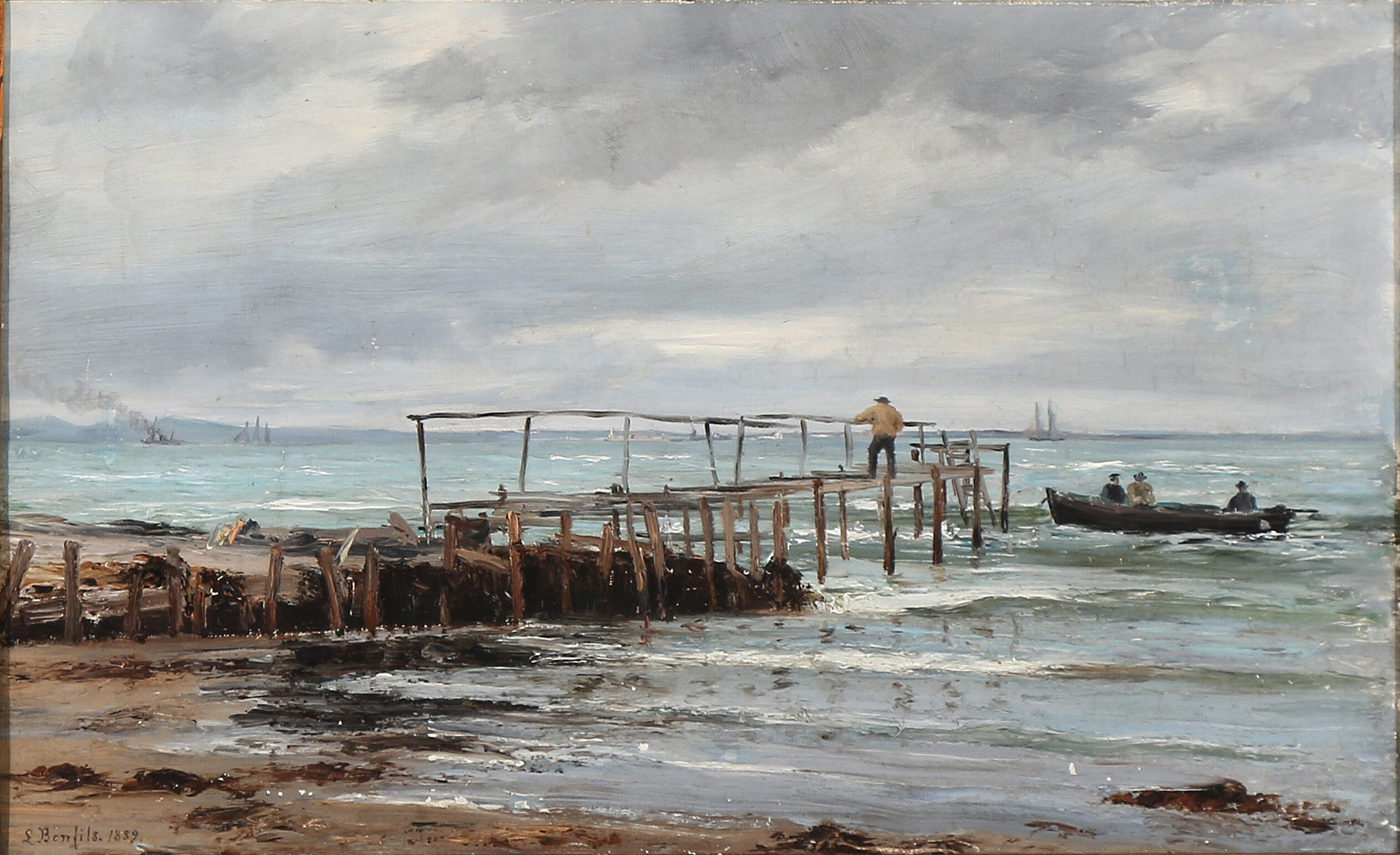
"Coastal scene with fishermen at a pier", 1889 – Ålsgårde with Kullen in the background

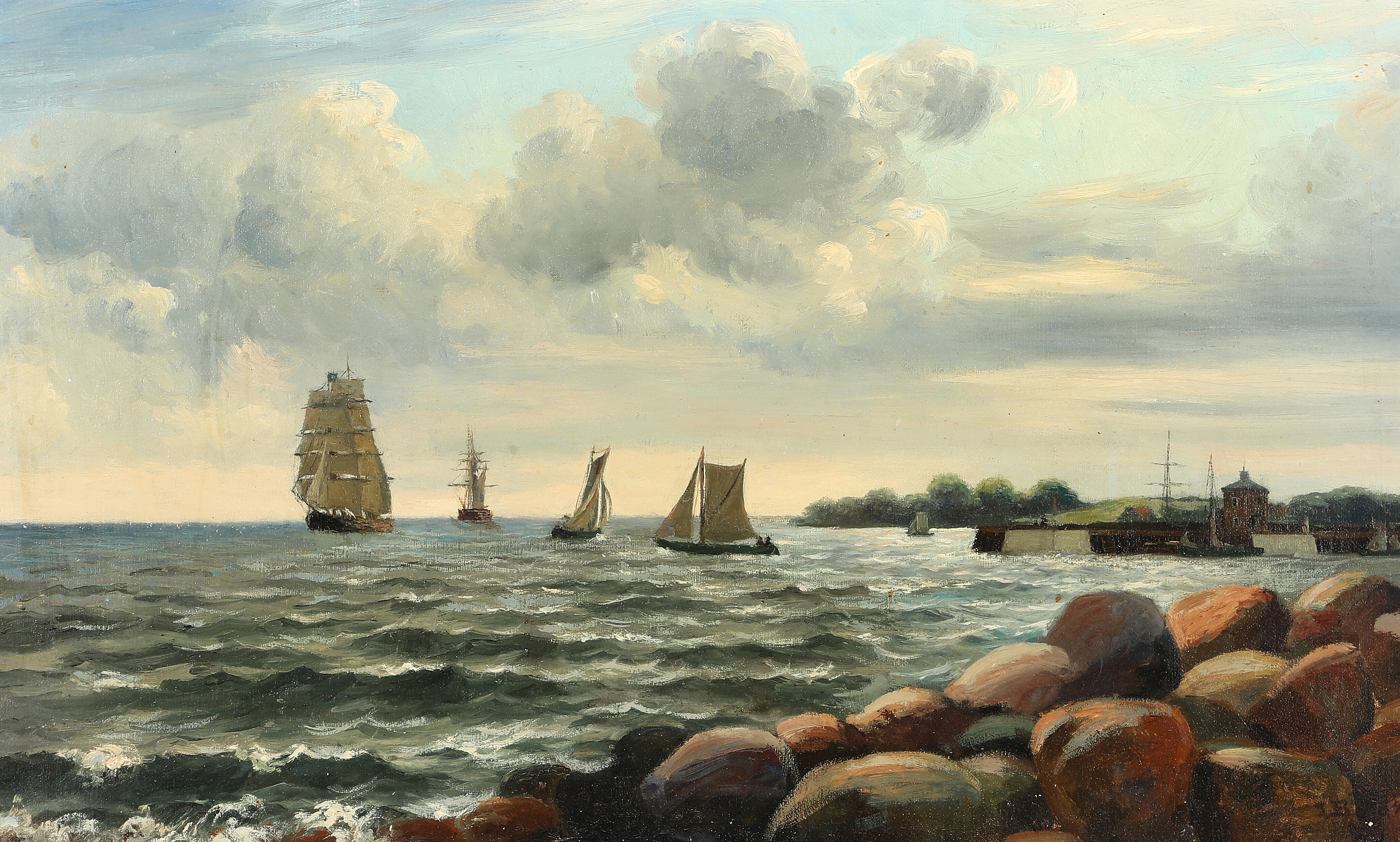
Rocky coast with ships and sailing boats, 1884

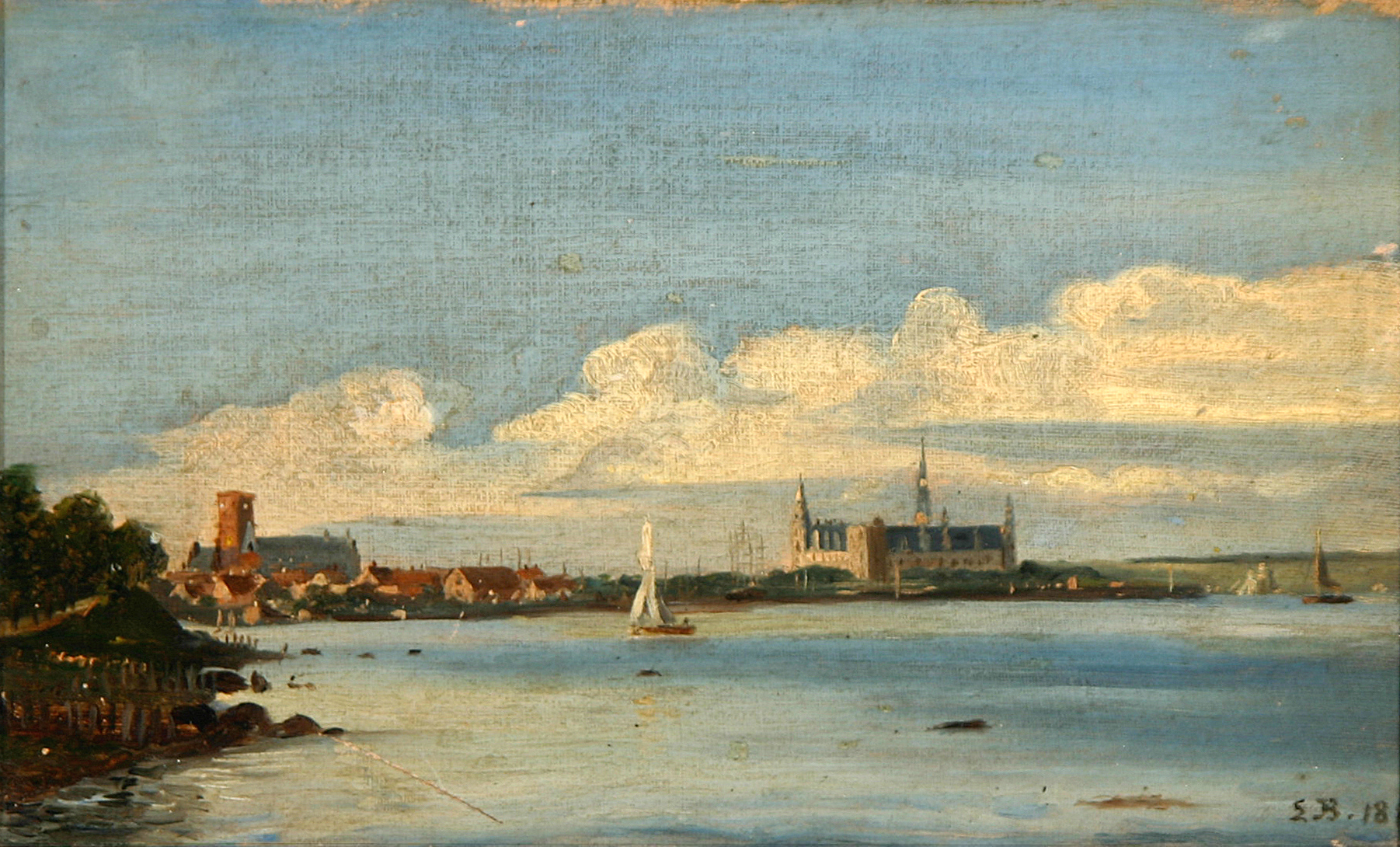
The coast south of Helsingør with Kronborg Slot and Skt. Olai Kirke, 1882

Louise Marie Magdalene Bonfils (3 November 1856 - 28 March 1933) was a Danish painter, best-known for her seascapes despite a serious eye disease.

She was born in Frederiksberg to head-of-office (later director) of the Militære Underklasses Invalideforsørgelsen Carl Josef Julius Bonfils (1814–1901) and Elisabeth Juliane Louise née Soelberg (1815–1884). Her brother, Sophus Carl Emmanuel Bonfils, trained as a bookseller at G.E.C. Gad, owned a bookshop and from 1893 to 1896 was chairman of the Copenhagen Booksellers Association.

According to the official censuses in Copenhagen, Louise Bonfils lived with her father and brothers in her childhood home on Gammel Kongevej until 1901, after which she moved to the Kunstnerhjemmet in Gothersgade. Here she lived next door to another well-known marine painter, Vilhelm Arnesen. She died unmarried in Copenhagen and is buried at Solbjerg Park Cemetery in Frederiksberg.

== Gallery ==
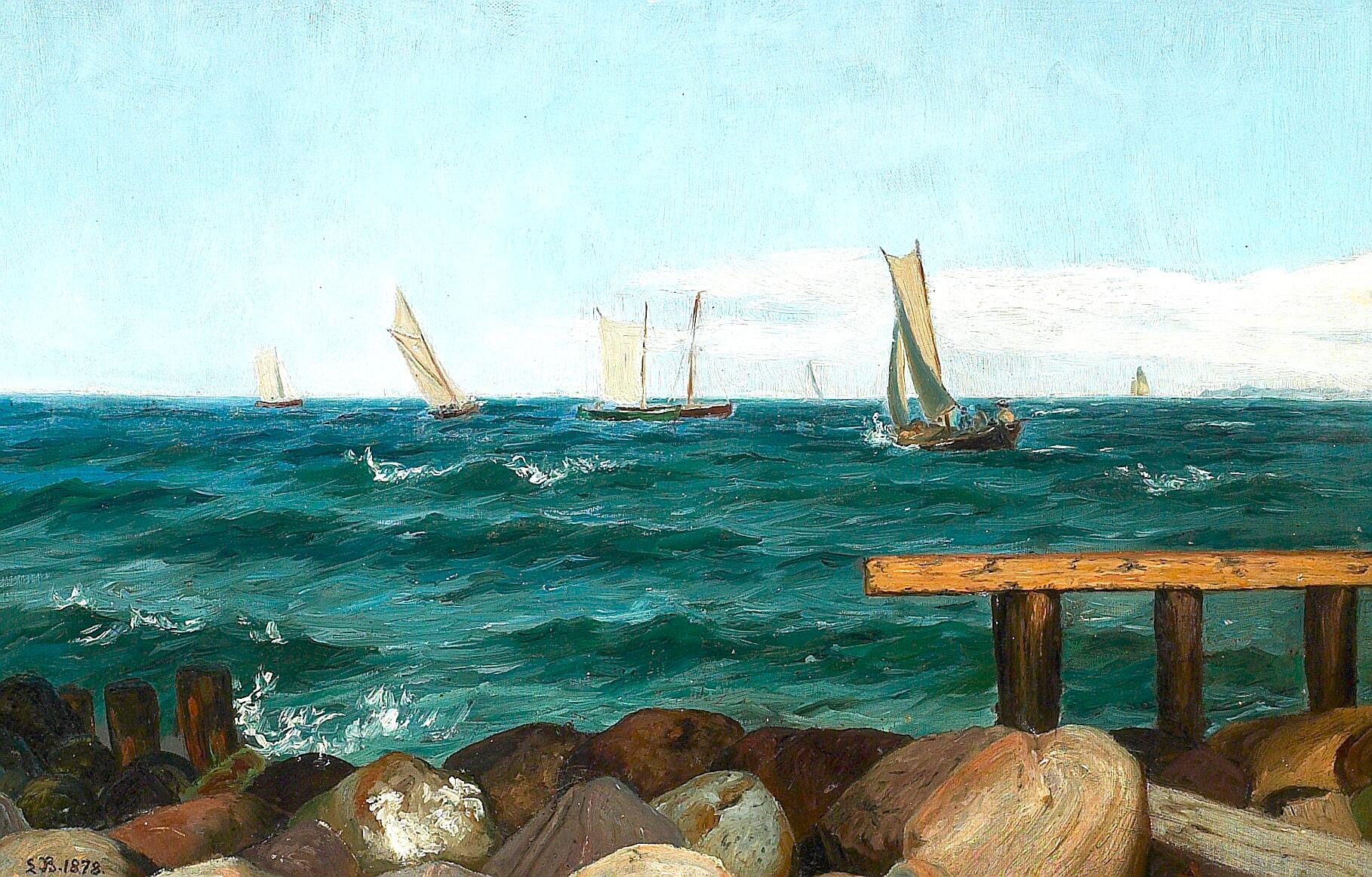
Ships on the Sundet on a summer day, 1878

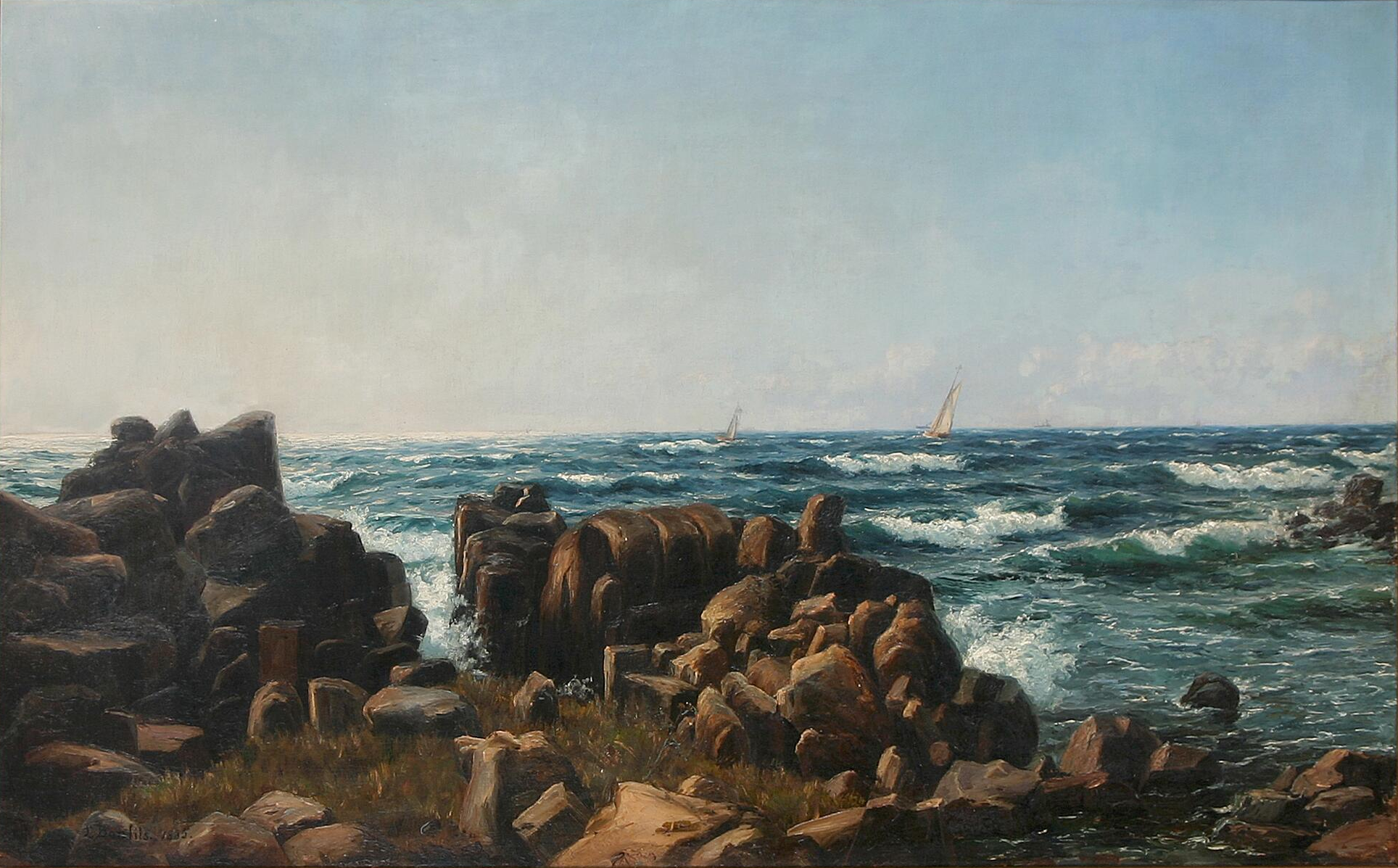
Sailing boats off a rocky coast, 1885

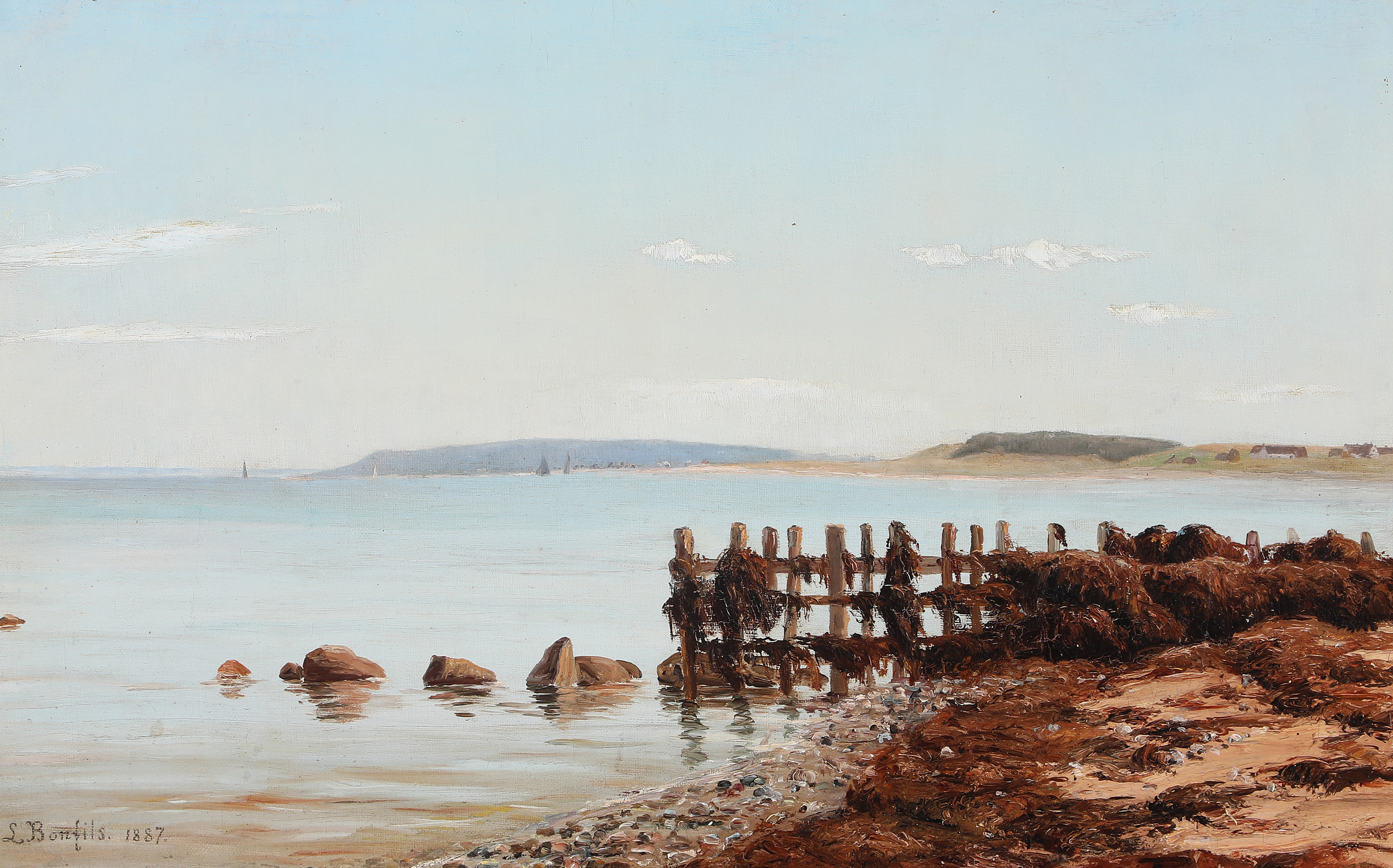
Coast, 1887

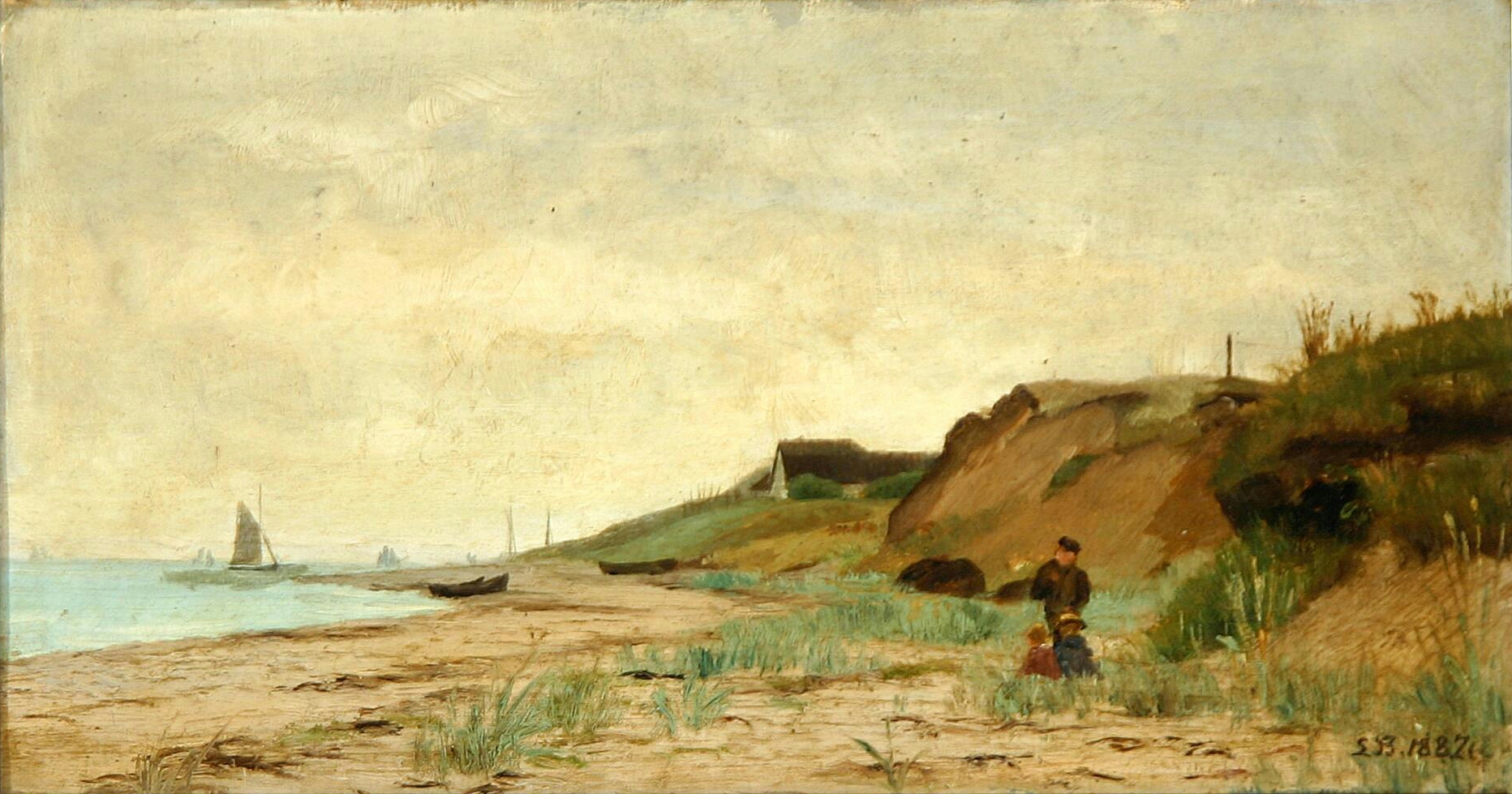
Coast with small boats on the shoreline, 1887

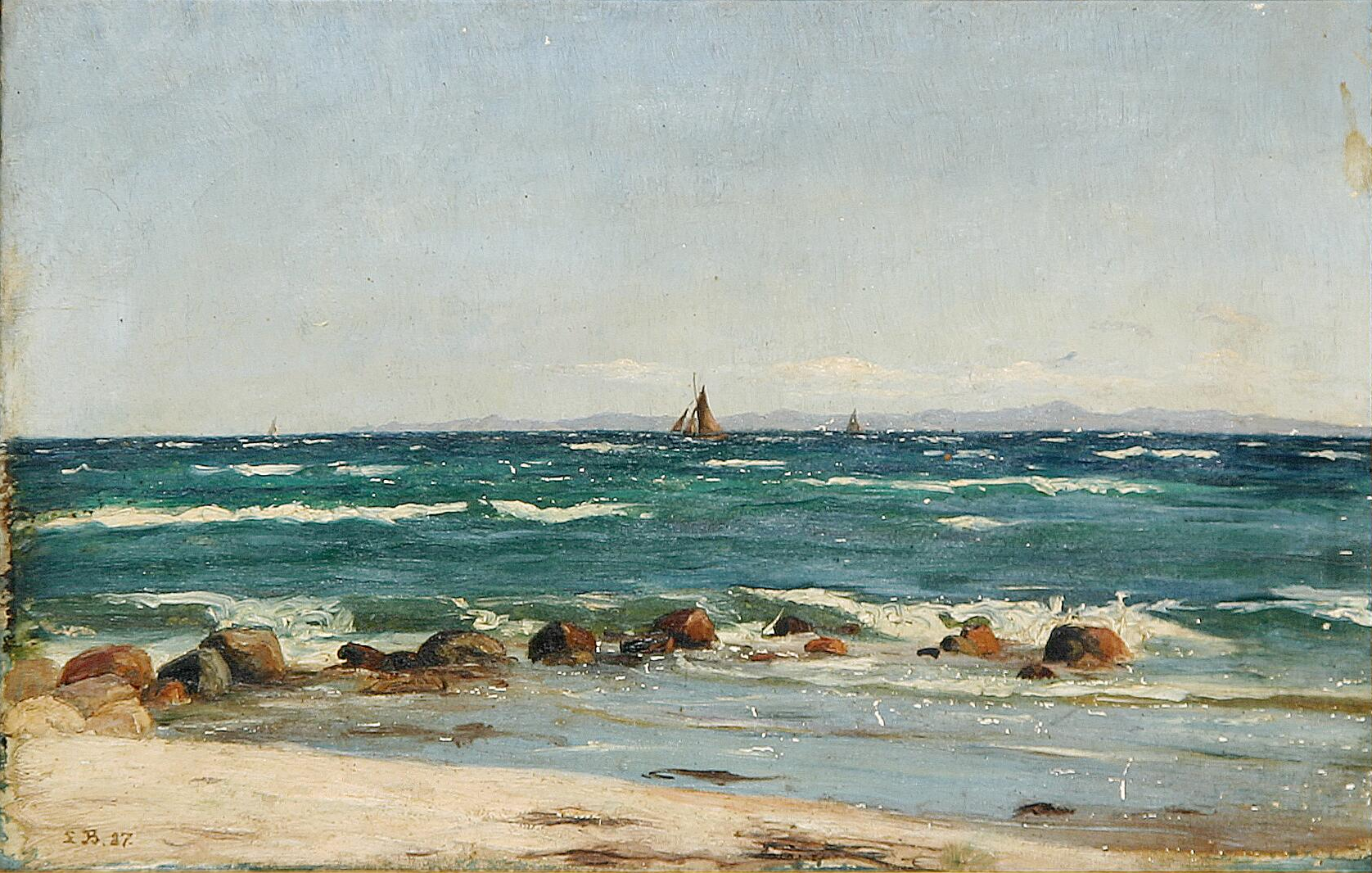
Beach in Villingebæk, Nordsjælland, 1887

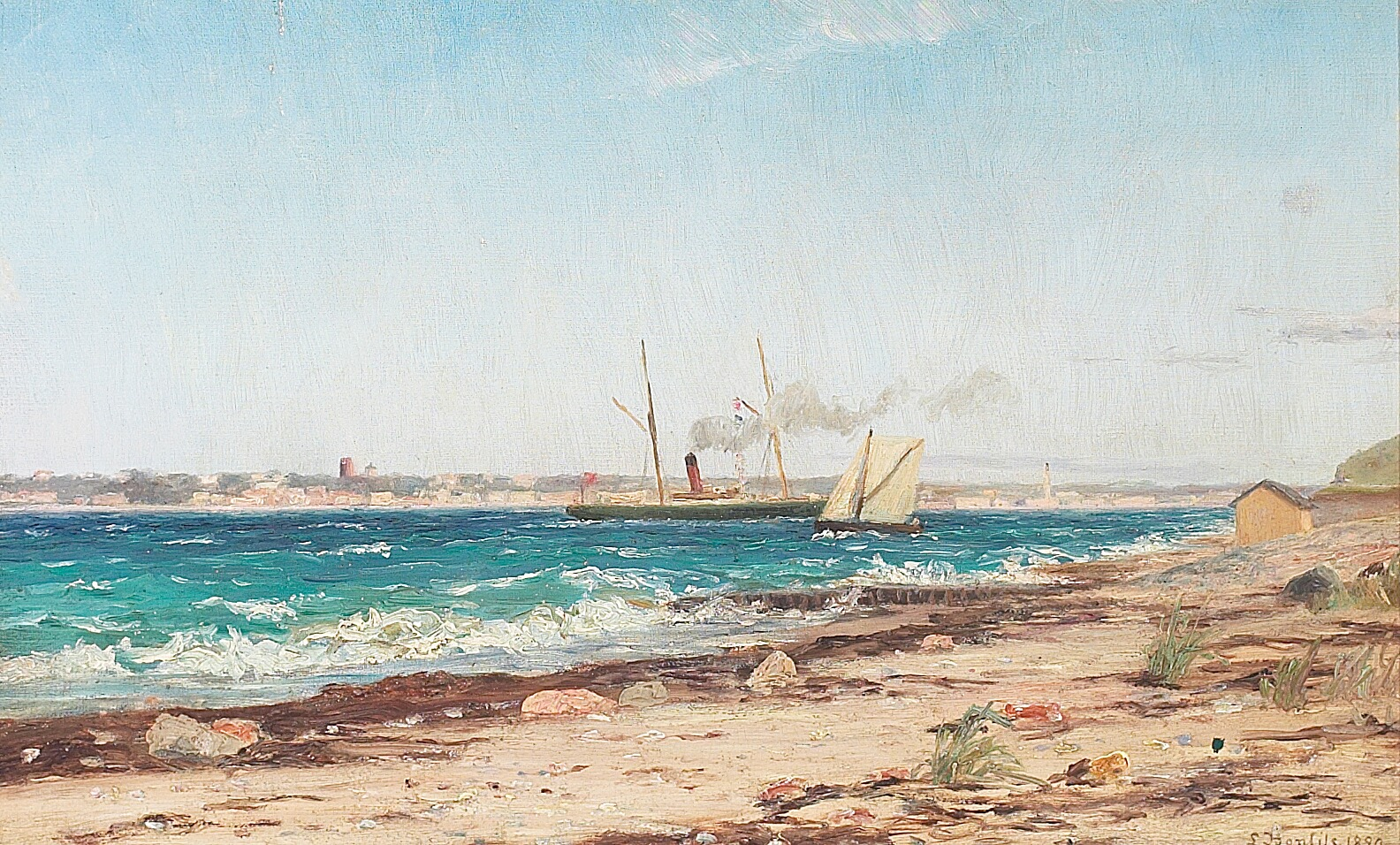
Coast with sailing ships and steamships off Kronborg beach, 1890

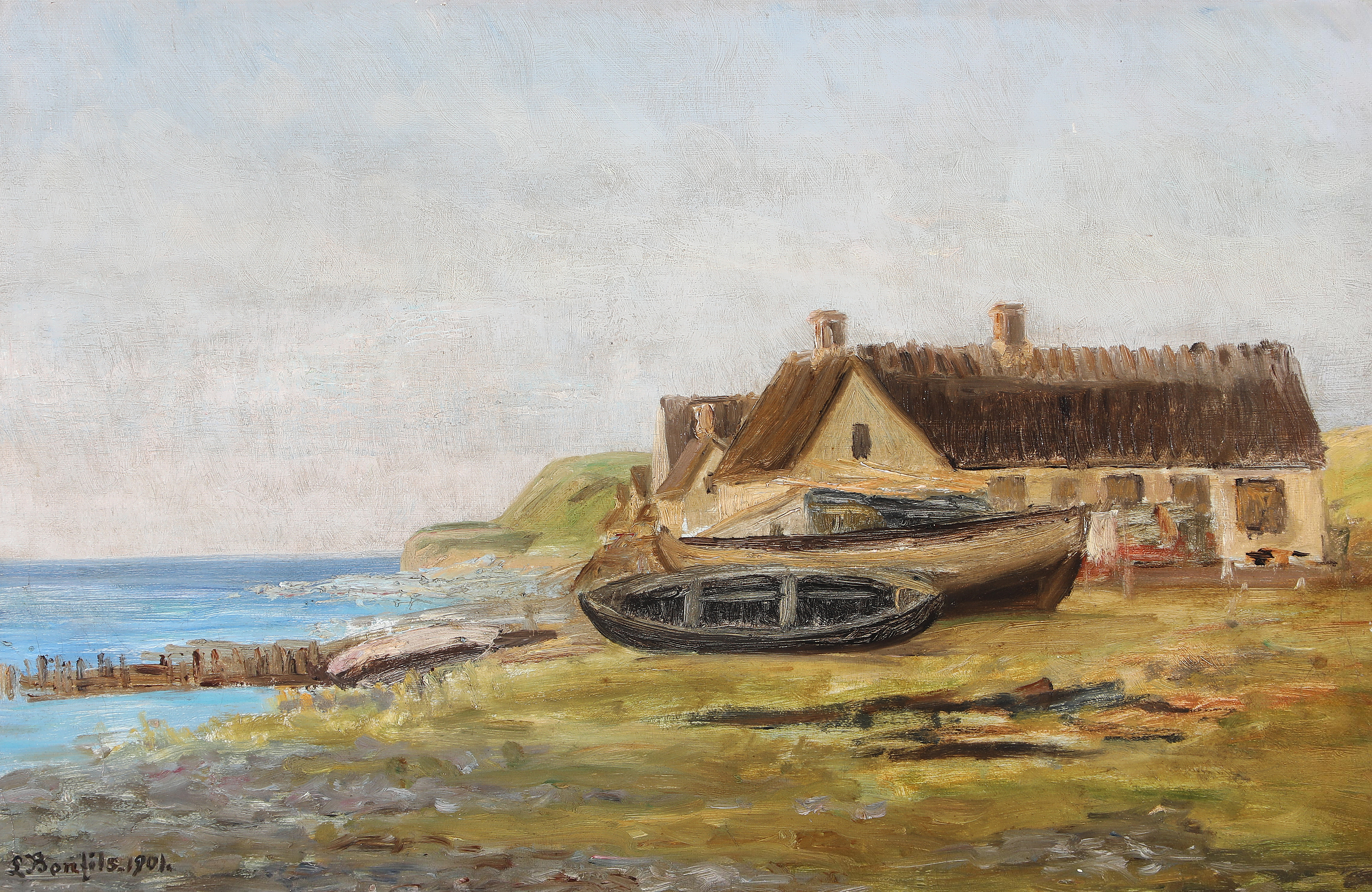
Coast with house and boats, 1901

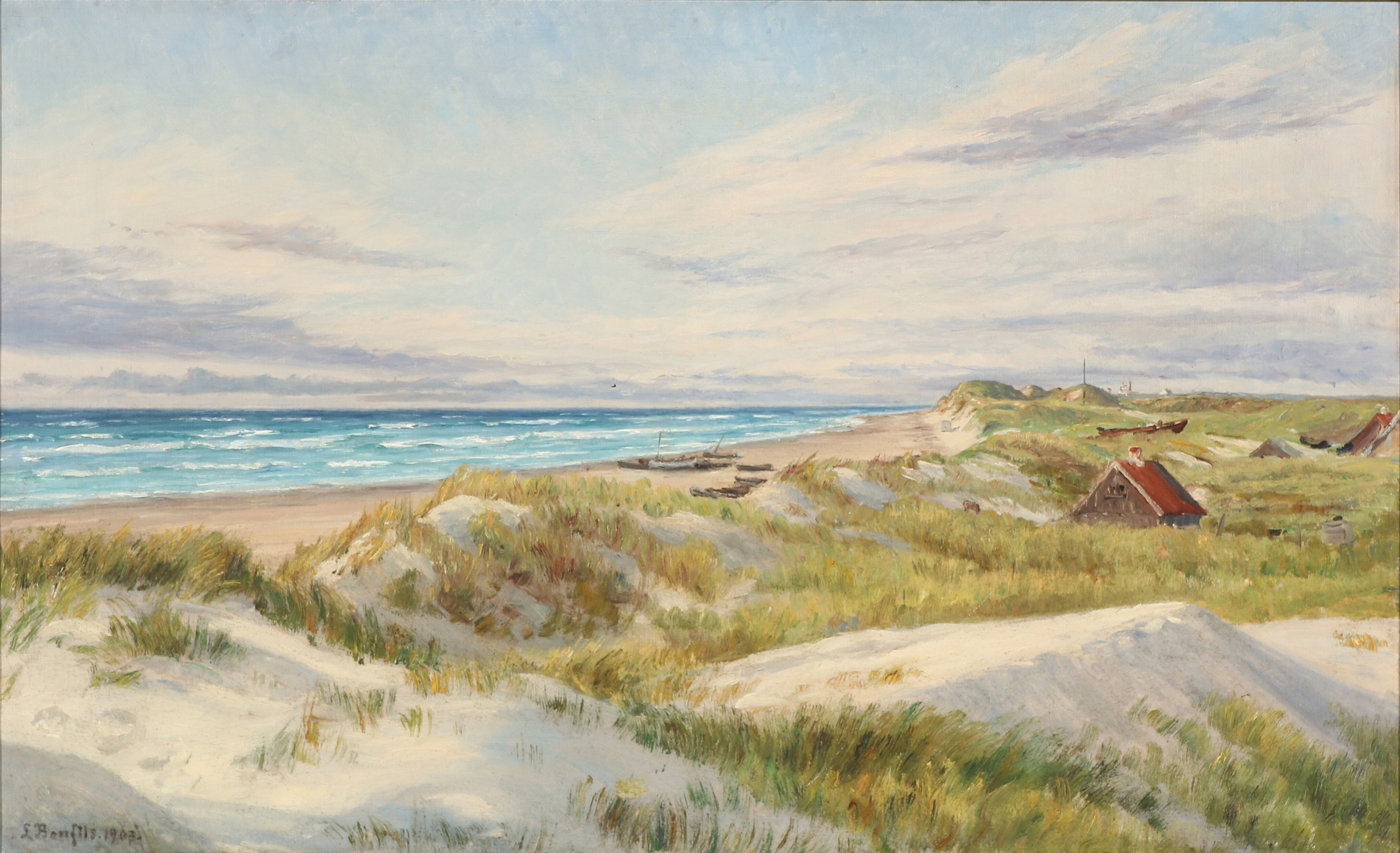
Coast from Gammel Skagen. Eftermiddag, 1903

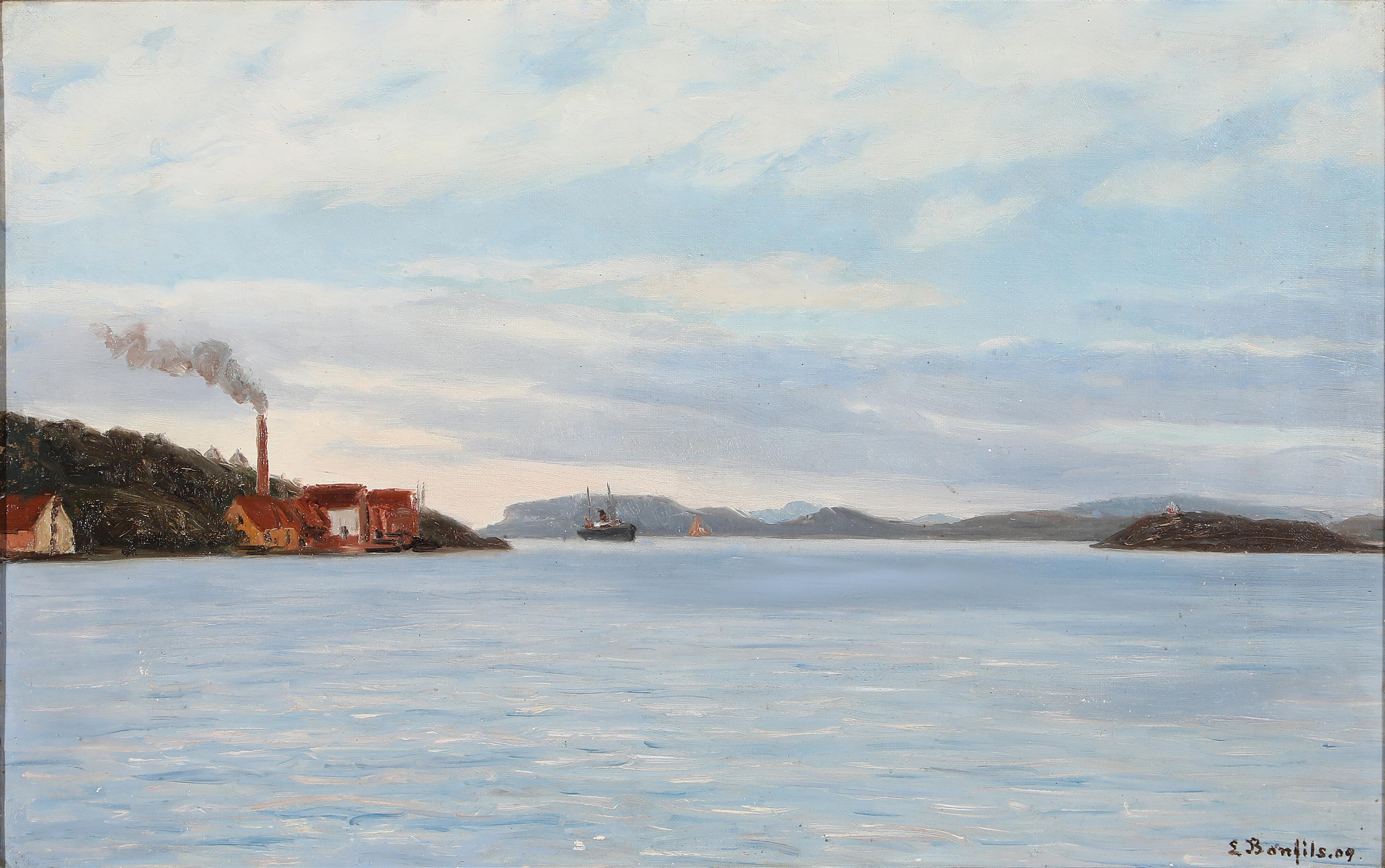
Evening
Stavanger Fjord, 1909

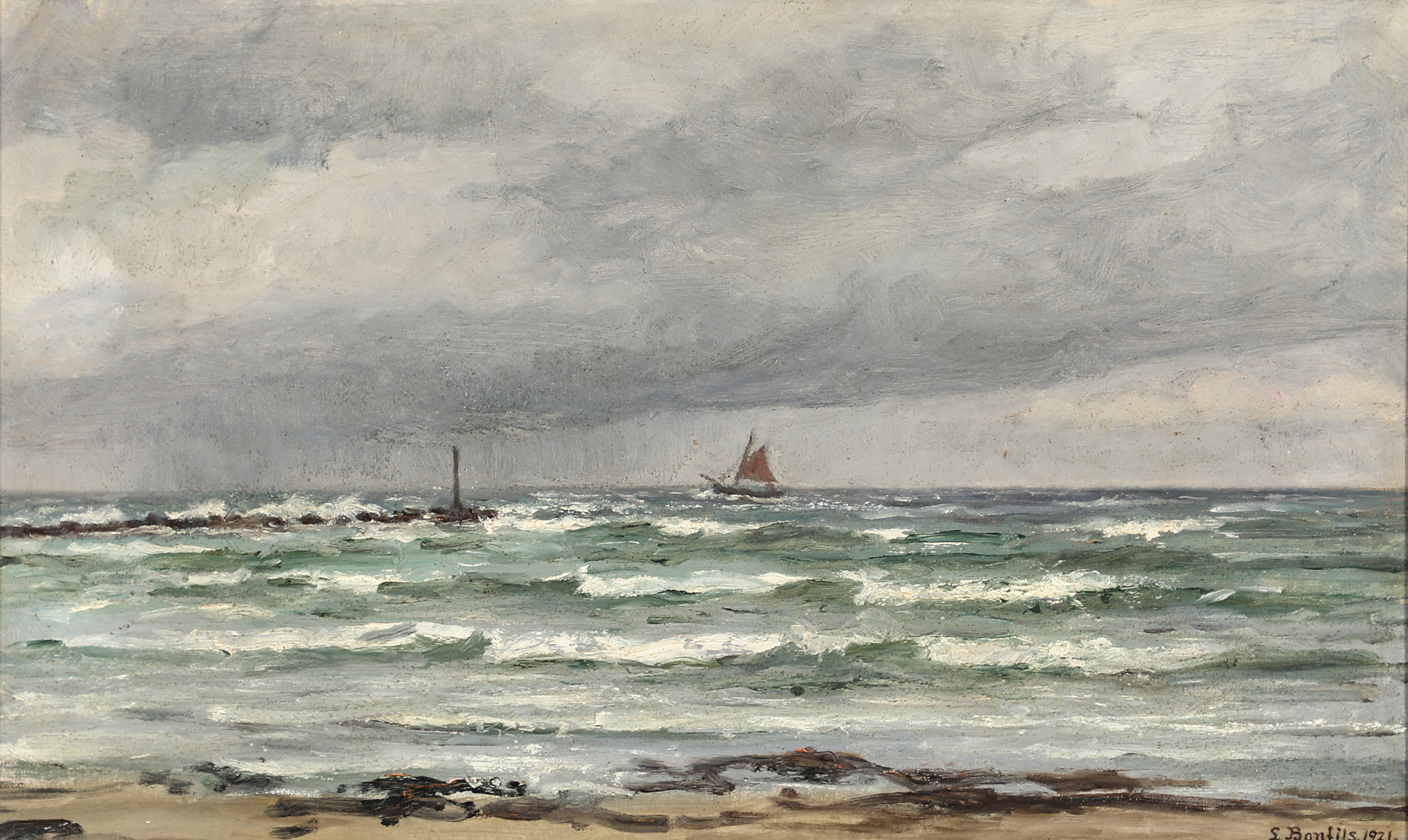
Showers at Hornbæk, 1921

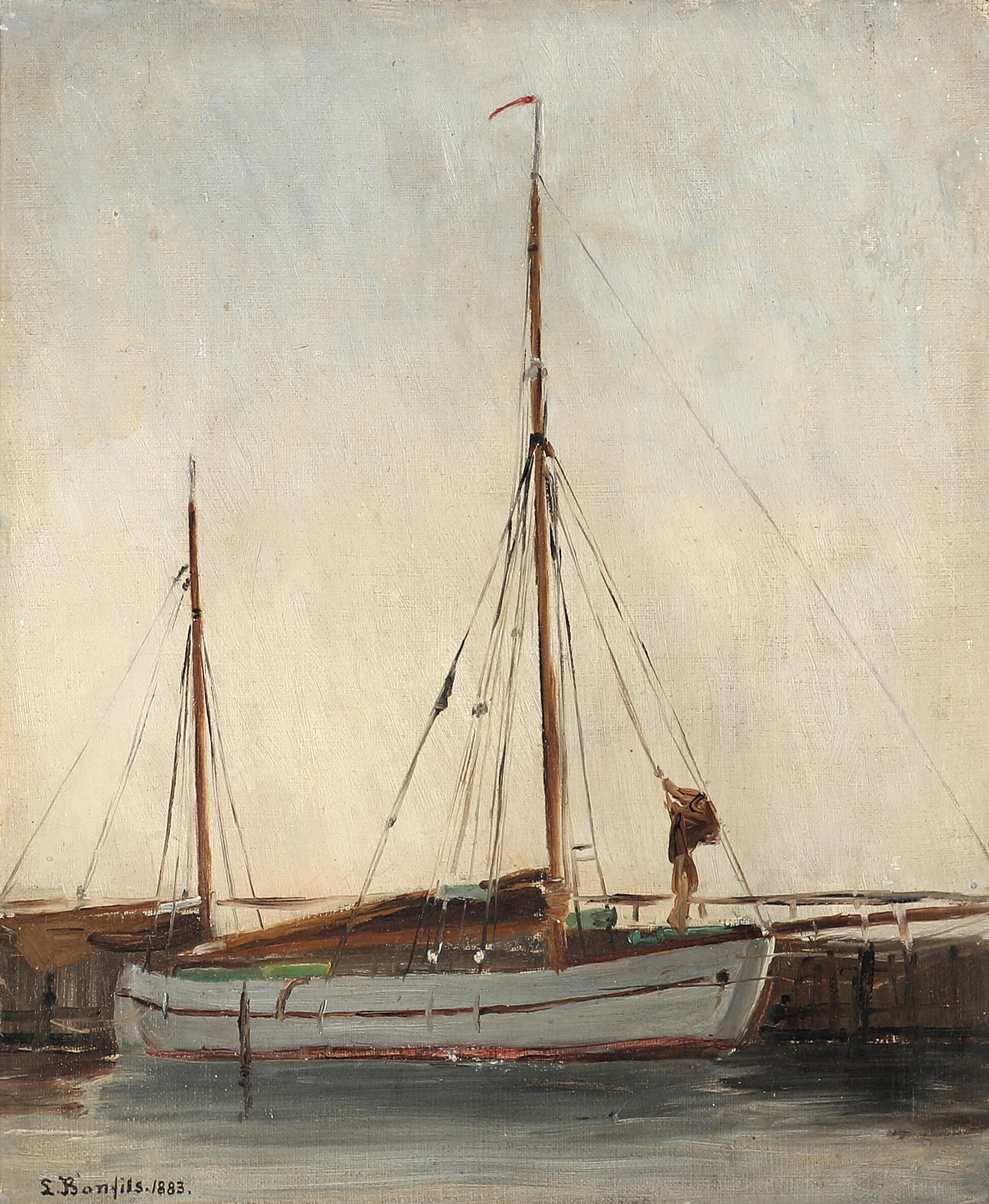
Harbour with two small sailing ships, 1883

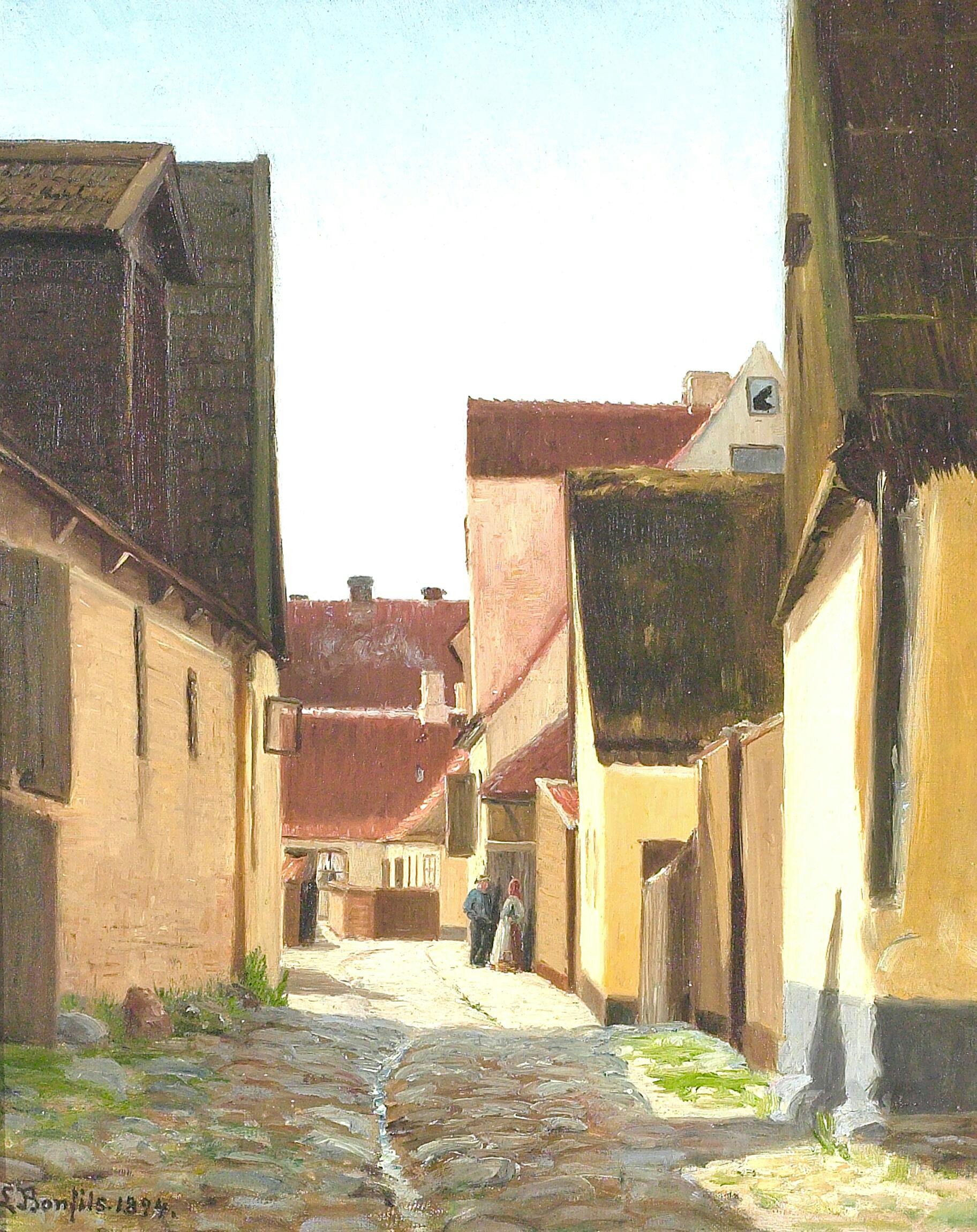
People in conversation on a sunlit street in Dragør, 1894

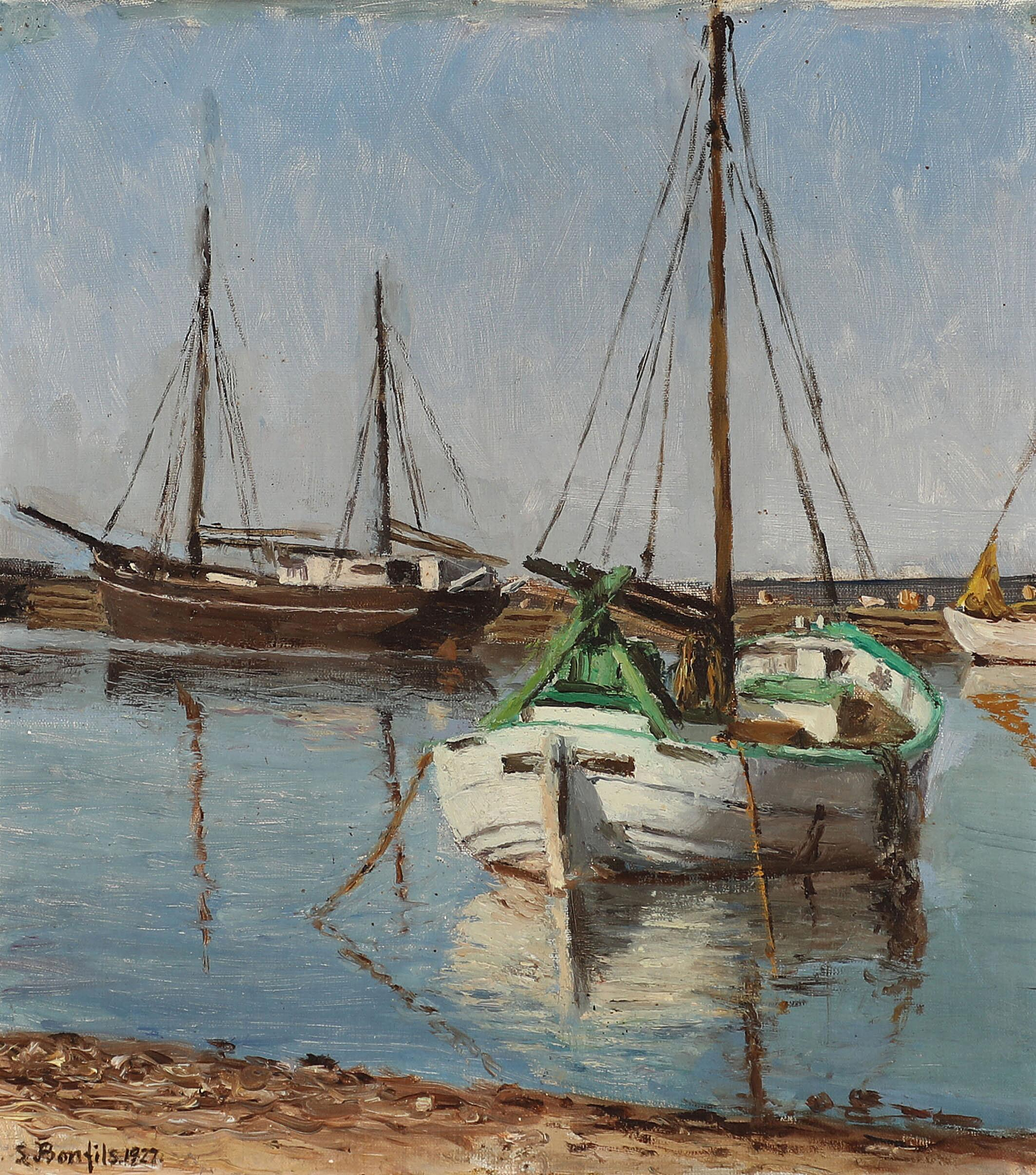
Boats in Gilleleje harbour, 1927
