= Augusta Dohlmann =

Danish painter

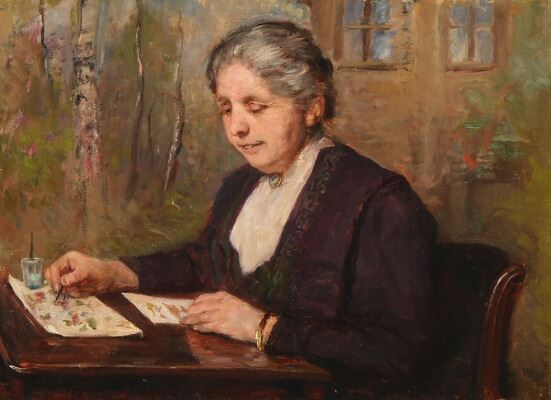
- Dohlmann painted at her drawingtable by Bertha Wegmann.
- Born: 9 May 1847; Frederiksberg, Denmark
- Died: 22 June 1914 (aged 57); Skotterup, Denmark
- Known for: Painting

Augusta Dohlmann also known as Henriette Augusta Johanne Dohlmann (9 May 1847 – 22 June 1914) was a Danish painter. She was known for her flower painting.

== Biography ==
Dohlmann was born in Frederiksberg on 9 May 1847. In 1878 she traveled to Paris to study French and painting. She returned to Denmark in 1880 when she exhibited at the Charlottenborg Spring Exhibition, where she would exhibit annually. Throughout her lifetime she would make several trips to Europe.

Dohlmann was active in the formation of the Kunstakademiets Kunstskole for Kvinder (the Art Academy's Art School for Women) in Copenhagen which open in 1888. In 1901 she became the first female member of the Board of the Kunstnerforeningen. In the mid-1890s she taught drawing and painting in Gothersgade.

Dohlmann exhibited her work at the Palace of Fine Arts at the 1893 World's Columbian Exposition in Chicago, Illinois.

She died in Skotterup on 22 June 1914.

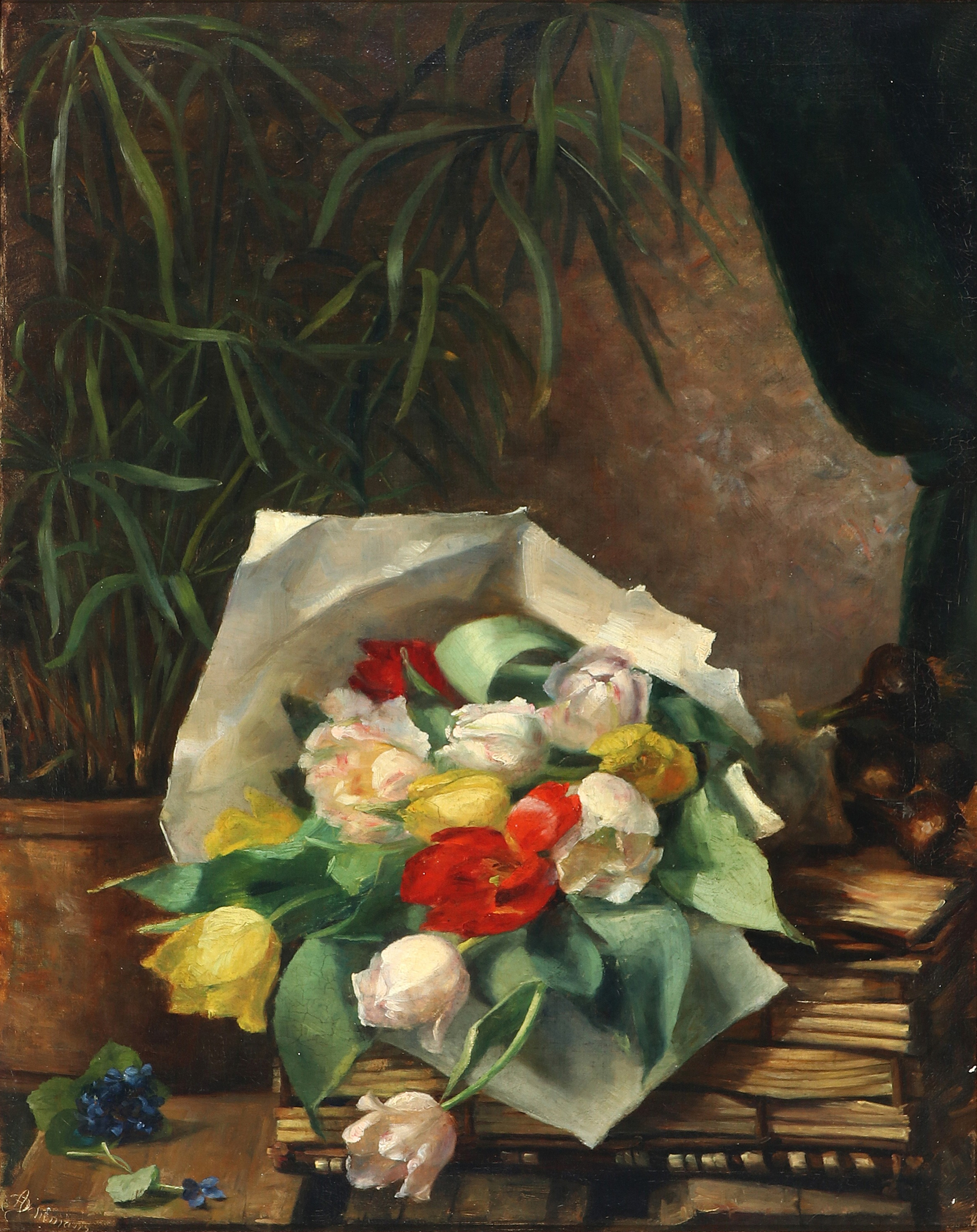
Augusta Dohlmann, Still-life with colourful tulips on a table
