= Julie Lütken =

Danish painter (1788–1816)

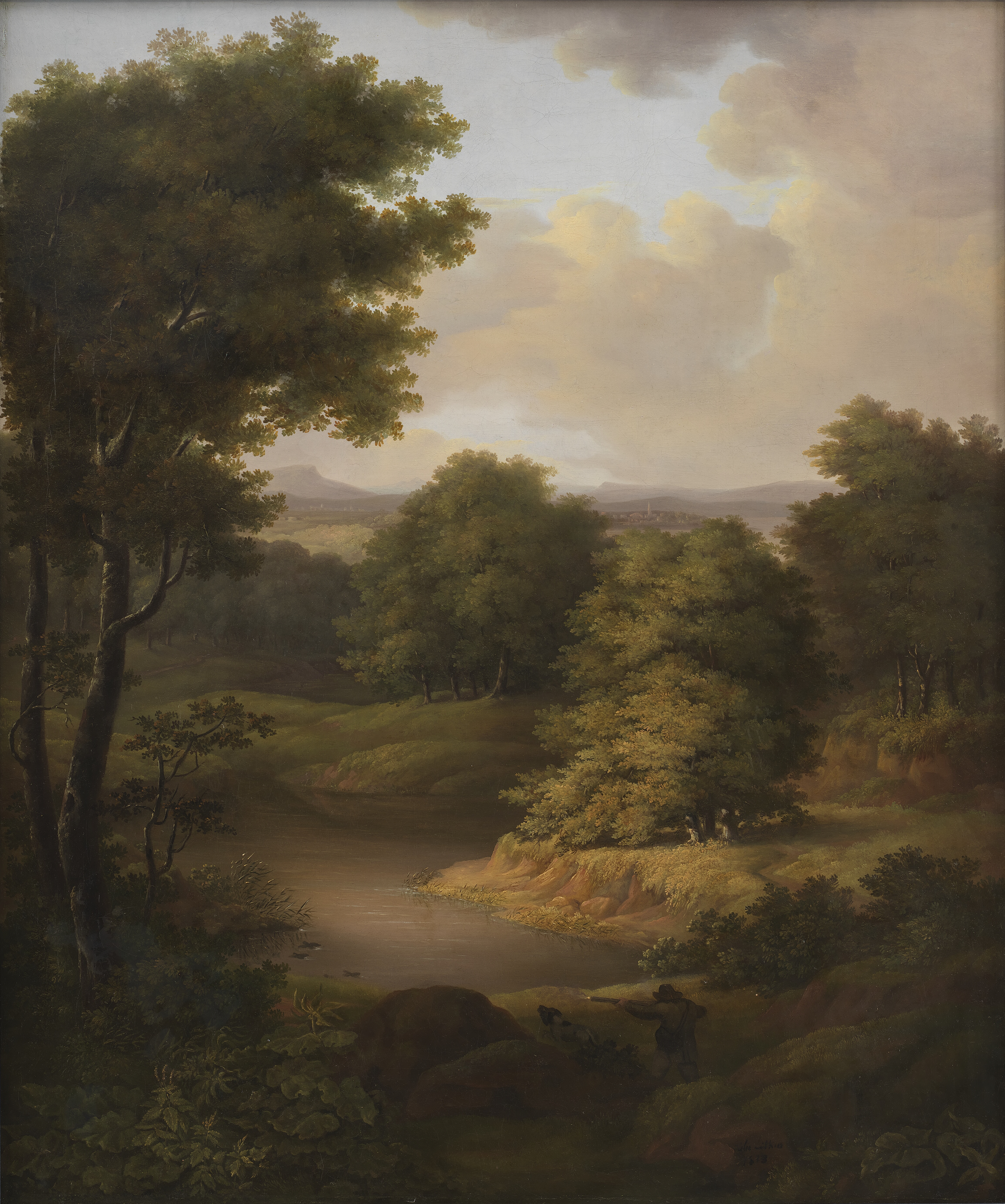
"Duck Shooting in a Wooded Landscape", painting by Julie Lütken (1813)

Marie Dorethea Juliane (Julie) Lütken (1788–1816) was a Danish painter who specialized in landscapes. Unusually for her times when women were not admitted to the Academy, thanks to the private instruction she received from Claudius Mørch, Carl Frederik Vogt and above all Johan Ludwig Lund, she was able to exhibit at the Charlottenborg Spring Exhibition in 1815. She died in May 1816 when only 28 after jumping out of a carriage drawn by a horse which had run wild.

== Biography ==
Born in Copenhagen on 23 March 1788, Marie Dorethea Juliane Lütken was the daughter of the wholesale merchant Christian Ludvig Lütken (1750–1813) from Hamburg and his wife Marie Juliane Johanne née Schinmeyer (1765–1832) from Stettin. The eldest of the family's three children, she married the merchant Christian Grevsen in August 1804 but the marriage was dissolved. In June 1815, she married the merchant Johannes Overbeck.

Lütken received private instruction in drawing from Claudius Mørch (1759–1813) before studying painting under Carl Frederik Vogt (1781–1834) and Johan Ludwig Lund (1777–1867) of the Royal Academy. From their correspondence, it appears that Lund developed a romantic relationship with her.

In 1815, Lütken presented six fine landscape paintings at the Charlottenborg Spring Exhibition reminiscent of the style of Jens Juel. As a result, she received unanimous approval for membership of the academy.

After marrying Overbeck in June 1815, she moved with him to Hamburg where she began work on a Zealand landscape which was intended to be her acceptance painting as a member of the academy. It was never completed. On 1 May 1816, Julie Lütken died in Hamburg after jumping out of a carriage drawn by a horse which had run wild.

Three of Lütken's paintings form part of the collection of Statens Museum for Kunst. Her work was included in the 2019 Hirschsprung exhibition devoted to J.L. Lund.
