= Hanne Hellesen =

Danish painter (1801–1844)

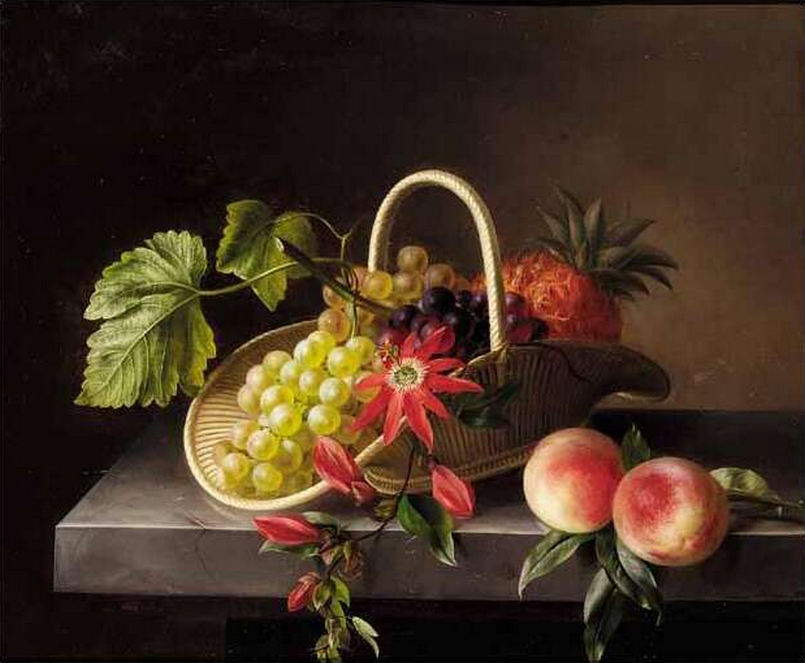
Still life of flowers and fruit, Hanne Hellesen 1836

Johanne (Hanne) Hellesen (1801–1844) was a Danish painter who was trained privately under Johan Laurentz Jensen as women had not yet been admitted to the Royal Danish Academy. She is recognized as one of the most successful female flower painters of her times. Some of her works were purchased by the Danish Royal Collection of Paintings, two for Kronborg and two for Fredensborg Palace. Others are in the collection of Statens Museum for Kunst.

== Biography ==
Born in Copenhagen on 20 December 1801, Johanne Hansen was the daughter of Hans Jochum Hellesen, a sea captain, and his wife Johanne Cecilie Margrethe née Gørtz. She was a private pupil of Johan Laurentz Jensen who specialized in flower painting. On the recommendation of the Royal Academy, from 1828 she received instruction in perspective from the painter Christoffer Wilhelm Eckersberg.

Hellesen exhibited at the Charlottenborg Spring Exhibition from 1825 to 1844, presenting no less than 67 works. Several of her paintings were purchased by members of the royal family, including Princess Vilhelmine and Princess Caroline. Many more were purchased by the Royal Collection. Some of her subjects were inspired by the flower decorations on porcelain from the Sèvres factory, mostly those from the beginning of the 19th century but some even earlier. Some of her works were included posthumously in the 1895 Kvindernes Udstilling (Women's Exhibition) where it was noted that she deserved a special place among Denmark's female artists. Today, several of Hellesen's works form part of the collection at Denmark's Statens Museum for Kunst.

Hanne Hellesen died in Copenhagen on 9 May 1844, aged only 43.
