= Henriette Hahn-Brinckmann =

Danish-German painter and lithographer

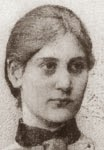
Henriette Hahn-Brinckmann

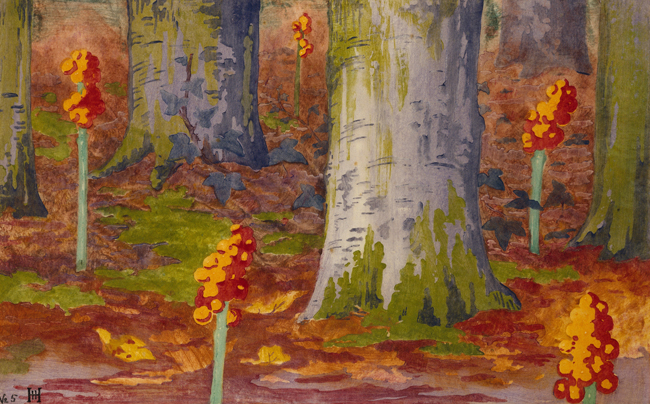
Henriette Hahn-Brinckmann: Dansk Ingefær (Danish Ginger) in the Japanese woodcut style (1933)

Henriette Christine Hahn-Brinckmann (1862–1934) was a Danish-German painter and lithographer. Among her most interesting works are those created with Japanese woodcutting tools which her husband, the museum curator Justus Brinckmann, brought to Hamburg.

== Biography ==
Born on 12 September 1862 in Copenhagen, Henriette Christine Hahn was the daughter of Heinrich Carl Hahn, a sea captain, and Caroline Vilhelmine Nielsen. She studied art at Zartmann's School, continuing her studies in Dresden and later at a private school in Paris (1892–94). In 1887, she began working as an art teacher at a girls school in Hamburg, headed by the German museum director and art historian Justus Brinkmann. They married in 1901.

Hahn-Brinckmann's work consisted mainly of portraits in the Realistic style she had learnt during her studies. From 1894, she created a considerable number of Art Nouveau woodcuts. She also worked on textile design and painted miniatures on ivory. She was not active as an artist while she was married but following her husband's death in 1914, she resumed her work.

Among her most notable works are her Japanese-inspired woodcut prints with up to six colours which she painted in the late 1890s. Hahn-Brinckmann created them using woodcut tools from Japan, specially imported by Justus Brinkmann. The works were widely exhibited, in Hamburg, Dresden, Copenhagen and at the 1900 Paris World Exhibition, where she was awarded a silver medal. Four examples of her Japanese-style woodcuts can be seen at the Vejen Art Museum in the south of Jutland.

Henriette Hahn-Brinckmann died in Hamburg-Bergedorf on 2 April 1934.
