= Johan Laurentz Jensen =

Danish painter (1800–1856)

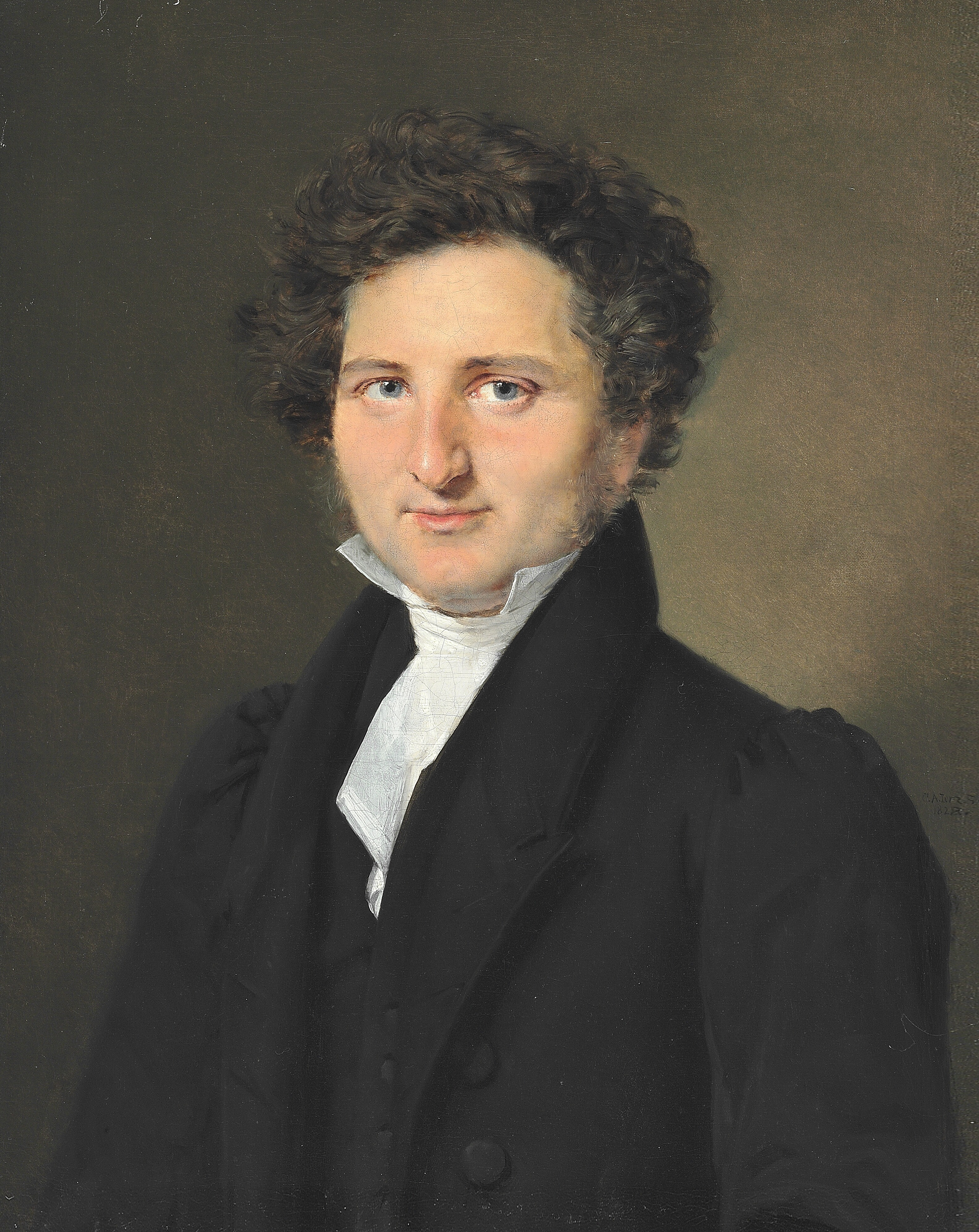
- J. L. Jensen painted by Christian Albrecht Jensen in 1828
- Born: 8 March 1800; Gentofte, Denmark
- Died: 26 March 1856 (aged 56); Copenhagen, Denmark
- Education: Royal Danish Academy of Fine Arts
- Known for: Flower painting

Johan Laurentz Jensen, often referred to as J. L. Jensen (8 March 1800 – 26 March 1856), was a Danish artist who specialized in flower painting.

== Early life and education ==
In parallel with his studies at the Danish Academy, he became a pupil of Christoffer Wilhelm Eckersberg and also of Cladius Detlev Fritzsch. Specializing in flower painting, Jensen continued his education in Paris under the Flemish flower painting brothers, Gérard and Cornelis van Spaendonck, and at the porcelain factory in Sèvres where he learnt the art of miniature flower painting.

== Career ==
Taking 17th-century Dutch flower painting as a starting point, he revived the art in Denmark. His floral arrangements often had both a decorative and symbolic value. Danish plants were often accompanied by exotic flowers and fruits, sometimes even birds. He also became head artist at the Danish Porcelain Factory. Jensen had an extensive circle of customers and many students, especially women, including Louise of Hesse-Kassel who later married King Christian IX. Since the 1980s, his works have gained wide international recognition. Many are exhibited in Statens Museum for Kunst and in Thorvaldsens Museum.

== Style ==
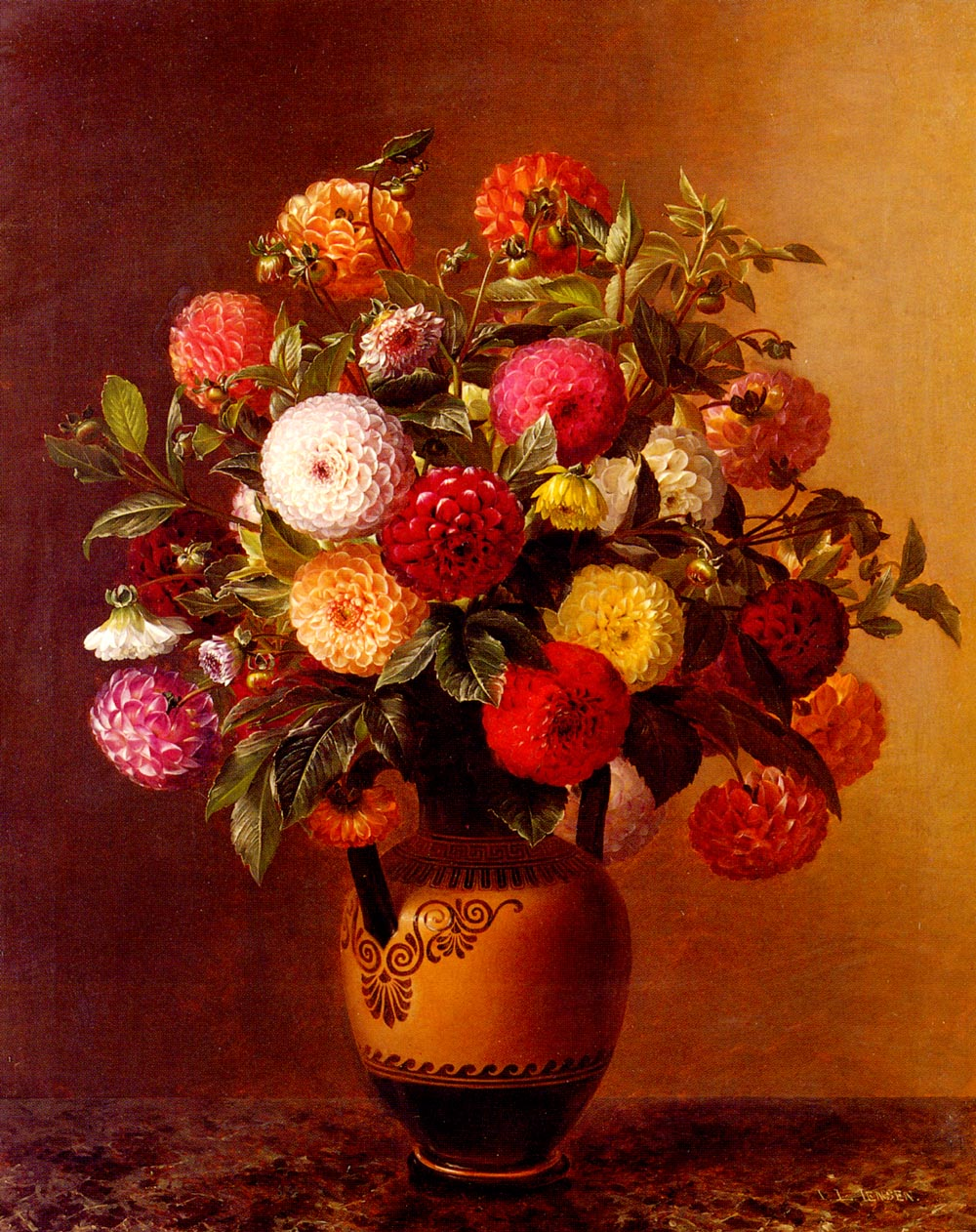
Vase of Dahlias

Jensen's flowers were typically arranged as a bouquet standing in a vase, usually on a tray. A dark neutral background helped to emphasize the light colourful tones of the flowers. Roses were often the principal subject, sometimes set off with another flower such as a lilly or with several flowers of different varieties. Jensen mastered the art of reproducing nature. His appreciation of earlier masterpieces can be seen in his own work. His paintings characteristically are rich in colour and variety. Some of them depict flowers lying on a table or in a basket, perhaps strung together in a wreath. While he was one of several artists who painted exotic plants from Rosenborg, he was happiest when he was painting out in the country at Gentofte, sometimes painting wild flowers or strawberries. Some of his works from the 1840s contain exotic fruits or even birds.

== Personal life ==
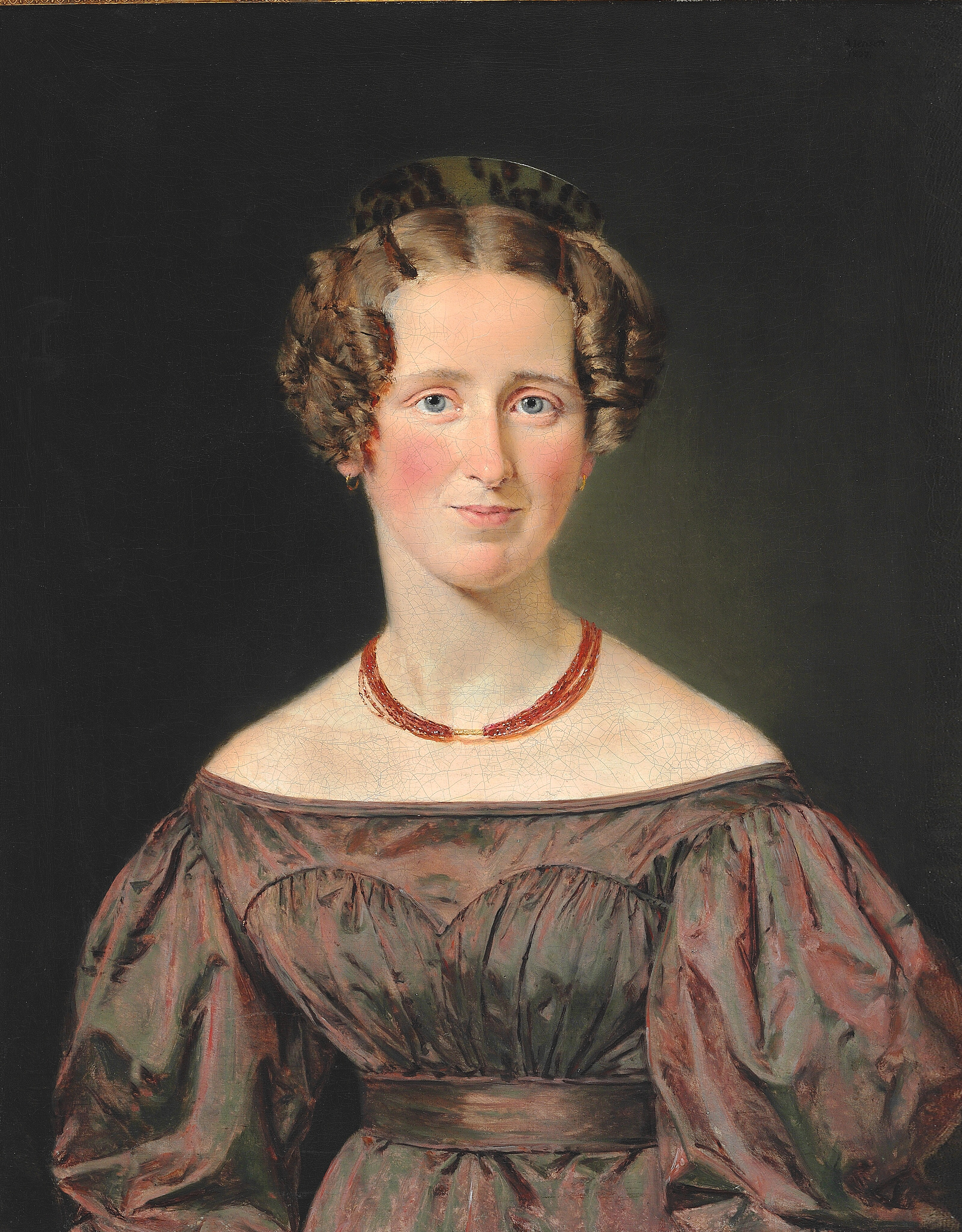
Signe Marie Vilhelmine Jensen, née Visby

Larsen married Signe Marie Vilhelmine Visby (1804-1884). In 1840 they resided in a first-floor apartment at Købmagergade 55.

== Selected works ==
The following works are held in the collection of Statens Museum for Kunst:

- En ananas og andre frugter (1832)
- En kurv med frugter på en træstub (1844)
- En kårde med laurbærkrans (1848)
- En vase med blomster (1834)
- Forskellige frugter, blandt andet melon og vindruer (1852)
- Kamelier og rhododendron (1852)
- Skudt vildt (1846)
