= Tegne- og Kunstindustriskolen for Kvinder =

Danish art school for women

Arts and Crafts School for Women
- Tegneskolen for Kvinder
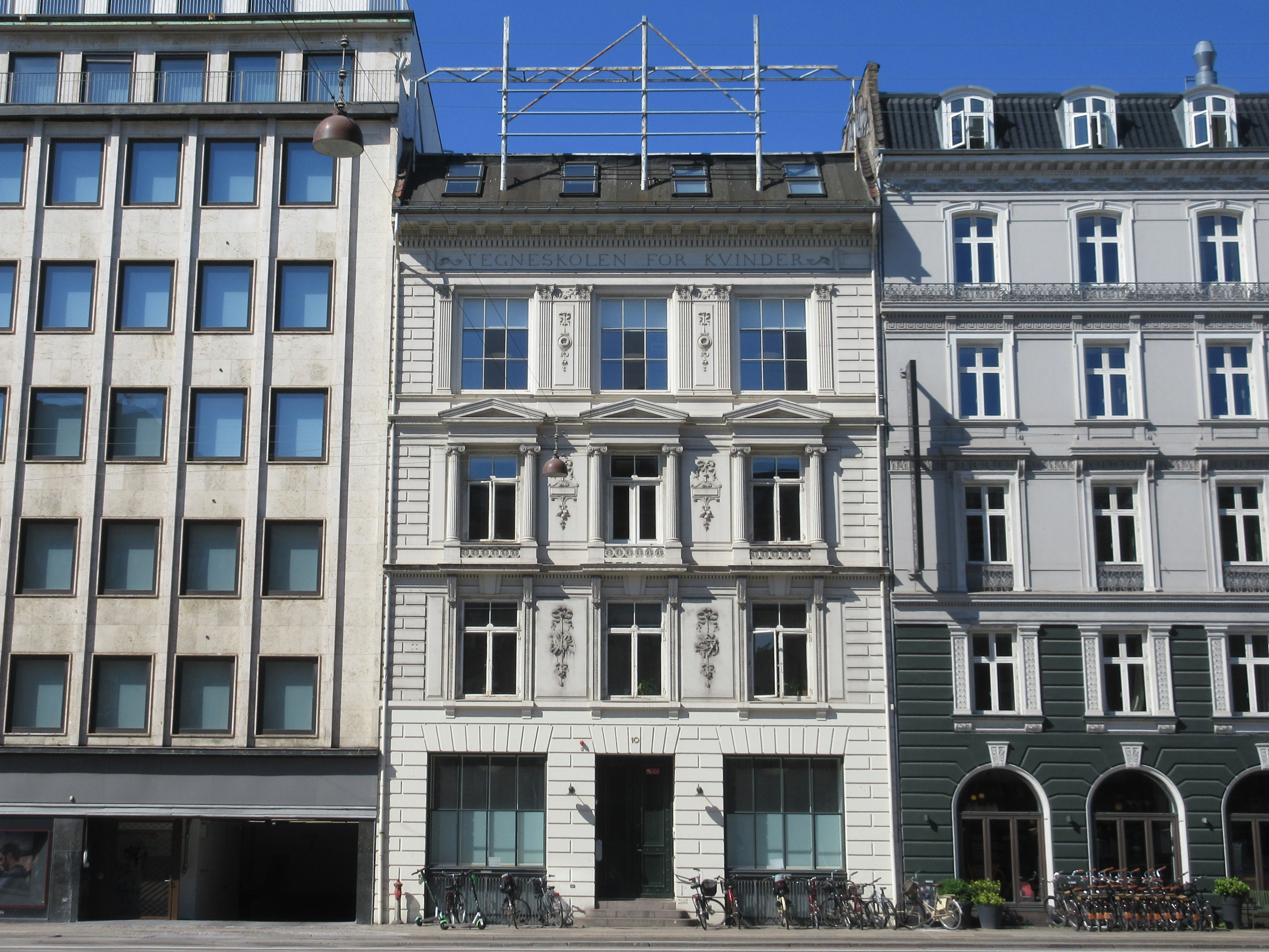
- The building in June 2020
- Interactive map of the Arts and Crafts School for Women area

General information
- Architectural style: Historicism
- Location: Copenhagen, Denmark
- Coordinates: 55°40′36.9″N 12°35′58.29″E
- Completed: 1881
- Owner: Danish Women's Society

Design and construction
- Architect: Vilhelm Klein

Tegne- og Kunstindustriskolen for Kvinder (literally Draftsmanship and Industrial Design School for Women but sometimes referred to as the Arts and Crafts School for Women) was a private Danish educational establishment in Copenhagen. From 1875, it aimed to provide better facilities for women to develop competence in visual arts and handicrafts at a time when they were unable to enter the Royal Danish Academy of Fine Arts. The school continued to operate until 1967 when it was merged with the Kunsthåndværkerskolen to form Skole for Brugskunst, later known as Danmarks Designskole.

The school was from 1881 based at H. C. Andersens Boulevard 10. The building was designed in the Historicist style by Vilhelm Klein. It was listed on the Danish registry of protected buildings and places in 1993. The building is now operated as a women's refuge by the Danish Women's Society.

== History ==
Discussion of the possibility of allowing women to study at the Royal Danish Academy began in the early 1870s following enquiries from the Danish Women's Society. At the time, as women began to play an increasingly active role, it was realized that if they were to be professionally employed, there was a need for them to be trained in appropriate institutions. A proposal from Ferdinand Meldahl in 1873 to open the Academy to women, received a measure of support but it was not sufficient to provide for a women's department within the Academy.

In 1875, the school was founded by the Danish Women's Society in rented premises in the Industrial Association Building. The objective was to "provide women with training in drawing and other skills and abilities that might prove useful to them when seeking employment in the service of industry". The school opened on 4 January 1876 with just six students.

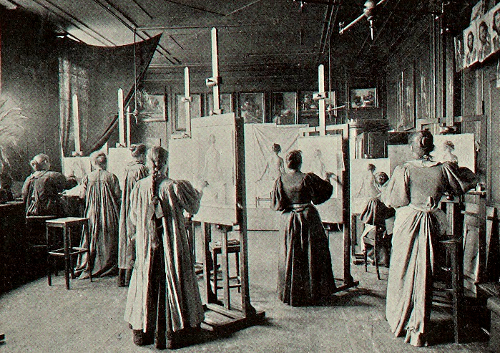
A model class in the new school building, 1881

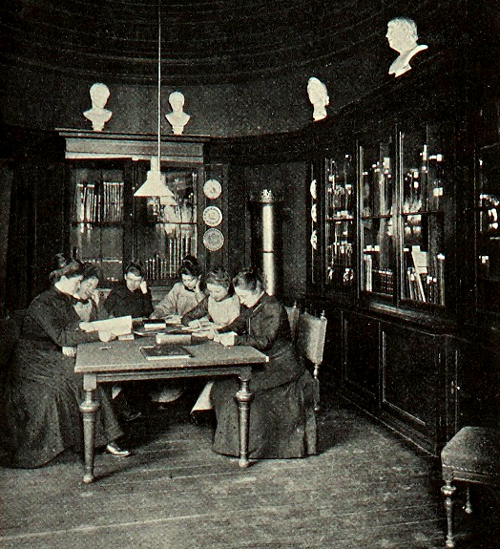
The library, 1881

Charlotte Klein, a member of the Women's Society, was a key figure in the school's creation and success. She became the school's first principal and a motivated teacher, initially working without a salary. Her husband, Vilhelm Klein, an architect who had founded the Craft School (Håndværkerskolen) in 1968, became chairman of the board. In 1877, the school became an independent institution with state and municipal support. The Women's Society continued nevertheless to have a representative on the Board. Vilhelm and Charlotte Klein managed the school until 1907.

Vilhelm Klein was also charged with the design of a new school building in a prominent location on the city's new West Boulevard (now H. C. Andersens Boulevard). Construction began in 1880 and the building was inaugurated on 14 September 1881. Approximately 200 people attended the ceremony. "That women have the same talents as men, no one can deny" was the basis on which the architect Vilhem Klein designed the Tegneskole.

From 1888, when an Art School for Women was opened at the Academy, students were admitted without further examinations if Tegneskolen provided a recommendation.

Students from the school were acclaimed at exhibitions at home and abroad. At the 1989 Paris Exposition, the school was awarded a technical school medal. Those who studied at the school were employed by porcelain firms such as Bing & Grøndahl or in the areas of textiles, gold embroidery and weaving.

In 1961, when men were admitted to the school, the name became Tegne- og Kunstindustriskolen. After merging with the School of Decorative Art (Skolen for Brugskunst) in 1973, and a further merger with the School of Interior Design (Skolen for Boligindretning) in 1989 it became Danmarks Designskole.

== Architecture ==
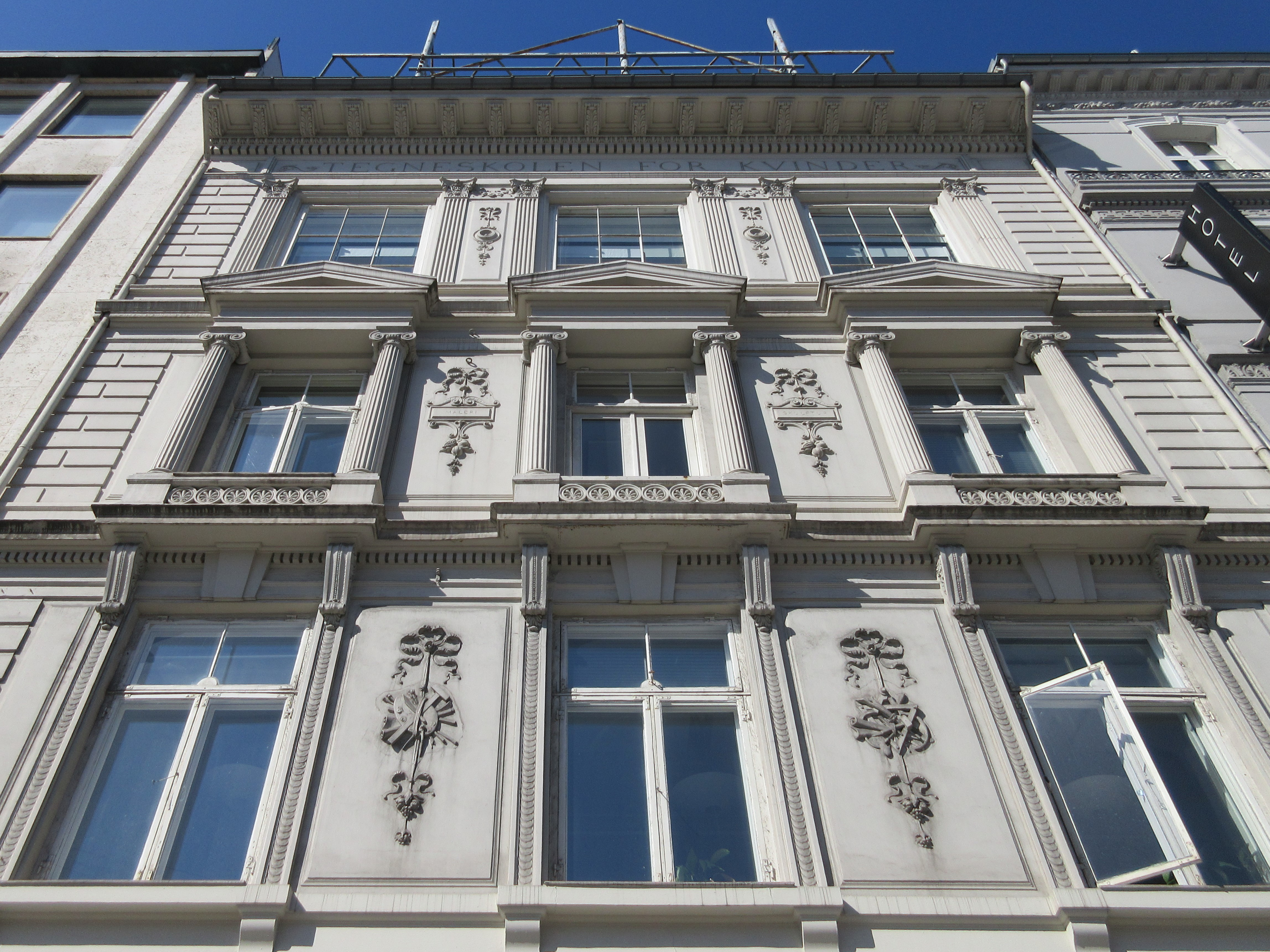
Facade detail

The building is designed in the Historicist style that dominated Danish architecture in the late 19th century. The windows on the three upper floors are flanked by Ionic pilasters and the windows on the third floor are tipped by triangular pediments. Relief ornamentation are seen between the windows on all three floors. The relief ornamentation on the third floor frames the words "maleri" ("painting" and "skulptir" ("sculpture"). The facade is finished by a heavy cornice supported by corbels. The first name of the school, name "Tegneskolen for Kvinder", is written in relief lettering on a band below the cornice.

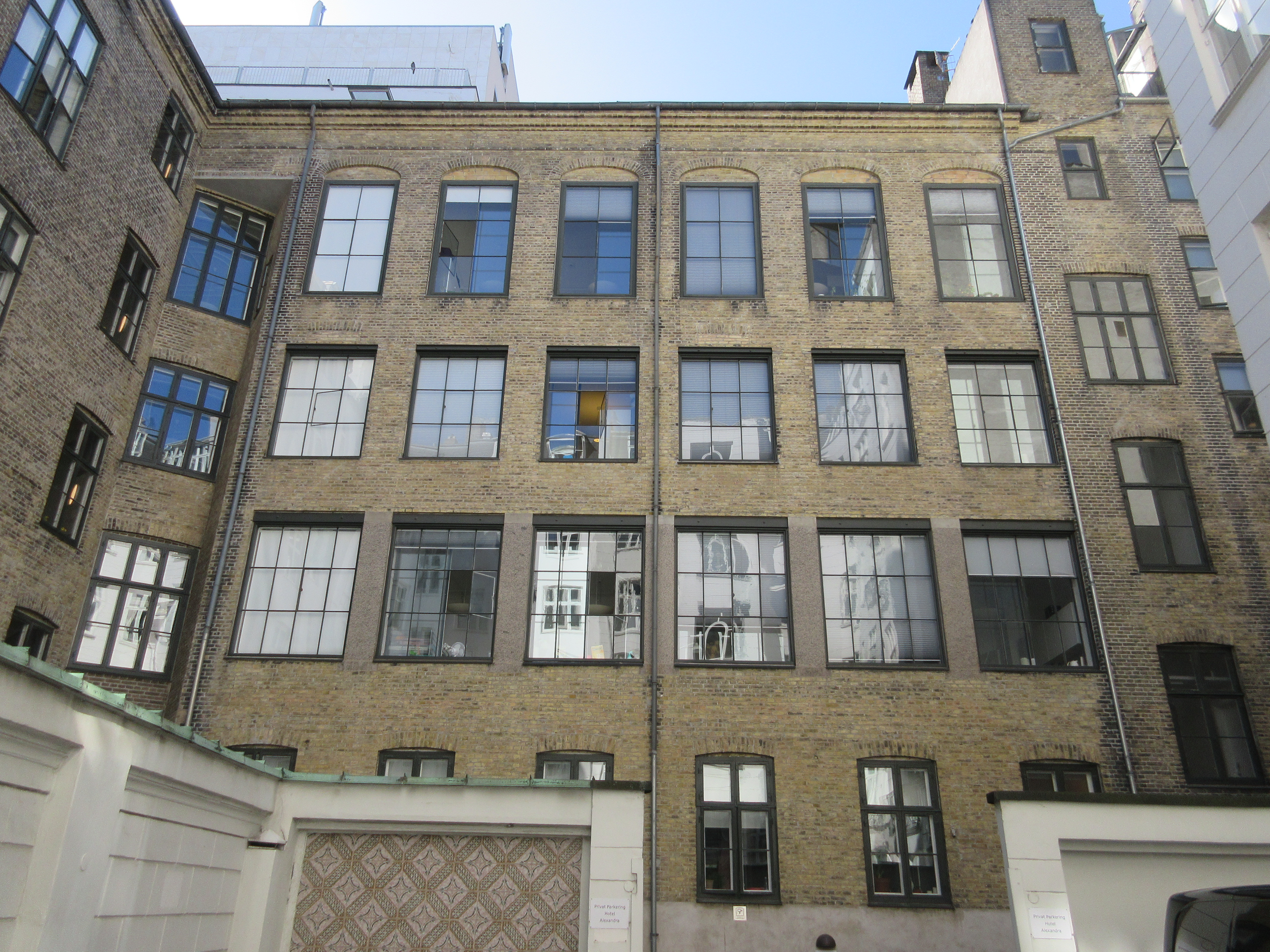
The side wing seen from the yard of neighbouring Hotel Alexandra

A side wing extends from the rear side of the building. The two buildings are joined by a canted corner bay. The side wing forms the southern margin of a small courtyard shared with neighbouring Hotel Alexandra. The facade towards the yard stands in undressed brick and is dominated by large studio windows.

The building was listed on the Danish registry of protected buildings and places in 1993.

== The building today ==
The building is now operated as a women's refuge by the Danish Women's Society. It was adapted for its current use by Over Byen Arkitekter in 2018. It contains 20 dwellings.

== People associated with the school ==
- Gudrun Stig Aagaard (1895–1986), student
- Astrid Aagesen (1883–1965), student
- Nanna Aakjær (1874–1962), student
- Franciska Clausen (1899–1986), teacher
- Bertha Dorph (1875–1960), Academy committee
- Margrete Drejer (1889–1975), student
- Kirstine Frederiksen (1845–1903), board member
- Margrethe Hald (1897–1982), student
- Inger Hanmann (1918–2007), student
- Kristín Jónsdóttir (1888–1959), student
- Hanne Kjærholm (1930–2009), student
- Eva Koppel (1916–2006), student
- Clara Lachmann (1864–1920), student
- Elinborg Lützen (1919–1995), student
- Ernestine Nyrop (1888–1975), student
- Dagmar Olrik (1860–1932), student
- Marie Sandholt (1872–1942), student
- Ellen Trotzig (1878–1949), student
- Bertha Wegmann (1847–1926), board member
- Ida Winckler (1907–1995), student

== Gallery ==
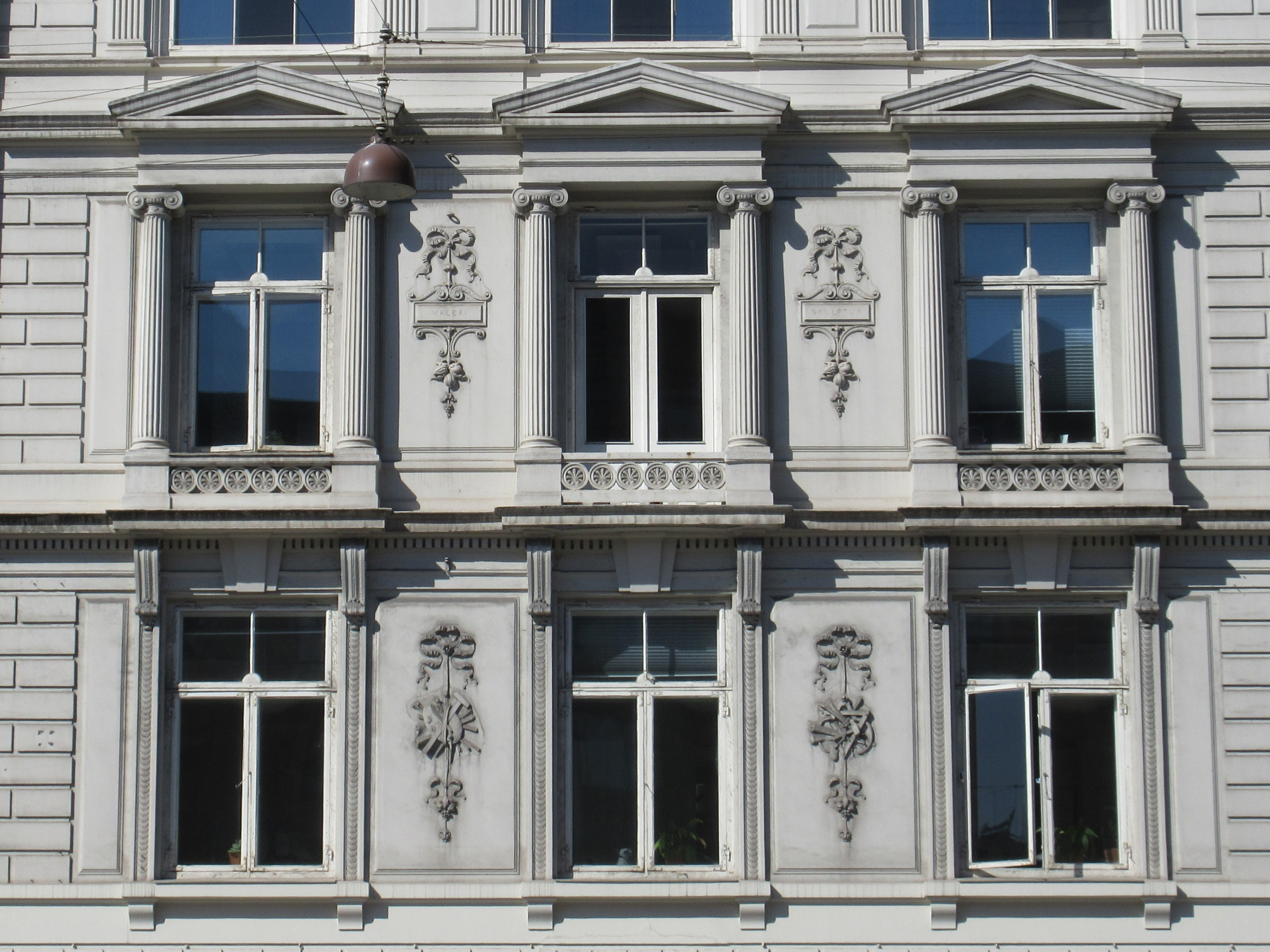
Windows on the second and third floor

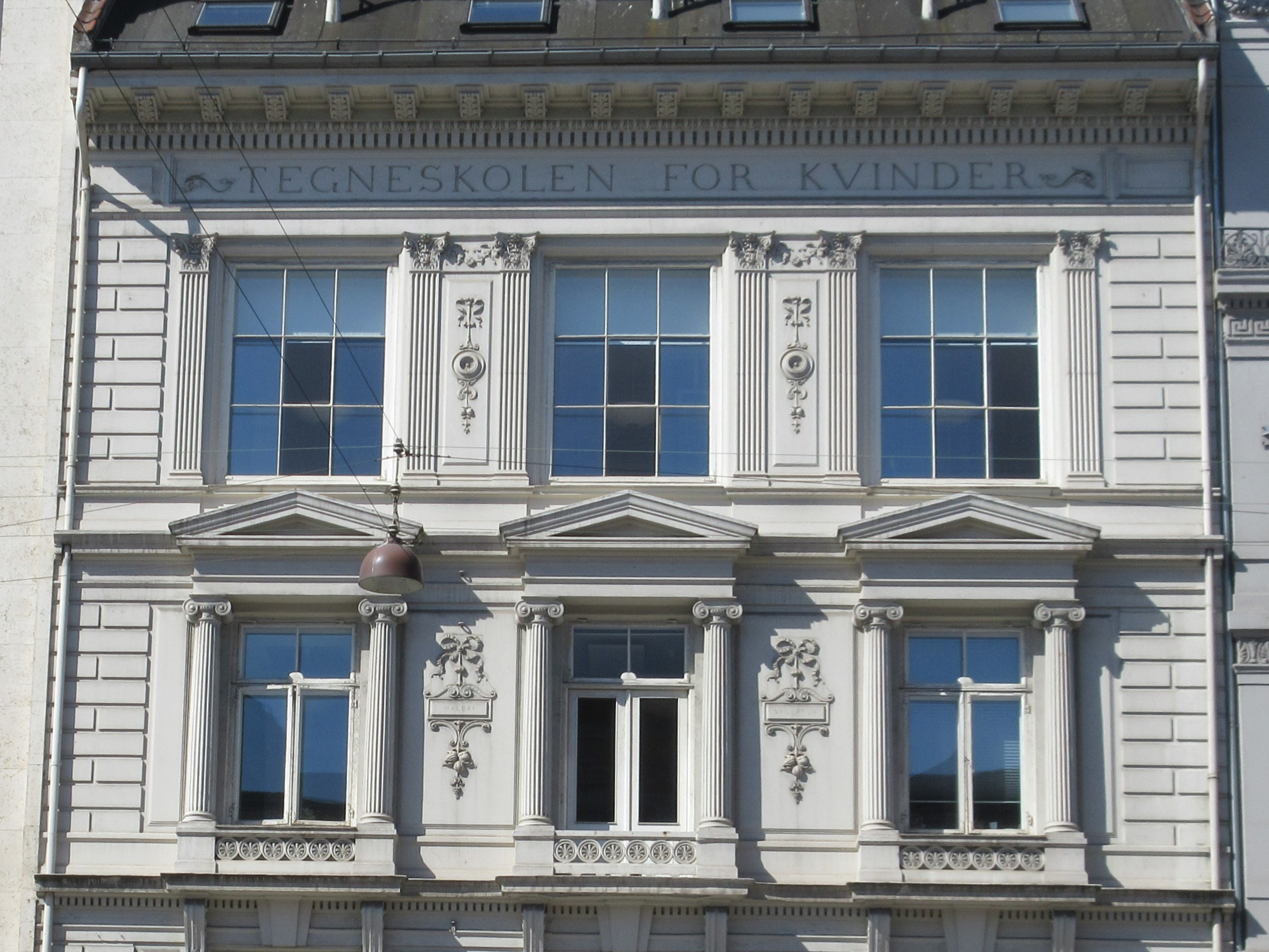
The two upper floors

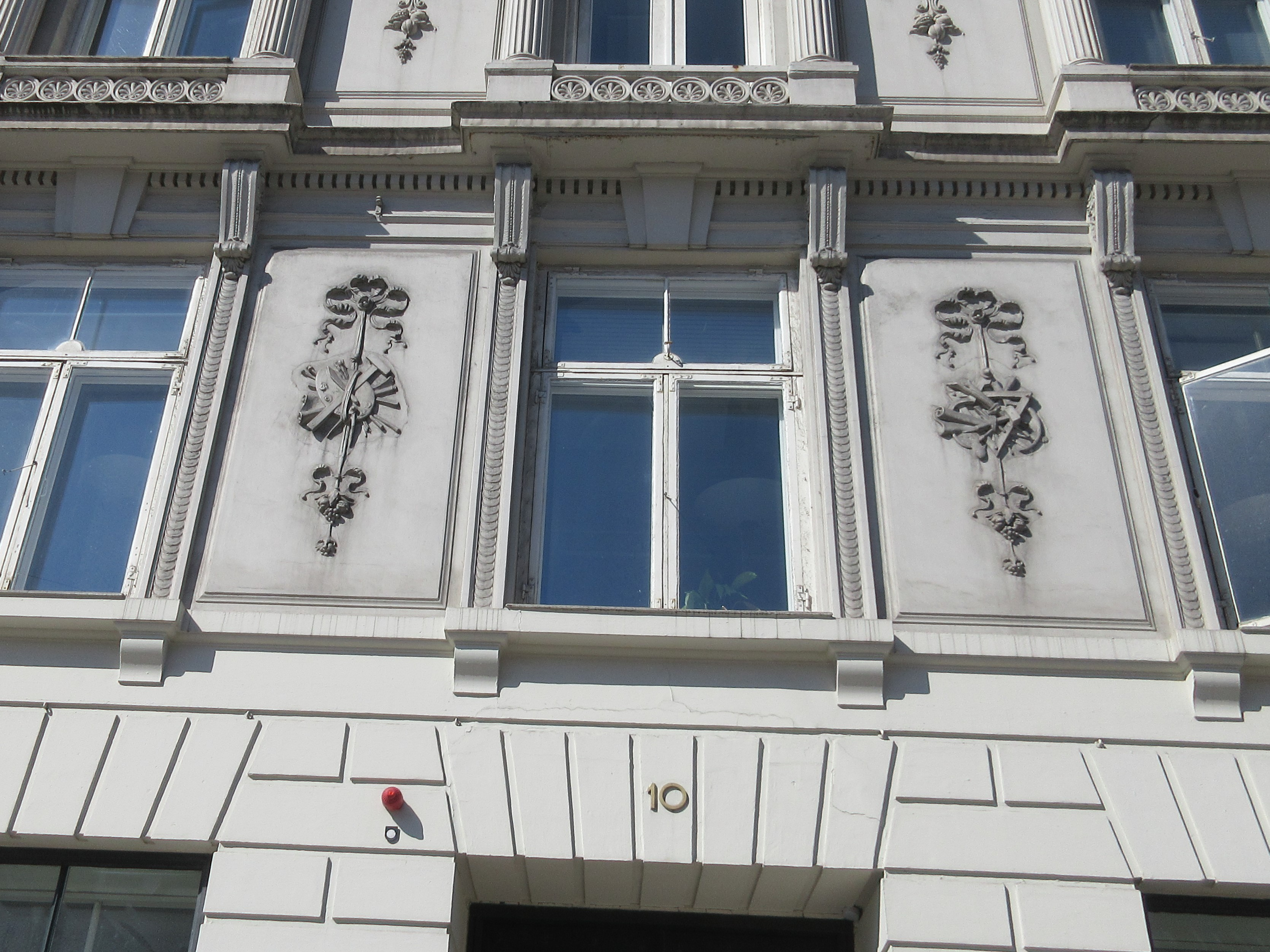
Central window on the first floor

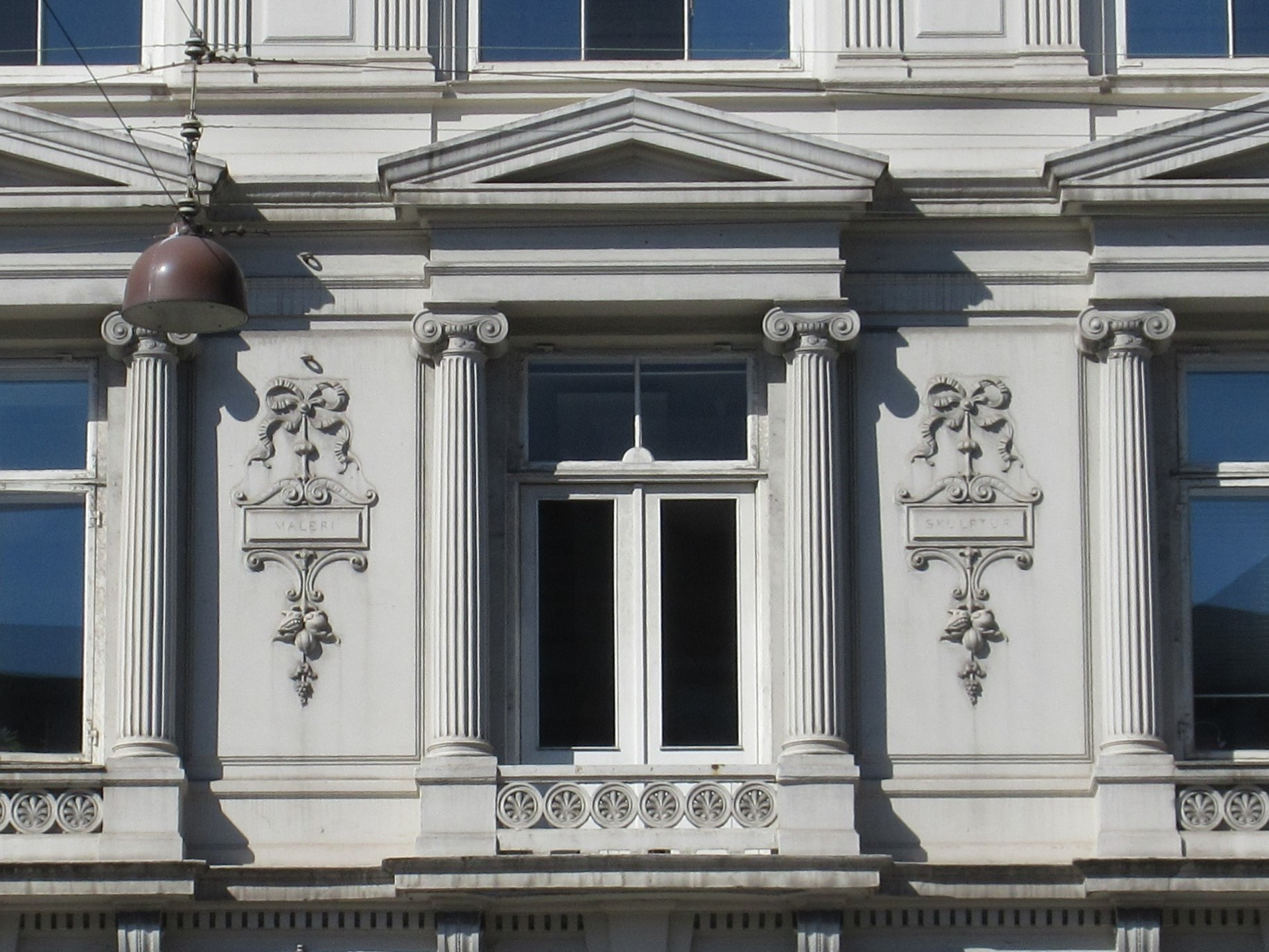
Central window on the second floor

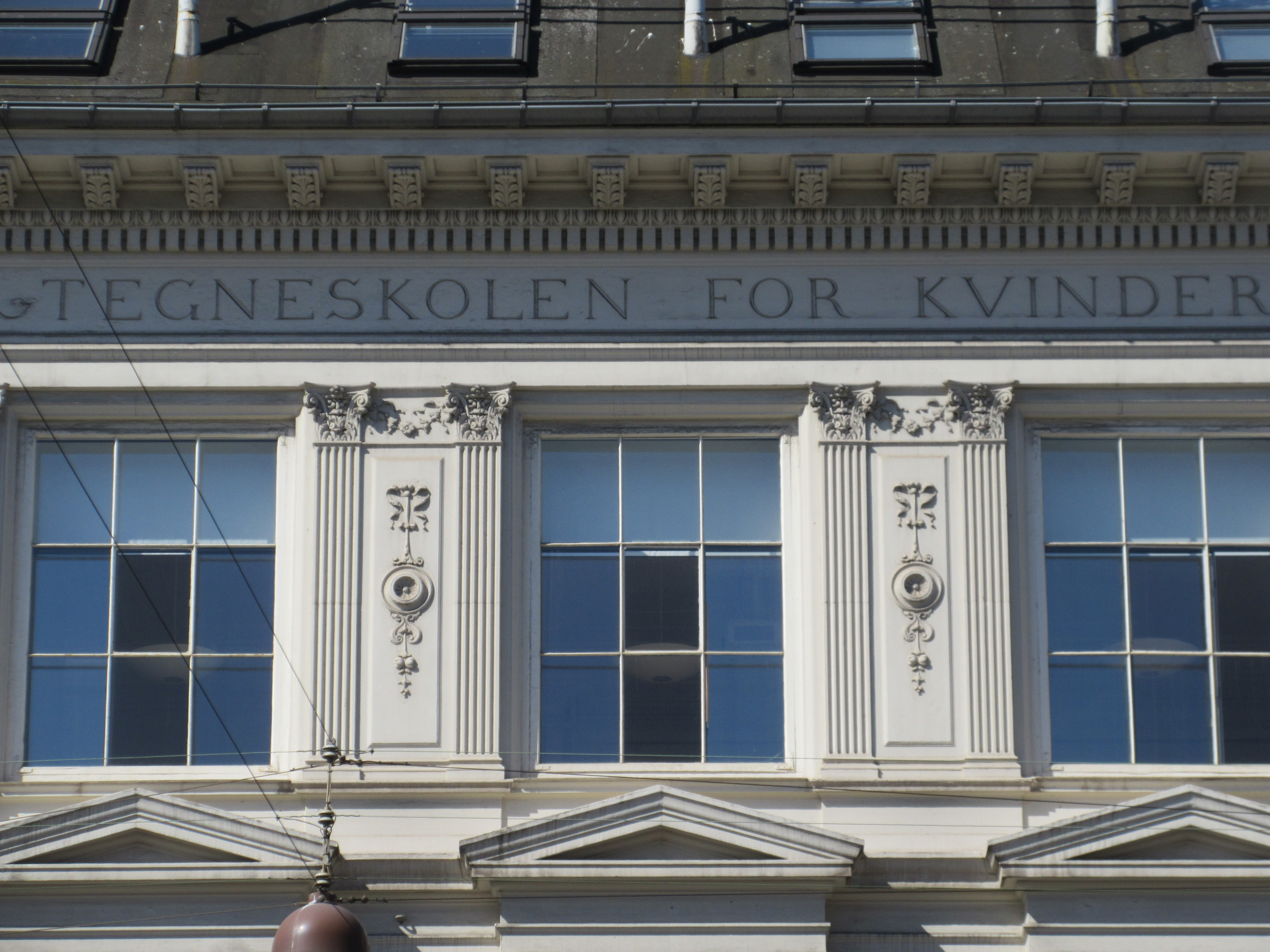
The cornice

== See also ==
- Kvindelig Læseforening
- Kunstnernes Frie Studieskoler
- Holckenhus
- Kunstnerhjemmet
