= Marie Sandholt =

Danish painter and ceramist

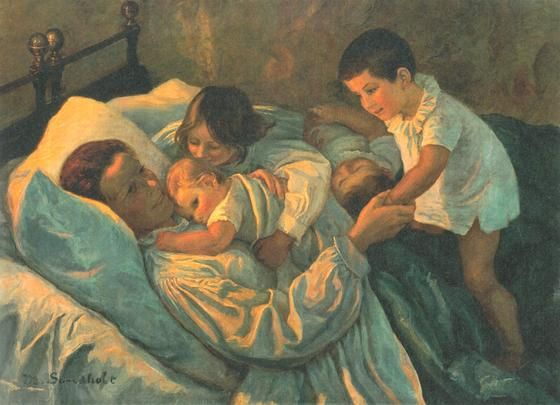
Marie Sandholt: Morgenglæde (1902)

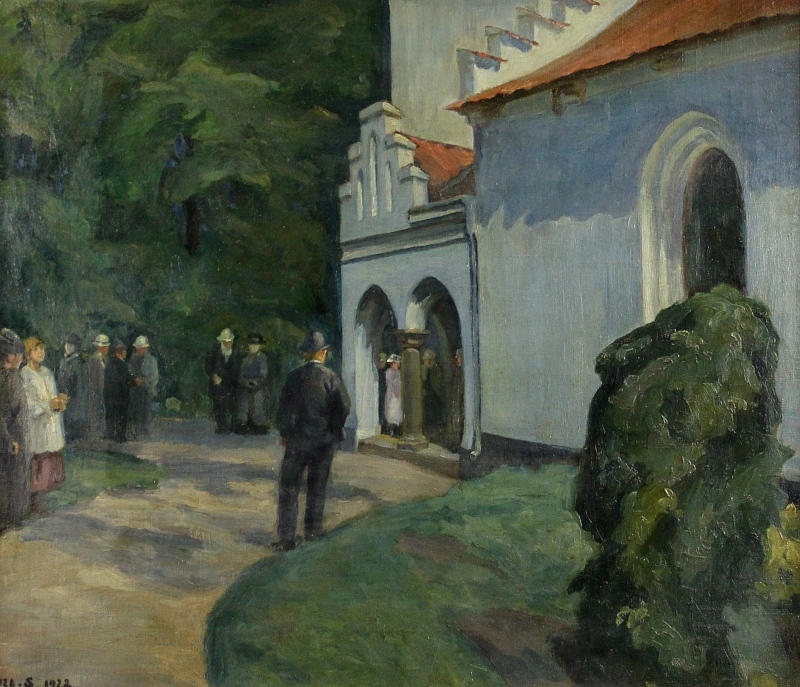
Marie Sandholt: Figures in the churchyard (1922)

Anna Marie Louise Sandholt (1872–1942) was a Danish painter and ceramist who practised outdoor painting at a time when it was unusual for women to do so. Before studying painting, she had been active as an embroidery teacher. As a ceramist, she created porcelain figures for Bing & Grøndahl. Many of her landscapes depicted trees, with which she developed a special relationship after the First World War.

== Biography ==
Born on 22 March 1872 in Copenhagen, Anna Marie Louise Sandholt was the daughter of the physician Peter Boll Wivet Sandholt (1827–90) and Louise Victoria Aagaard (1848–1920). After being brought up by a well-to-do family, she began to study art at the Tegne- og Kunstindustriskolen for Kvinder (Arts and Crafts School for Women). From 1892 to 1901, she continued her studies at the Kunstakademiets Kunstskole for Kvinder (Academy's Art School for Women). In 1902 she finished "Joy of Motherhood" which embodies the idea of fertility and the naturalness of having children.

Her real introduction to painting, however, occurred later when she was working as a maid in the home of the painter Viggo Pedersen (1854–1926) in Skamstrup near Holbæk. This contributed significantly to her artistic education.

At a time when women artists were more active in textiles than in painting, Sandholt stood out as an oil painter who took her work extremely seriously. In 1905, she returned to the Arts and Crafts School for Women, this time as an embroidery teacher. In addition to embroidered works, she designed porcelain figures for Bing & Grøndahl. On one of her study trips to Italy, she met the Norwegian painter Christian Krohg who helped her develop her technique and composition.

One of her most notable early works is Morgenglæde (Morning Joy, 1902) depicting a mother with her four children in a double bed, inspired by Johansen's pictures of family life. She went on to paint naturalistic, outdoor scenes in a freer, more nuanced style. Her landscapes, sometimes with figures, often depicted trees and forests. She had developed a special liking for them as so many had been destroyed in the north of France during the First World War. On occasion, she also painted portraits including one of the actor Johannes Poulsen in Twelfth Night. She exhibited at Kunsthal Charlottenborg from 1895 to 1943 but also arranged a number of solo shows throughout the country.
