= Vilhelm Pedersen =

Danish painter and illustrator (1820–1859)

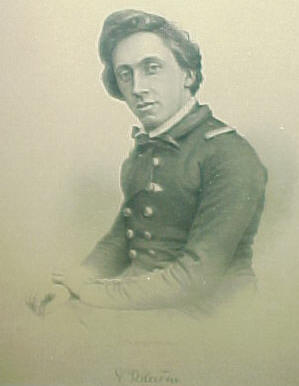
Vilhelm Pedersen

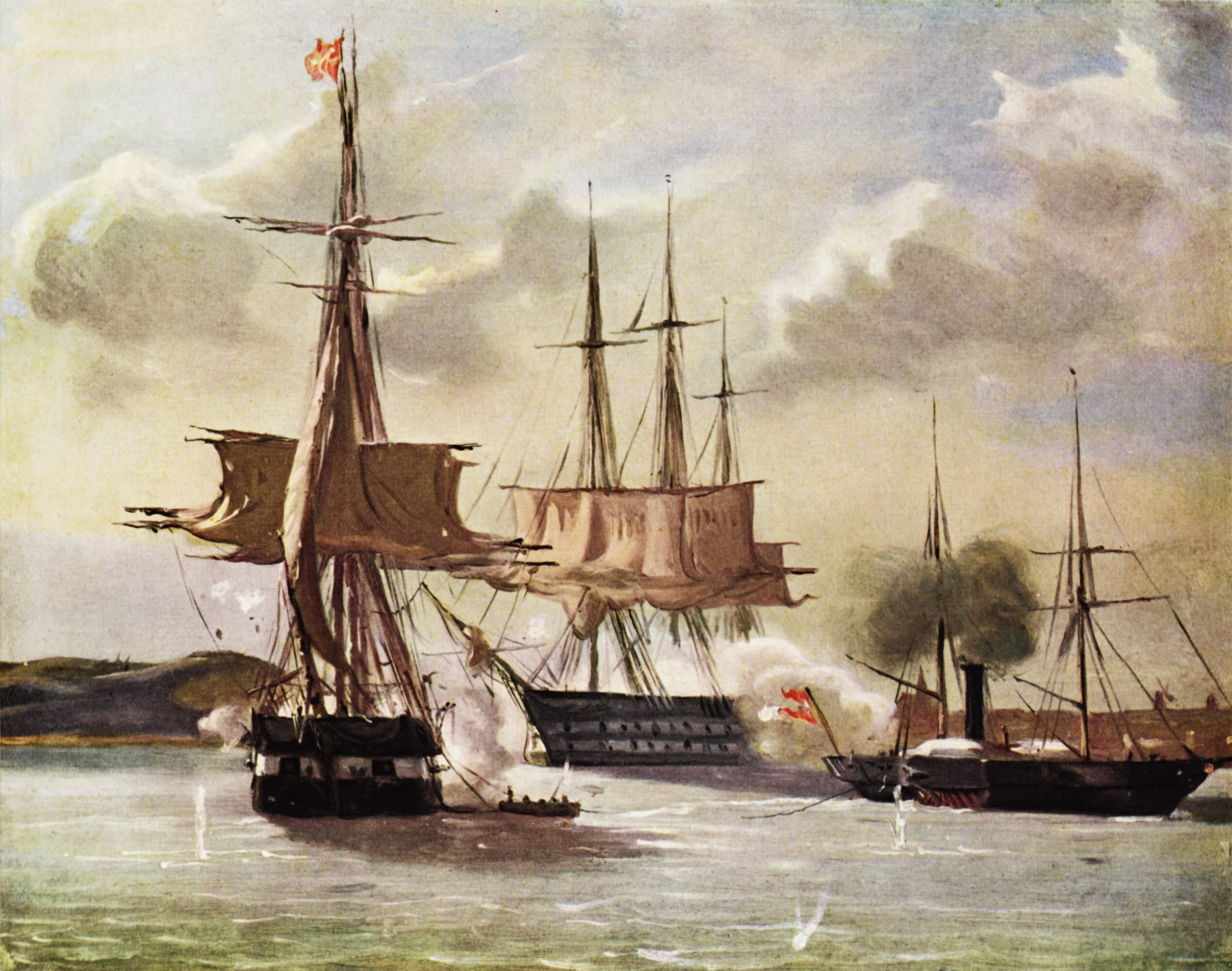
Scene from the Battle of Eckernförde

Thomas Vilhelm Pedersen (28 January 1820 – 13 March 1859) was a Danish painter and illustrator who is known for his illustrations for fairy tales of Hans Christian Andersen. He was the first artist to illustrate Andersen's works. His drawings were converted into wood prints and used in the Danish and German editions.

== Biography ==
Pedersen was born in Karlslunde, south-west of Copenhagen. He initially followed in his father's footsteps and became an officer in the Royal Danish Navy. He was interested in drawing and in 1843 Christian VIII granted him four years' paid leave to enable him to pursue an artistic career. He studied with Wilhelm Marstrand and enrolled at the Royal Danish Academy of Fine Arts. He first exhibited his works in 1847, but voluntarily returned to the army at the outbreak of the Three Year War. He participated in the Battle of Eckernförde, which he would later depict in two paintings. He then continued his interrupted naval career until his early death in 1859.

== Private life ==
His sons Thorolf Pedersen (1858–1942) and Viggo Pedersen (1854–1926) were also painters.
