= Vrigsted =

Village in Denmark

Coordinates: 55°44′N 9°50′E

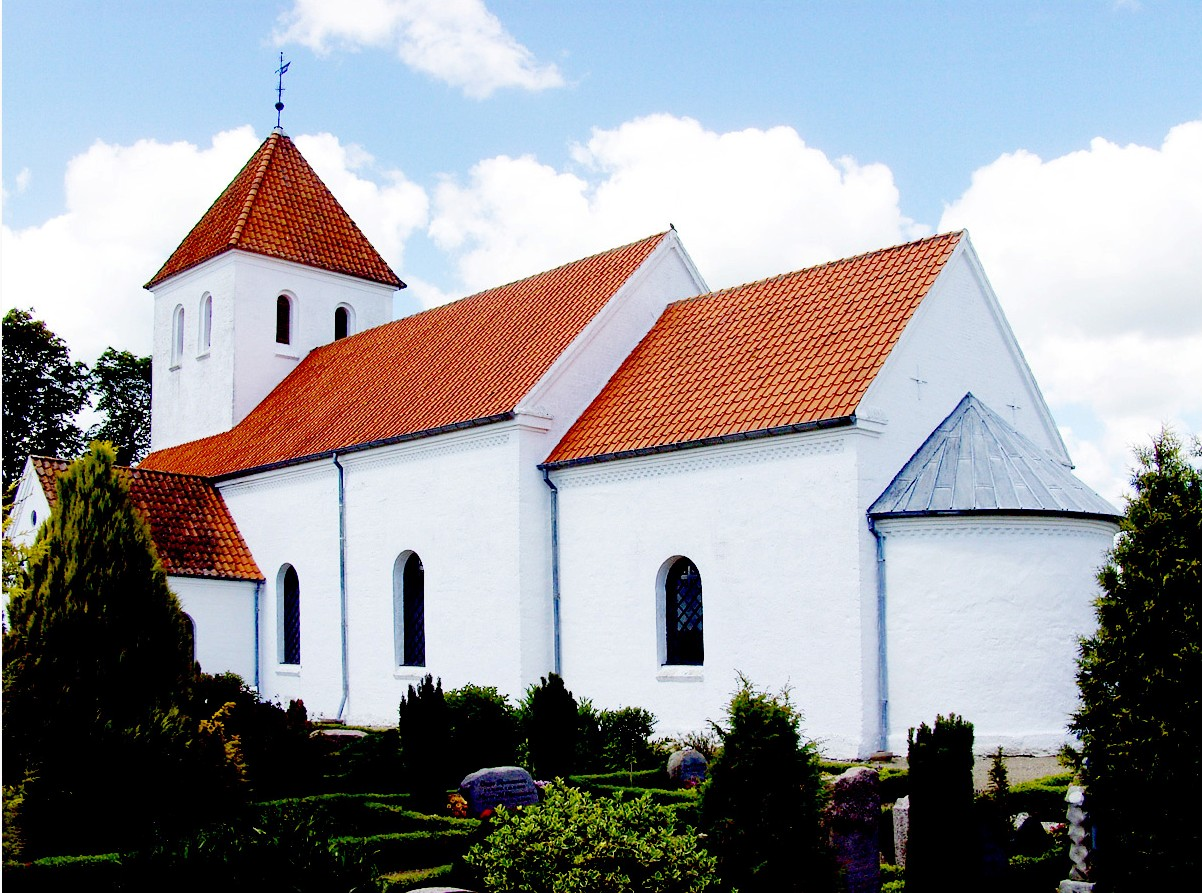
Vrigsted Church

Vrigsted is a parish and a village in the Danish Municipality of Hedensted in eastern Jutland. As of 2015, the parish has a population of 327.

Vrigsted Church, built in the first half of the 12th century, has undergone alterations and additions over the centuries. Restored in 2000, it still bears traces of its Romanesque origins. Remains of its wall frescos can also be seen.

== Notable people ==
- Margrethe Hald (1897 in Neder Vrigsted – 1982) a Danish textile historian and curator at the National Museum of Denmark
