= Kirstine Frederiksen =

Danish pedagogue and women's activist

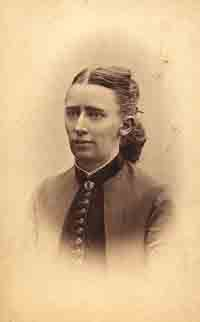
Kirstine Frederiksen

Elisabeth Kirstine Frederiksen (1845–1903) was a Danish pedagogue, writer and women's activist. Influenced by study trips to the United States, she was a pioneer of visual pedagogy in Denmark, publishing Anskuelsesundervisning, Haandbog for Lærere (Visual Instruction: a Handbook for Teachers) in 1889. She was also an active contributor to the women's movement, chairing the Women Readers' Association from 1875 to 1879, and the Danish Women's Society from 1887 to 1894.

== Biography ==
Born on 6 February 1845 in Fuglsang Manor on the Danish island of Lolland, Frederiksen was the eldest daughter of estate owner and farmer Johannes Ditlev Friderichsen (1791–1861) and Maria Hansen (1811–1901), and was the younger sister of Niels Christian Frederiksen and Erhard Frederiksen. In 1870 she travelled to London, and in 1872 to Italy and Switzerland, before settling in Copenhagen, where she became active in supporting women's rights, especially by heading the Women Readers' Association. When she was 33, she began to study stenography, becoming the first woman in Denmark to pass the qualifying examination in 1878. However, as a woman, she was refused a position as a stenographer at the Rigsdag.

In 1879, after qualifying as a teacher, she taught at Frederiksberg's state school from 1879 to 1895, and taught pedagogy at N. Zahle's School in Copenhagen from 1882 to 1844.

Although Frederiksen did not undertake university studies, in 1891 she received the University of Copenhagen's gold medal for her pedagogical dissertation, De vigtigste almene Love for Opdragelsen, som lader sig udlede af den nyere Psykologi og Etik, a work which was never published. She had, however, already begun publishing in the 1880s, contributing critical articles to journals such as Vor Ungdom, and writing books on teaching methods including Anskuelsesundervisning (1889), Barnets Sjæleliv (1890), and Amerikanske Undervisnings-Eksperimenter (1896). Following her study trips to the United States and Germany, she suggested that in their first school years, Danish children should be encouraged to learn on the basis of their senses of smell, taste, sight and feeling, rather than on reading books.

As a women's rights activist, Frederiksen chaired the Women Readers' Association from 1875 to 1879. In 1875, she presented a lecture on English women's voluntary contributions to society, and worked to make the association more suited to the needs of university students. She chaired the Danish Women's Society from 1887 to 1894, and was one of its most effective leaders, until she began to suffer from serious health problems. She was also a board member of the Women's Art College, Tegne- og Kunstindustriskolen for Kvinder.

In 1903, Frederiksen travelled to the United States with her friend Augusta Fenger. She died on 31 August 1903, while staying in the Allegheny Mountains.
