= Bertha Dorph =

Danish painter

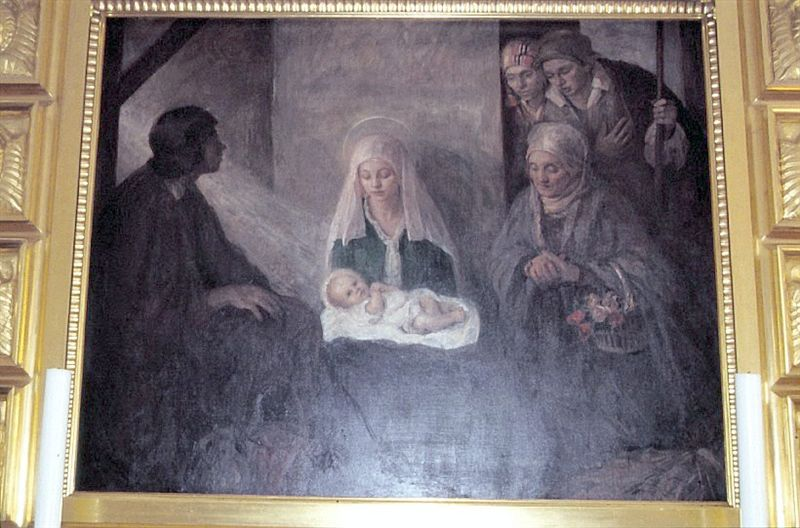
Bertha Dorph's altarpiece in Ollerup Church

Bertha Olga Vilhelmine Herlich Dorph née Green (4 June 1875 – 25 February 1960) was a Danish painter.

== Biography ==
Born in Copenhagen, Dorph was privately educated under Harald Slott-Møller and Peter Ilsted in Copenhagen (1893–97) after which she spent a year training in Berlin. She also studied etching at Berlin's Schinkel-akademie. She debuted at Den Frie Udstilling in 1899. In 1900, she married the painter Niels Vinding Dorph (1862–1931) who influenced her work. Her painting of a young woman awaiting childbirth (Et besøg hos den unge barselskone) is considered a masterpiece among her early works of family and children. Later she painted studies of flowers, landscapes and many portraits, especially of children. In 1925, she created another major work Julenat (Christmas Night) now in Ollerup Church near Svendborg, Funen.

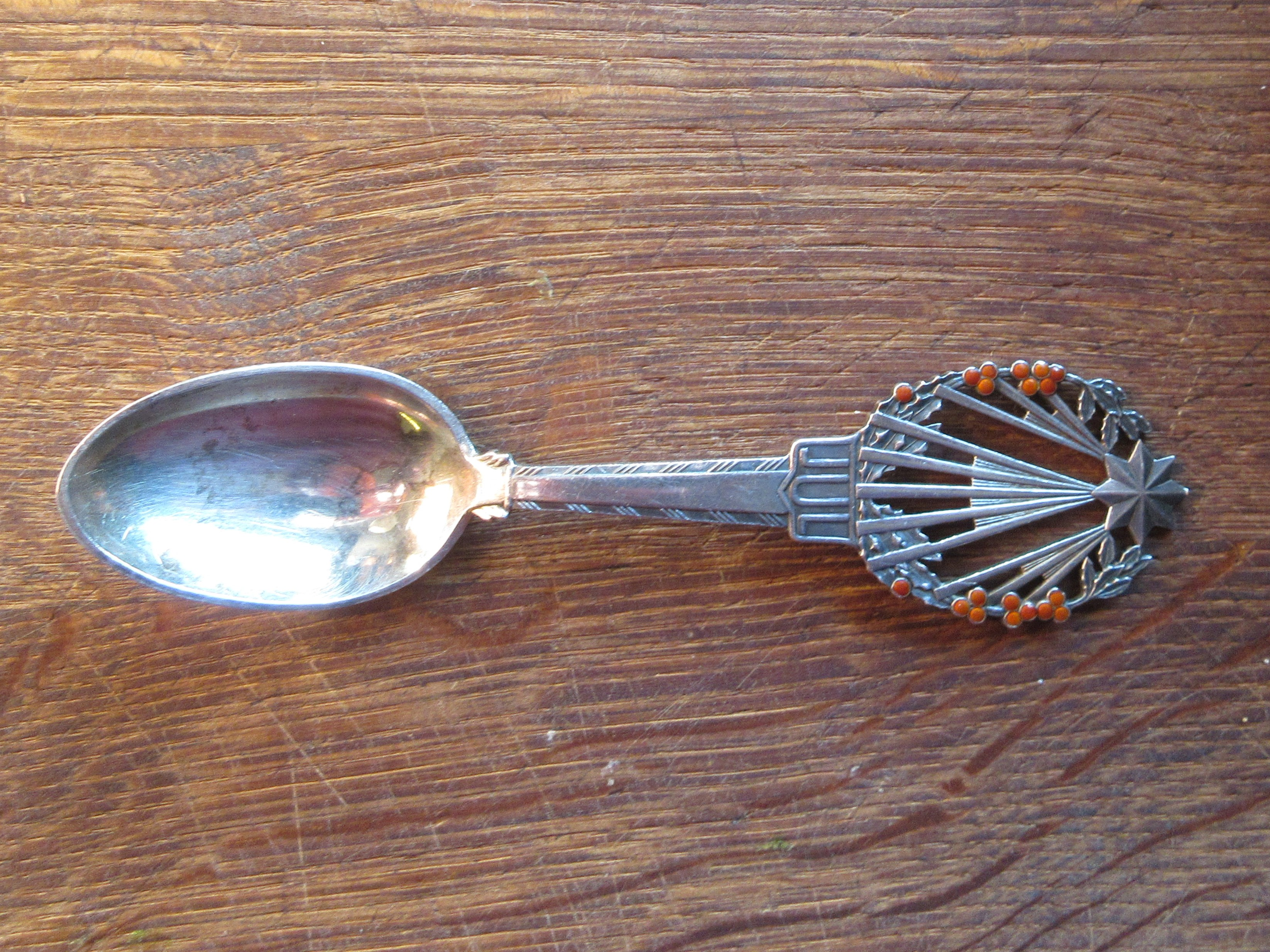
A. Michelsen 1922 christmas spoon, designed by Bertha Dorph.

Dorph also worked as a designer, particularly with silverware and furniture. From 1902 to 1915, together with her husband she ran an art school. In 1915, she became a member of the Academy's committee for the Draftsmanship and Design School for Women (Tegne- og Kunstindustriskolen for Kvinder) and in 1916 she was a co-founder of the Female Artists Society (Kvindelige Kunstneres Samfund).

Bertha Dorph died in Hillerød on 25 February 1960 and is buried in Søllerød Cemetery.

== Awards ==
In 1907, Bertha Dorph was awarded the Thorvaldsen Medal for her painting Et besøg hos den unge barselskone (A Visit to the Young Maternity Patient).
