= Astrid Aagesen =

Danish-Swedish designer and metalworker

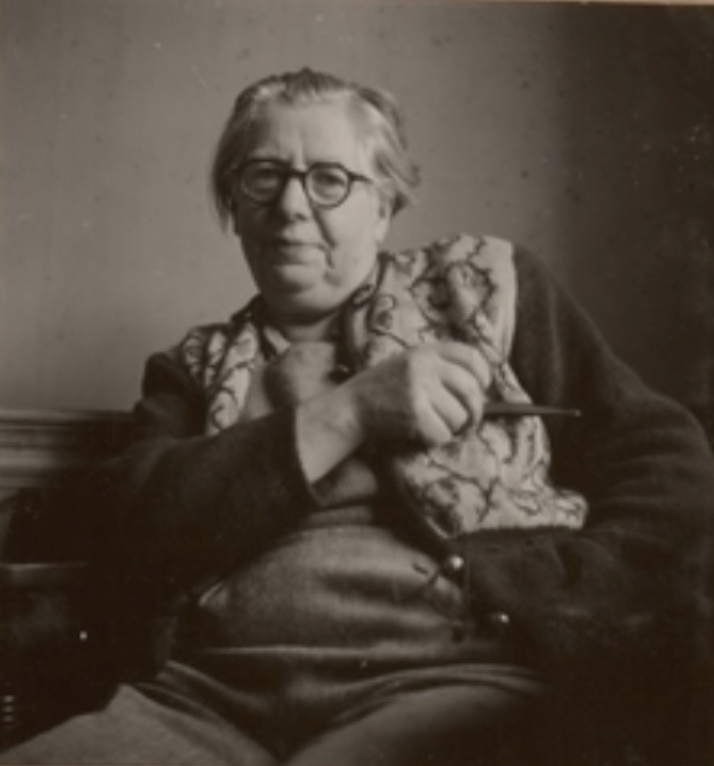
- Born: 25 November 1883; Silkeborg, Denmark
- Died: 26 September 1965 (aged 81); Ängelholm, Sweden
- Occupations: Metalworker, designer, businesswoman
- Notable work: Globe monument to Tycho Brahe in Helsingborg

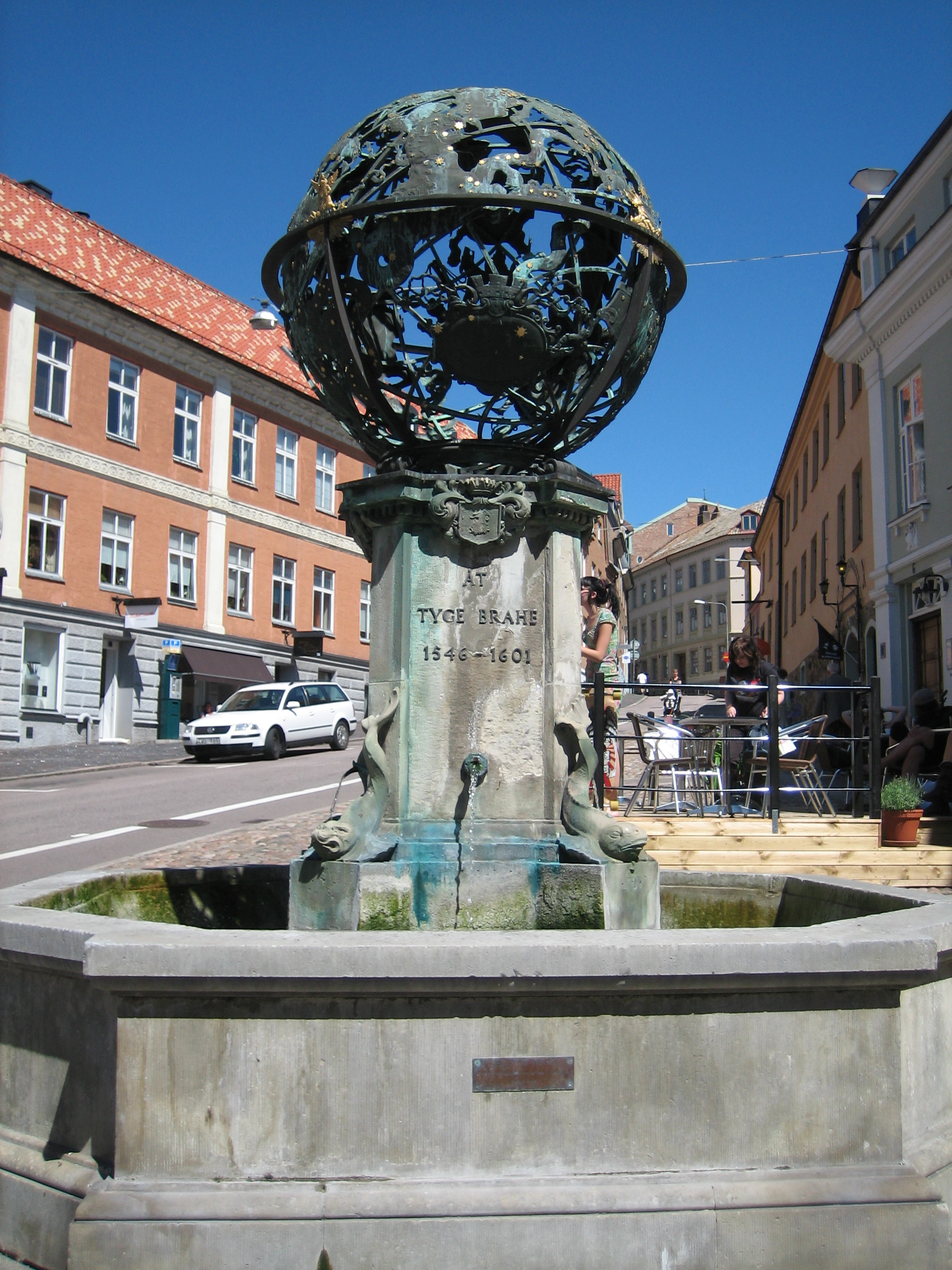
The Tycho Brahe monument in Helsingborg, globe by Astrid Aagesen

Astrid Marie-Frederike Aagesen (1883–1965) was a Danish-Swedish designer who crafted objects in many kinds of metals. From 1919 until 1937, she lived in Helsingborg, Sweden, where she made the globe for the city's monument to astronomer Tycho Brahe.

== Biography ==
Aagesen was born on 25 November 1883 in Silkeborg in the centre of Jutland, Denmark. She was one of six siblings born to parents who owned an inn there. Artistically inclined, she first aimed to become a sculptor but after moving to Copenhagen around 1900, she turned her attention to becoming a silversmith instead. At first, she had to make her living as a maid, but by 1903, she was working as an apprentice metalworker.

Aagesen studied craftsmanship at the Draftsmanship and Design School for Women (Tegne- og Kunstindustriskolen for Kvinder) and the Technical School in Copenhagen as well as in Germany, Norway, Sweden, Italy and France.

=== Metalworker ===
After moving to Helsingborg, in 1918–1919, she was appointed the supervisor of a metalworking workshop but soon left to open her own small shop in 1920 under her own name and "she specialised in working with tin, a metal that had been neglected for a long time at that point, by both designers and customers." She also worked with pewter, copper, bronze and silver.

Several of her pieces were selected for the Jubilee Exhibition in Gothenburg in 1923, and again at the Paris Exhibition in 1925, where she won a grand prize. More international exhibitions followed during the 1930s after her work appeared in Paris, Barcelona and the United States during the 1920s.

She often worked with noted designers including Hugo Gehlin, Ivar Johnson, Göte Bergsten and Gösta Adrian-Nilsson. Aagesen collaborated with Göte Bergsten to create the sculpture Allvar in 1929, which was made entirely out of snow in the main square Stortorget in Stockholm.

=== Brahe monument ===
Aagesen is best known for her contribution to the fountain sculpture Tycho Brahe's monument, complete with constellations. She was instructed to create the work based on the design by the architect Gustaf Wilhelmsson Widmark.

Hugo Gehlin designed the archangel models for the fountain’s globe and Göte Bergsten carefully chased the star reliefs designed by Astrid Aagesen. The reliefs awoke great attention since they portrayed several local celebrities, among them Astrid Aagesen herself, as could clearly be seen when they were finally completed. The design was declared to be a coup and was written about all over the country, although not always in positive terms. Even the international press sat up and took notice.

Other notable works by Aagesen in Helsingborg include a ceiling lamp in Jacob Hansen's house, an altarpiece for the church in Gustav Adolf, and a crucifix for the Gustav Adolf community center.

=== Later years ===
With the start of World War II, she moved several times using a portion of her home as a gallery and workshop. Eventually, she retired altogether but continued to remain artistically active the rest of her life. Just before she died, her work was the subject of an exhibition at the St. Nicolaus Gallery. In addition, she delivered one of her works to the Maria parish hall in Helsingborg.

Astrid Aagesen died on 26 September 1965 in Ängelholm, Sweden.
