= Charlotte Klein =

Danish educator and women's rights activist

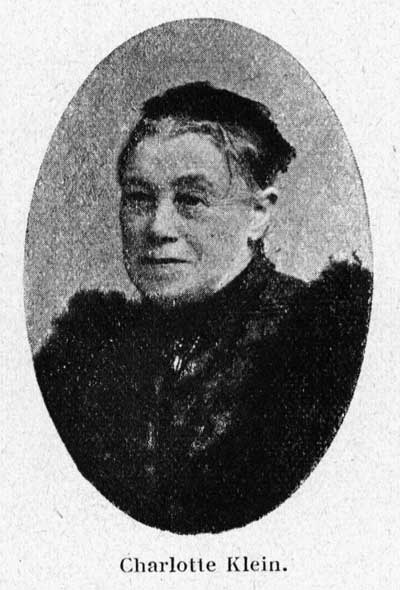
Charlotte Klein (c.1913)

Charlotte Bolette Klein née Unna (1834–1915) was a Danish educator and women's rights activist. A motivated teacher, from the mid-1870s until 1907 she was the principal of the Arts and Crafts School for Women in Copenhagen. Klein was a member of the Danish Women's Society and a strong supporter of women's suffrage. Shortly before her death, she published her ideas in Hvad jeg venter af Kvinderne (What I Expect of Women).

== Early life and education ==
Born on 29 October 1834 in Helsingør, Charlotte Bolette Unna was the daughter of the merchant Simon Unna (1792–1852) and Johanne Marie Schrøder (1800–1877). Brought up in a prosperous home, she received a good general education, including piano lessons. From the age of 12, she showed great interest in woman's place in society.

== Affiliations ==
In her thirties, Klein established a close friendship with the feminist Mathilde Fibiger who moved to Helsingør in 1864. Her husband, the architect Vilhelm Klein whom she married in October 1866, also supported better conditions for women.

Encouraged by Fibiger, in 1871 she became an enthusiastic member of the newly established Danish Women's Society. One of the Society's principal objectives was to establish schools where women could receive training allowing them to work professionally.

As a result, when the organization founded the Arts and Crafts School for Women in 1875, Klein became its principal. In 1881, the school moved into a new building on H. C. Andersens Boulevard, designed by her husband. Initially she taught at the school without remuneration. With her husband's support, she remained as head until her retirement in 1907. Though they had no children of their own, the couple took special care of Sophy A. Christensen who later became a prominent furniture designer.

Charlotte Klein died on 9 March 1915 in the Copenhagen district of Frederiksberg and is buried is Assistens Cemetery.
