= Sophie Alberti =

Pioneering Danish women's rights activist

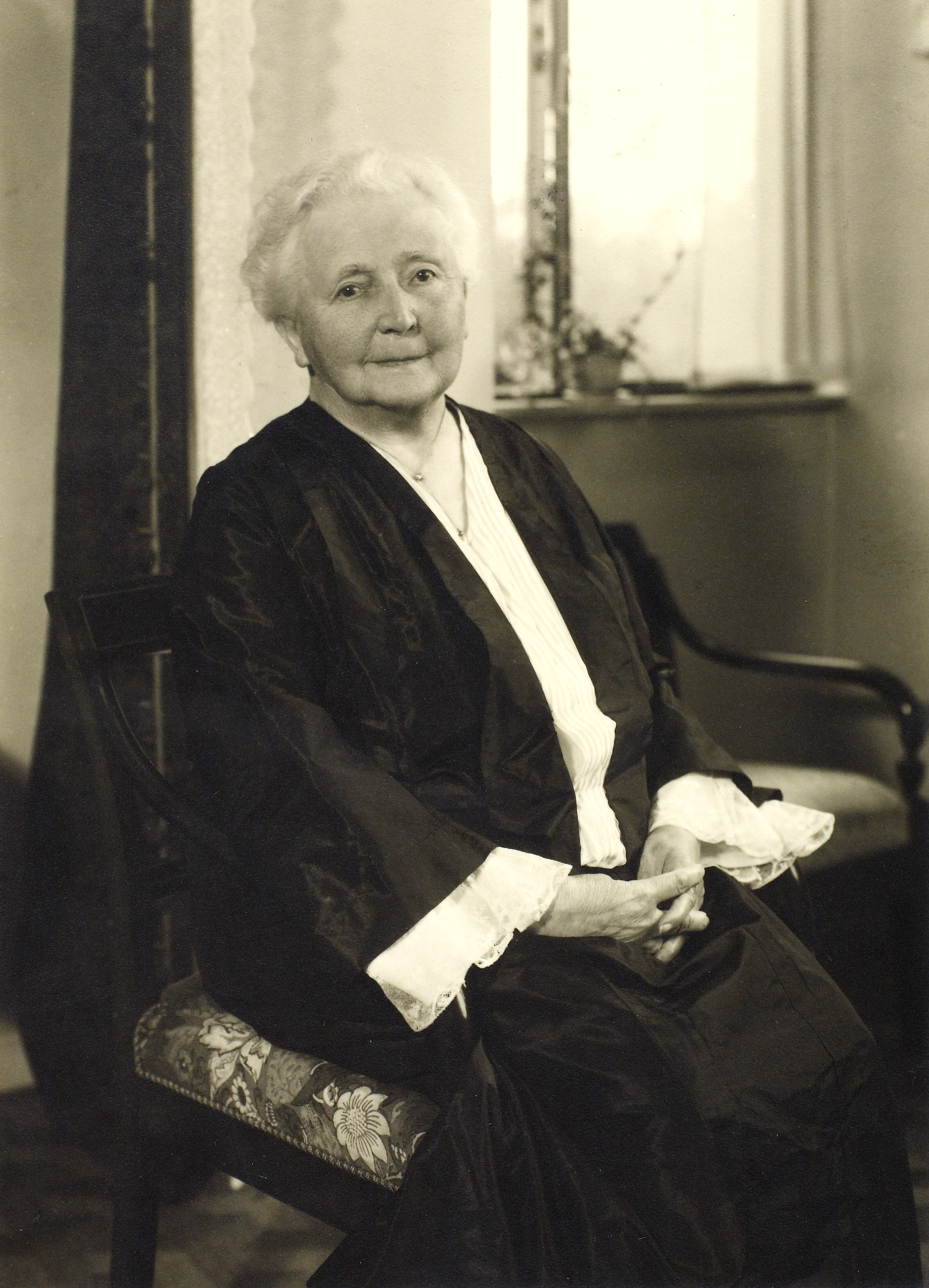
Sophie Alberti

Mathilde Elise Sophie Alberti (19 September 1846 – 17 June 1947) was a pioneering Danish women's rights activist and a leading member of Kvindelig Læseforening (Women Readers' Association), increasing membership to some 4,600 by 1919.

== Biography ==
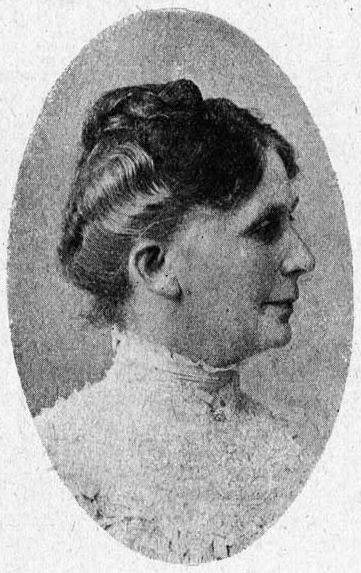
Sophie Alberti

Alberti was born on 19 September 1846 in Copenhagen, Denmark, the daughter of the high court procurator and Venstre politician, Carl Christian Alberti (1814–90), and Albertine Sophie Frederikke Westergaard (1814–1901). She was the eldest of four children, her brother Peter Adler Alberti gaining prominence as the instigator of the 1908 Alberti scandal.

Attached to her parents, she remained in the family home until they died. When she was only 16, they allowed her to go to Paris, France, on a study trip with her friend Tagea Rovsing. The two were active in promoting a woman's right to study and followed the parliamentary debates on housewives' rights to an income. After the Women Readers' Association had been established by Rovsing and Sophie Petersen in 1872, Alberti became an active member two years later.
