= Margrethe Hald =

Danish textile historian and curator

Margrethe Hald (10 February 1897 - 19 May 1982) was a Danish textile historian and curator at the National Museum of Denmark. A major contributor to international textile research, she received a D.Phil. in 1950 for her thesis Olddanske tekstiler.

== Biography ==
Born in the village of Neder Vrigsted, near Horsens in eastern Jutland, Hald was one of four children who were raised on a farming estate managed by her mother after her father died when she was three years old. Interested in art from an early age, Hald had learned how to weave in the village and at the high schools at Vrigsted and Askov. While at the Design School for Women (Tegne- og Kunstindustriskolen for Kvinder), she was encouraged by Elna Mygdal (1868–1940), to focus on the history of textiles at the National Museum.

As a result of her research, in 1930 she wrote a dissertation on Brikvævning, presenting prehistoric textile techniques. In 1935, together with Hans Christian Broholm (1893–1966) of the National Museum of Denmark, she published Danske Broncealders Dragter (Danish Bronze Age costumes). In 1939, after several study trips to Europe, she took up a position at the National Museum of Denmark. In 1947 she was appointed Inspector at the Museum. In 1950 she wrote her thesis despite no academic education and received a D.Phil. for Olddanske tektiler (Gyldendal 1950). An English translation was published in 1980 as Ancient Danish Textiles from Bogs and Burials.

She organized various textile exhibitions, and published a number of works on weaving, old textiles and shoes. She traveled extensively in the Middle East and South America to observe and record the use of looms in other societies. In 1964 she became a knight of the Order of the Dannebrog.

From 2020 onward, the life and work of Margrethe Hald has been researched by the Center for Textile Research at University of Copenhagen. A list of her publications and other material has been published (open access) at the university home page .
