= Kristín Jónsdóttir =

Icelandic painter (1889–1968)

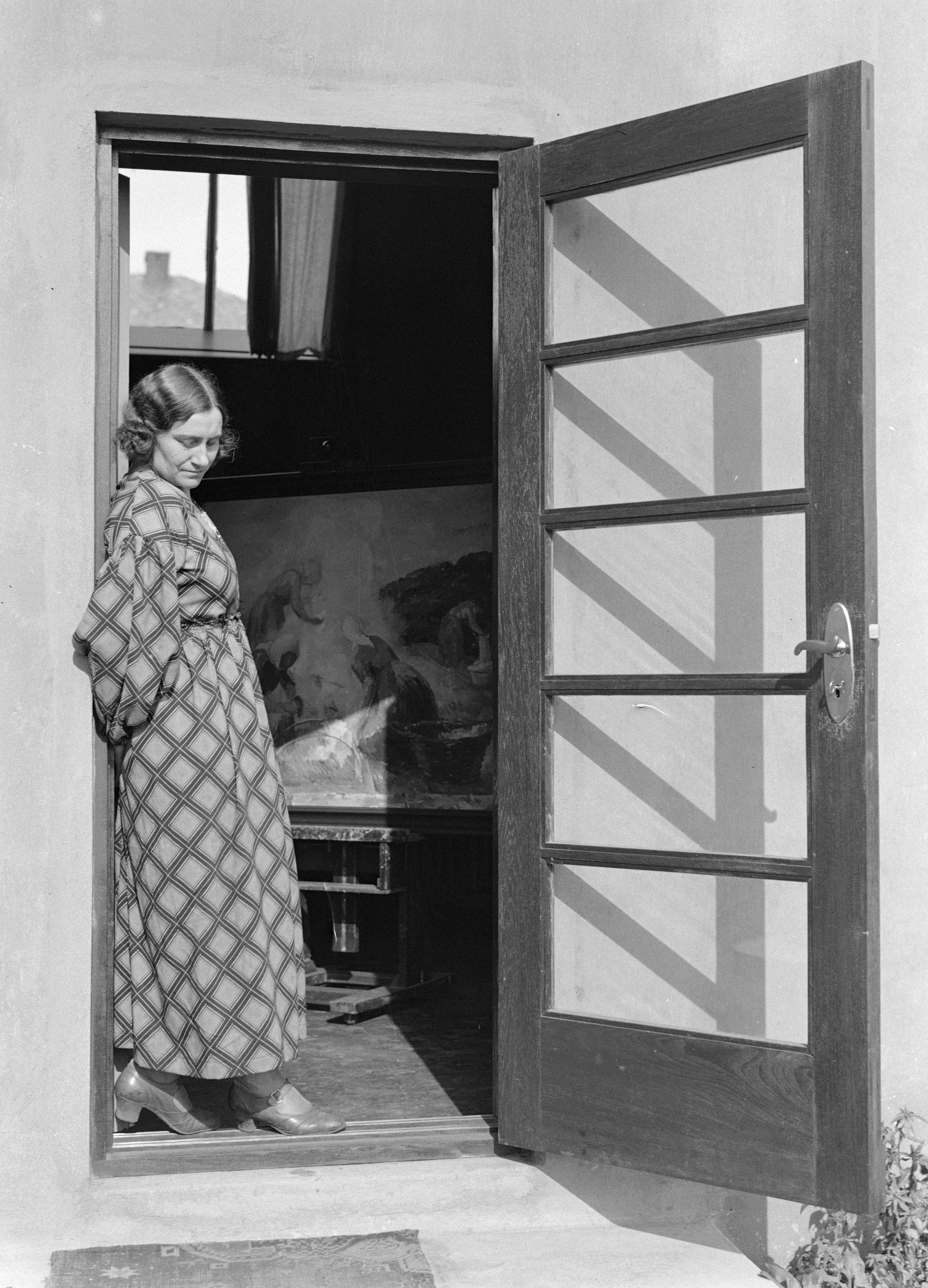
- Photograph of the Icelandic painter Kristín Jónsdóttir (1934)
- Born: 1888
- Died: 1959

Kristín Jónsdóttir, also Kristín Jónsdóttir Stefánsson (1888–1959), was a pioneering female Icelandic painter. A member of the group of artists who associated with the painter Jón Stefánsson, she was inspired by the art of Paul Cézanne and by French Impressionism.

== Early life ==
Born on 25 January 1888 in Arnanes on the Eyjafjörður in northern Iceland, she was the daughter of the shipbuilder Jón Antonsson and Guðlaug Helga Sveinsdóttir. After schooling in Reykjavík, she studied art in Copenhagen, first from 1909 at the Tegne- og Kunstindustriskolen for Kvinder (Women's Art College), then at the Royal Danish Academy of Fine Arts under Valdemar Irminger and Peter Rostrup Bøyesen. In 1916, she became the first Icelandic woman to graduate from the academy.

== Artistic development ==
Together with Júlíana Sveinsdóttir, Kristín Jónsdóttir played a pioneering role in Iceland as a modern female artist. They were both associated with Jón Stefánsson who initially encouraged them to follow the style of Cézanne and Impressionism. Jónsdóttir frequently depicted women at work, including a 1914 painting of women preparing salted cod for export. Her early landscapes often have an Impressionistic look but with time she developed her own style with freer brushstrokes and stronger colour. She also painted portraits, often of children, as well as interiors and still lifes, especially after 1930.

Kristín Jónsdóttir first exhibited her work in Stockholm's Nya Konstgalleriet (1916) and at Christian Larsen's gallery in Copenhagen (1917). She also exhibited at Charlottenborg. Her work was critically acclaimed, especially her Icelandic landscapes.

In 1918, she married Valtýr Stefánsson with whom she returned to Reykjavík in 1924 when he was appointed editor of one of Iceland's newspapers. They had two daughters (1923 and 1925). Kristín Jónsdóttir died in Reykjavík on 24 April 1959.

== Literature ==
- Aðalsteinn Ingólfsson (1987), Kristín Jónsdóttir : listakona í gróandanum, Reykjavík: Bókaútgáfan Þjóðsaga
