= Viggo Pedersen =

Danish landscape painter (1854–1926)

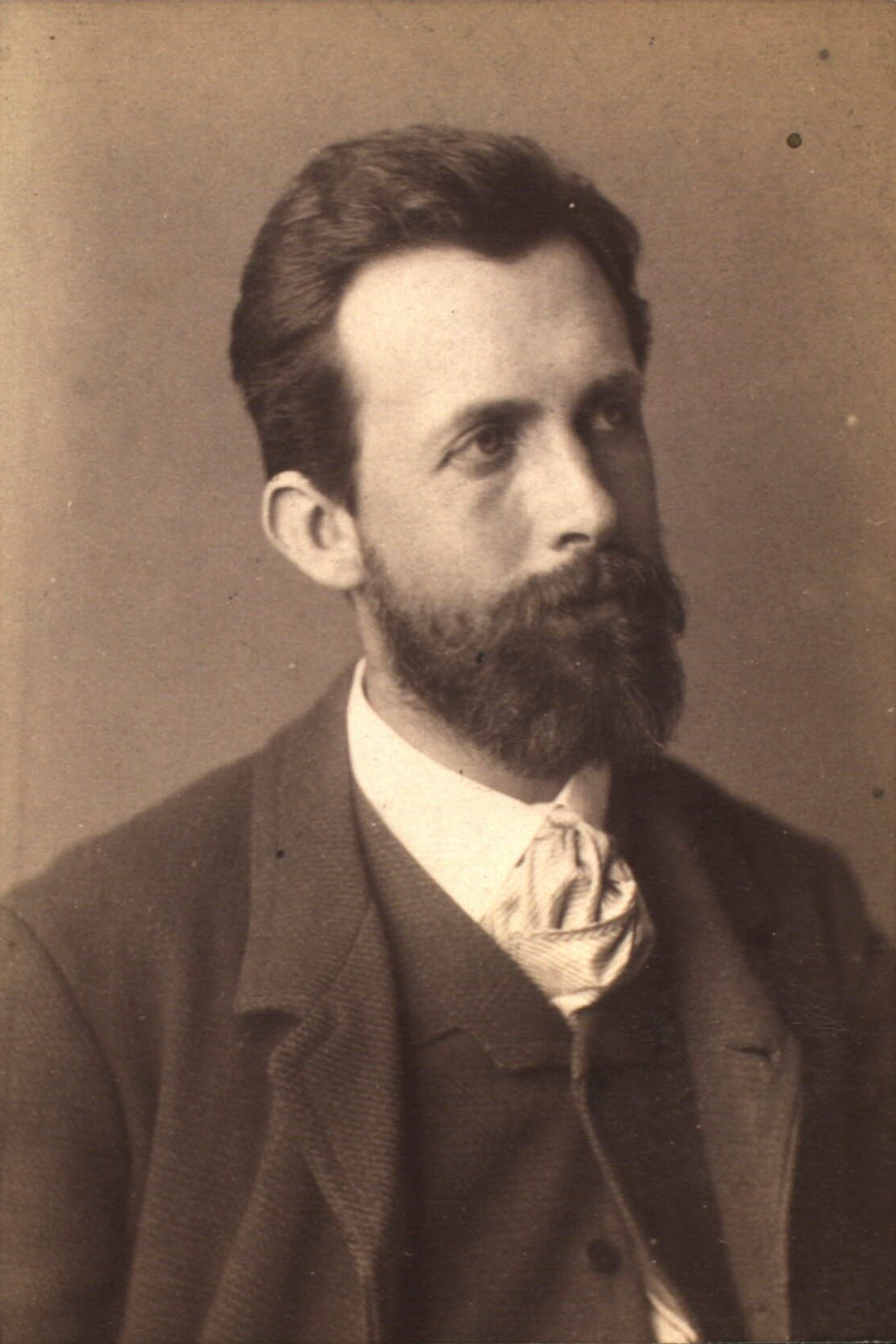
- Born: Viggo Christian Frederik Vilhelm Pedersen; March 11, 1854; Copenhagen, Denmark
- Died: April 19, 1926 (aged 72); Roskilde, Denmark
- Education: Royal Danish Academy of Fine Arts
- Known for: Landscape painting, portraiture, religious art
- Notable work: Sunshine in the Living Room (1888), At the Approach of Night (1890)
- Style: Landscape and figurative painting
- Movement: Danish Golden Age influence
- Spouses: Elisabeth Bella Marie Borup (m. 1884; died 1905); Johanne Louise Aagaard (m. 1906)
- Children: 4, including Stefan Viggo Pedersen, Christen Jul Viggo Pedersen, and Johannes Viggo Pedersen
- Relatives: Vilhelm Pedersen (father), Thorolf Pedersen (brother)
- Awards: Sødring Prize (1877), Annual Medal (1890)

Viggo Christian Frederik Vilhelm Pedersen (March 11, 1854 – April 19, 1926) was a Danish landscape painter who also explored religious, portrait, and domestic art. Known for his vibrant style and rich color palette, Pedersen's works reflect a profound connection to nature and tradition, while embracing modern techniques. He was the son of Vilhelm Pedersen and the brother of Thorolf Pedersen.

== Biography ==
=== Early life and education ===
Pedersen was born in Copenhagen to the premier lieutenant and artist Vilhelm Pedersen and Adolphine Marie Pedersen. His brother was Thorolf Pedersen.

He began his artistic training under his father before studying at the Royal Danish Academy of Fine Arts from 1871 to 1878. While at the Academy, he was mentored by P.C. Skovgaard and Janus la Cour, and his early works exhibited their influence. Pedersen's first major recognition came in 1877 when he received the Sødring Prize for his painting Outside a Brewery.

=== Career ===
Pedersen traveled extensively throughout his career, visiting Germany (1873), Paris (1881), Italy, Switzerland, and Holland. These journeys, particularly his time in Paris, exposed him to modern French landscape art, which significantly influenced his style. Works like A Rutted Path under Old Trees (1882), acquired by the Statens Museum for Kunst, and Sunshine in the Living Room (1888) demonstrate the impact of these experiences.

In 1890, Pedersen's painting At the Approach of Night earned him the prestigious Annual Medal. He later joined the Free Exhibition, becoming a prominent contributor from 1891, and was elected to the Royal Danish Academy's plenary assembly in 1904, serving on its council from 1908 to 1911.

He exhibited in Paris in 1889 and 1900 at the Universal Exhibition.

=== Personal life ===
Pedersen married twice. His first marriage, in 1884, was to Elisabeth Bella Marie Borup, with whom he had three sons: Christen Jul Viggo Pedersen, an instructor; Stefan Viggo Pedersen, a painter and illustrator; and Johannes Viggo Pedersen, a pianist and organist. His daughter, Ruth Sora Viggo Pedersen, died young. After Elisabeth's death in 1905, he married Johanne Louise Aagaard in 1906.

== Artistic style ==
Primarily a landscape painter, Pedersen's works are characterized by their vibrant colors and atmospheric depth. He painted rural scenes, domestic interiors, and biblical compositions, including The Annunciation and Isaac Sees Rebecca Approaching, the latter noted for its grandeur and originality.

In his later years, Pedersen produced numerous works inspired by the landscapes of Zealand and Italy, such as The Angel and the Women at the Tomb of Christ. His paintings often balance naturalistic detail with a poetic sensibility, drawing comparisons to Golden Age ideals.

== Legacy and collections ==
Pedersen's works are part of several major collections, including the Statens Museum for Kunst, Hirschsprung Collection, National Museum of Norway, Nationalmuseum, Nivaagaard, and the Finnish National Gallery. He also illustrated Danish poems and remained influential in the Danish art scene until his death in Roskilde in 1926.

== Gallery ==
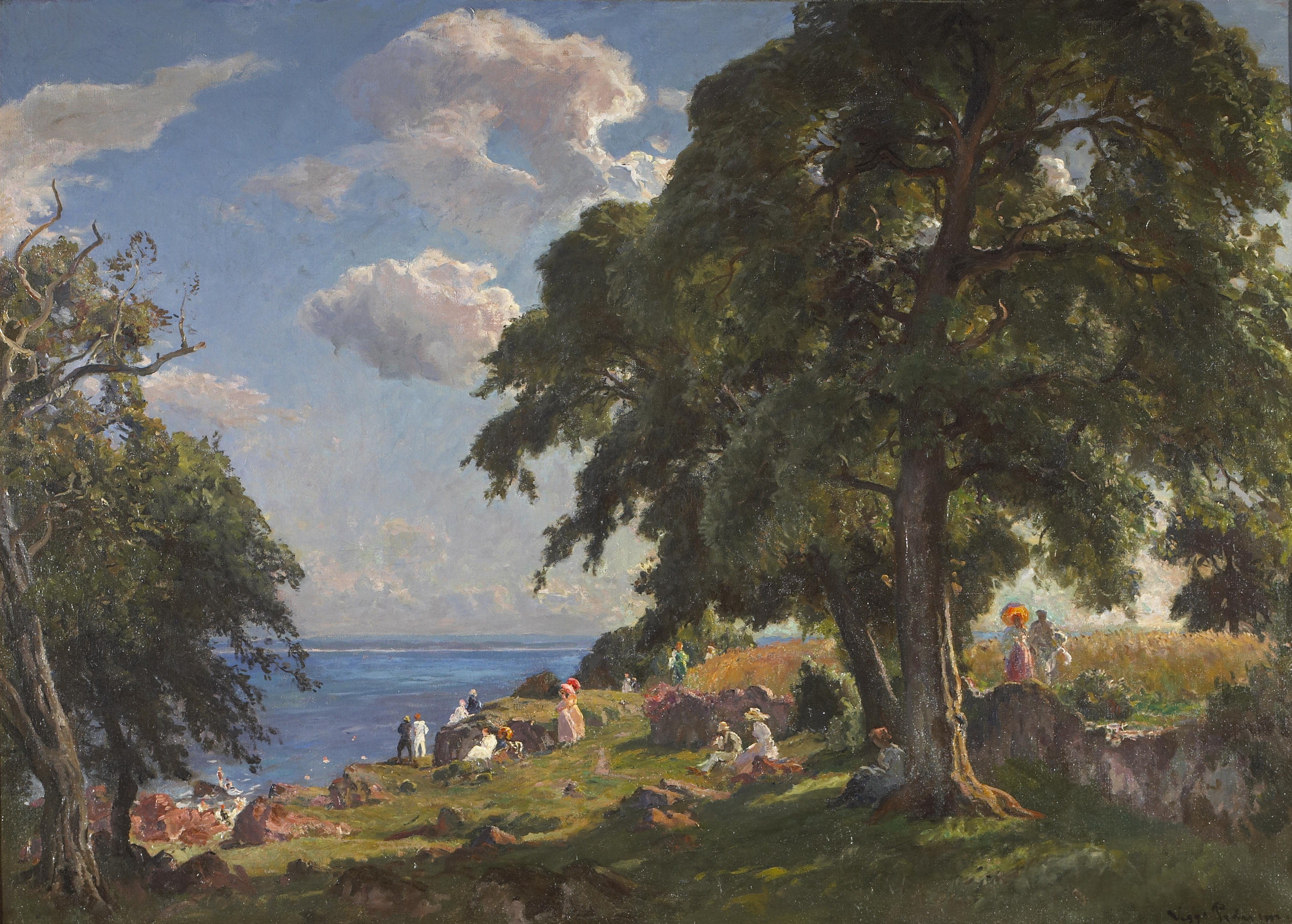
Figures Bathing by the Danish Coast

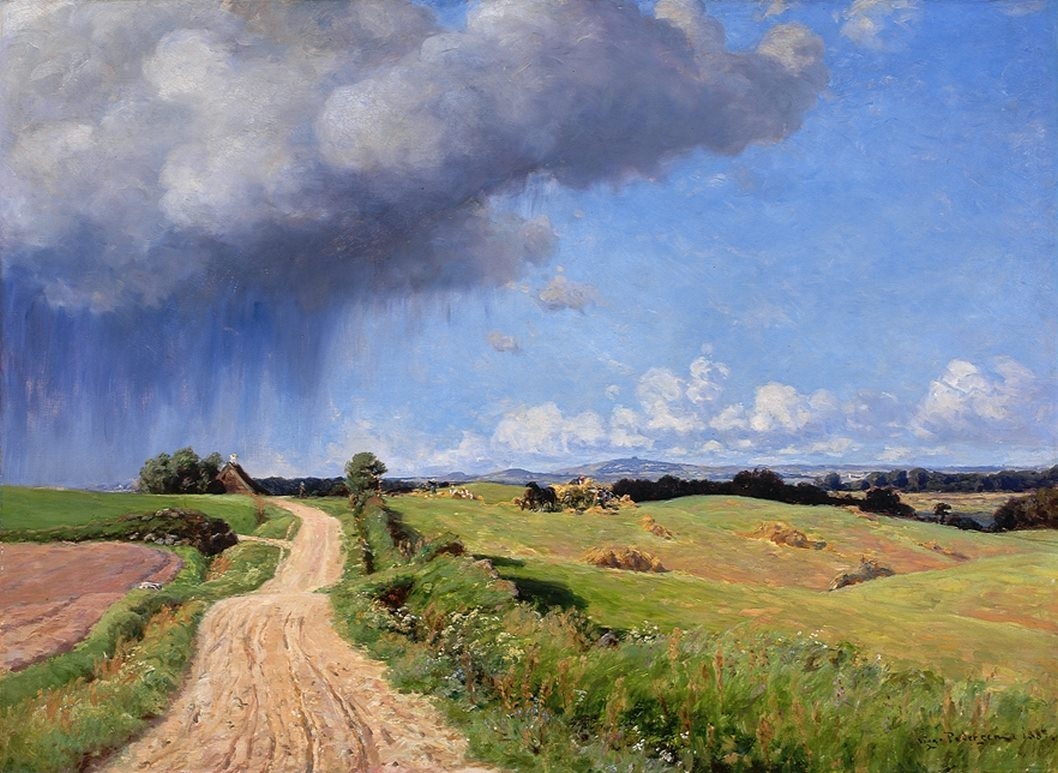
Summer Showers (1887)

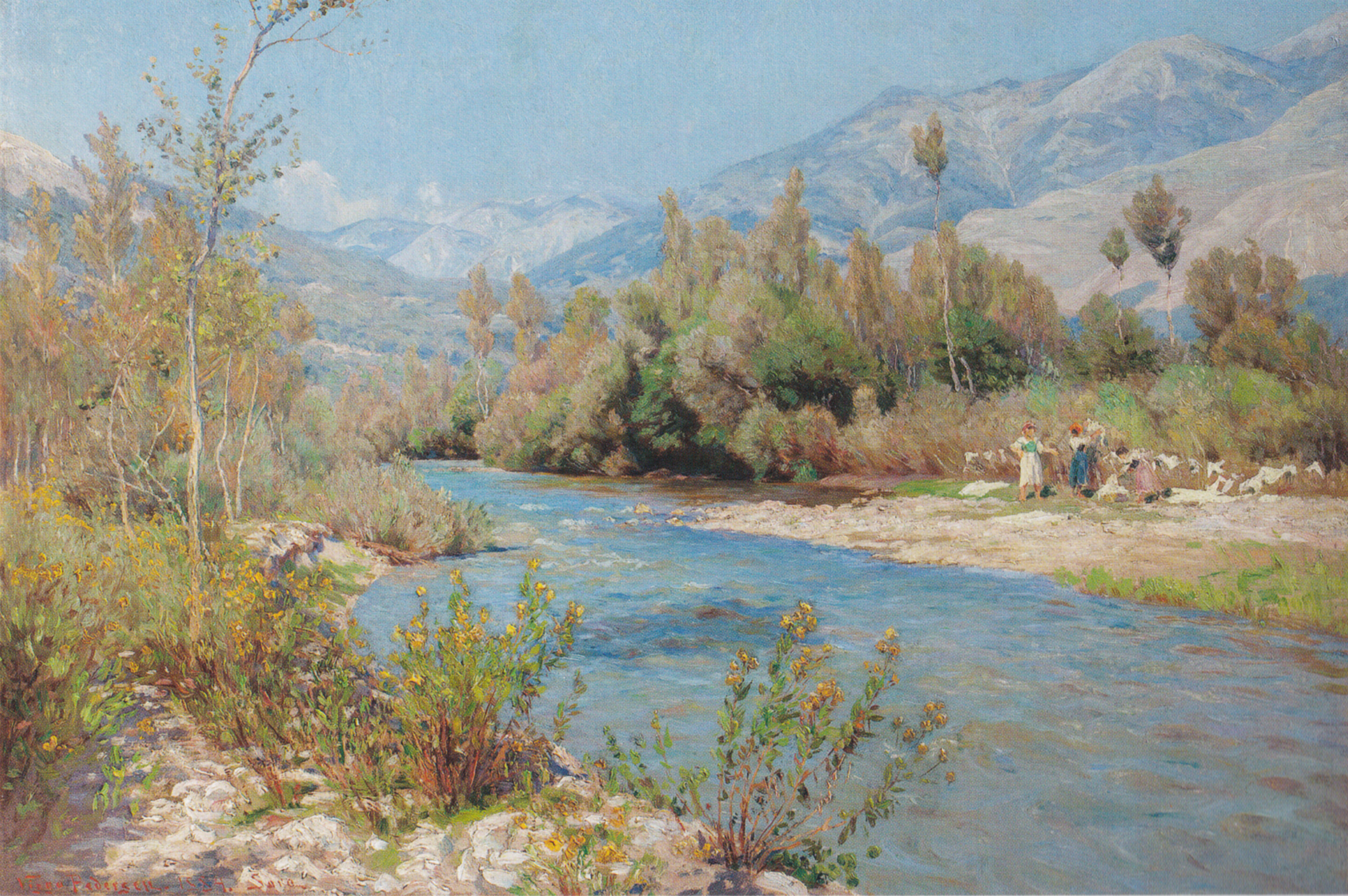
The Liri River with Washerwomen (1884)

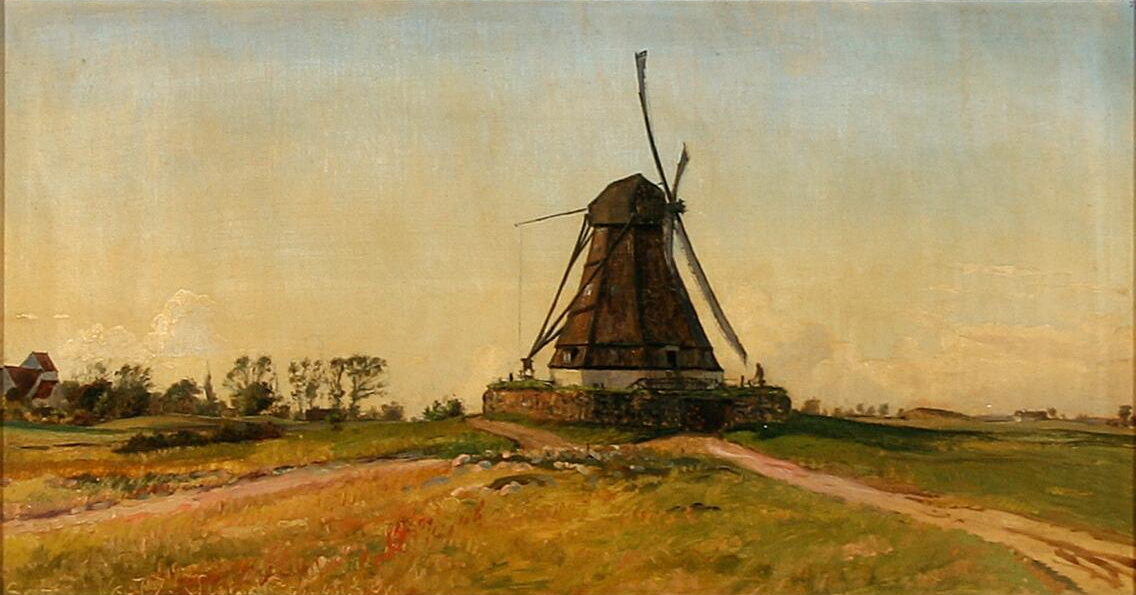
Autumn Landscape with a Windmill (1877)

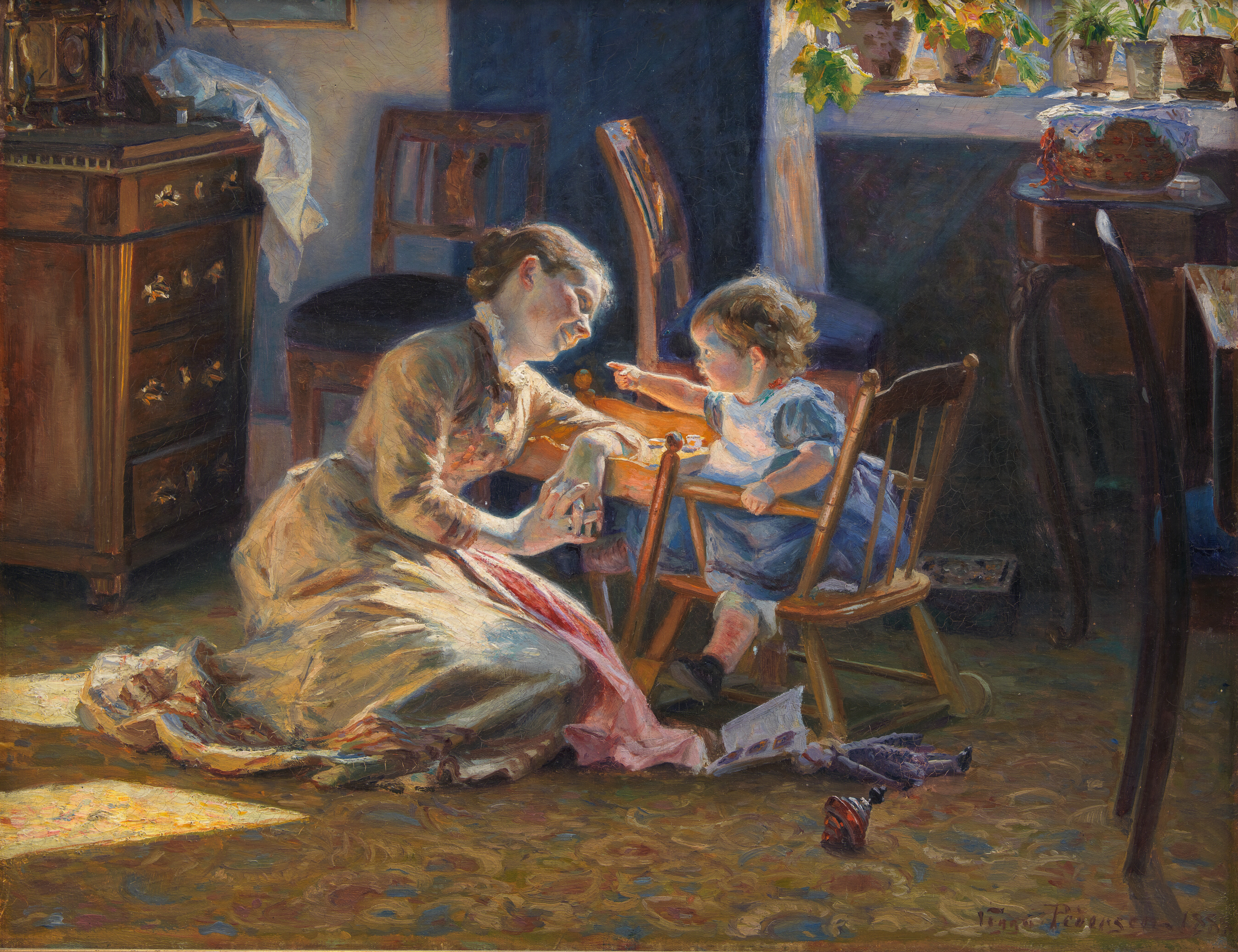
Sunshine in the Living Room: The Artist's Wife and Child (1888), Statens Museum for Kunst

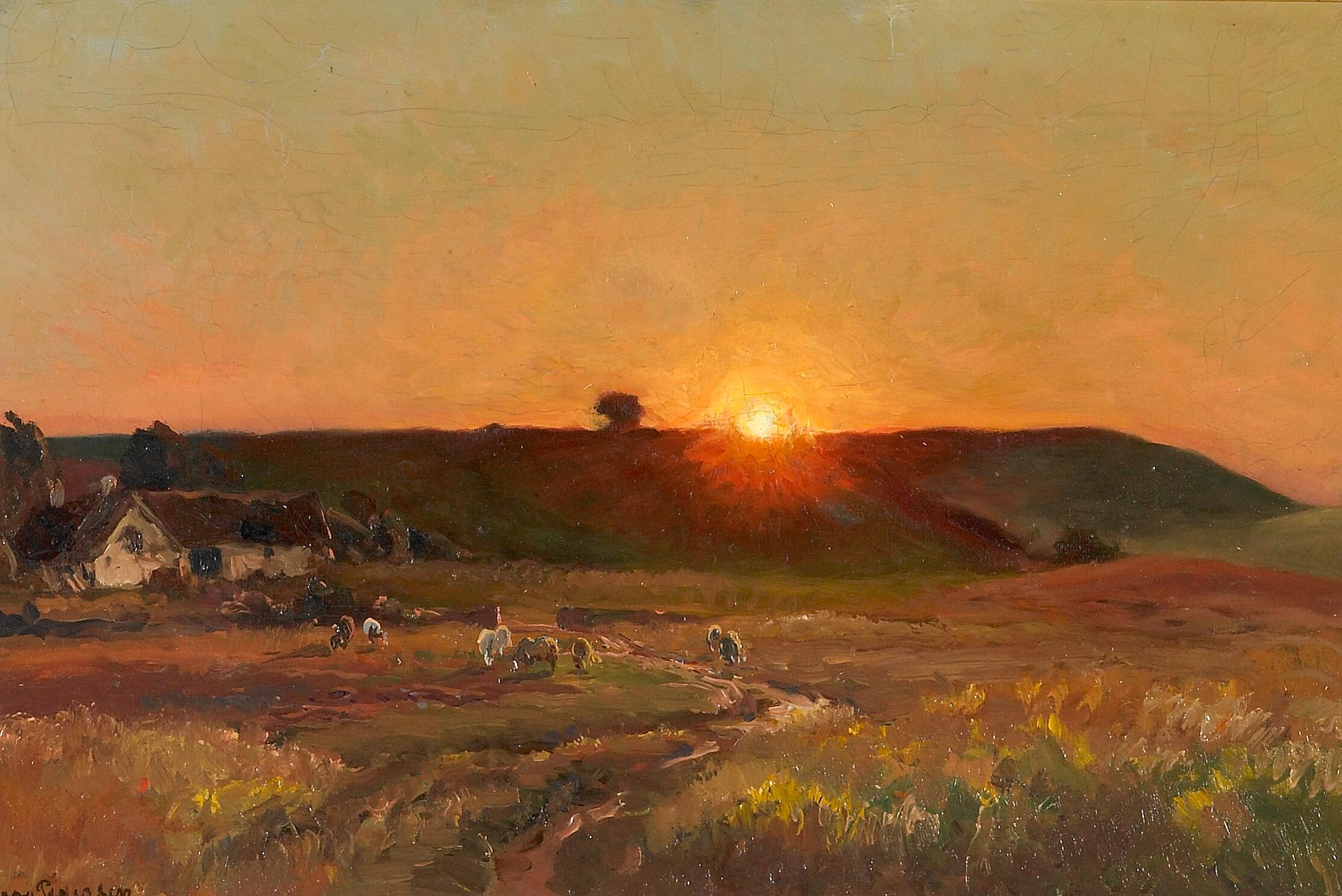
Midsummer Eve (1889), Skamstrup

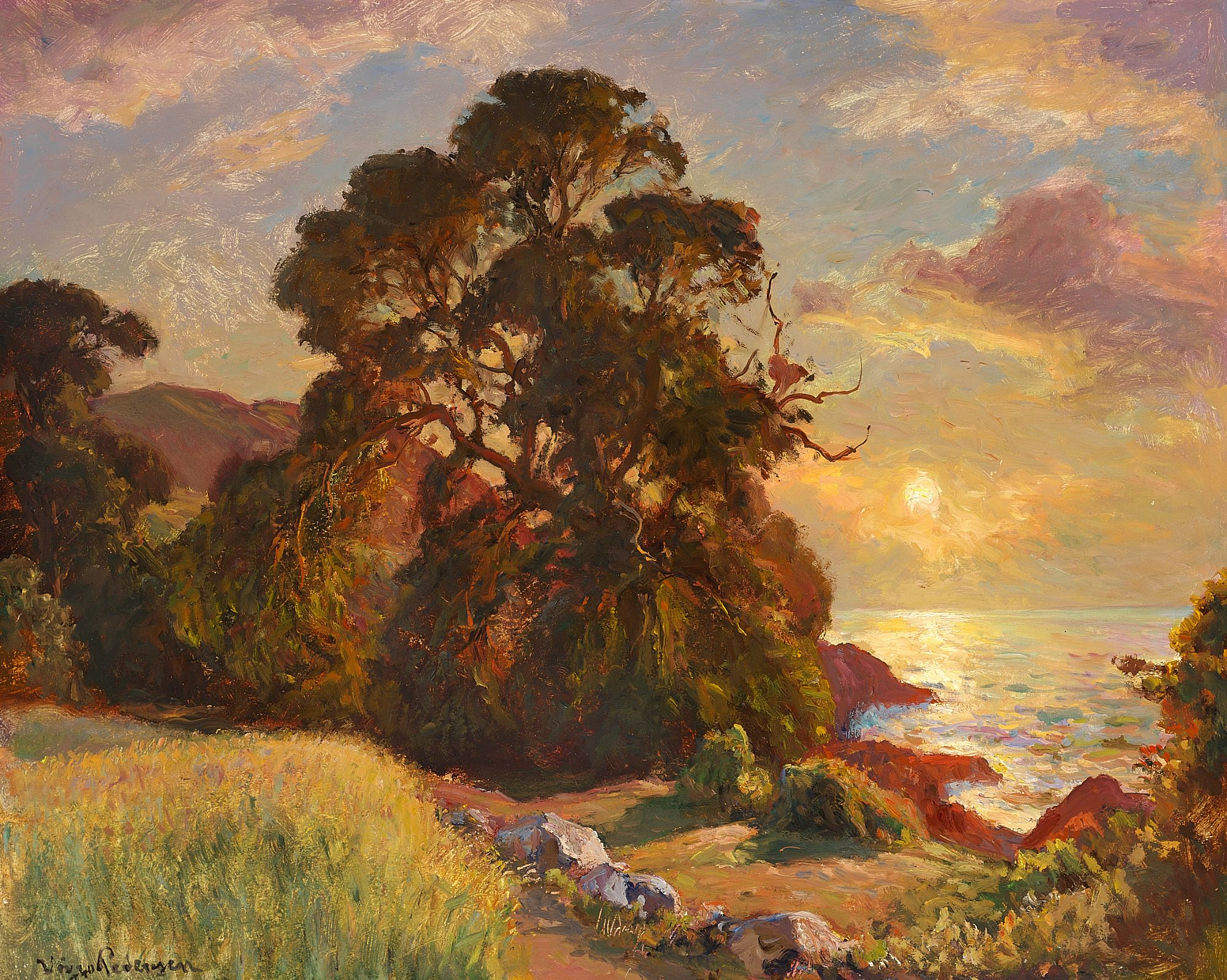
Sunset Over the Sea, Haga, Kullen (1916)

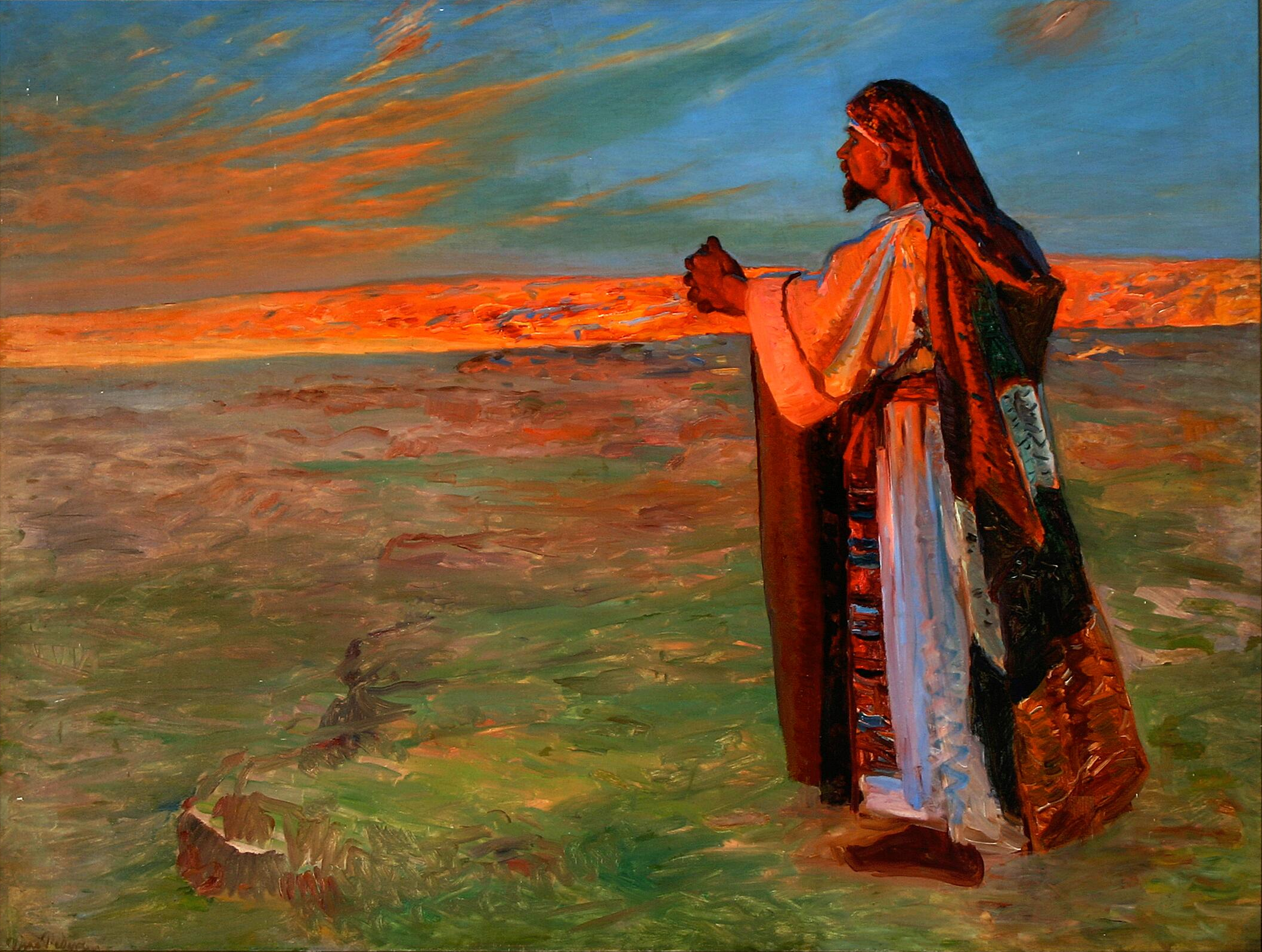
Isaac Sees Rebekah Approaching (Study)

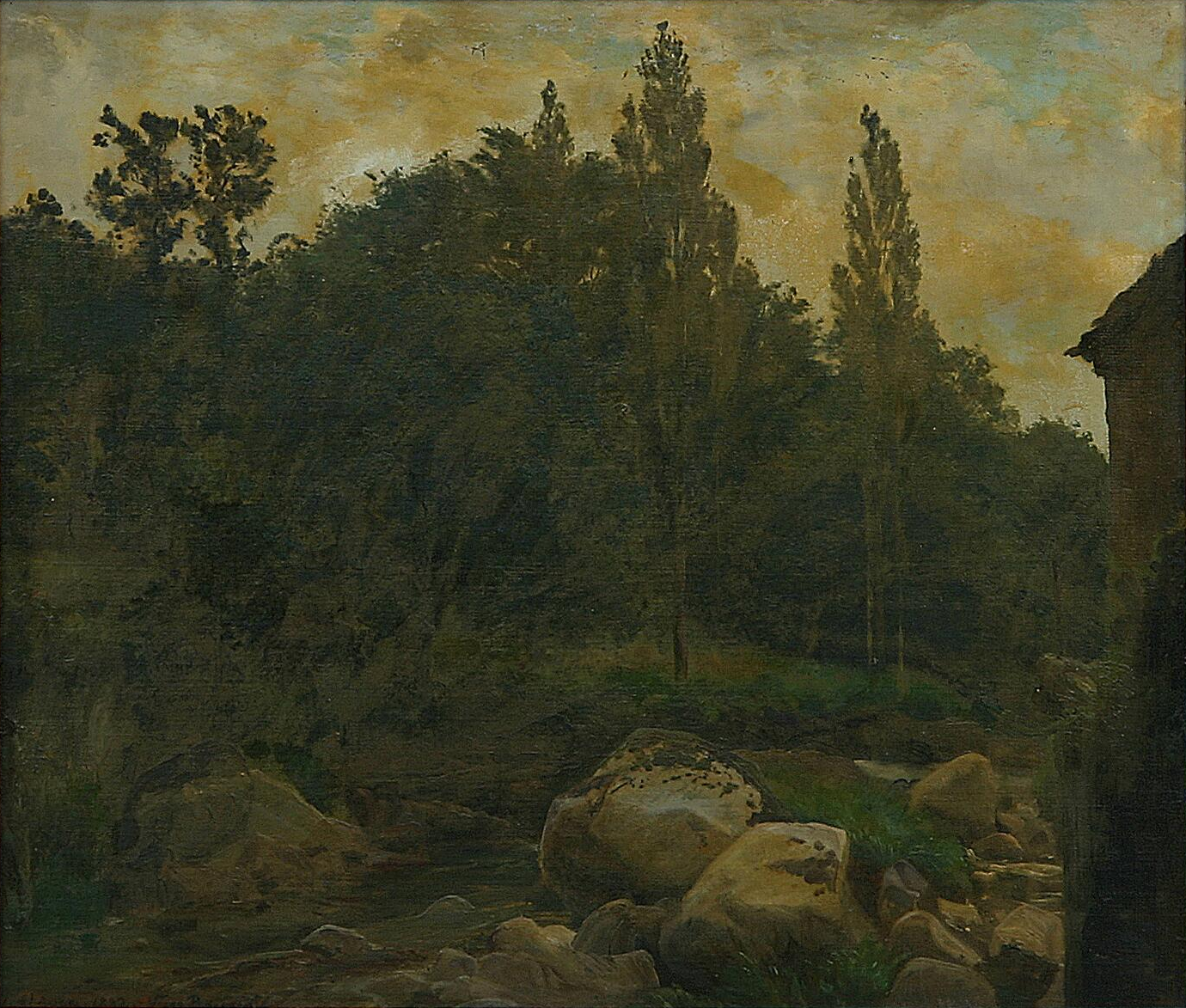
Landscape with Trees and Stones (1882)

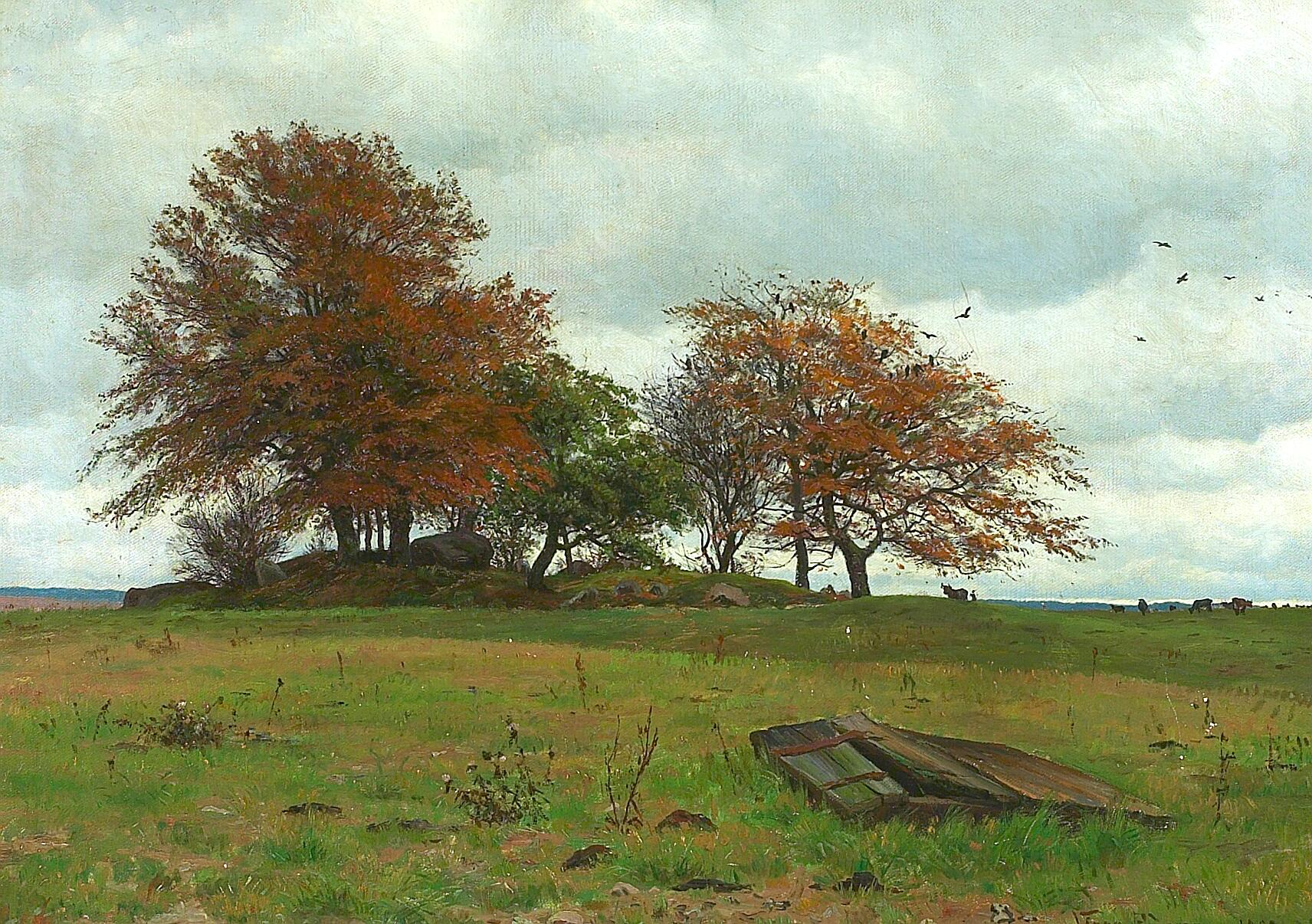
Autumn Landscape with a Dolmen (1882)
