= Kvindelig Læseforening =

Library for women in Copenhagen, Denmark

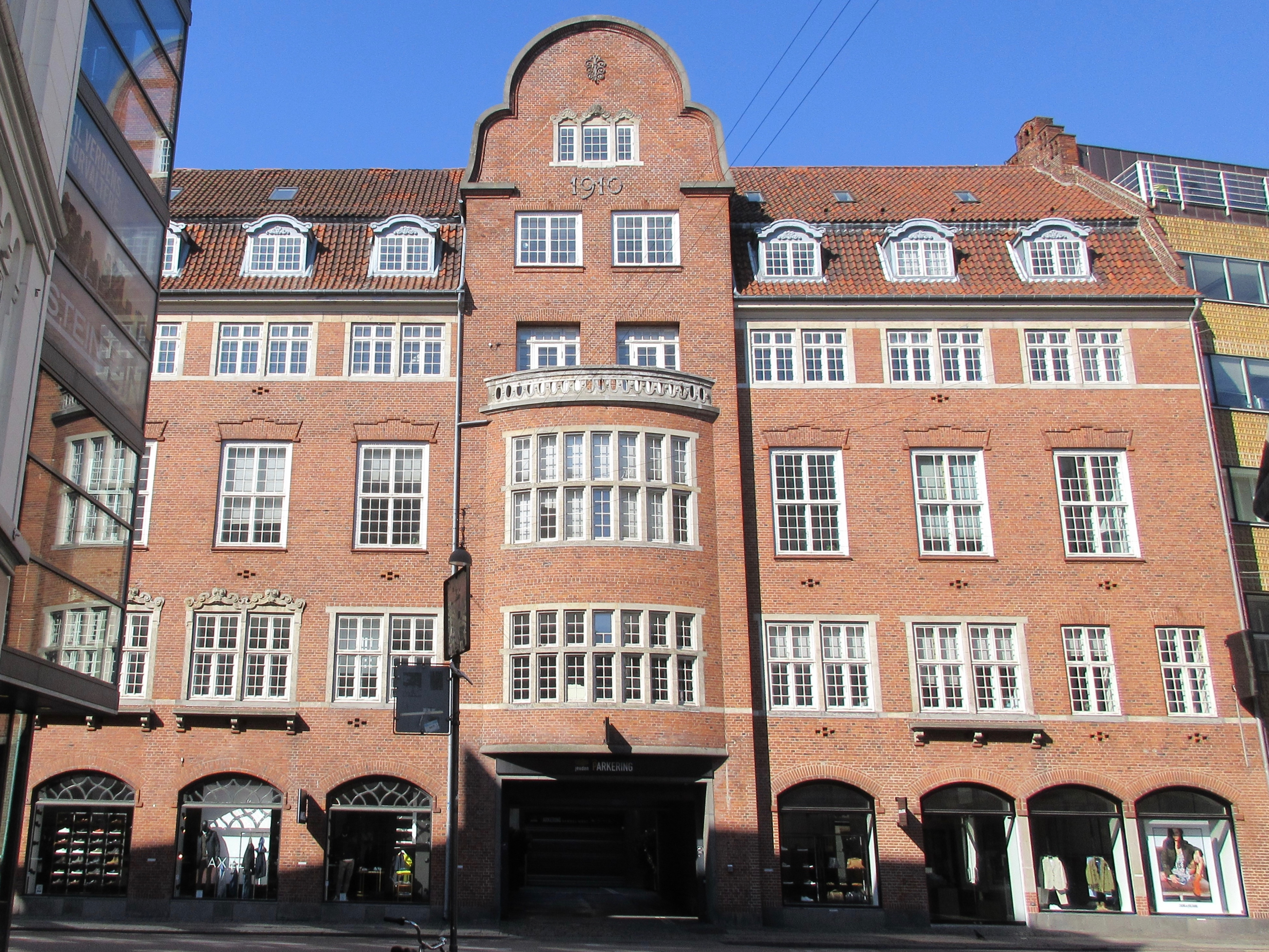
The Women Readers' Assiciation's former building on Gammel Mønt in Copenhagen

Kvindelig Læserforening (English: Women Readers' Association) was a membership-based, private library for women which existed from 1872 until 1945 in Copenhagen, Denmark. Its former building on Gammel Mønt (No. 1) is designed by Ulrik Plesner. It now houses the newspaper Weekendavisen.

== History ==
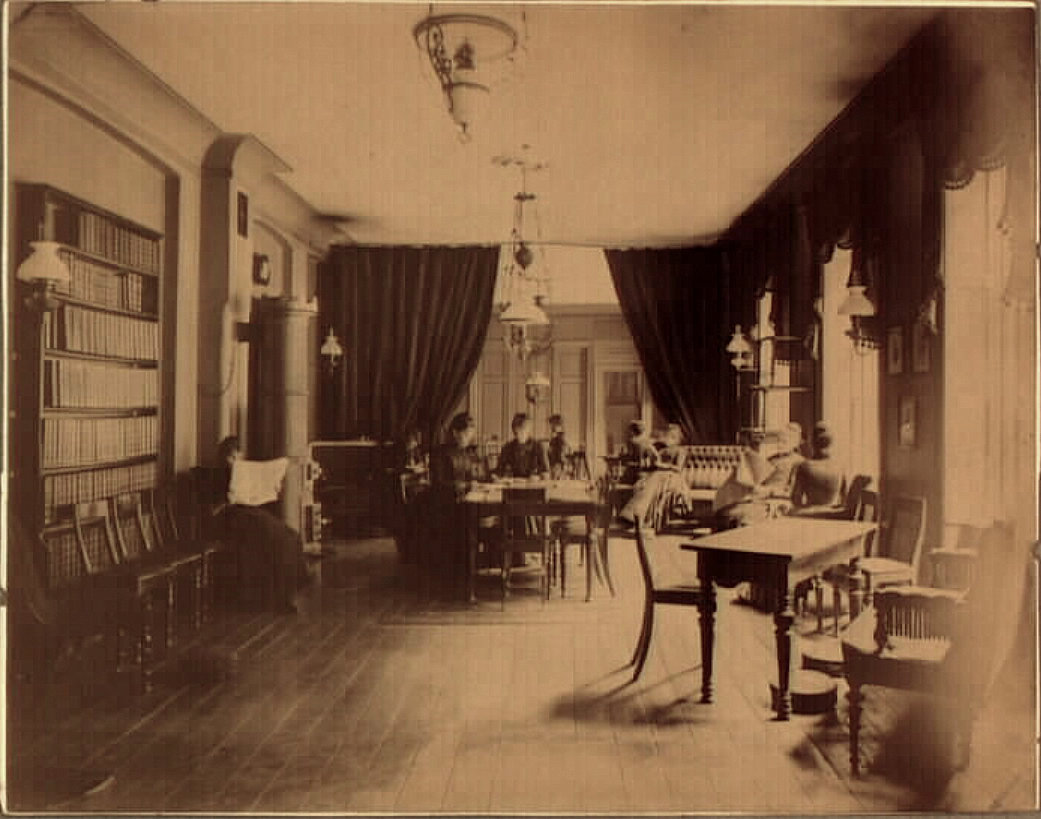
The Women Readers' Association's premises on Amagertorv photographed by royal photographer Mary Steen

Kvindelig Læserforening was founded at the initiative of Sophie Petersen (née Alberti) on 1 October 1872 and was inspired by Läsesalong för Damer in Sweden. The library initially comprised 1,007 volumes. The number of members quickly grew and it outgrew its premises several times.

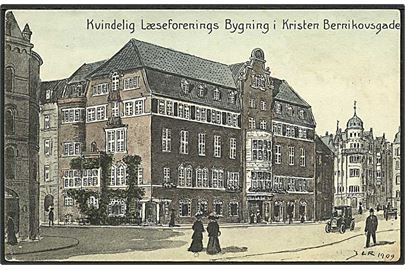
The Women Readers' Association's new building on Gammel Mønt

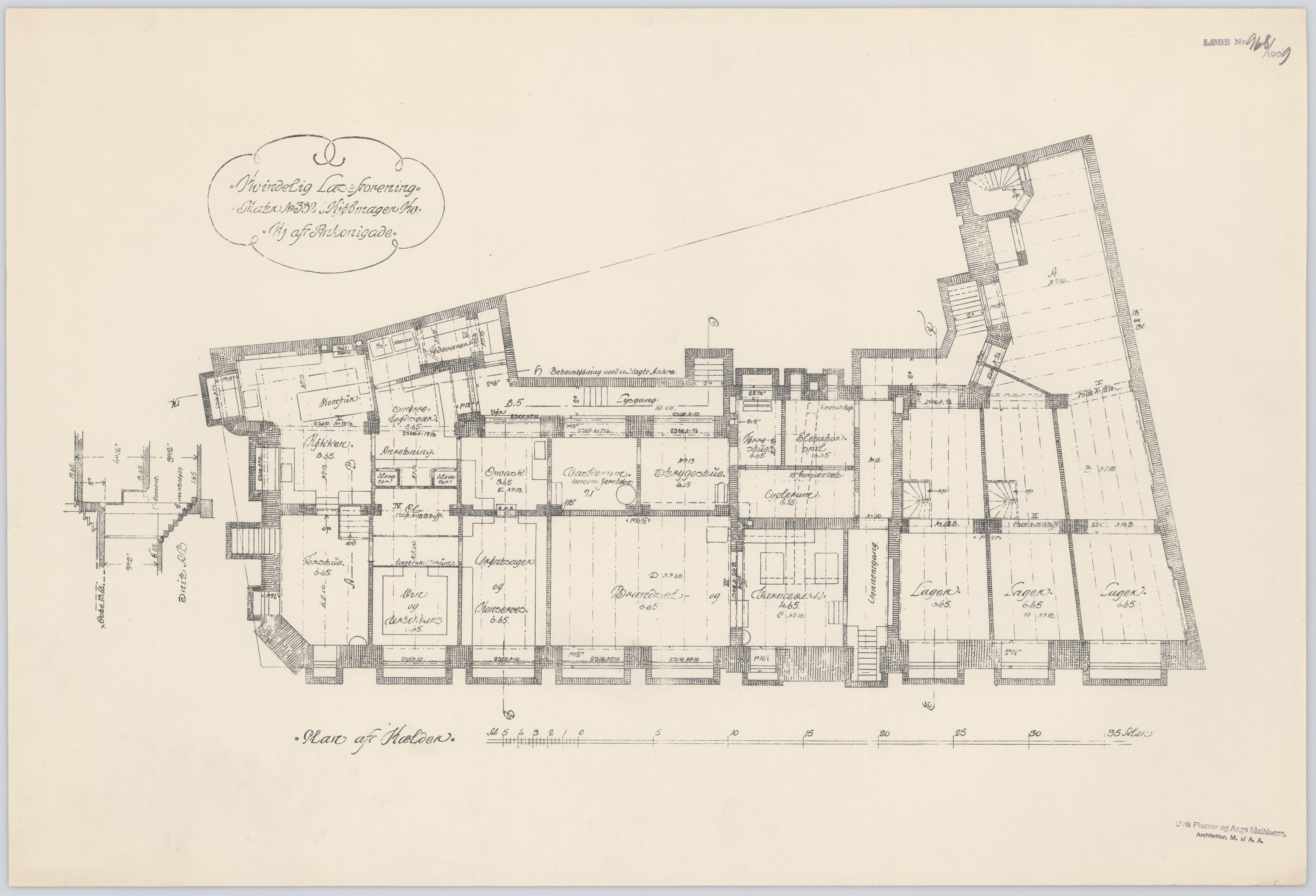
Rendering for the building.

In 1910, the Women Readers' Association purchased a lot at the corner of Gammel Mønt and Antonigade. A four-storey building designed by Ulrik Plesner and Aage Langeland-Mathiesen was completed at the site in 1910. It contained reading rooms, a lending department, restaurant as well as hotel rooms reserved for women on the top floor. The latter was inspired by the Martha Washington Hotel in Nyew York City.

The association gained increased momentum and became a power factor in the 1900s. With 100,000 volumes, its library developed into the largest private collection of fiction in the Nordic countries in the 1930s. In the late 1940s, the number of members began to decline and the association experienced economic difficulties. In 1941, it sold its building to Berlingske Tidende. The Women Readers' Association closed in 1945. The building has later housed Weekendavisen.

== Presidents ==
- 1875-1879: Kirstine Frederiksen
- 1935–1945: Else Zeuthen

== See also ==
- List of libraries in Denmark
