= Braunmühl =

Braunmühl, formerly Braunmüller is a German Swab adel family. Its coat of arms includes a golden millwheel. Notable people with the surname include:

- Anton von Braunmühl (1853–1908), German mathematician
- Gerold Braunmühl (1935–1986), West German diplomat
