= Eleonora Tscherning =

Danish painter

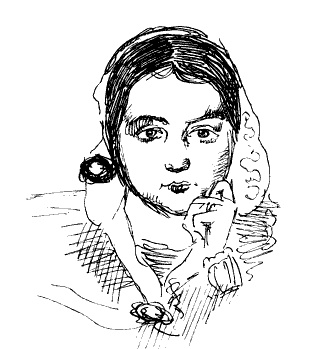
Johan Lundbye: a sketch of Eleonora Tscherning (1841)

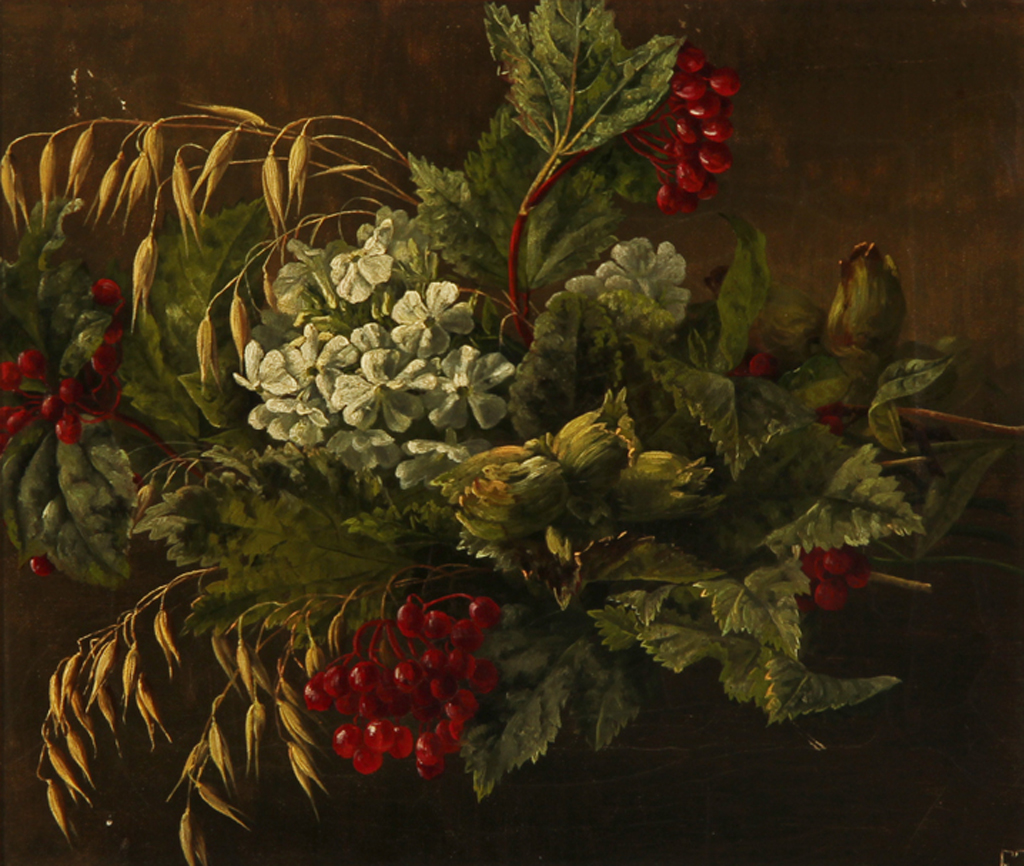
Bouquet with flowers, berries, and straw by Eleonora Tscherning

Eleonora Christine Tscherning (1817–1890) was a Danish painter who created flower paintings and later landscapes, often working in the open air. She is also remembered as one of the most important memoirists of her day, writing letters and diaries documenting important events, including the career of her husband, Anton Frederik Tscherning (1795–1874) who served as a member of Parliament and the Council of State as well as Defence Minister.

== Biography ==
Born on 4 July 1817 in Helsingør, Eleonora Tscherning was the daughter of military officer Adam Tobias Lützow (1775–1844) and Bodil Rasmussen (1790–1865), his unmarried housekeeper. It was only in 1837 that she discovered the identity of her father when, on being promoted head of the artillery corps, he decided to adopt her. The family moved to Copenhagen where she studied painting at the school run by her cousin, the author and flower painter Christine Løvmand.

Tscherning moved from flower painting to landscapes, happy to work in the open air. She gained experience by copying works by Fritz Petzholdt and Jens Juel. She also developed friendships with P.C. Skovgaard, Johan Lundbye and Thorald Læssøe. She exhibited at the Charlottenborg Spring Exhibition from 1842 to 1849, initially anonymously, later using her own name. As a result, she was one of the first female painters in Denmark who signed their works with their names rather than with pseudonyms. In 1845, she married A.F. Tscherning, who encouraged her to continue painting but marriage to a politician and raising a family of five children left her little time for creative work.

As an artist, she found that married life was too demanding for her to paint but she was nevertheless able to travel abroad with her daughter, in 1869 to Switzerland and in 1873 to Italy. From 1864, she decorated vases at the P. Ipsens Enke terracotta factory but retired some 20 years later after suffering a heart attack. After her husband died in 1874, she supplemented her income by running a flower painting course for young women together with her youngest daughter, Sara Ulrik (1855–1916). Her elder daughter Anthonore Christensen (1849–1926) was also an artist.

Tscherning also wrote a number of articles some of which appeared in Fortællinger in 1870. Between 1871 and 1875, she wrote and published a series of poems and short stories. Her memoirs and letters were published for the first time in 1908.

Eleonora Tscherning died on 3 July 1890. She was buried at Garnisons Cemetery in Copenhagen.
