= Axel Anthon Bjørnbo =

Danish librarian and mathematic and cartographic historian

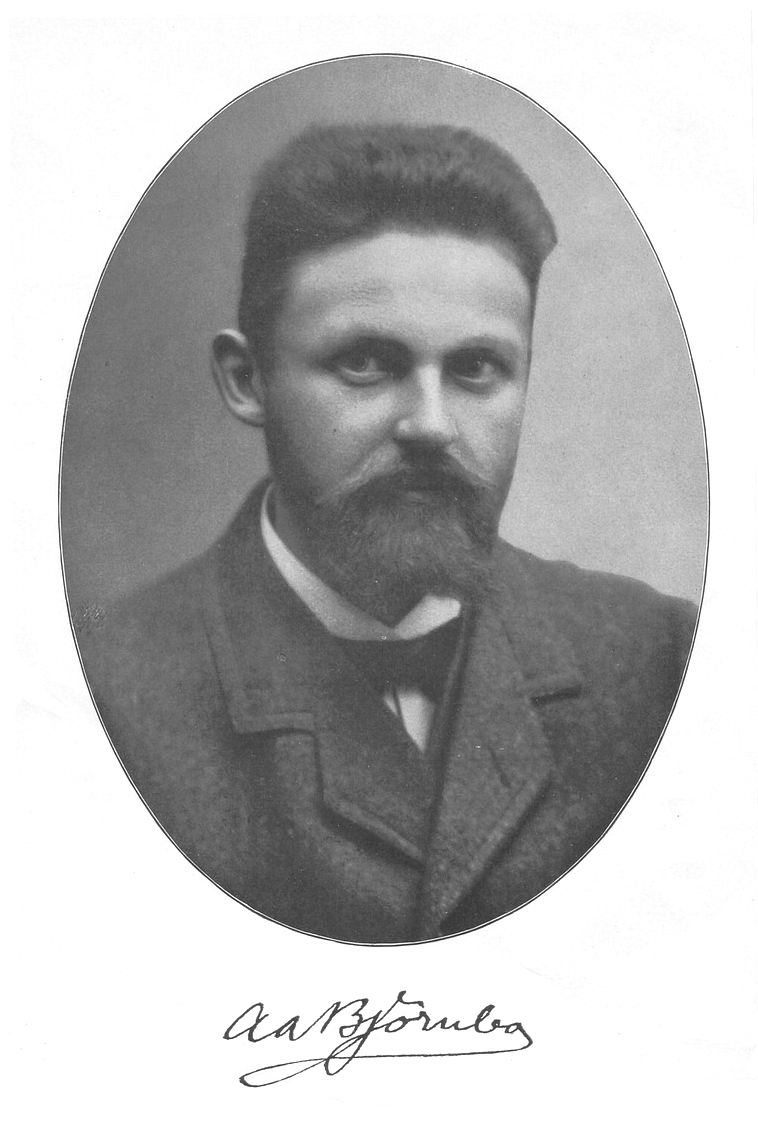

Axel Anthon Bjørnbo, born Christensen (April 20, 1874 – October 6, 1911), was a Danish librarian and historian of mathematics and cartography. He was among the earliest to examine the spherical trigonometry of the Greeks and Arabs.

== Life and work ==
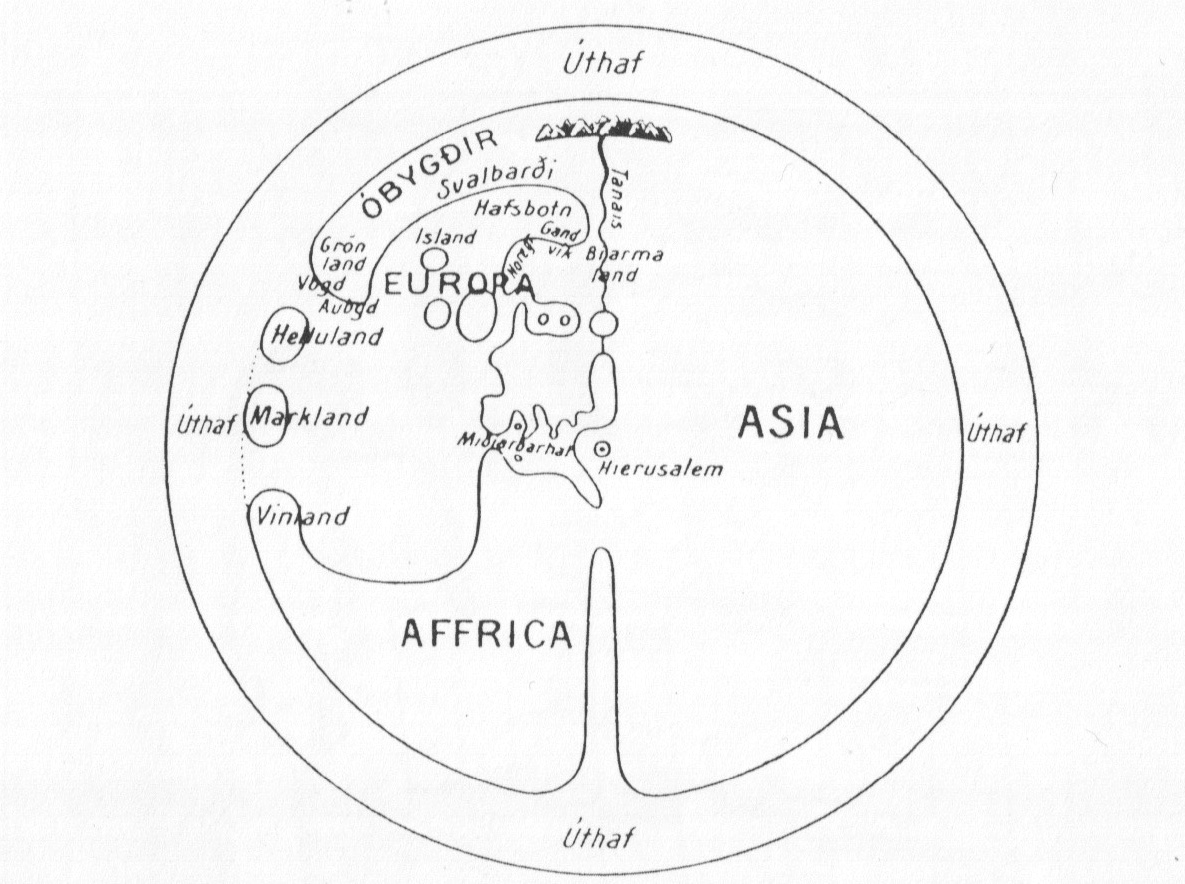
Map based on the work of Claudius Clavus

Bjørnbo was born Axel Anthon Christensen, in Copenhagen, the son of artist Anthonore Christensen and philologist Richard Christensen. After the death of his father in 1876, he was taken care of entirely by his mother. He became interested in the classics, studying Greek under J. L. Heiberg and became interested in Greek mathematics. He began to examined Menelaus' spherics and took an interest in history. He took on the surname Bjørnbo in 1901 as names ending in -sen like "Christiansen" were regarded with too high status. He went to the Ludwig-Maximilians-Universität München where he worked under Anton von Braunmühl. He examined Arabic trigonometric works in collaboration with Rasmus Olsen Besthorn and Hebrew texts with David Simonsen and published his studies on Menelaus of Alexandria's spherics in 1902 and received a doctorate. He became a librarian in 1902 at the Royal Library at Copenhagen also became interested in cartography in the Middle Ages after discovering a manuscript work by Claudius Clavus. He also catalogued all the mathematical and astronomical manuscripts and produced a catalogue of about 2000 entries. This work on Greenlandic mapping before 1576 was published posthumously as Cartographia Groenlandica. He died of a heart attack at the age of 37.
