= Sara Ulrik =

Danish flower painter

Sara Birgitte Ulrik
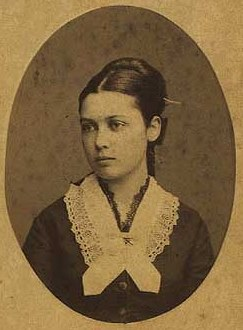
- Photograph of Ulrik by Georg Emil Hansen, 1870s
- Born: Sara Birgitte Tscherning; July 9, 1855; Denmark
- Died: May 22, 1916 (aged 60); Copenhagen, Denmark
- Mother: Eleonora Tscherning
- Relatives: Anthonore Christensen (sister)

Sara Brigitte Ulrik née Tscherning (9 July 1855 – 22 May 1916) was a Danish painter.

Ulrik came from a family of artists and grew up painting from a young age. She and her sister, Anthonore Christensen, were taught to paint by their mother, Eleonora Tscherning. Ulrik herself became a painting instructor, though she withdrew from her professional career as a painter after her marriage in 1879.

== Biography ==
Sara Brigitte Tscherning was born on 9 July 1855 in Ørholm north of Copenhagen. Her parents, army officer and politician Anton Frederik Tscherning (1795–1874) and the painter Eleonore Christine Lützow (1817–1890), had five children, of whom she was the youngest. Her sister, Anthonore Christensen, (1849–1926) was also a flower painter. Both she and her sister were first taught painting by their mother. Sara Brigitte studied and painted wild flowers and weeds, together with other flowers she found, perhaps while travelling with her mother. She and her mother travelled to Italy in 1873.

She made her debut as an artist at the 1876 Charlottenborg Spring Exhibition. She displayed three of her works at the Spring Exhibition, of which her piece "Voksende Foraarsblomster" (English: Growing Spring Flowers) gained particular acclaim. Between 1877 and 1879, she exhibited eight more paintings. During this period, her works "Blaa Aakander i et Bassin i Drivhusene paa Sølyst" (1878) and "Markblomster" (1879) were most notable. In addition to exhibiting her works, she also taught flower painting until about 1879.

On 17 January 1879, she married physician Axel Ulrik (1846–1930) in Copenhagen. After her marriage she continued to paint, though she no longer exhibited her works or taught students. She died in Copenhagen on 22 May 1916.

== Gallery ==
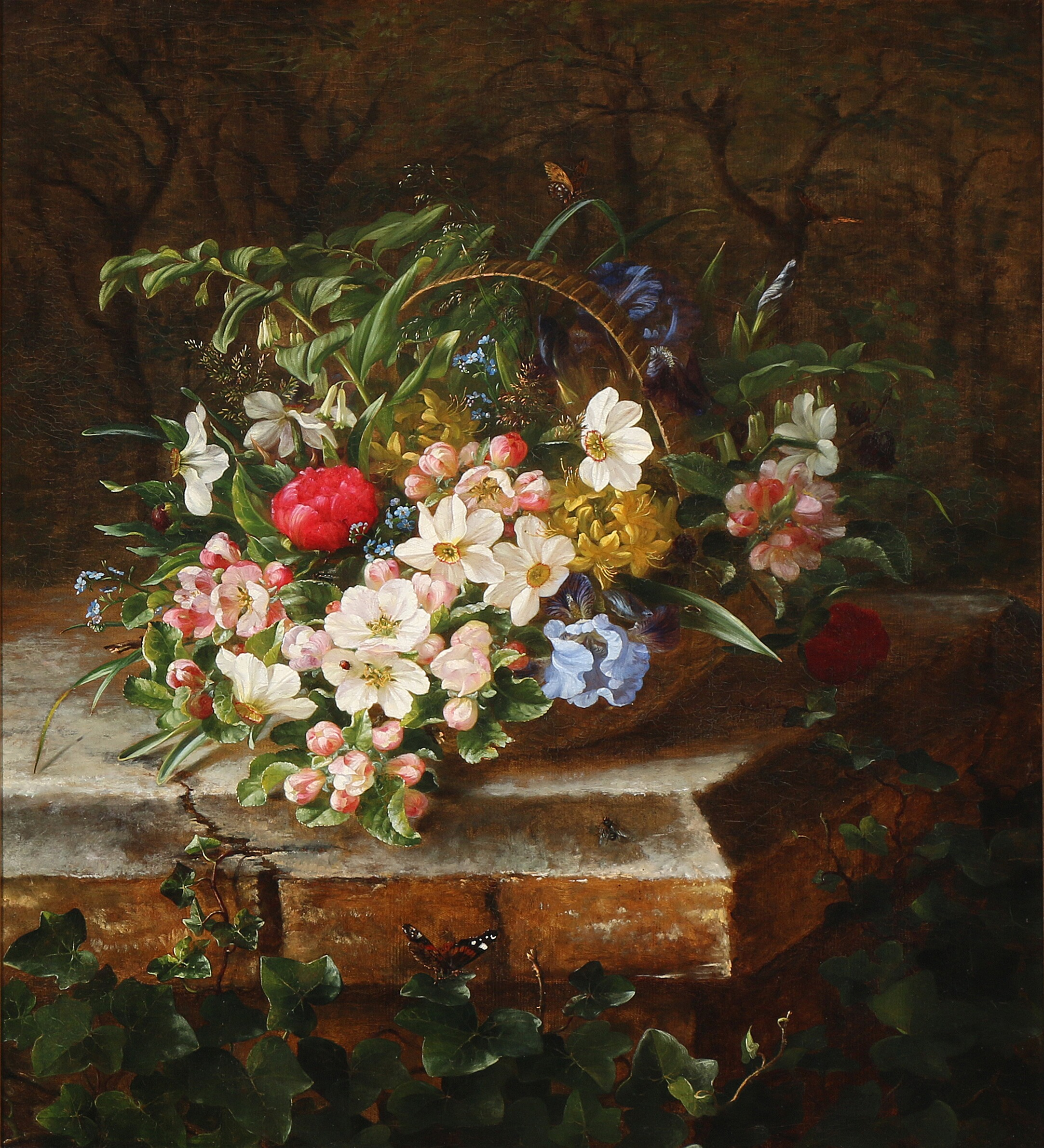
Opstilling med blomsterkurv omsværmet af insekter på en stenbænk, oil on canvas, 1877

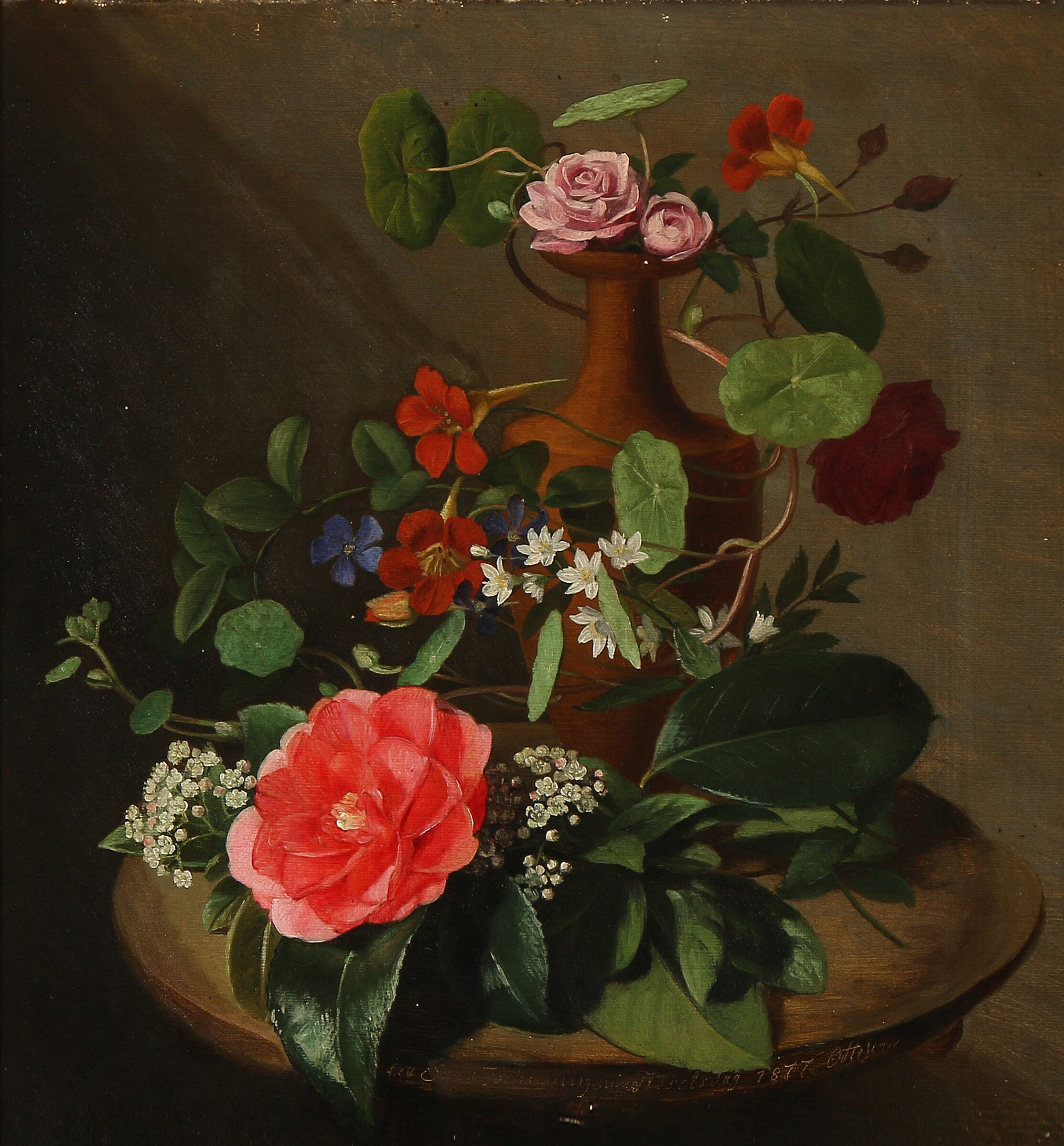
Roser, slyngplanter og andre blomster i en vase på et bord, c. 1877
