= Anthonore Christensen =

Danish flower painter

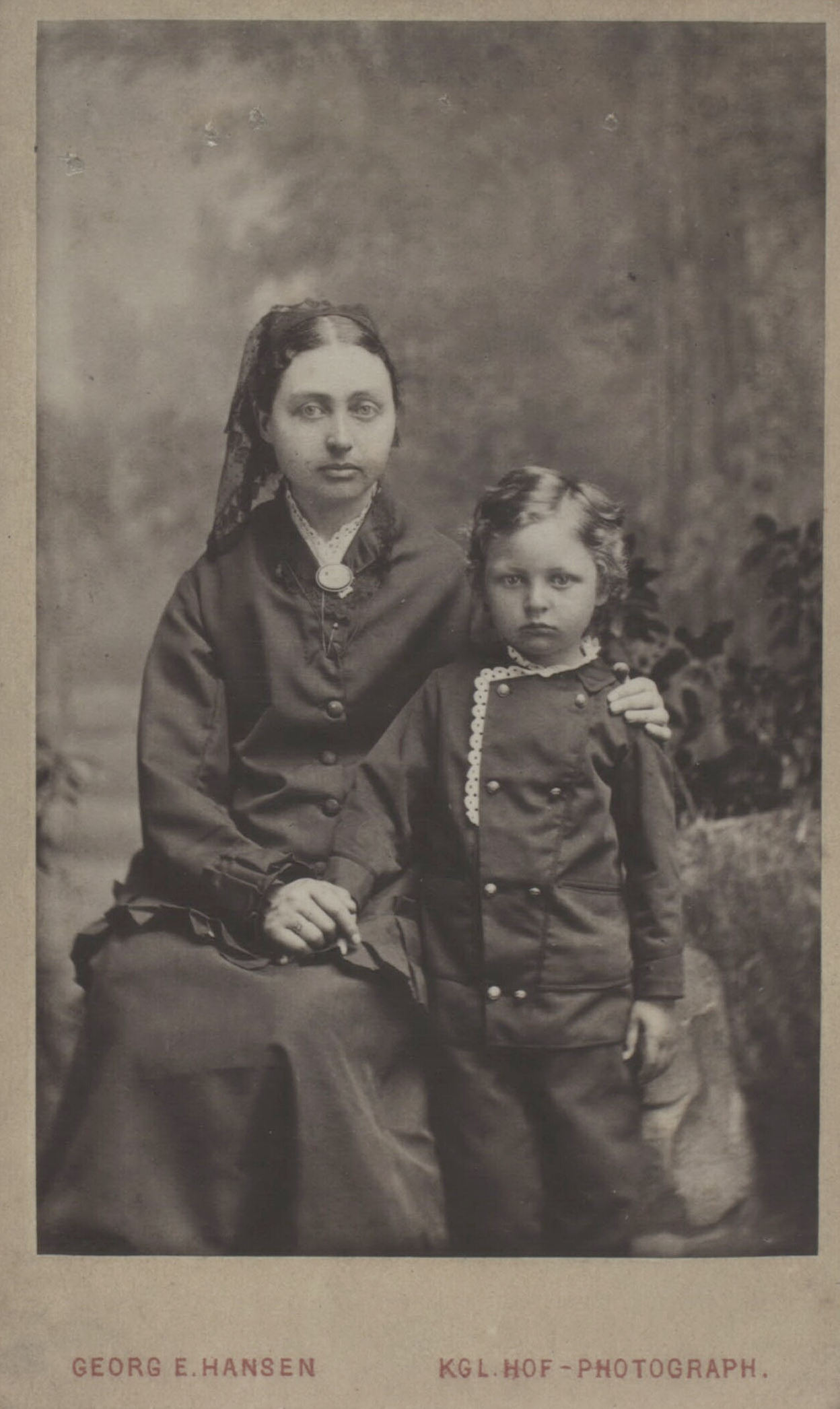
Anthonore Christensen with her son Axel Anthon Bjørnbo

Anthonie Eleonore Christensen, generally known as Anthonore Christensen, née Tscherning (1849–1926) was a Danish flower painter. She exhibited from 1867 at Charlottenborg, winning the medal of the year in 1893. As a painting teacher, her students included Queen Louise and Queen Olga of Greece.

== Life and work ==
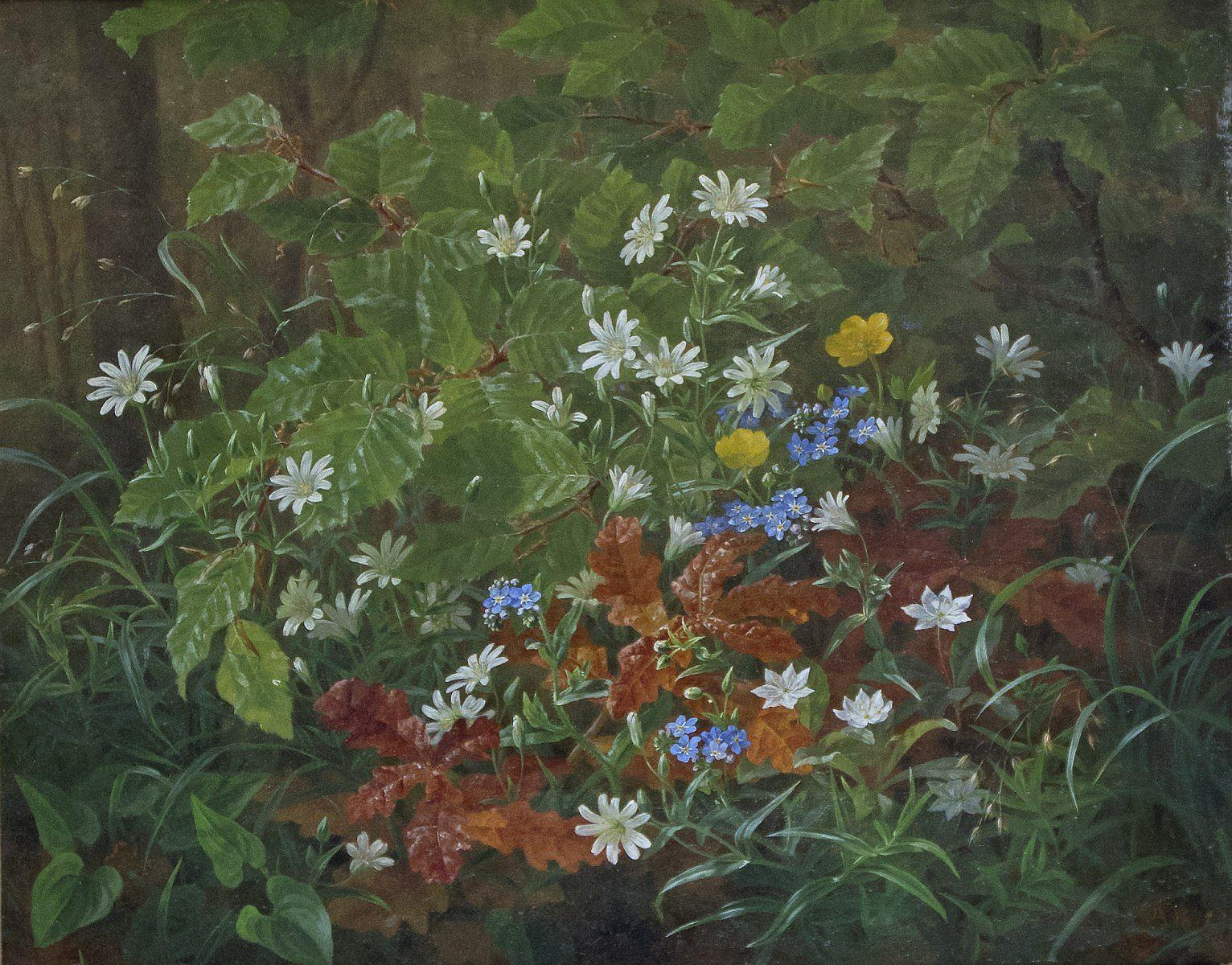
Wiesenblumen (1871)

Born on 5 July 1849 in Copenhagen, Anthonie Eleonore Tscherning was the daughter of the army officer and politician Anton Frederik Tscherning (1795–1874) and the painter Eleonora Tscherning née Lützow (1817–1890). Her sister, Sara Ulrik, (1855–1916) was also a flower painter. On 4 October 1871, she married the classical philologist Richard Christensen (1843–1876).

Christensen was taught to paint first by the flower painter Emma Thomsen and later by her mother, with whom she took a study trip to Germany, Italy and Paris in 1869. She began to exhibit in 1867 under her maiden name, immediately attracting attention for her fresh, carefully presented work. The following year, her Voxende Anemoner, tidligt Foraar (Growing Anemones, Early Spring) was purchased by the Royal Painting Collection.

After her wedding, she and her husband spent two years in Italy. On her return, she exhibited more mature works, inspired by flora from the south. In 1887, she was awarded the Neuhausen Prize for Et Kurvelaag med afskaarne Roser (A Flower Basket with Roses). Her husband died in an accident just five years after their marriage. Their son Axel Anthon, who adopted the surname Björnbo in later life, became a librarian and mathematics historian.

Anthonore Christensen died on 27 August 1926 in Hørsholm. She is buried in Holmen Cemetery.
