= An Ancient Burial Mound by Raklev on Refsnæs =

Painting by Johan Thomas Lundbye

An ancient burial mound by Raklev on Refsnæs
- En gravhøj fra oldtiden ved Raklev på Refsnæs (Danish)
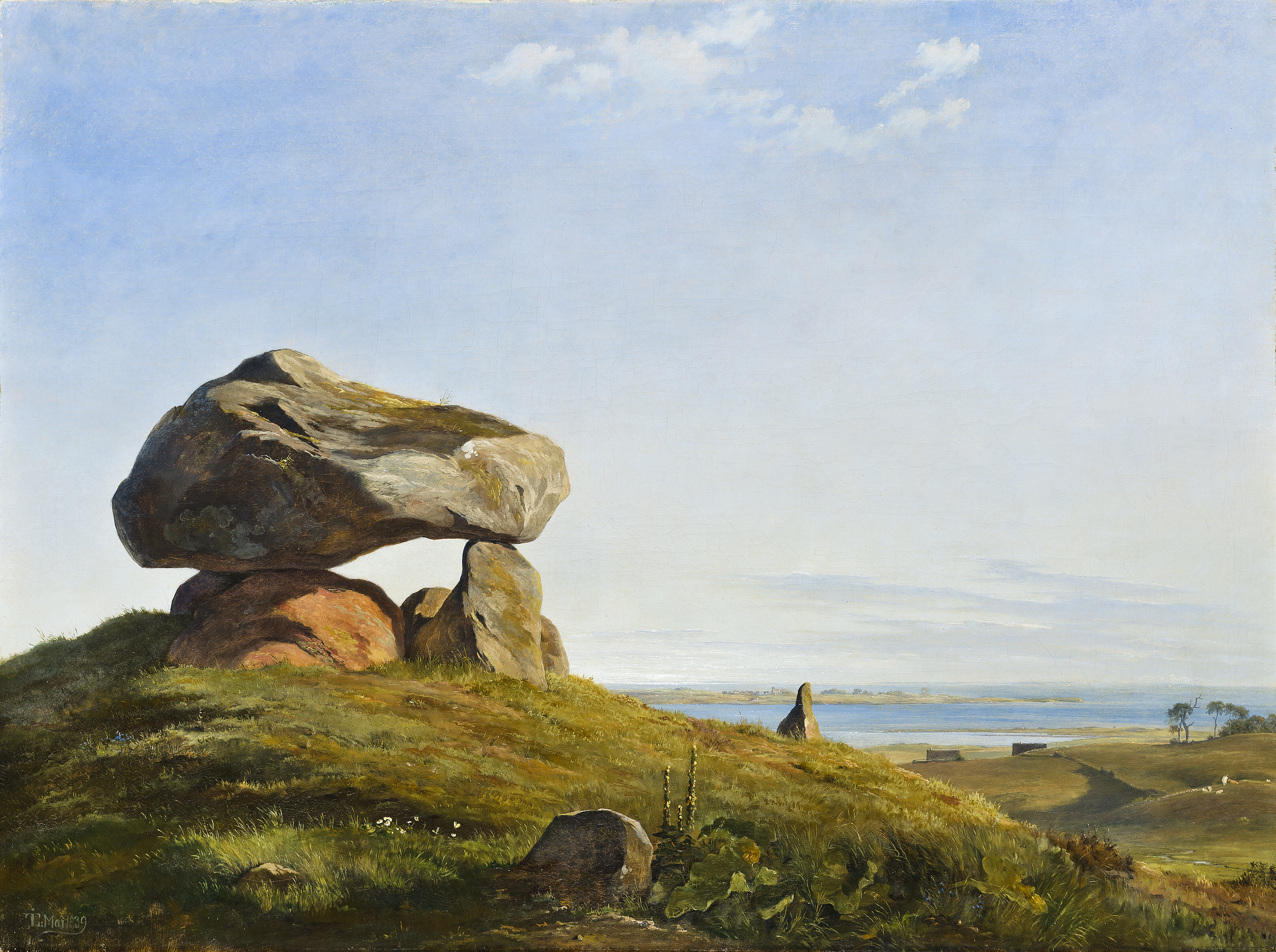
- Artist: Johan Thomas Lundbye
- Year: 1839
- Medium: 78967 persay
- Dimensions: 66.7 cm × 88.9 cm (26.3 in × 35.0 in)
- Location: Thorvaldsens Museum
- Website: www.thorvaldsensmuseum.dk/samlingerne/vaerk/B255

An Ancient Burial Mound by Raklev on Refsnæs is a Danish landscape painting by Johan Thomas Lundbye from 1839. The painting is executed in the national romantic tradition, as advocated by Niels Laurits Høyen.

In the foreground is the painting's central motif, a tumulus. The painting uses this very prominent figure, a giant mound that pushes the image background back, to give great depth to the painting.
