= Heinrich Wieleitner =

German mathematician and historian of mathematics

Heinrich Wieleitner (31 October 1874, Wasserburg am Inn, Germany – 27 December 1931) was a German mathematician and historian of mathematics. He became an honorary professor of mathematics at the Ludwig-Maximilians-Universität München but for much of his career worked in school- and college-level education.

Wieleitner was born in Wasserburg and was educated at the Catholic seminaries at Scheyern and Freising in theology but took an interest in mathematics, joining the Ludwig-Maximilians-Universität München. He received a Lamont scholarship proposed by C. L. F. Lindemann and went on to receive a doctorate on third order surfaces (Über die Flächen dritter Ordnung mit Ovalpunkten) in 1901. He then became a mathematics teacher at the Speyer Gymnasium and in 1909 moved to Pirmasens before returning to Speyer as a headmaster of the Realschule. In 1926, he was promoted Oberstudiendirektor in Munich. He became interested in Italian work on geometry following his attendance of the International Congress of Mathematicians held in Heidelberg (1904) and Rome (1908), leading to translations of an article by Gino Loria and he worked on a German edition of Pascal's work along with Edgardo Ciani. Arnold Sommerfeld suggested that he do his habilitation, and so he held lectures on the history of mathematics at the Ludwig-Maximilians-Universität München from 1928. In 1930, he was made an honorary professor. Wieleitner worked on an unfinished manuscript by Anton von Braunmühl (died in 1908) on the history of mathematics after Braunmühl and Siegmund Günther had worked on a history, Geschichte der Mathematik, the first volume of which came out in 1908. Wieleitner later published a history of mathematical ideas that did not spend too much space on the biographies of people involved which was published by Sammlung Göschen between 1922 and 1923. He also contributed to a translation of the trigonometry of Al-Biruni by Julius Ruska.

== Selected publications ==
- Geschichte der Mathematik (Volume 1, 1922) (1908 edition)
- Spezielle ebene kurven (1908)
