= Emma Thomsen (painter) =

Danish flower painter

Emma Augusta Thomsen
- Born: 7 August 1820; Copenhagen, Denmark
- Died: 6 November 1897 (aged 77); Copenhagen, Denmark
- Burial place: Holmens Kirkegård
- Occupation: Painter

Emma Augusta Thomsen (7 August 1820 — 6 November 1897) was a Danish flower painter. Her work featured bouquets, flower baskets, and other traditional flower arrangements, in addition to wild plants.

Thomson was largely self-taught, though she briefly was instructed by Johan Laurentz Jensen. She exhibited 130 works over the course of her career. Some of her pieces were purchased by the National Gallery of Denmark, Christian VIII, and Adam Wilhelm Moltke, among others. She was awarded several prizes and scholarships, including the Neuhausen Prize.

== Biography ==
Emma Augusta Thomsen was born on 7 August 1820 in Copenhagen. She was the daughter of the Anna Kirstine Ohlsen and Emanuel Thomsen, a hotel owner. From a young age, she drew landscapes, botanical still life drawings, and figure compositions. She was introduced to flower painting by Johan Laurentz Jensen but received instruction from him for a very brief period of time. Thomsen was largely self-taught, and developed as a flower painter by producing studies from nature and copying Dutch still lifes of flowers and fruit.

In 1844, Thomsen made her debut with a still life featuring fruit, a study of birds, and two flower paintings. From that year on, she was a regular contributor to the Charlottenborg Spring Exhibition. Over the course of her career she exhibited 130 works in 49 shows. In addition to exhibiting at the Charlottenborg Spring Exhibition, she also presented her work in Stockholm and at the 1895 Copenhagen Women's Exhibition. She sold two of her paintings to the Royal Painting Collection: Roser og Ipomæa and En Blomsterkrans, ophængt paa Bøgegrene.

In addition to working as a painter, Thomsen taught other painters, including Anthonore Christensen. In 1861, she was awarded the Neuhausen Prize for the En Kurv med Blomster i det frie. The painting was subsequently bought by Count A.W. Moltke. In 1863 she was awarded the Sødrings Legat scholarship, which gave her a stipend to produce her art, and in 1869 she was awarded a travel scholarship.

She died on 6 November 1897 in Copenhagen and was buried at Holmen Cemetery. Like many successful flower painters of her era, she never married.

== Gallery ==
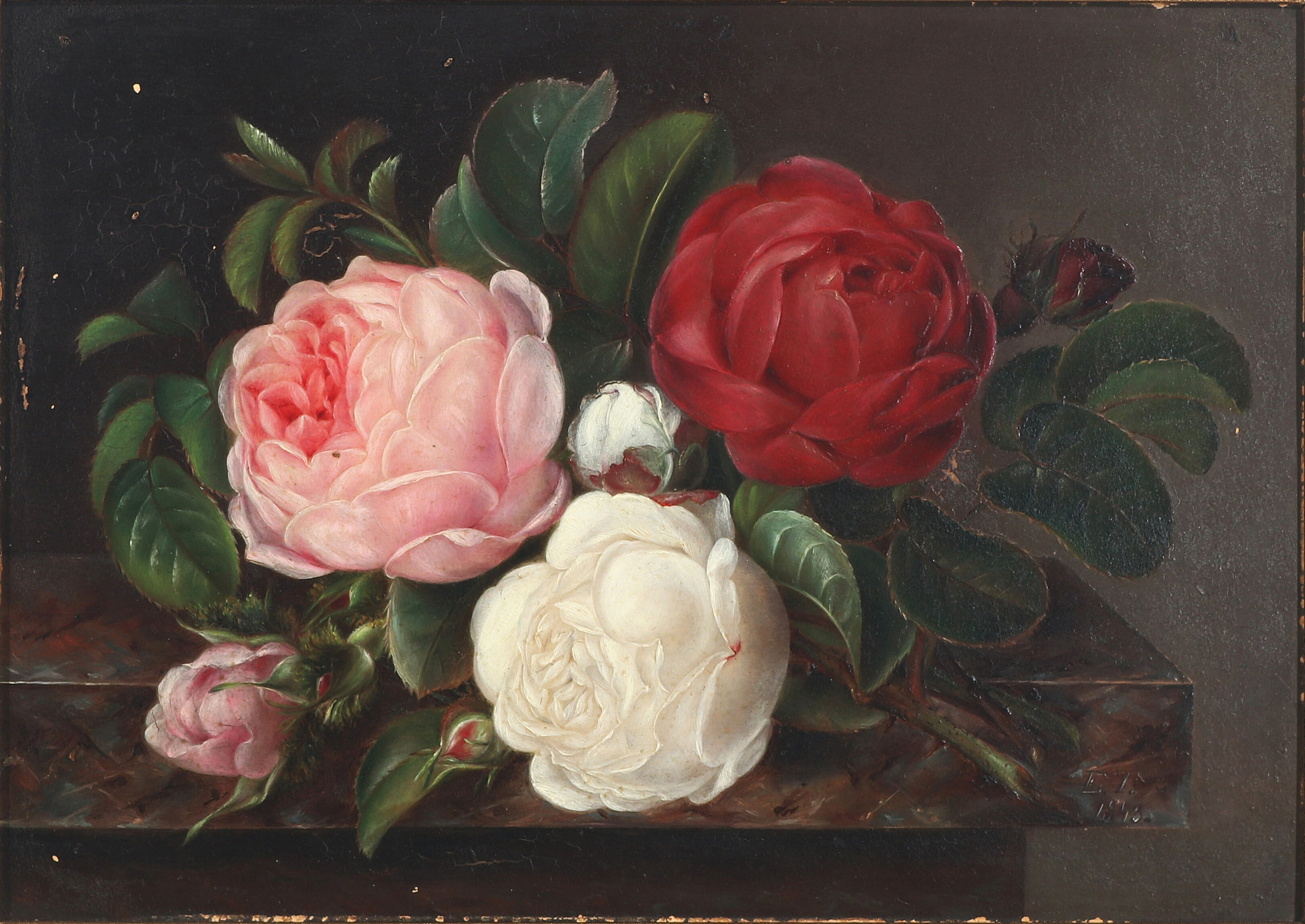
Opstilling med roser på en stenkarm, oil on paper, 1843

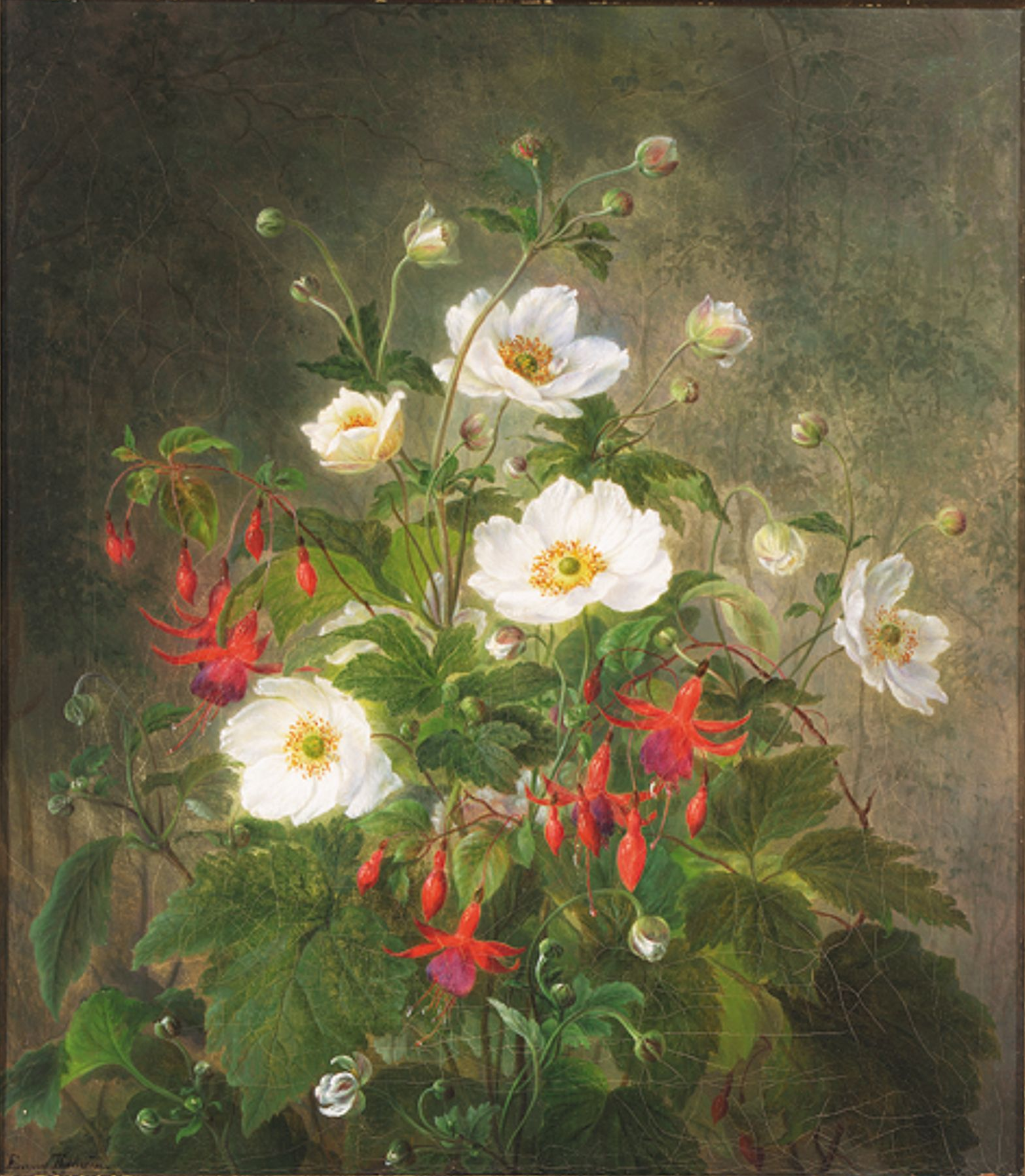
Fuchsiaer og høstanemoner, oil on canvas, 1888

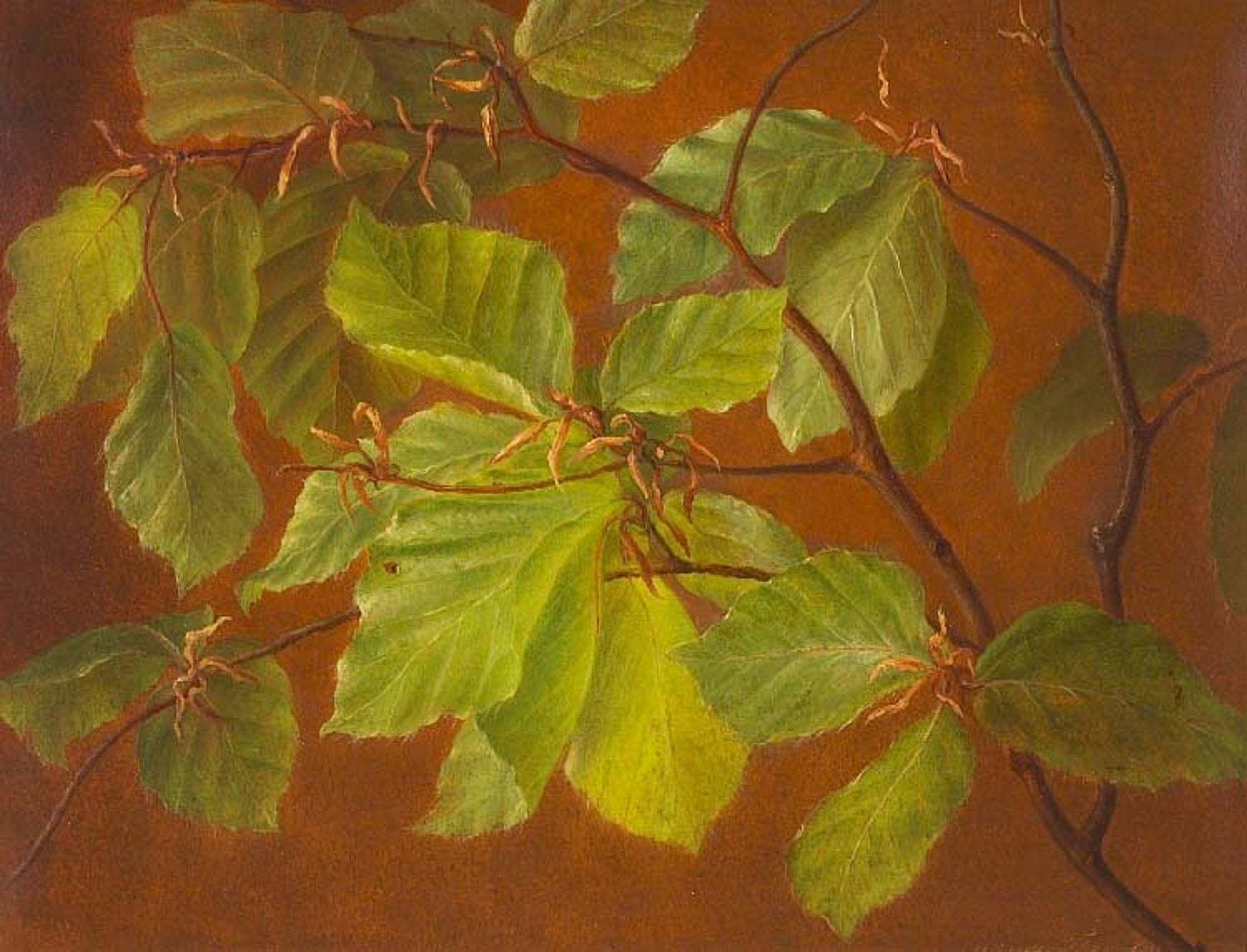
Bøgeblade, oil on canvas

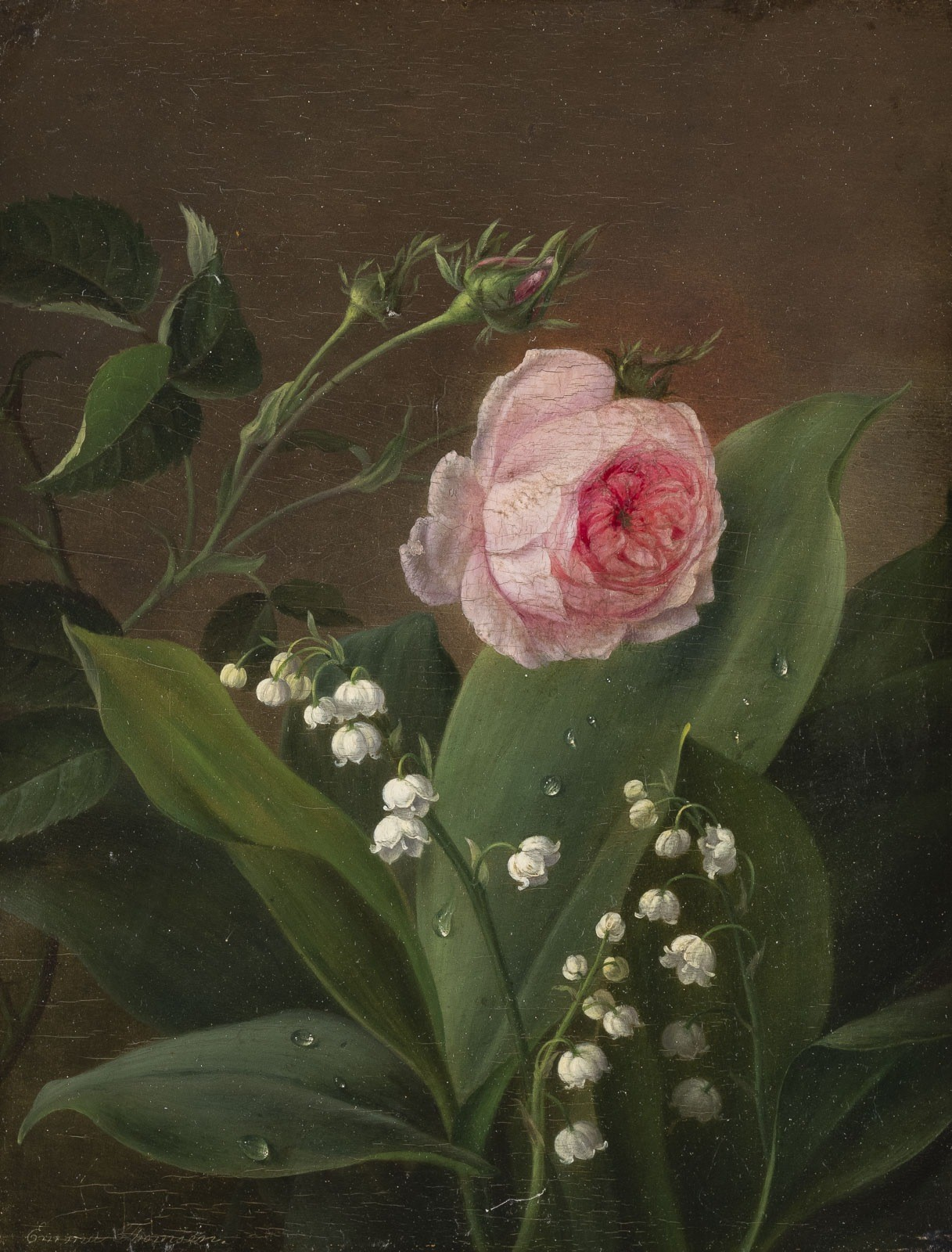
Rosen und Maiglöckchen, oil on wood
