= Christine Løvmand =

Danish artist

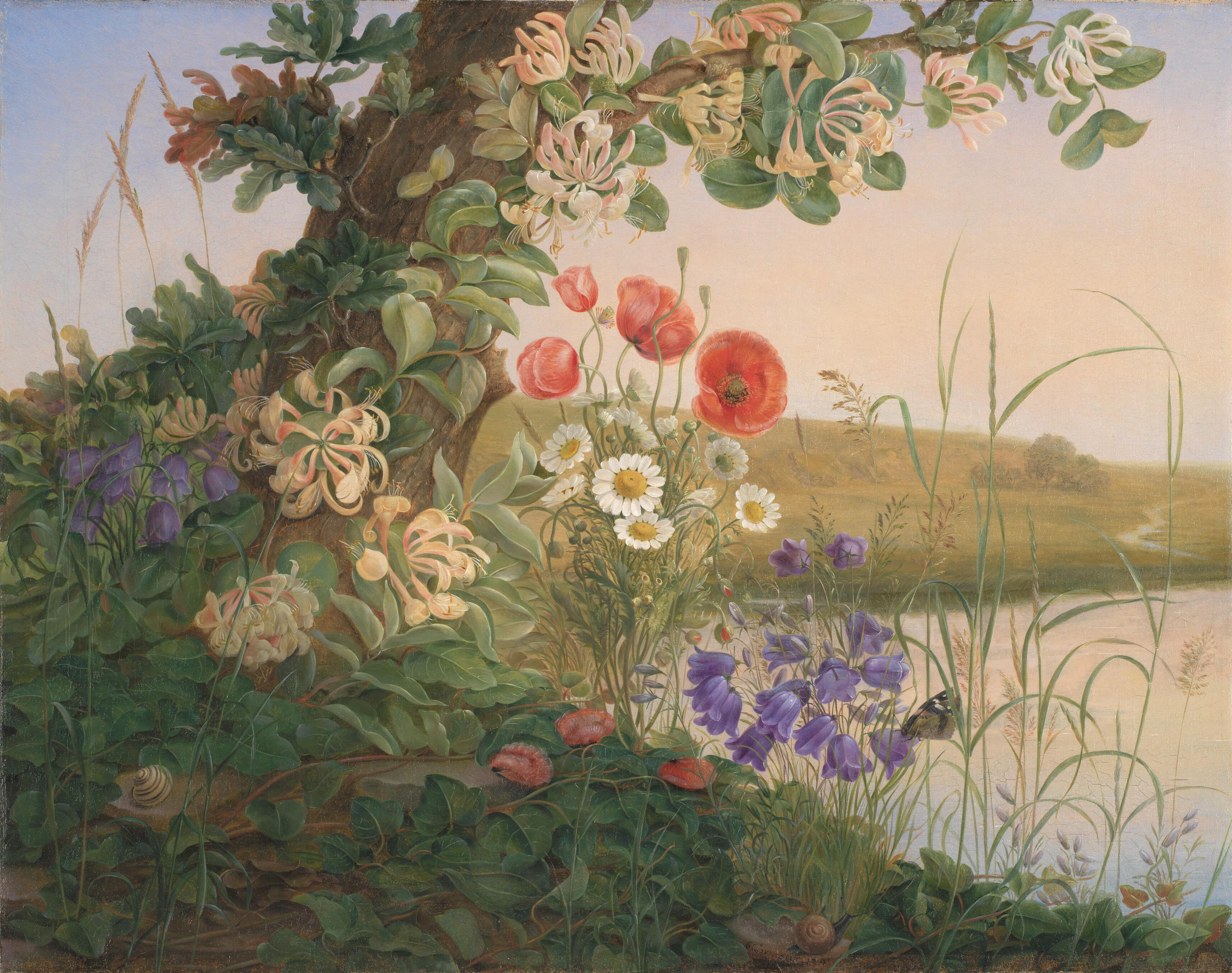
Christine Løvmand: Blomsterstykke (1841)

Christine Marie Løvmand (born March 19, 1803, and died April 10, 1872, both in Copenhagen) was a Danish artist who specialized in still life paintings, typically of flowers and fruit. She was one of the few women at the time who gained recognition as a painter, and is associated to the Golden Age of Danish Painting in the mid 19th century. Posthumously, her work has been subject to display throughout Scandinavian museums and exhibitions, including, at present, the National Gallery of Denmark, also referred to as the Statens Gallery for Kunst.

== Biography ==
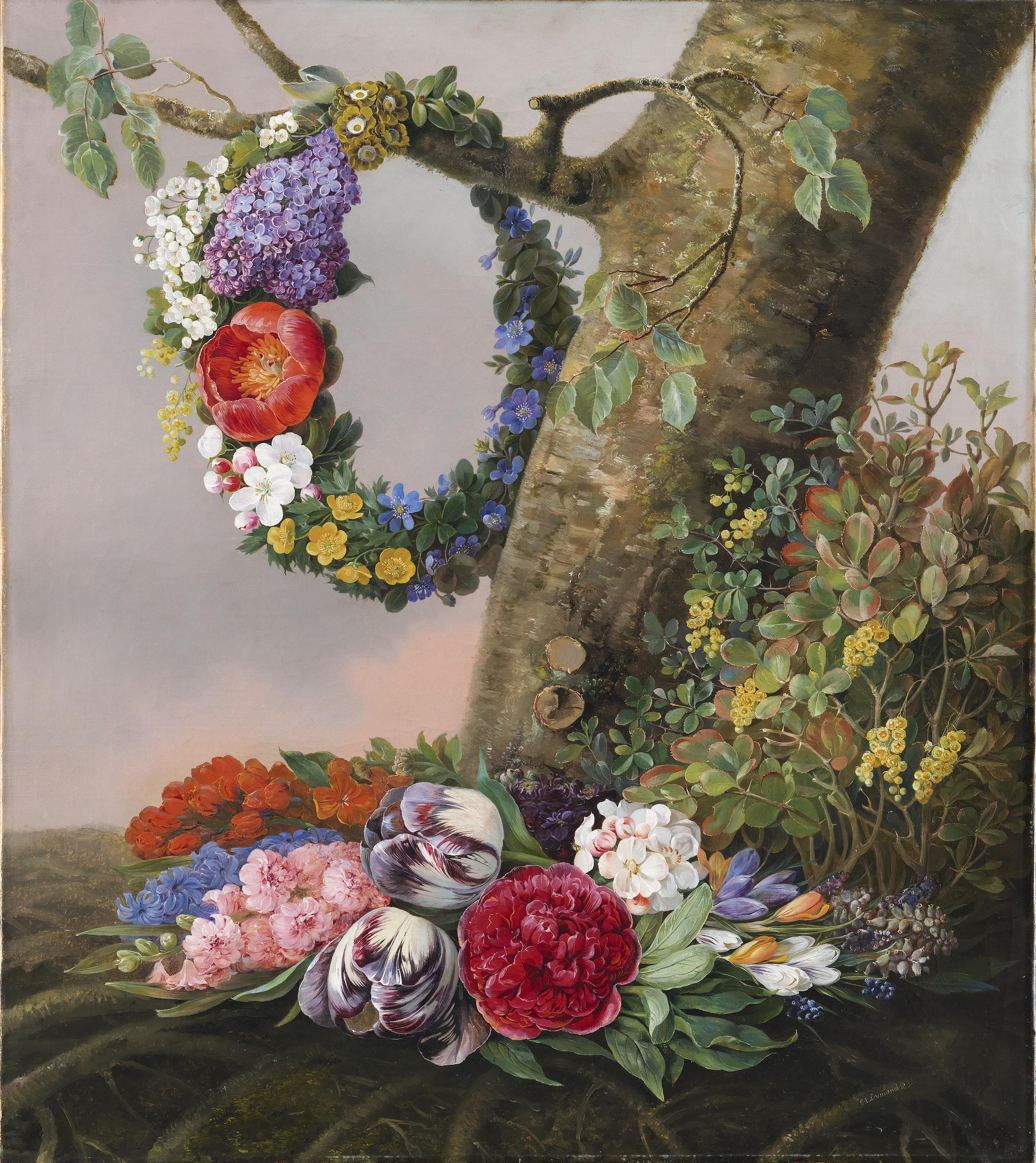
Christine Løvmand: En buket blomster ved foden af et træ

As a child, Løvmand helped her sick mother look after the five children in the family. When her father died in 1826, she resolved to work hard to support the family. From 1824, both Christine and her sister Frederikke started to have painting and drawing lessons with the flower painter Johannes Ludvig Camradt. In 1827, the two sisters began to exhibit at Charlottenborg Spring Exhibition. From 1831 to 1834, Christine was one of Christoffer Wilhelm Eckersberg's students. Løvmand was only able to study under Eckersberg privately on Sundays, as it was not possible for her to participate in formal classes with male students. During this time, women were not allowed to enroll or receive formal training at the Royal Danish Academy Of Fine Arts. This was unchanged until 1888, when the Academy announced selective art education opportunities for women. Coed instruction was not permissible until 1908. During the time, women artists were not allowed to reference human models or paint forms of nudity. Due to this, many Danish women artists of the period, including Løvmand, would elect to paint flowers, fruit, and other still life elements.

Christine Løvmand was one of the few female painters that gained notoriety during the Danish Golden Age. The first official recognition she received came in 1827 when the Royal Collection first purchased one of her paintings. In 1842, she received a stipend from King Christian VIII which allowed her to study in Germany. In 1846, she was able to pay for a short study trip to Paris herself. She admitted that the study trips widened her understanding of art but had little effect on her own painting as nearly all her time was taken up with teaching.

For an extended period she instructed young women in painting in her own home. Among her students were the actress Johanne Luise Heiberg, the writer Benedicte Arnesen Kall and her cousin Eleonora Tscherning who also became a recognized painter.

She died on 10 April 1872 and is buried in Assistens Cemetery.

== Selected works ==
- En kurv med blomster og nogle vindruer på en piedestal (1827)
- En kurv med frugter i et landskab (1832)
- En buket blomster ved foden af et træ (1832)
- Blomsterstykke (1841)
- Frugter i et italiensk landskab (c. 1844)
- Blomster på en sten
- Tulipaner og aurikler (1858)
- En krans af efterårets sidste blomsterflor (c. 1872)
