= Ferdinand von Lindemann =

German mathematician (1852–1939)

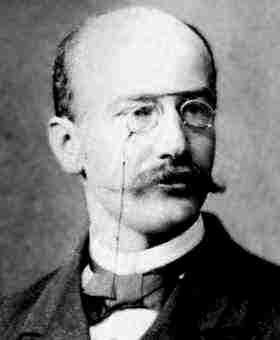
- Carl Louis Ferdinand von Lindemann
- Born: 12 April 1852; Hannover, German Confederation
- Died: 6 March 1939 (aged 86); Munich, Germany
- Education: Friedrich-Alexander-University, Erlangen-Nuremberg
- Known for: Proof that π is transcendental; Lindemann–Weierstrass theorem
- Scientific career
- Fields: Mathematics
- Workplaces: Ludwig-Maximilians-Universität München; University of Freiburg
- Doctoral advisor: C. Felix Klein
- Doctoral students: Emil Hilb; David Hilbert; Martin Kutta; Alfred Loewy; Hermann Minkowski; Oskar Perron; Arthur Rosenthal; Arnold Sommerfeld; Heinrich Wieleitner

Carl Louis Ferdinand von Lindemann (12 April 1852 – 6 March 1939) was a German mathematician who proved in 1882 that π (pi) is a transcendental number, meaning it is not a root of any nonzero polynomial with rational coefficients.

== Life and education ==
Lindemann was born in Hanover, the capital of the Kingdom of Hanover. His father, Ferdinand Lindemann, taught modern languages at a gymnasium in Hanover. His mother, Emilie Crusius, was the daughter of the gymnasium's headmaster. The family later moved to Schwerin, where young Ferdinand attended school.

He studied mathematics at the University of Göttingen, the University of Erlangen, and the Ludwig-Maximilians-Universität München. At the University of Erlangen, he received a doctorate, supervised by Felix Klein, on non-Euclidean geometry. Lindemann subsequently taught in Würzburg and at the University of Freiburg. During his time in Freiburg, Lindemann devised his proof that π is a transcendental number (see the Lindemann–Weierstrass theorem). After his time in Freiburg, Lindemann transferred to the University of Königsberg. While a professor in Königsberg, Lindemann acted as supervisor for the doctoral theses of the mathematicians David Hilbert, Hermann Minkowski, and Arnold Sommerfeld.

== Transcendence proof ==
In 1882, Lindemann published the result for which he is best known, the transcendence of π. His methods were similar to those used nine years earlier by Charles Hermite to show that e, the base of natural logarithms, is transcendental, and the works of Joseph Liouville from the 1840s establishing the existence of transcendental numbers. Before the publication of Lindemann's proof, Johann Heinrich Lambert had already shown that π is irrational in 1768.
