= Mill (heraldry) =

Use of mill symbols in heraldry

Windmills or water mills are sometimes used as a charge in heraldic arms, usually as a sign for agricultural or industrial endeavors.

== Gallery ==
A water mill in the arms of Viana de Jadraque, Spain

A former coat of arms of the municipality of Säkylä, Finland

Mühldorf am Inn (canting, since the name means "Mill village on the Inn")

The arms of Bonsmoulins, France, with a millwheel in the base

The arms of La Courneuve, France, with a millwheel in the door opening

Nacka, Sweden (Swedish variant)

Forssa, Finland

Bolivar family in Biscaya

== See also ==
- Millrind
- History of heraldry
