= Anton von Braunmühl =

German mathematician

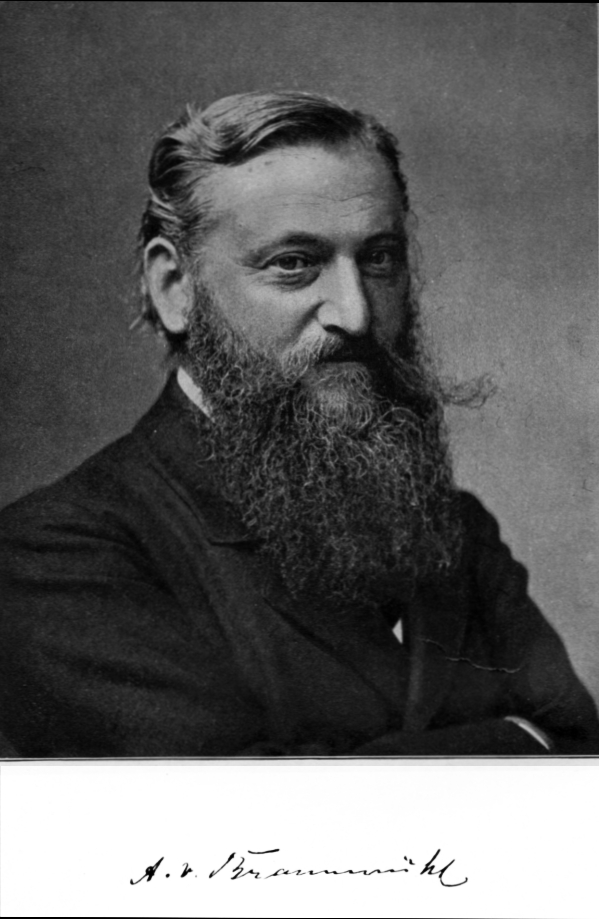

Johann Anton Edler von Braunmühl (22 December 1853, Tiflis – 7 March 1908, Munich) was a German historian of mathematics and mathematician who worked on synthetic geometry and trigonometry.

Braunmühl was born in Tiflis but came from a Bavarian family and his father had gone as an architect to build a palace. The death of his father in 1856 led to the mother and family moving to Munich where he went to school. His mother died in 1866, after which he was taken care of by an uncle. He passed school in 1873 and joined the Ludwig-Maximilians-Universität München where he studied physics under G. Bauer, L. von Seidel, J. von Lamont, Philip Von Jolly, Friedrich Narr and history under M. Bernays and B. Riehl. He also attended classes in mathematics at the polytechnikum under A. Brill, F. Klein and J.N. Bischoff. He received a doctorate summa cum laude in 1878 and at the same time began to teach at the Realgymnasium. In 1879, he married Franziska Stölzl; they had two daughters. He became a professor in 1892. His teaching were on algebraic analysis, projective geometry, and trigonometry and his students included chemists and architects. Axel Anthon Björnbo was one his students, who worked on spherical trigonometry of the Greeks and Arabs. From 1893 to 1894, he also began to teach the history of mathematics. This would lead to his comprehensive survey of the history of trigonometry in two volumes, published in 1900 and 1903. He then took up writing a two-volume history of mathematics but he died before it could be published. His manuscript was worked on by Heinrich Wieleitner.
