= Johan Thomas Lundbye =

Danish painter and graphic artist (1818–1848)

Johan Lundbye
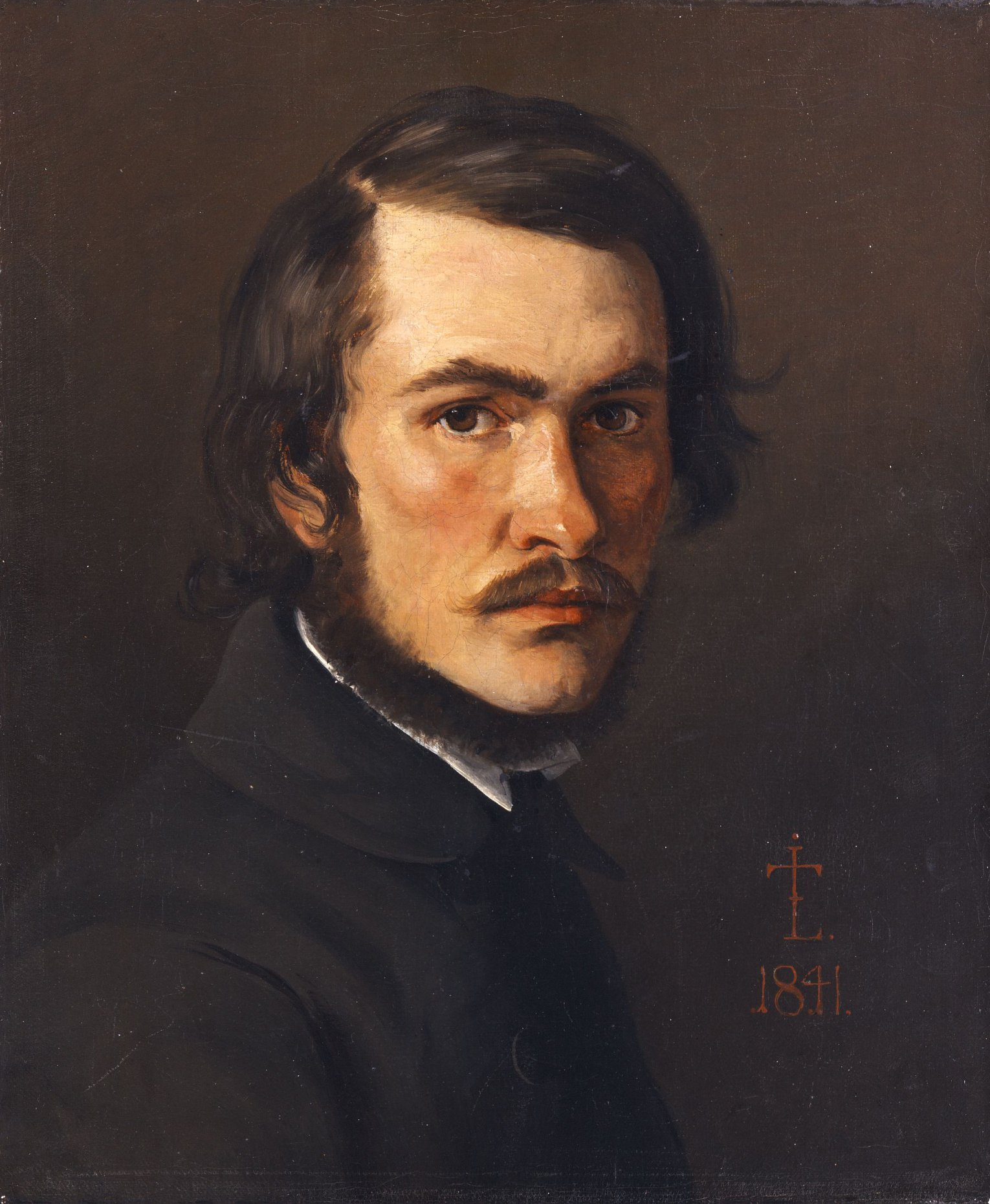
- Self-portrait, Ny Carlsberg Glyptotek (1841)
- Born: 1 September 1818; Kalundborg, Denmark
- Died: 26 April 1848 (aged 29)
- Education: Royal Danish Academy of Fine Arts
- Known for: Painting

Johan Thomas Lundbye (1 September 1818 – 25 April 1848) was a Danish painter and graphic artist, known for his animal and landscape paintings. He was inspired by Niels Laurits Høyen's call to develop nationalistic art through depictions of Denmark's characteristic landscapes; the historical buildings and monuments, and the country's simple, rural people. He became one of his generation's national romantic painters, along with P. C. Skovgaard and Lorenz Frølich, to regularly depict the landscape of Zealand.

== Biography ==
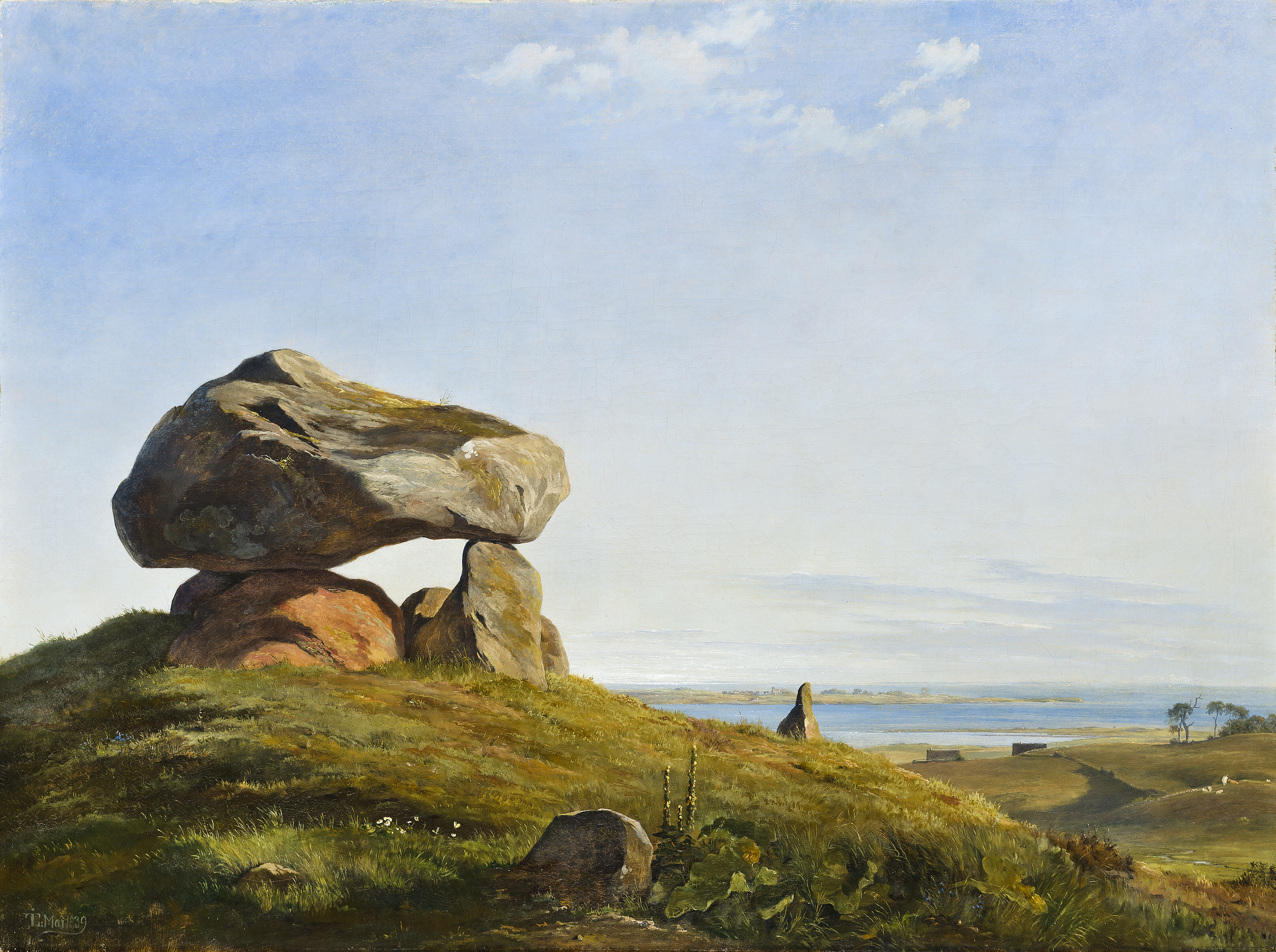
An Ancient Burial Mound by Raklev on Refsnæs (1839)

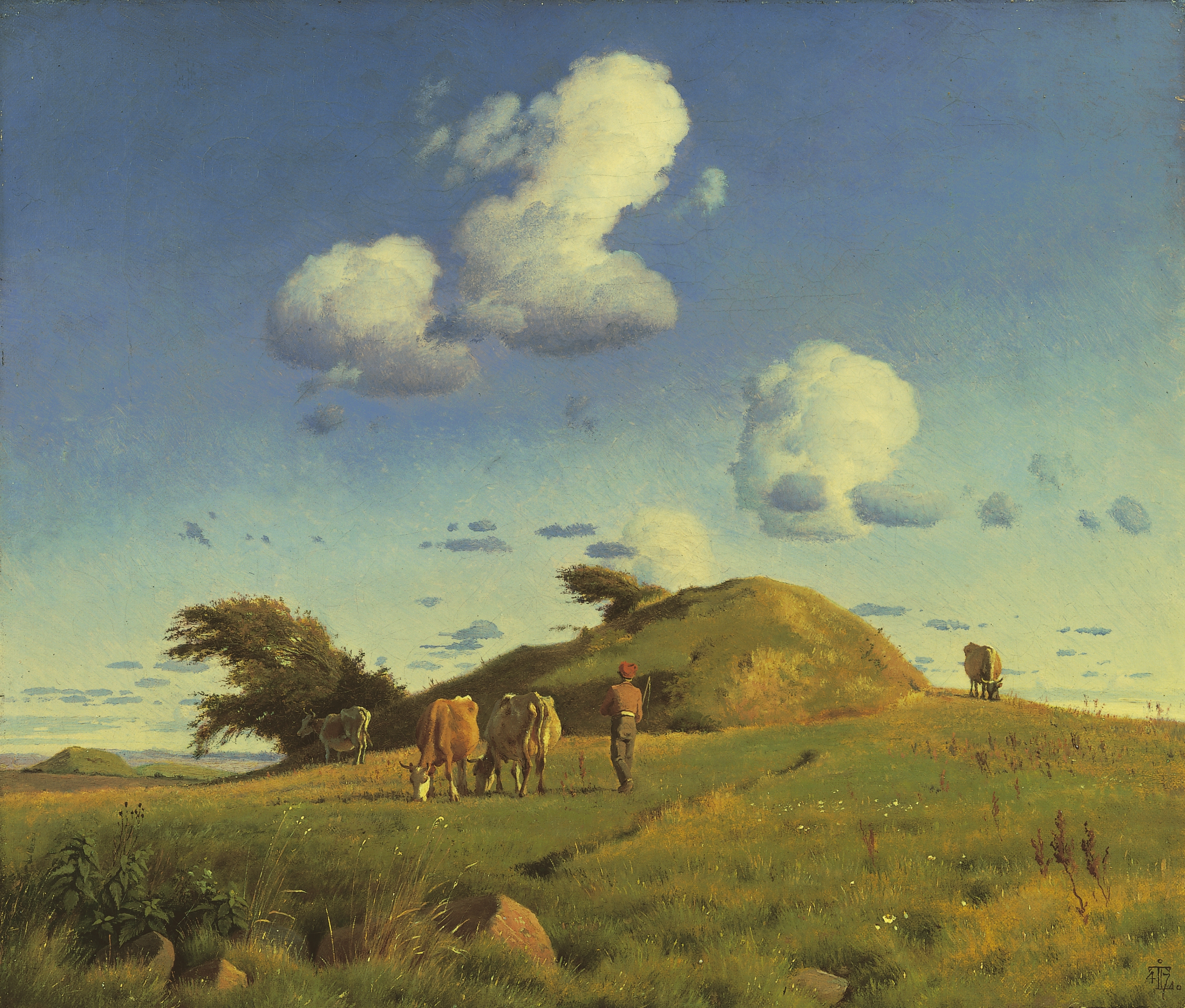
Autumn Landscape. Hankehøj at Vallekilde (1847)

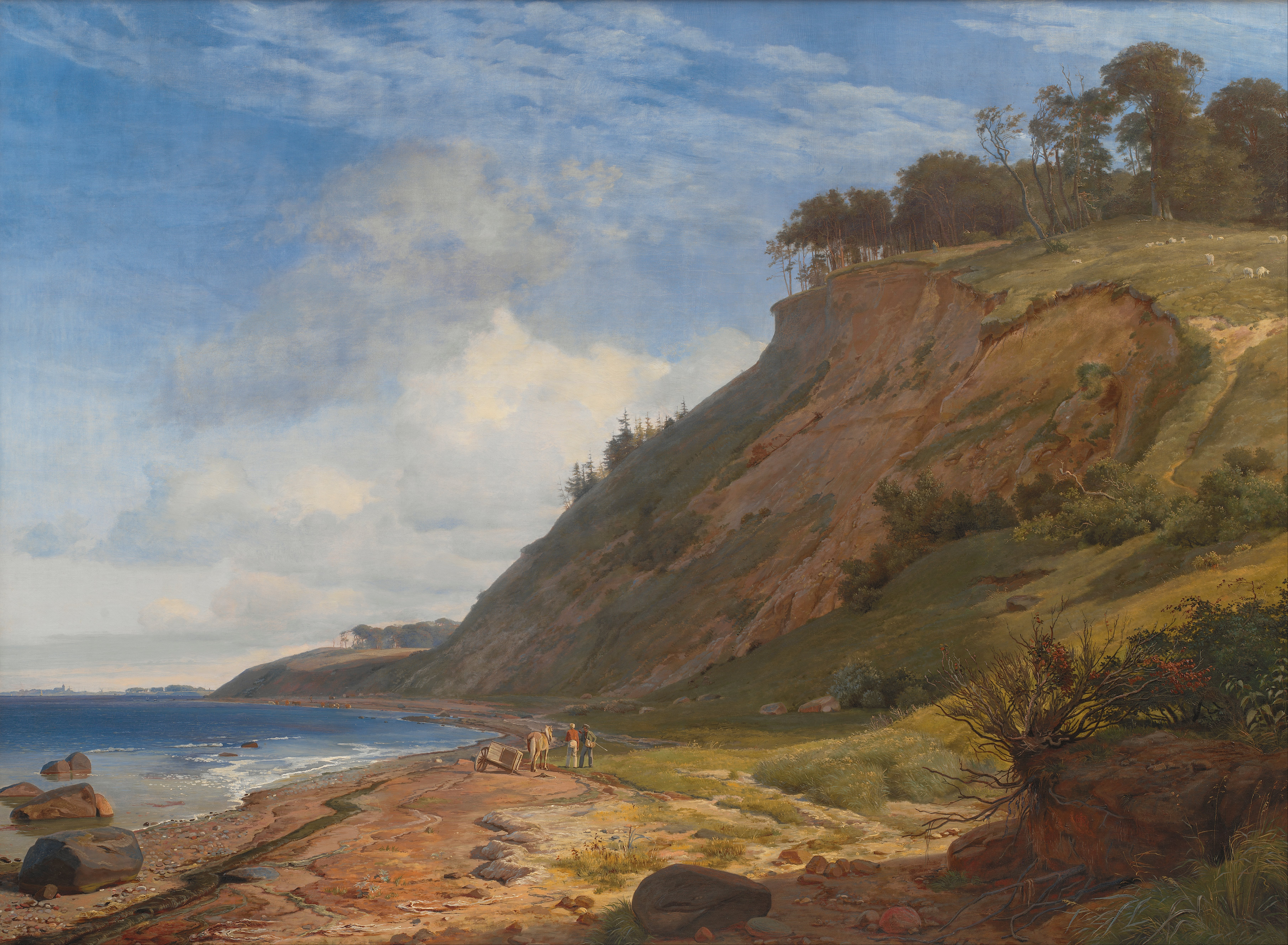
A Danish Coast. View from Kitnæs on Roskilde Fjord (1843)

He was born in Kalundborg on the island of Zealand, Denmark. He was one of the sons of Joachim Theodor Lundbye (1778–1841) and Cathrine Bonnevie (1792–1863). He came from a military family and was the brother of Christen Carl Lundbye (1812–1873) and Emanuel Andreas Lundbye (1814–1903) both of whom served as Danish military officers.

He was sickly as a child and moved with his family to Copenhagen. The family later came to Frederikssund, where after his father's death, he returned with his mother to Kalundborg. He studied privately under animal painter Christian Holm (1804–1846) and at the age of 14 he came into the drawing school of Johan Ludwig Lund (1777–1867).

In 1832, he came to the Royal Danish Academy of Art in Copenhagen, where he finished in 1842. He began exhibiting in 1835, and in 1839 he made En gravhøj fra oldtiden ved Raklev på Refsnæs (An Ancient Burial Mound by Raklev on Refsnæs (1839) and his painting Parti af Dyrehaven med Hjorte og Hinde (View of the Deer Park with Stag and Hind) was purchased by Kunstforeningen, the influential art society associated with art historian and critic Niels Laurits Høyen (1798–1870).

In the years to come he would focus his painting on depicting landscapes. His large "Kystparti ved Isefjord" ("Coast View by Isefjord") was exhibited in 1843 and purchased by the Royal Painting Collection, now the Danish National Gallery (Statens Museum for Kunst). He illustrated Fabler for Børn: Et halvhundrede Billeder by poet Hans Vilhelm Kaalund (1818–1885), a book of poetry for young children published in 1845.

He received a travel grant from the Academy in 1845, which was renewed a year later. On 5 June 1845 he left Denmark and traveled through Germany (Altona, Düsseldorf, Cologne, Mainz, Strasbourg), over the Rhine to Switzerland (Basel, Geneva) to France (Marseilles), and then to Italy, where he painted "Oxer i den romerske Kampagne" ("Oxen in the Roman Campagne"), which was exhibited in 1847 and purchased by the Royal Painting Collection.

He returned to Denmark on 18 July 1846 after a year and half. He surprised his circle of friends and announced that he was going to live in the country for a year, and took a little farm near Helsingør. However, the First War of Schleswig, known in Denmark as the Three Years' War (Treårskrigen), broke out and in the spring of 1848 he enlisted in the army like many other young artists. He died eight days later on 26 April 1848 at the age of 29. There is some question as to whether he died from an accidental shot, or whether the chronically depressed artist killed himself.

== See also ==
- List of Danish painters
