= Emilie Pohlmann =

German operatic soprano (1800–1875)

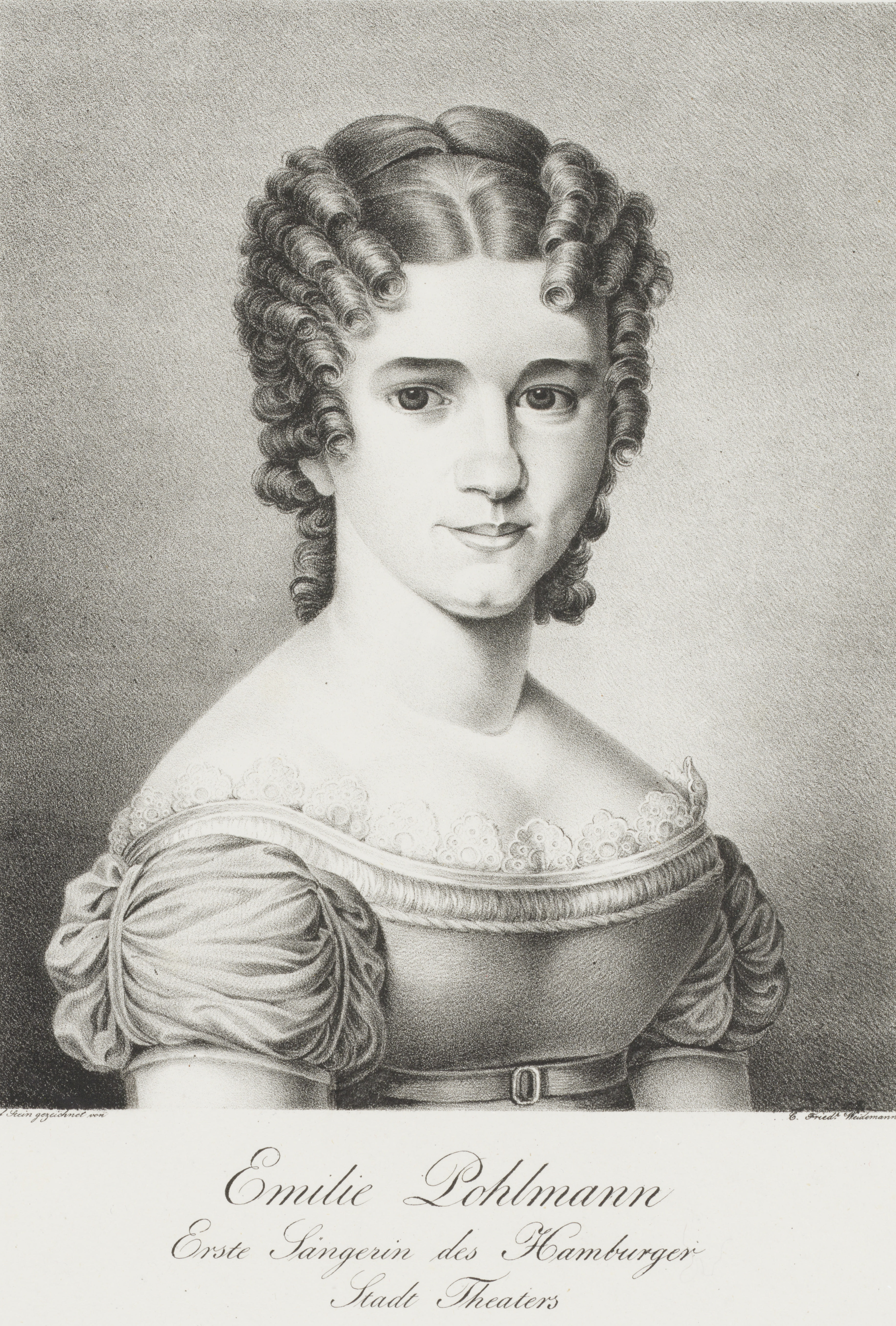
Emilie Pohlmann; Lithography by Carl Friedrich Weidemann (1821)

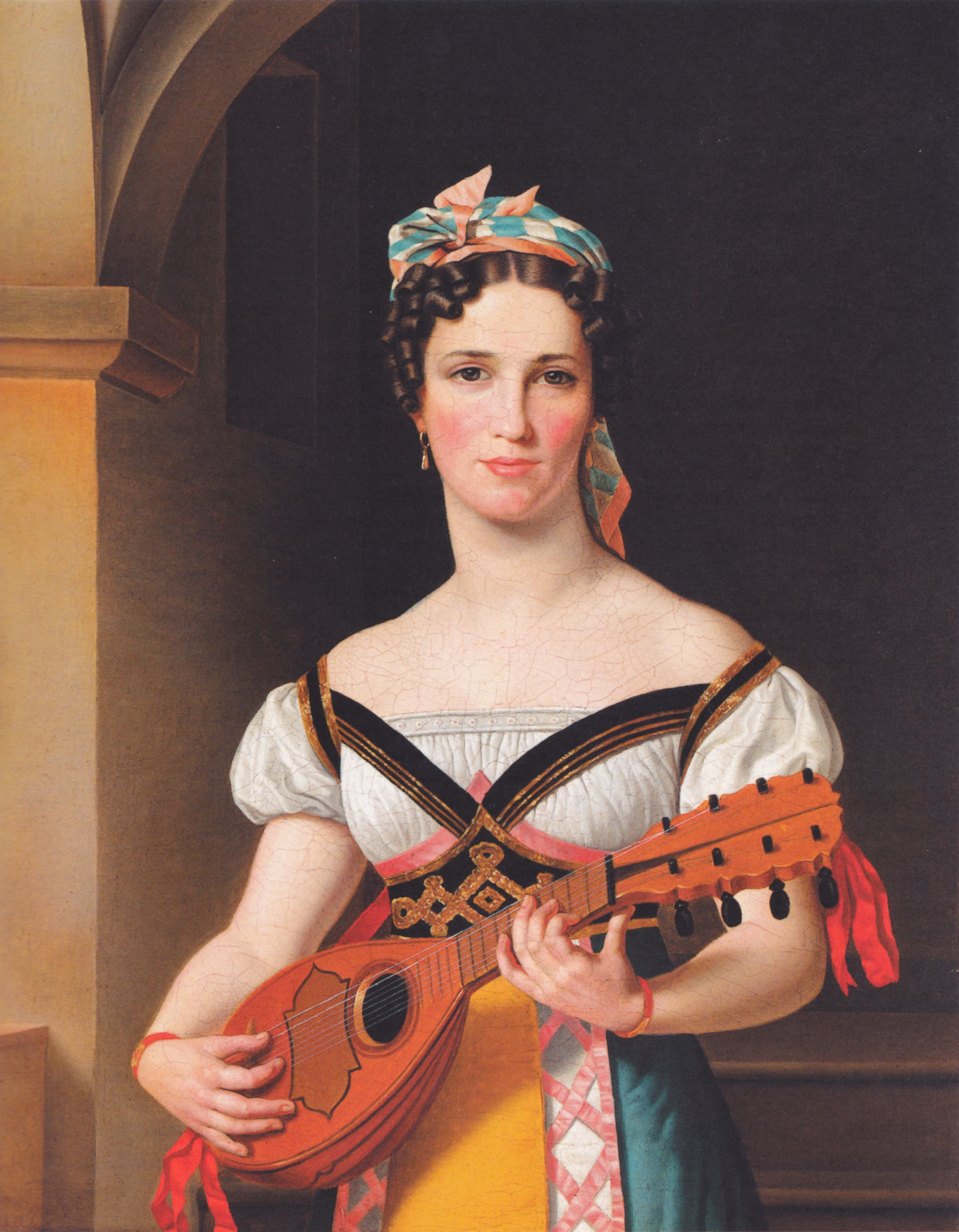
Eckersberg: Emilie Pohlmann as Preciosa 1825

Emilie Pohlmann (born ca. 1800 – 27 or 28 July 1875 in Bernburg) was a German operatic soprano.

== Life ==
Born in Berlin, Pohlmann had her first engagement from November 1813 to February 1818 at the Nationaltheater Mannheim. In 1818–19 she appeared at the Aachen Theatre and was announced as a singer from Brunswick at a guest performance in 1819 at the Hanover Theatre. From March 1819 she worked as a first singer for several years at the Hamburg State Opera. Guest appearances during this time took her to the stages of Braunschweig, Breslau, Bremen, Pyrmont, Copenhagen, Riga, Königsberg, St Petersburg and Munich.

In 1828, she married the flautist Otto Kressner, whom she divorced in 1837.

From 1833 to 1835, she was engaged at the Riga Theatre. Guest performances followed in Königsberg, Elbing and again in Riga, Berlin, Potsdam and finally documented in 1844 at the theatre in Königsberg.

== Portraits ==
The portrait painted by Christoffer Wilhelm Eckersberg in 1825 on the occasion of her concert in Copenhagen depicts her as Preciosa. It was a commissioned work for the Copenhagen merchant Mendel Levin Nathanson from Altona. The painting is known on the art market and is privately owned.

In addition, the Staats- und Universitätsbibliothek Hamburg owns a lithograph of a portrait made in 1821 by the Hamburg portrait painter and lithographer Carl Friedrich Weidemann (1770–1843).
