= Emanuel Larsen =

Danish painter

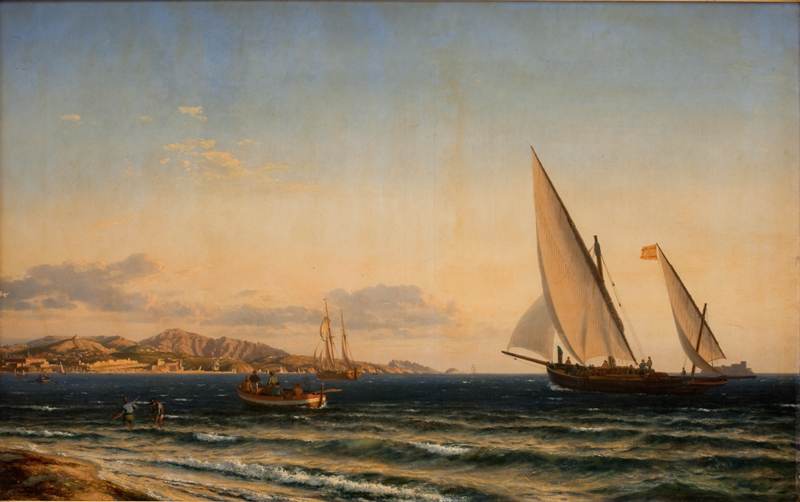
Emanuel Larsen: Aften ved Middelhavet. I baggrunden Marseille og øen If (1854)

Carl Frederik Emanuel Larsen usually known as Emanuel Larsen (15 September 1823, Copenhagen – 24 September 1859, Copenhagen) was a Danish painter who specialized in marine painting.

== Biography ==
Larsen was admitted to the Royal Danish Academy of Fine Arts in January 1839 where he was a student of Christoffer Wilhelm Eckersberg and Frederik Theodor Kloss. Under Eckersberg, he specialized in marine painting. In 1845, he exhibited his Morgen ved Sjællands Kyst which was purchased by the Statens Museum for Kunst. The same year, he travelled on a naval ship to the Faroe Islands and Iceland and from 1852–54 to England, Holland, Belgium, Paris and the French Mediterranean coast.

He was awarded the Neuhausen Prize in 1851 for Udsigt fra Langelinie mod Nyholm med Mastekranen. Morgenbelysning. Despite his interest in Dutch marine art, Larsen was probably the Danish artist who was least influenced by foreign works. The influential Christian Jürgensen Thomsen (1788- 1865) praised Larssen's work, commenting that his paintings showed he had "an eye for the fresh, open life at sea" and that his ships were "not still but really appear to move". Larsen died in September 1859 after a short illness.

== Gallery ==
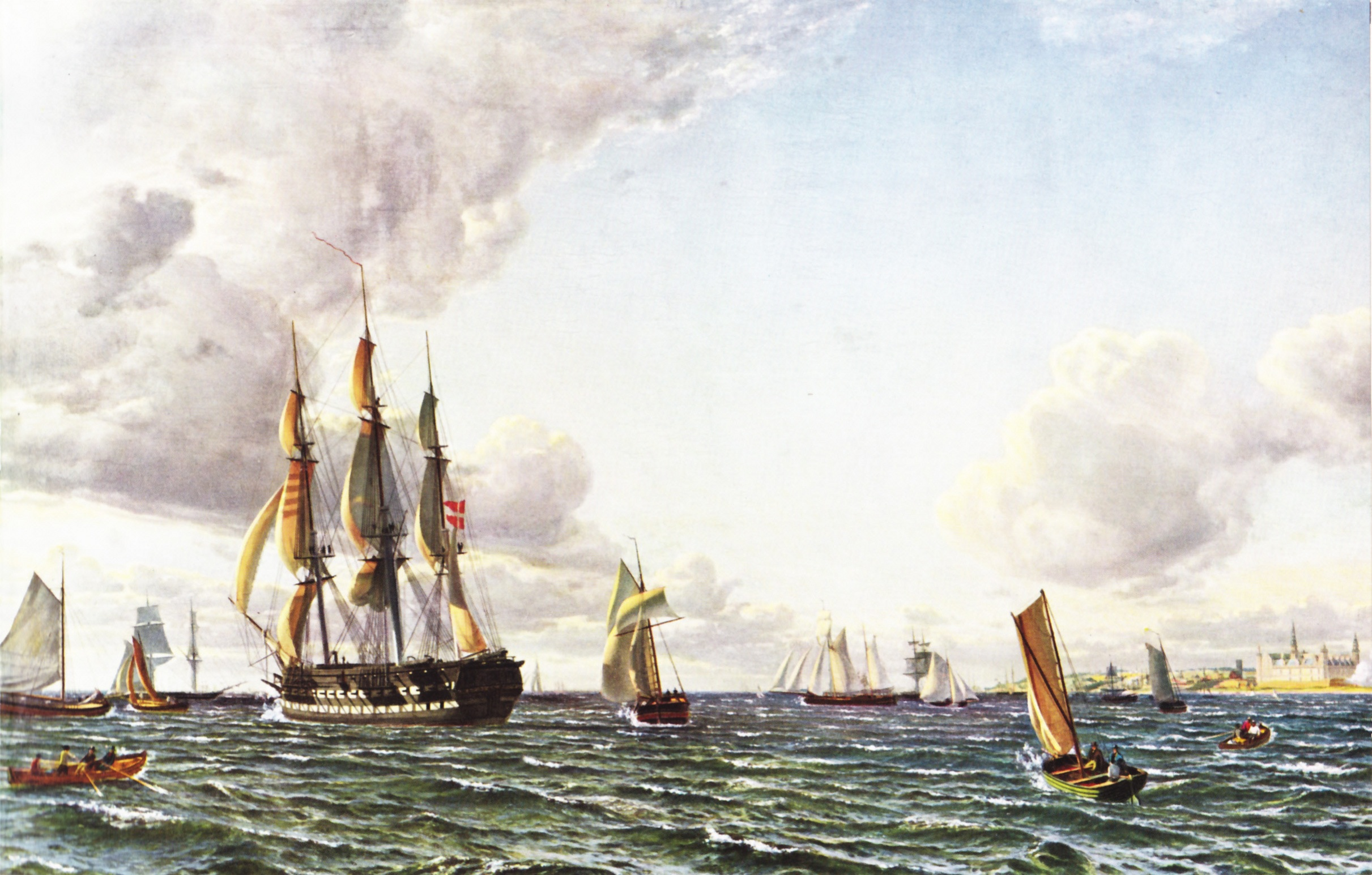
Linieskibet "Valdemar" krydser Sundet ind for en frisk bramsejlskuling (1856)

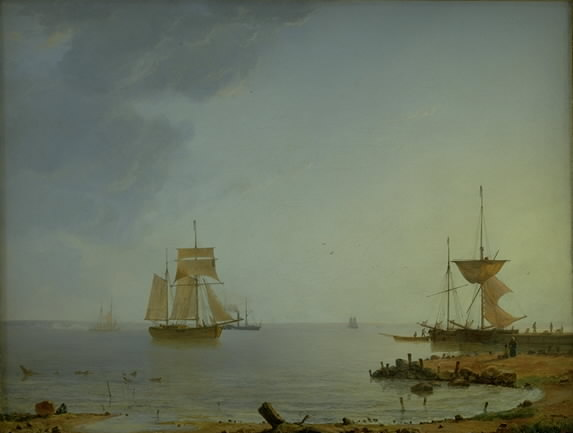
Skibe ved Sjællands kyst Morgen (1845)

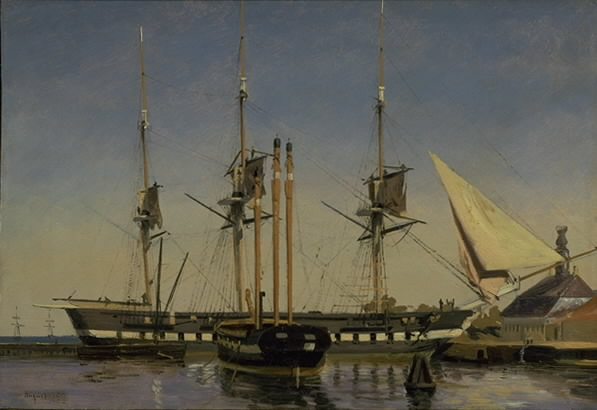
Fregatten "Niels Juel" ved hovedvagten på Nyholm (1857)

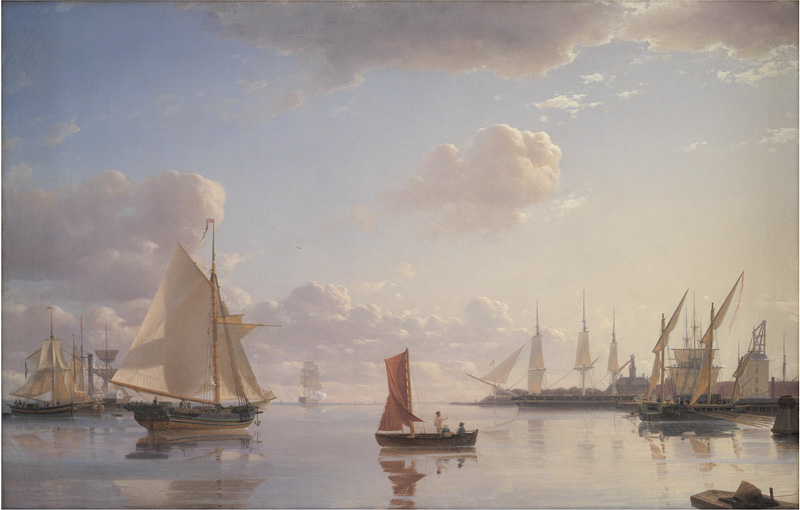
Udsigt fra Langelinie mod Nyholm med Mastekranen Morgenbelysning (1850)
