= A View towards the Swedish Coast from the Ramparts of Kronborg Castle =

Painting by Christoffer Wilhelm Eckersberg

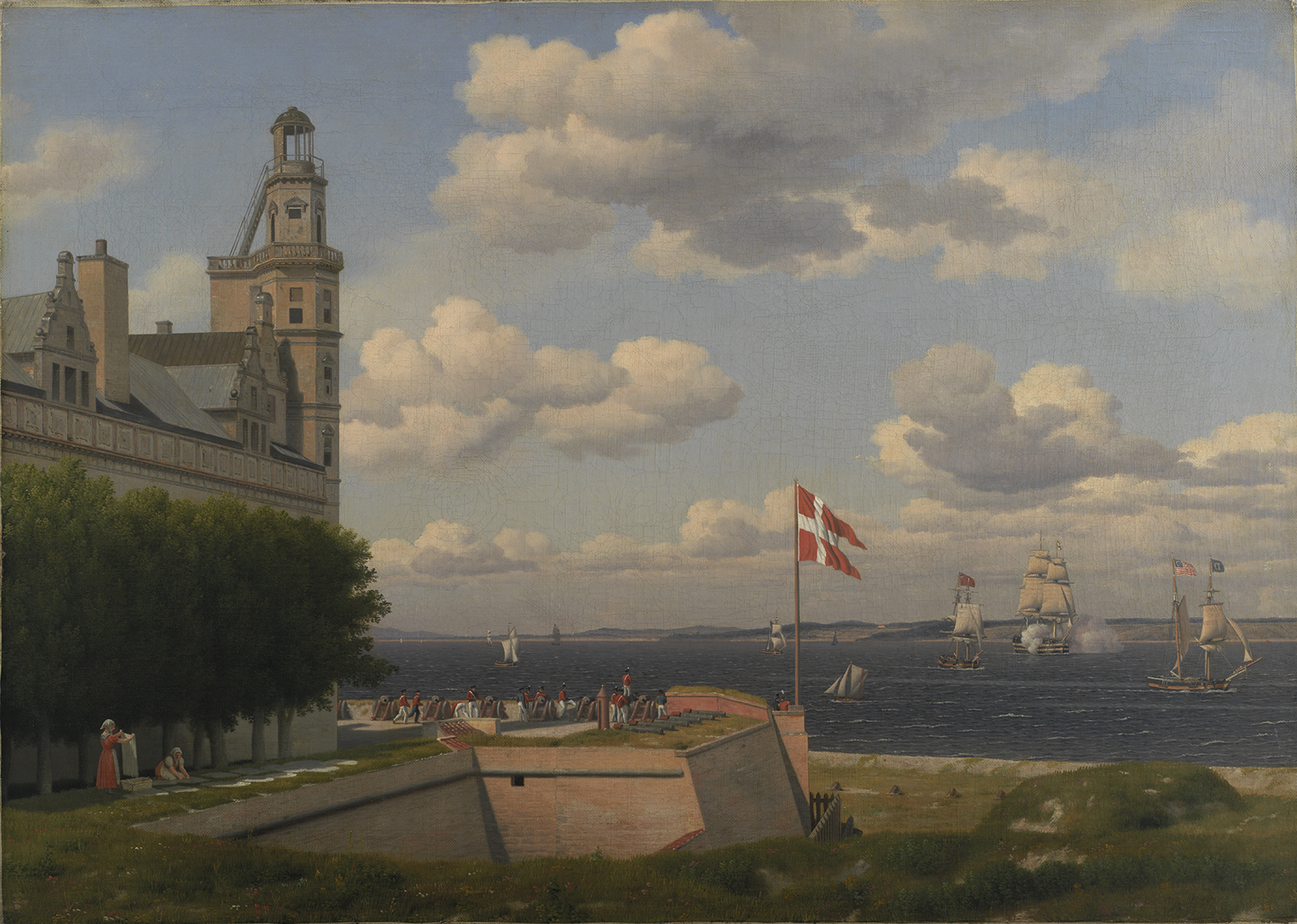
- Artist: Christoffer Wilhelm Eckersberg
- Year: 1829
- Type: Oil on canvas, landscape painting
- Dimensions: 66 cm × 47 cm (26 in × 19 in)
- Location: National Gallery of Denmark; Copenhagen

A View towards the Swedish Coast from the Ramparts of Kronborg Castle (Danish: Udsigt fra Kronborg Vold over flagbatteriet og Sundet til den svenske kyst) is an 1829 landscape painting by the Danish artist Christoffer Wilhelm Eckersberg. It depicts a view from the castle at Kronborg on the island of Zealand across the Sound towards the Swedish coast in Scania. A key strategic stronghold in the Baltic Region, its importance is emphasised by the soldiers on duty and the prominent Danish flag. Two maids are also in the foreground, drying laundry. In the background a number of ships are visible in the Sound.

Eckersberg was one of the pioneers of the Golden Age of Danish Art. Today the painting is in the collection of the National Gallery of Denmark in Copenhagen, having been acquired in 1913.

== Bibliography ==
- Boime, Albert. Art in an Age of Civil Struggle, 1848-1871. University of Chicago Press, 2008. ISBN 978-0-226-06342-3.
- Havell, Jane & Freudenheim, Adam (ed.) Baltic Light: Early Open-air Painting in Denmark and North Germany. Yale University Press, 1999. ISBN 978-0-300-08166-4.
- Monrad, Kasper. Danish Painting: The Golden Age. National Gallery, 1984.
