= Anton Dorph =

Danish painter

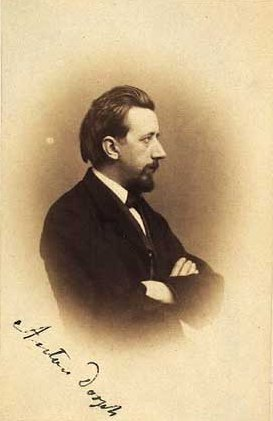
Anton Dorph (1866)

Anton Laurids Johannes Dorph (15 February 1831, in Horsens – 12 January 1914, in Copenhagen) was a Danish painter who is remembered for his altarpieces and his paintings of fishermen.

== Biography ==
Dorph entered the Danish Academy in 1845 where he studied under Christoffer Wilhelm Eckersberg. Later he received lessons from Wilhelm Marstrand (1849–50). After winning the Academy's silver medal, he began to exhibit portraits and genre paintings. With his portrait of the actor C.N. Rosenkilde (1856) which was displayed in the foyer of the Royal Danish Theatre he became increasingly well known. His full-figured portrait of the sculptor Evens brought him the Neuhausen Prize in 1857. The same year he began painting a series of works representing the fishermen of Zealand. He then turned to large religious works for altarpieces. Thanks to a stipend from the Academy, he travelled to Italy (1859–61) where he made several genre paintings including Fiskere i Sorrent, Sommeraften ved Solnedgang which was exhibited in 1860.

Even if he did not gain the same level of fame as Carl Heinrich Bloch, Dorph became quite popular, especially for his paintings of fishermen of which reproductions hung in a considerable number of Danish homes. His many altarpieces in the second half of the 19th century are also of note.

== Selected works ==
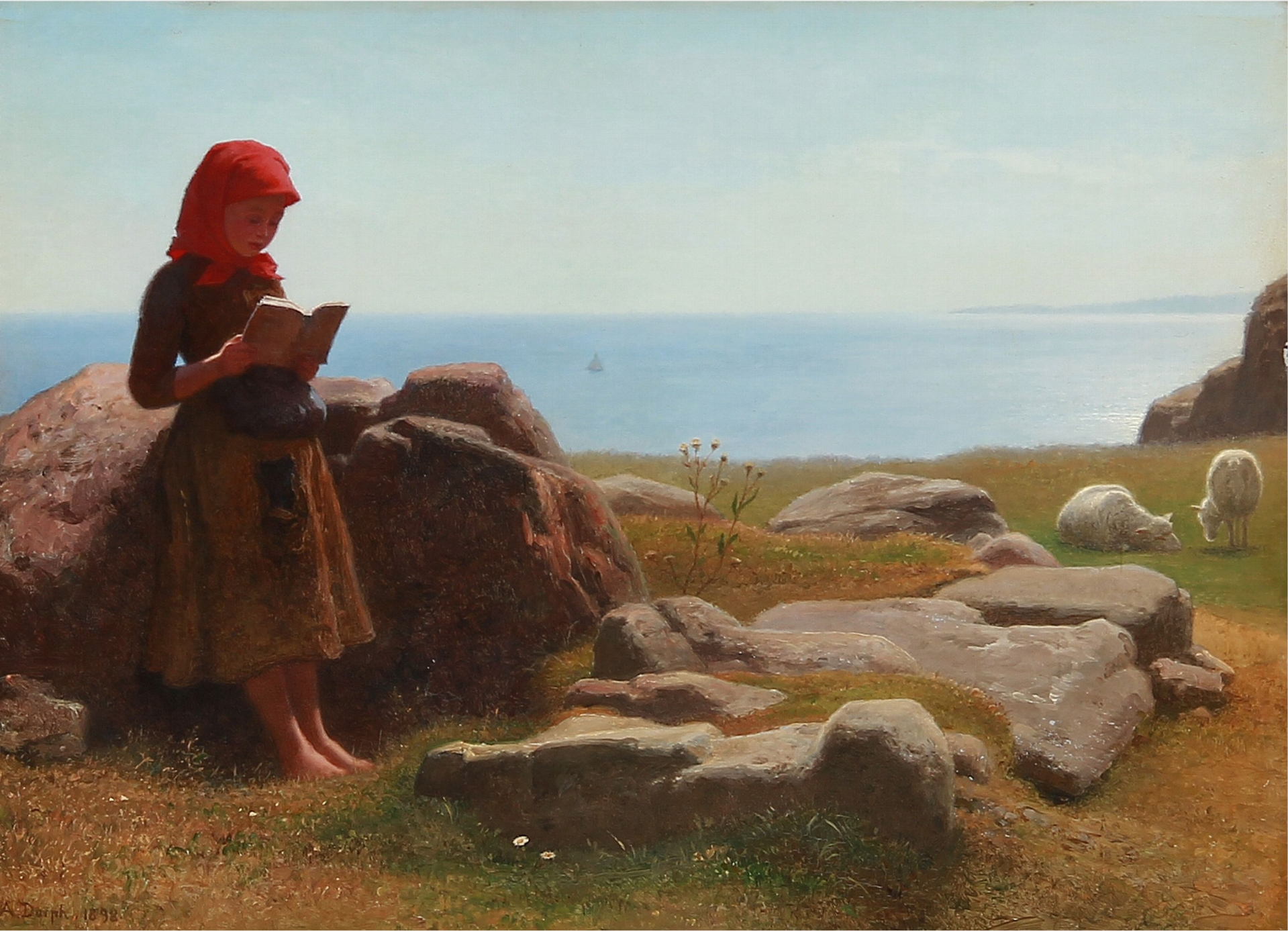
Summer Landscape, with Shepherdess Reading While her Flock Grazes

- En bondepige (1854)
- C.N. Rosenkilde (1855)
- Småpiger som leger på vej hjem fra skole (1863)
- Kristian Mantzius (1865)
- Ung fiskerkone, der venter sin mands hjemkomst fra søen (1867)
- Skattens mønt (1868)
- Julie Sødring (1870)
- Kristus velsigner disciplene (1873)
- Hovedet af en fisker (1879)
- Hornfiskefangst med drivvod, tidlig morgen (1880)
- Varm diset sommerdag ved stranden (1888)
- Kristus og synderinden (1882)
- Korsfæstelsen (1885)
