= A View through Three of the North-Western Arches of the Third Storey of the Coliseum =

Painting by Christoffer Wilhelm Eckersberg

- Udsigt gennem tre buer i Colosseums tredje stokværk (Danish)
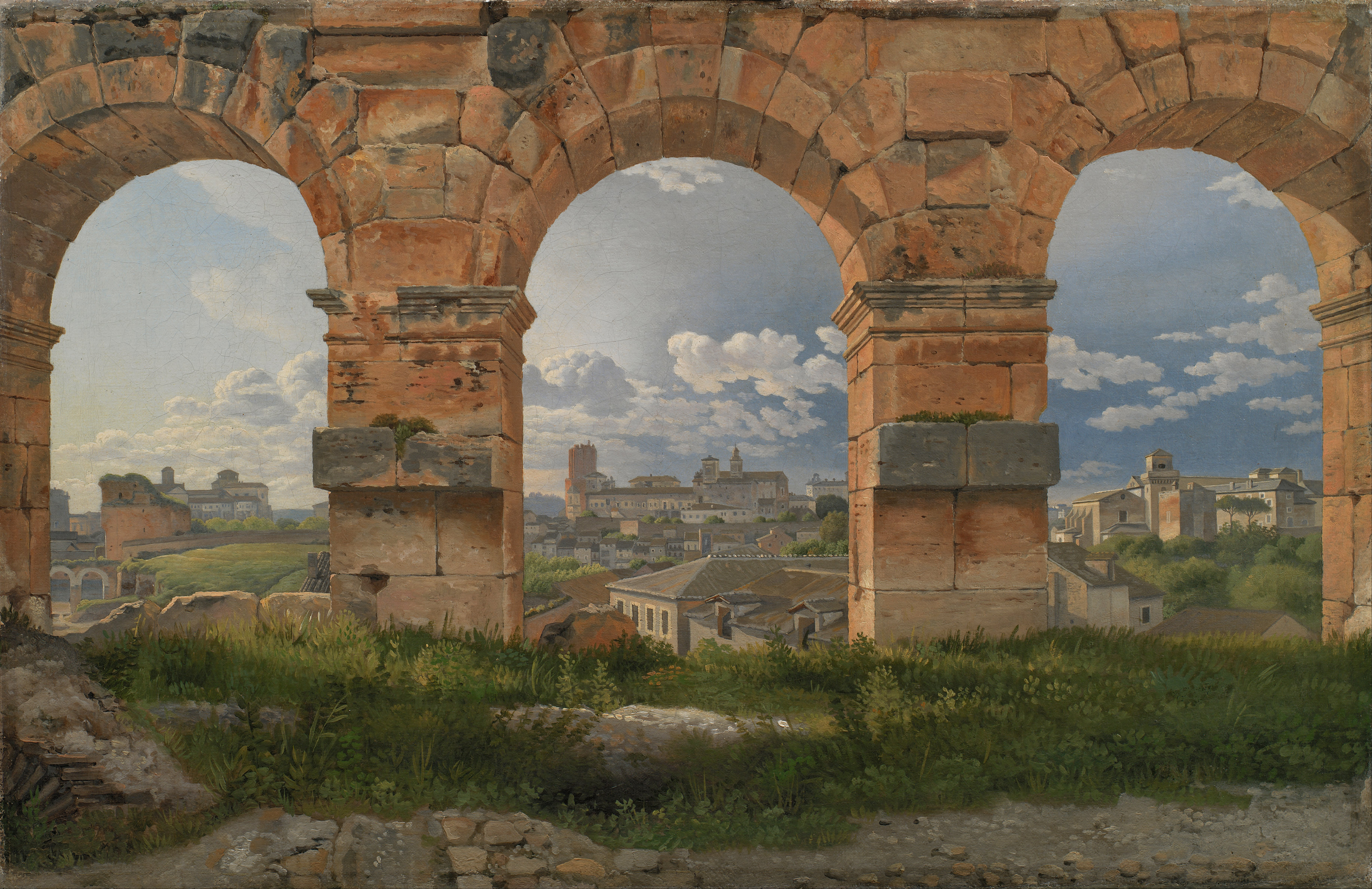
- Artist: C. W. Eckersberg
- Year: 1815 or 1816
- Medium: Oil on canvas
- Dimensions: 32 cm × 49.5 cm (13 in × 20 in)
- Location: National Gallery of Denmark, Copenhagen

A View through Three of the North-Western Arches of the Third Storey of the Coliseum is a painting by the Danish painter C. W. Eckersberg. It was painted in 1815 or 1816 when Eckersberg sojourned in Rome, painting a series of works of the ancient ruins of the city.

The details of the ruins are precisely observed as they appear at the Colosseum in Rome. The views of the city, however, are a construction as Eckersberg connected three separate views to create a new harmony. The Royal Engraving Collection has two sketches Eckersberg did to plan his work.

An example of Danish Golden Age painting, the work was included in a Danish canon on art.
