= Heinrich Eddelien =

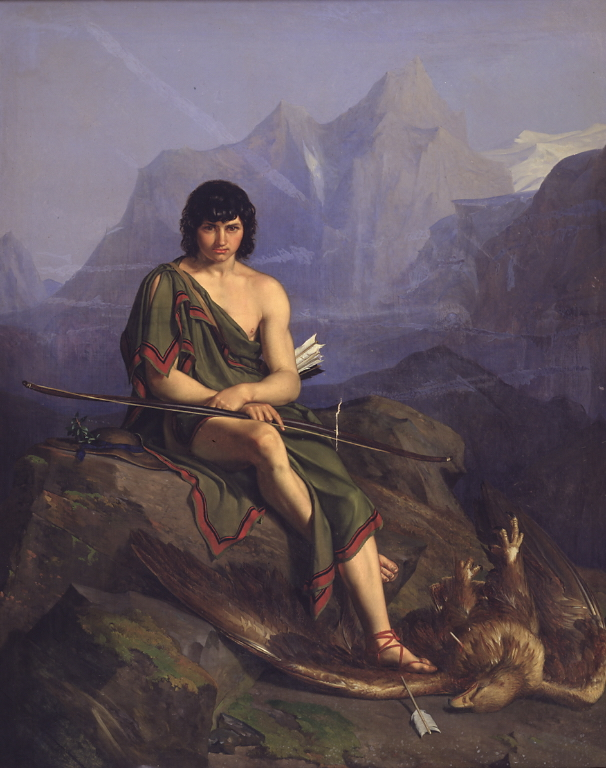
Heinrich Eddelien: En bueskytte der hviler efter at have dræbt en ørn (An archer resting after having killed an eagle).

Matthias Heinrich Elias Eddelien (22 January 1802 – 24 December 1852) was a Danish history painter of German origin.

== Biography ==
Eddelien was born in Greifswald which after 1815 became part of the Kingdom of Prussia. He was the son of David Niclas Erdelien and Johanna Dorothea Jäde. Eddelien arrived in Copenhagen as a young man and attended the Royal Danish Academy of Fine Arts from 1821 studying under Christoffer Wilhelm Eckersberg (1783–1853). In 1837, he was awarded the Academy's large gold medal. From 1839 to 1843, he travelled to Italy and Germany to widen his studies. His paintings often had motifs from ancient mythology or from the Bible. His altarpieces included at St. Nicolai Church in Svendborg (Svendborg Sankt Nikolai kirke).

His decorative works included the Pompeian Apartment in the Palace of King Christian VIII of Denmark at Amalienborg Palace. His principal work was the decoration of King Christian IV of Denmark's Chapel in Roskilde Cathedral but this led to paralysis in his right arm.

== Personal life ==
In 1839, he married Olivia Francisca Hjorth (1811-1892). Heinrich Eddelien died during 1852 while receiving spa treatment at Stuer, Germany. His widow later married goldsmith and artisan Jørgen Balthasar Dalhoff (1800-1890).
