= At a Window in the Artist's Studio =

Drawing by Christoffer Wilhelm Eckersberg

- Ved et vindue i kunstnerens atelier (Danish)
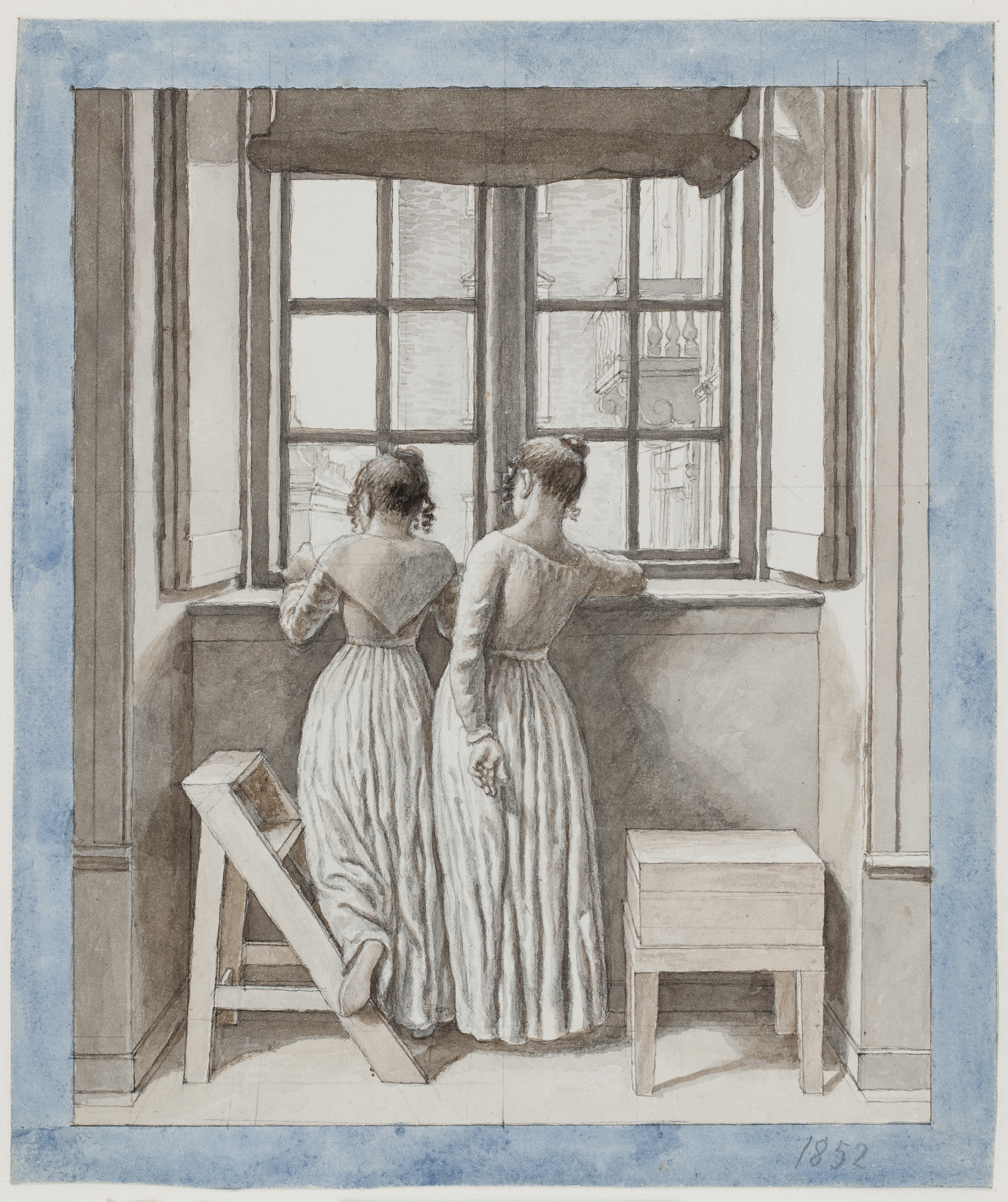
- Artist: C. W. Eckersberg
- Year: 1852
- Type: Pencil, pen, gray ink, brush, framed by light blue water color
- Dimensions: 27.4 cm × 23.1 cm (11 in × 9 in)
- Location: National Gallery of Denmark; Copenhagen

At a Window in the Artist's Studio is a drawing by the Danish painter, C. W. Eckersberg. It was done in 1852.

The drawing shows two girls by a window; these girls are probably the daughters of the artist. They are shown by a window facing Kongens Nytorv in Copenhagen but they are not watching anything on the square; they are reading a book.
