= The Marble Steps Leading to the Church of Santa Maria in Aracoeli in Rome =

Painting by Christoffer Wilhelm Eckersberg

- Marmortrappen, som fører op til kirken Santa Maria in Aracoeli i Rom (Danish)
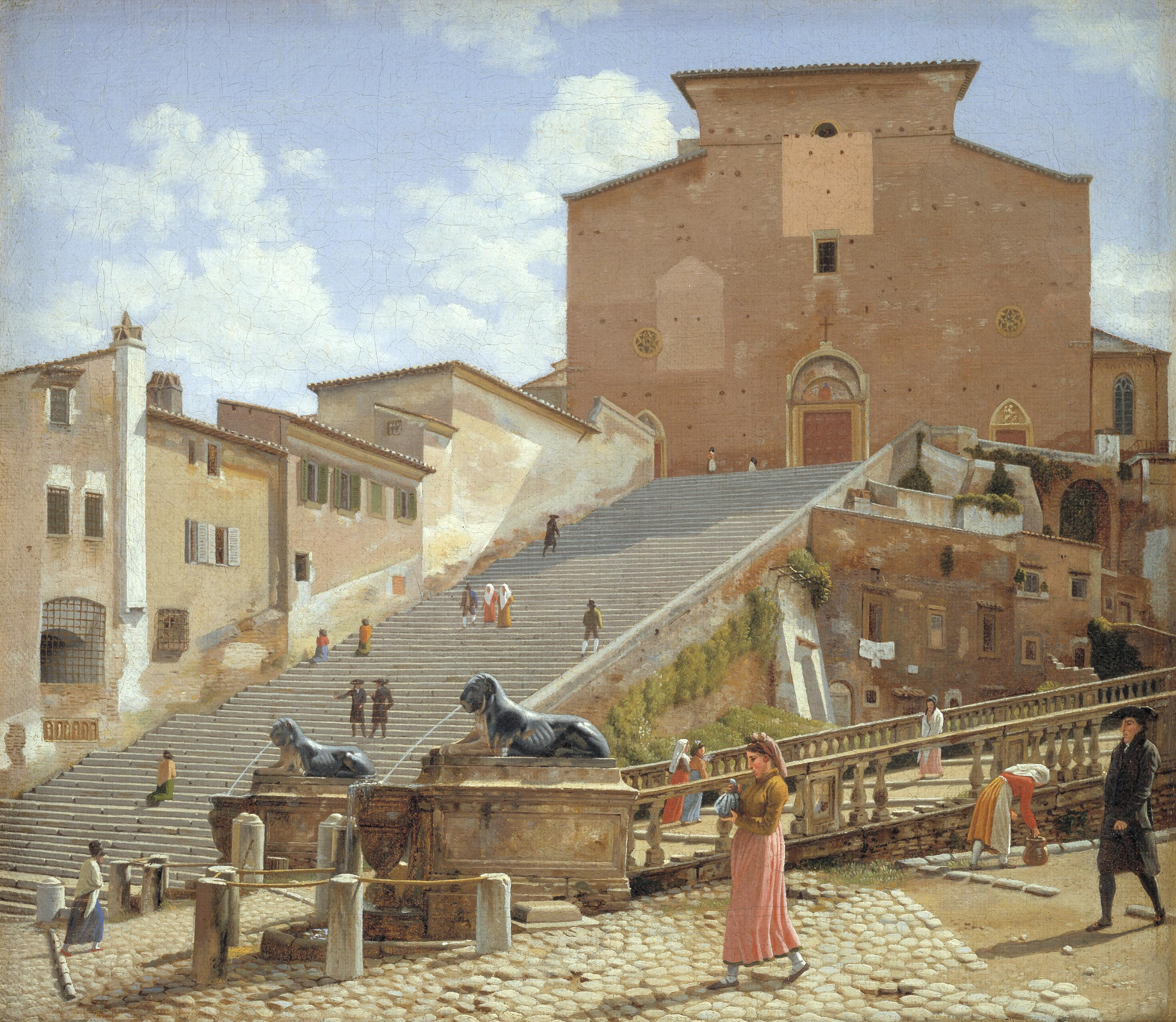
- Artist: C. W. Eckersberg
- Year: 1814–1816
- Medium: Oil on canvas
- Location: National Gallery of Denmark, Copenhagen

The Marble Steps Leading to the Church of Santa Maria in Aracoeli in Rome is an oil-on-canvas painting by the Danish painter C. W. Eckersberg. It was painted in 1814–1816.

Choosing a position from below, Eckersberg created a composition of firm vertical and diagonal lines in this painting of Santa Maria in Ara Coeli, a medieval church in Rome. He painted the picture while being outside and carefully recorded the mid-morning sunlight and shadows.
