= Frederik Theodor Kloss =

German-Danish painter

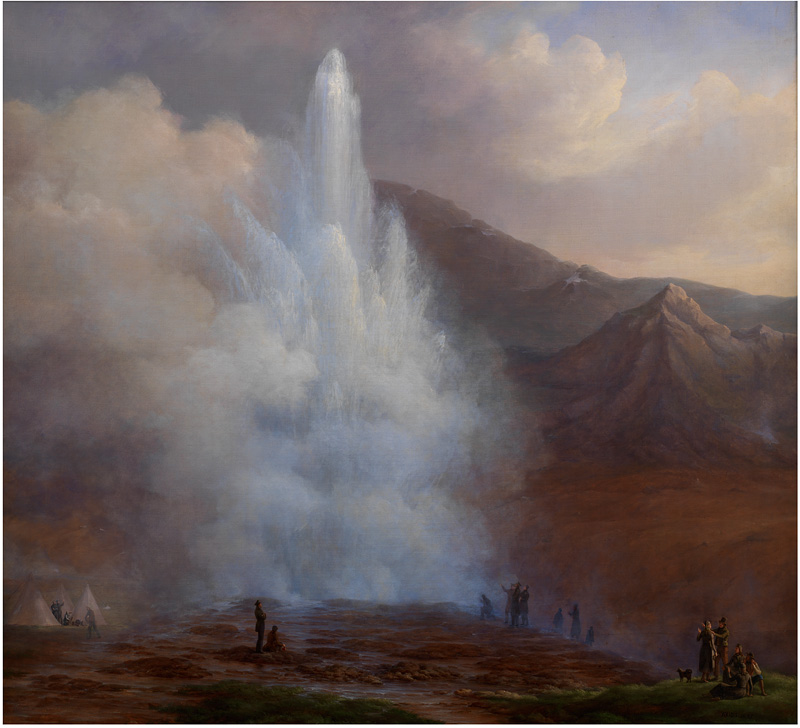
Store Geysir på Island under eruptionen i året 1834 (1835)

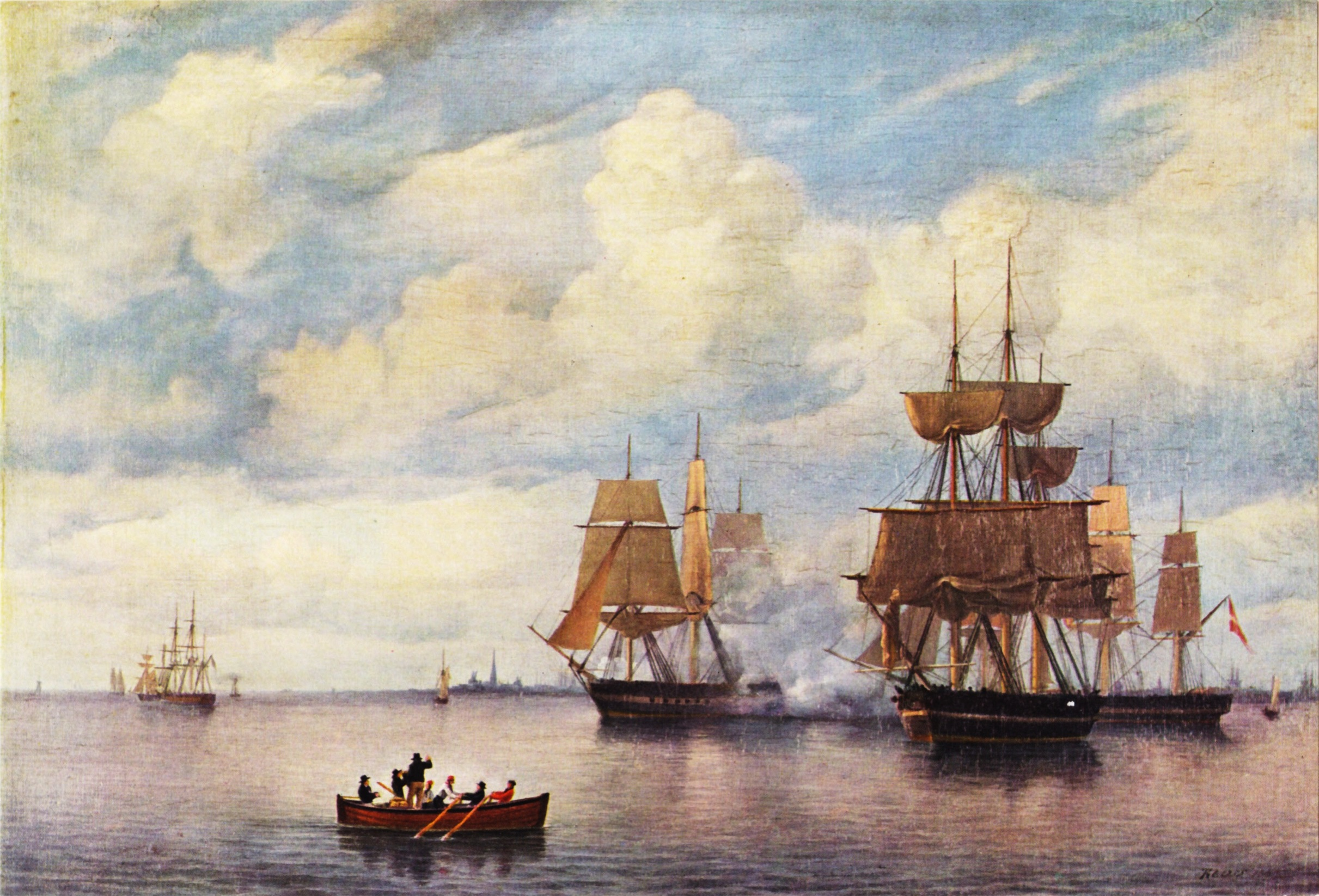
Den danske eskadre under sejl på Københavns rhed (1837)

Frederik Theodor Kloss (19 September 1802, in Braunschweig – 9 June 1876, in Copenhagen) was a German-Danish painter who specialized in marine painting.

== Biography ==
Kloss attended the Berlin Academy where he studied under Carl Schumann (1767-1827). He travelled to Prague, Breslau and Dresden (1825–27), North Sea (1832), Iceland (1834), the Mediterranean Sea (1843) and the Faroe Islands (1844). On seeing one of Christoffer Wilhelm Eckersberg's marine paintings in Dresden, Kloss decided to go to Copenhagen and become one of his students at the Danish Academy. Over the years, the two became great friends not only in art but also as members of the Free Masons. Kloss became fully integrated into Danish cultural life. After becoming a member of the Academy in 1840, he received a professorship in 1853 and was treasurer from 1867.

== Selected works ==
- Store Geysir på Island under eruptionen in året 1834 (The Great Geyser in Iceland during Eruption) (1835)
- Den danske eskadre under sejl på Københavns rhed (Danish Men-of-War in the Roads of Copenhagen) (1837)
- Et orlogsskib efter fransk konstuktion i færd med at kappe de master, der er gået over bord i en storm (A French-built Man-of-War Cutting away her Masts Swept Overboard in a Storm (1839)
- Havnen ved Nyborg. I forgrunded kutteren "Neptun" (The Harbour of Nyborg. In the Foreground the Cutter "Neptun") (1840)
