= Christoffer Wilhelm Eckersberg =

Danish painter (1783–1853)

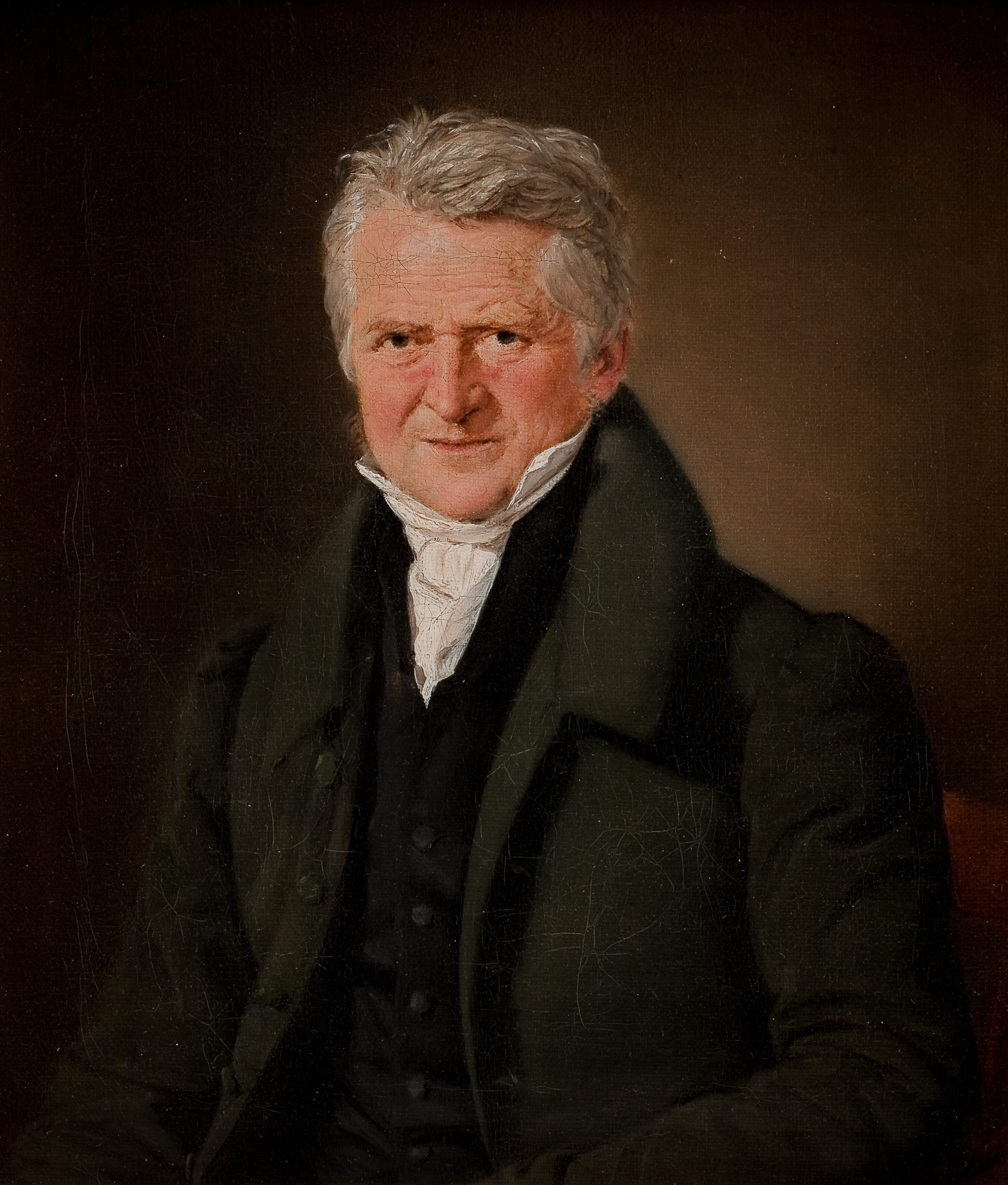
- Portrait by Christian Albrecht Jensen, 1832
- Born: 2 January 1783; Blåkrog, Denmark
- Died: 22 July 1853 (aged 70); Copenhagen, Denmark
- Resting place: Assistens Cemetery, Copenhagen
- Education: Royal Danish Academy of Fine Arts
- Known for: Painting clouds
- Movement: Danish Golden Age, Neoclassicism

Christoffer Wilhelm Eckersberg (2 January 1783 – 22 July 1853) was a Danish painter. He was born in Blåkrog in the Duchy of Schleswig (now in Aabenraa Municipality, in the southern part of Jutland in Denmark). He went on to lay the foundation for the period of art known as the Golden Age of Danish Painting, and is referred to as the "Father of Danish painting".

== Life ==
=== Growing up and early training ===
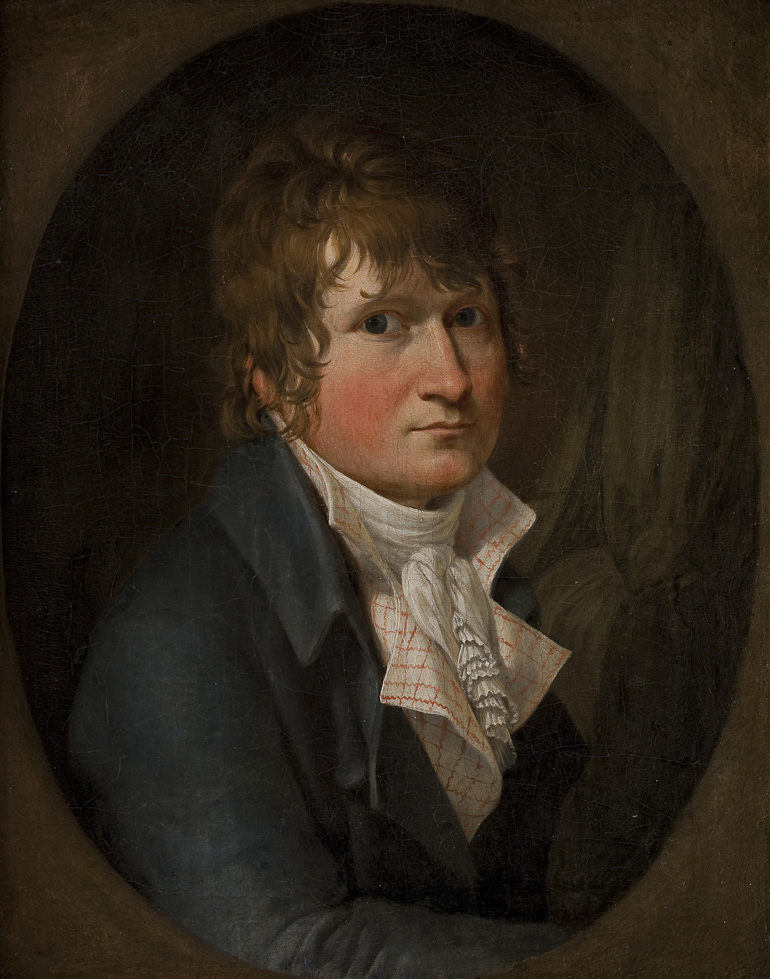
Self portrait at the age of twenty-eight (1811)

On 2 January 1783, Christoffer Wilhelm Eckersberg was born in Blåkrog in the Duchy of Schleswig (now in Aabenraa Municipality, in the southern part of Jutland in Denmark), to Henrik Vilhelm Eckersberg, a painter and carpenter, and Ingeborg Nielsdatter. In 1786 the family moved to Blans, a village near the Alssund, where he enjoyed drawing pictures of the surrounding countryside, and taking sailing tours in his father's boat. After confirmation he began his training as a painter under church and portrait painter Jes Jessen of Aabenraa (1797–1800). He continued his training at age 17 under Josiah Jacob Jessen in Flensborg, where he became an apprentice in May 1800. He, however, had his sights set on being accepted at the Royal Danish Academy of Art (Det Kongelige Danske Kunstakademi) in Copenhagen.

=== Training at the Academy ===
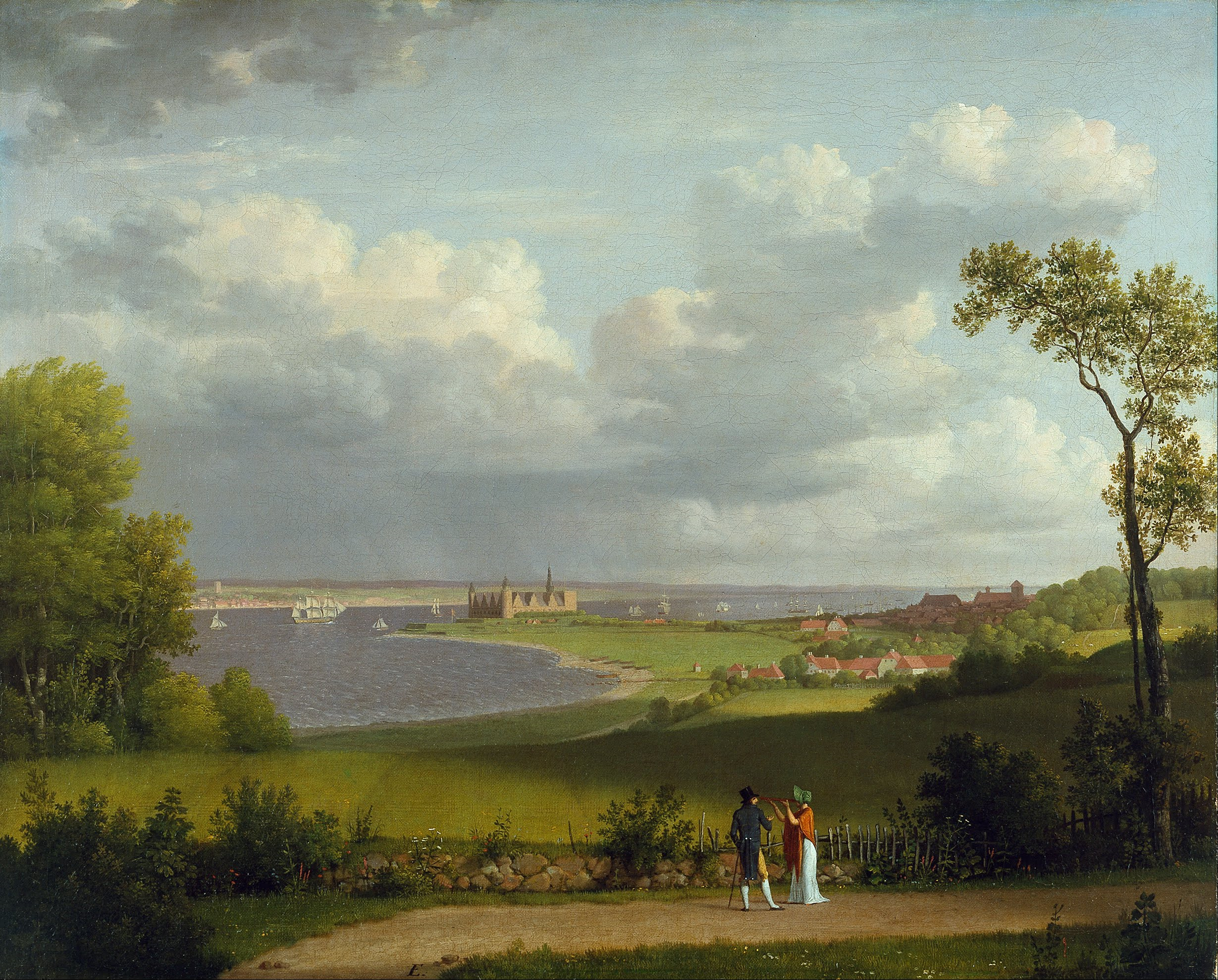
View north towards Kronborg Castle, Denmark

Still under apprenticeship, Eckersberg produced proficient drawings and paintings. Having amassed some money, including financial support from local well-wishers, he arrived at Copenhagen's Tollbooth on 23 May 1803. He was accepted into the Academy without payment in 1803, where he studied with Nikolaj Abraham Abildgaard, among others.

He made good progress, painting historical paintings, portraits and landscapes. However, friction between him and Abildgaard impeded his advancement, and he did not win the Academy's big gold medal until 1809, after Abildgaard's death. He also worked to earn living money as a hand labourer, and he made drawings for copperplate etchings.

Although he received promise of a travel stipend in conjunction with the gold medal, the actual funds would not be made available until 1812. On 1 July 1810, he married E. Christine Rebecca Hyssing against his wishes, in order to 'legitimize' a son, Erling Carl Vilhelm Eckersberg, who had been born to her. Erling eventually followed in his father's footsteps with an academy education, and a career as a copperplate engraver.

=== Student travels ===
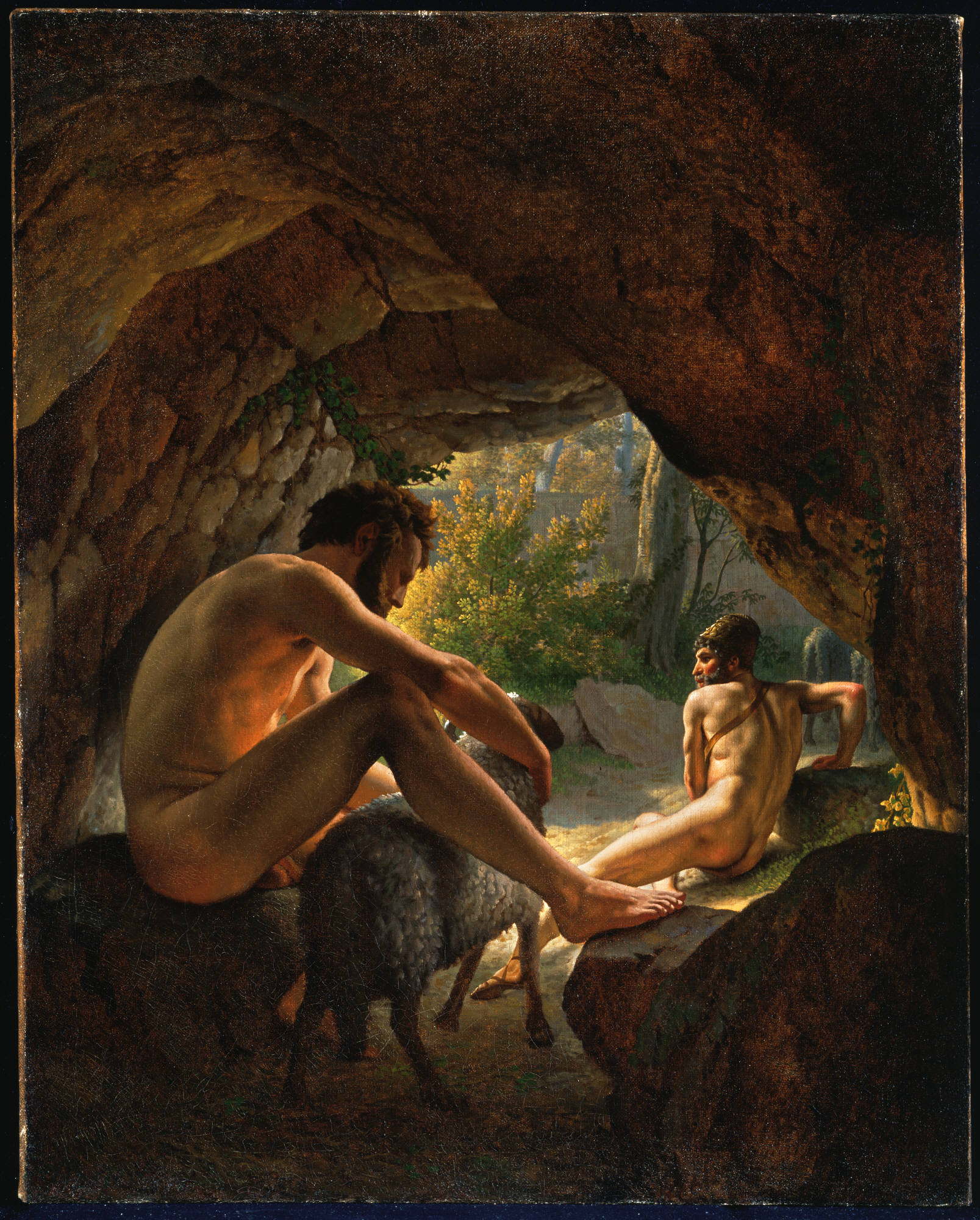
Ulysses Fleeing the Cave of Polyphemus, 1812, Princeton University Art Museum, painted while under the tutelage of Jacques-Louis David

Eager to travel, not only on account of his desire to stretch his artistic skills and knowledge, but also in order to escape the reality of his marriage, he made other arrangements for the financial support needed that would allow him to travel. On 3 July, a few days after the wedding, Eckersberg began his travels out of the country. Along with Tønnes Christian Bruun de Neergaard, writer, enthusiastic art lover and financial supporter, he made his way through Germany to Paris. Here he studied under neoclassicist Jacques-Louis David from 1811 to 1812. He improved his skills in painting the human form, and followed his teacher's admonition to paint after Nature and the Antique in order to find Truth. It was here that he developed a lifelong friendship with his Paris roommate and fellow artist Jens Peter Møller, and with engraver Johan Frederik Clemens, Jens Juel's collaborator.

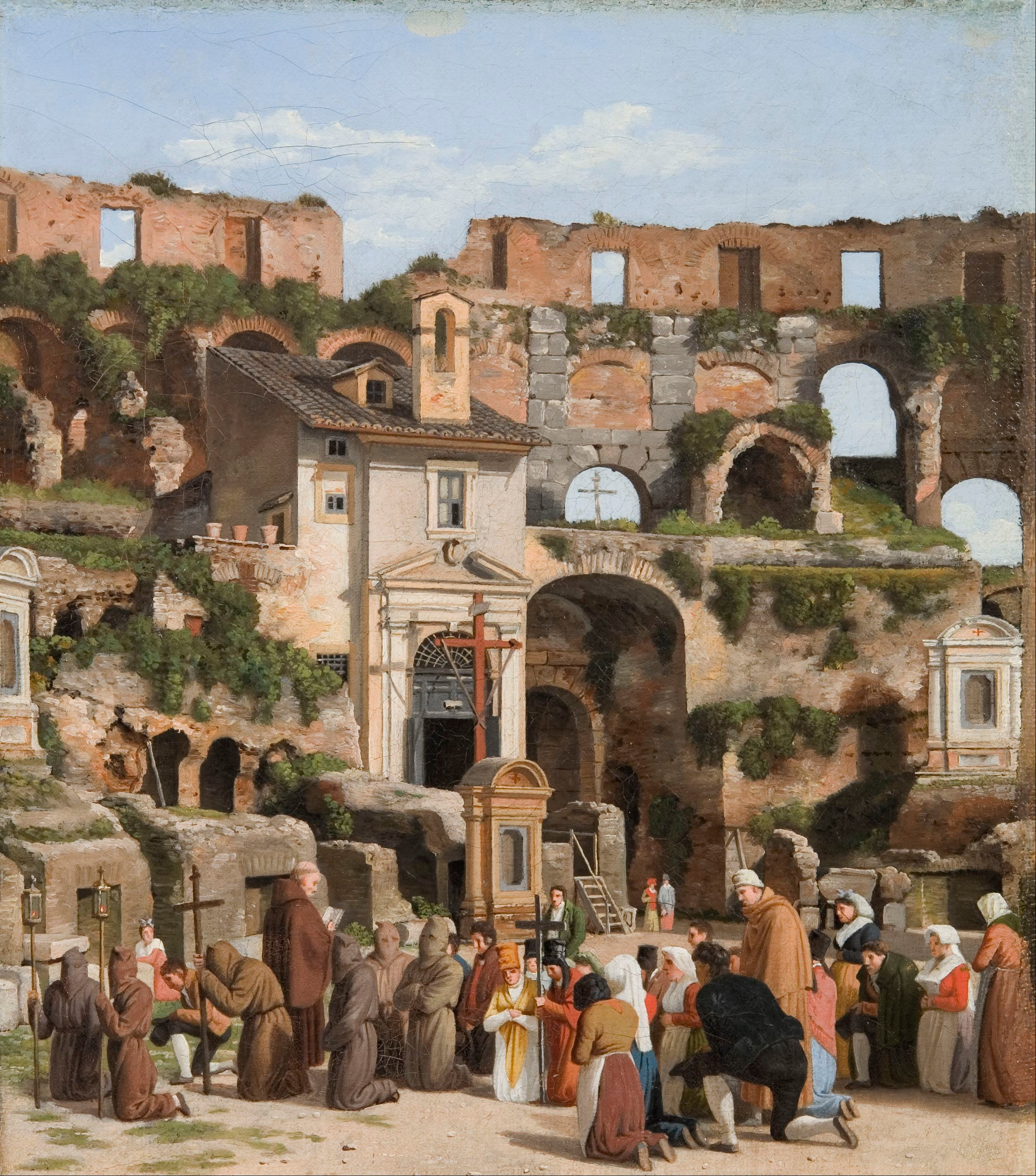
View of the interior of the Colosseum in Rome

After two years he travelled further via Florence to Rome where he continued his studies between 1813 and 1816. He worked on improving his skills as a history painter, and enjoyed painting smaller studies of the local life and area. He lived there three years among a large group of artists, with Bertel Thorvaldsen as the cultural head. Eckersberg and Thorvaldsen developed a close lasting relationship, and the master served the younger Eckersberg as both loyal friend and advisor. Eckersberg painted one of his best portraits, a portrait of Thorvaldsen, in Rome in 1814, which was donated to the Academy of Art. Life in Rome agreed with him, and he was greatly affected by the bright southern light he experienced there. He produced a large body of work during those years, including a number of exceptional landscape studies.

His divorce from Hyssing was finalized during his stay out of the country, and on 2 August 1816 he had returned to Denmark.

=== An academic career ===
Shortly after his return to Denmark Eckersberg arranged for his admission into the Academy, and received as the subject of his admissions painting the Norse legend, the Death of Baldur. On 8 February 1817 he wed Elisabeth Cathrine Julie Juel, daughter of Jens Juel, portrait painter and professor at the Academy. They had two sons and four daughters before her death in 1827.

He was admitted as a member of the Academy in October 1817, and was named professor there in 1818, having assumed the vacant professorship left after the death of Nikolaj Abraham Abildgaard in 1809. The Academy had waited to fill the position until Eckersberg returned to Denmark from his student travels, while delaying the attempts by Abildgaard's disciple, Christian Fædder Høyer, and by Christian Gotlieb Kratzenstein-Stub and J. L. Lund to seek the same position. Finally the Academy awarded the position not only to Eckersberg, but also to Lund.

A year after the death of his wife Elisabeth in 1827, he married her sister Susanne Henriette Emilie Juel, with whom he also had several children.

He was director of the Academy from 1827 to 1829. His eyesight failed him in later life and he had to give up painting. He died in Copenhagen of cholera on 22 July 1853 during the great epidemic. He is buried in Copenhagen's Assistens Cemetery.

== Works ==
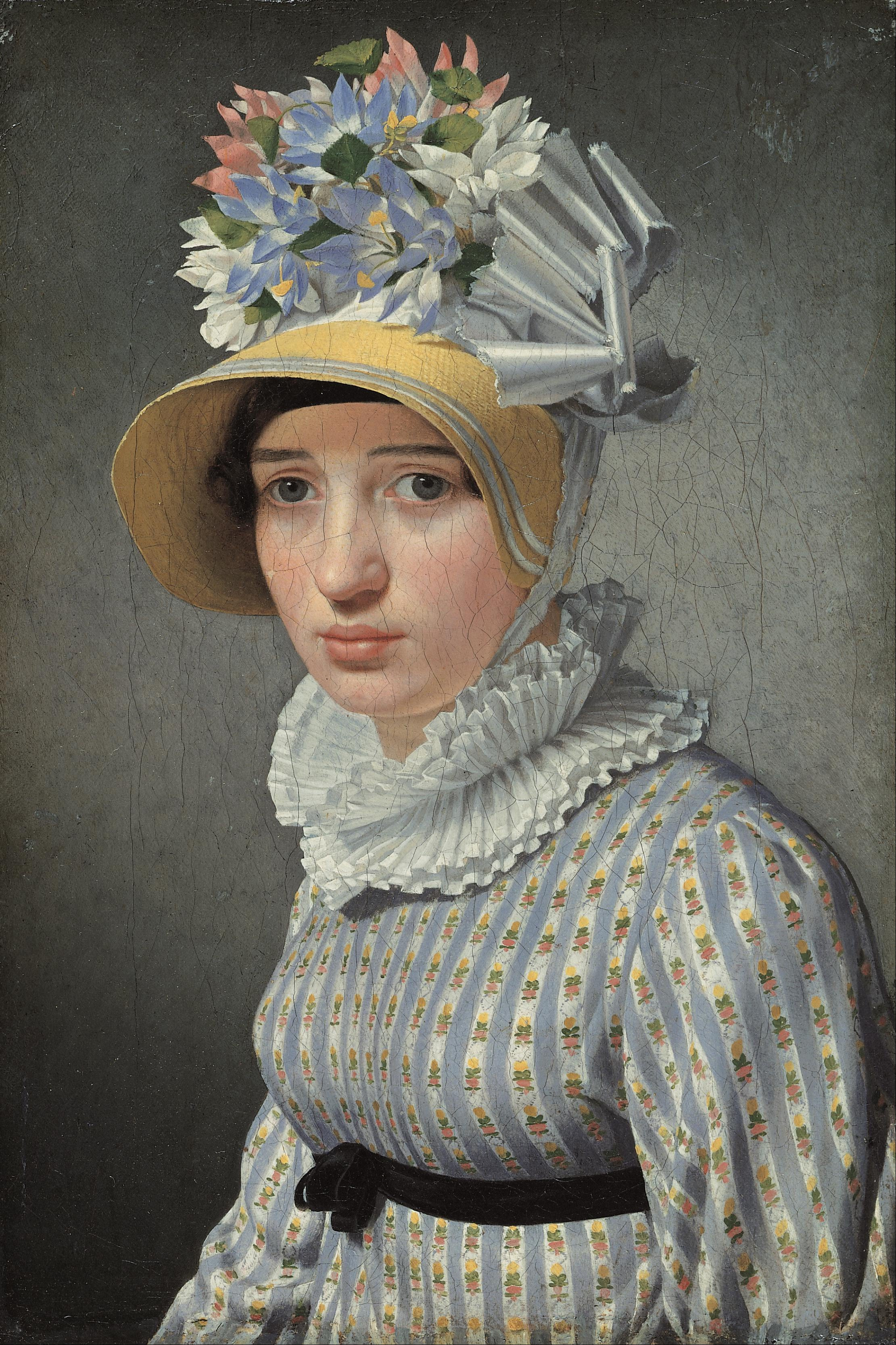
Portrait of Thorvaldsen's Italian mistress, Anna Maria Magnani

Eckersberg was commissioned to do a number of historical paintings for Christiansborg Palace, as well as altarpieces. His best known works are portraits of the Copenhagen middle class, such as the "Nathanson family picture" (Det Nathansonske Familiebillede), 1818, and the official portrait of Frederick VI (Frederik VI). In spite of his abilities in this genre, his career in portraiture was short-lived, due to the competition he received from then popular Christian Albrecht Jensen.

Marine paintings were another genre he developed with great interest. He had a passion for ships, and sailed around the Skagerrak, the Kattegat, the North Sea, and as far as the English Channel at the age of 56. The experience of sailing out on the open seas gave new dimension to his marine paintings, which until that point tended to be calm depictions. Now there was more attention given to movement and to waves.

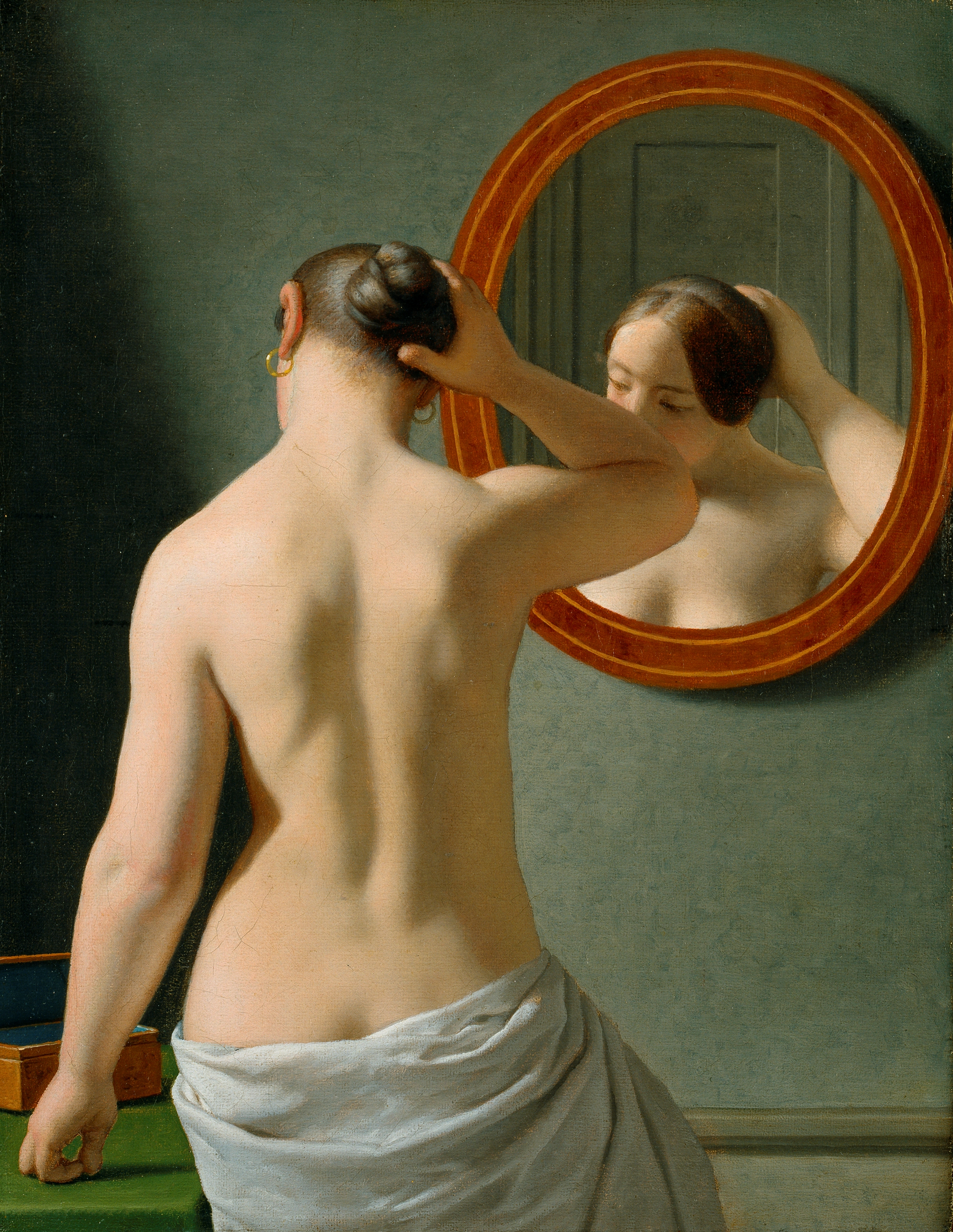
A Nude Woman Doing Her Hair Before a Mirror, 1841

The Admiralty in 1819 had granted him free access to the Copenhagen Naval Station (Holmen), thus giving him occasion to view the many ships – a favorite motive in his paintings. During summer, the sailors would practice swimming here – of course they swam naked. This gave Eckersberg a unique opportunity to watch men in a state of complete undress and to make an artistic evaluation of their physical build. He could thus here select the models whom he needed for his paintings with motives from Greek or Roman antiquity.

His biggest contribution to painting was through his professorship at the Academy. He revitalized teaching by taking students out into the field, where they were challenged to do studies from nature. In this way it was he who introduced direct study from nature into Danish art. He also encouraged his students to develop their individual strengths, thus creating unique styles. He developed an increasing interest in perspective on account of his marine paintings. He wrote a dissertation on the subject called Linear perspective used in the art of painting (Linearperspektiven, anvendt paa Malerkunsten) in 1841, and taught classes on the subject at the Academy. He made a small number of etchings that combine observations of daily life with classical, harmonious principles of composition. This led the way to the characteristic manner in which Golden Age painters portrayed common, everyday life.

There is a self-portrait from 1803, a bust of him by Thorvaldsen from 1816 and a portrait by Marstrand from 1836.

== Pupils ==
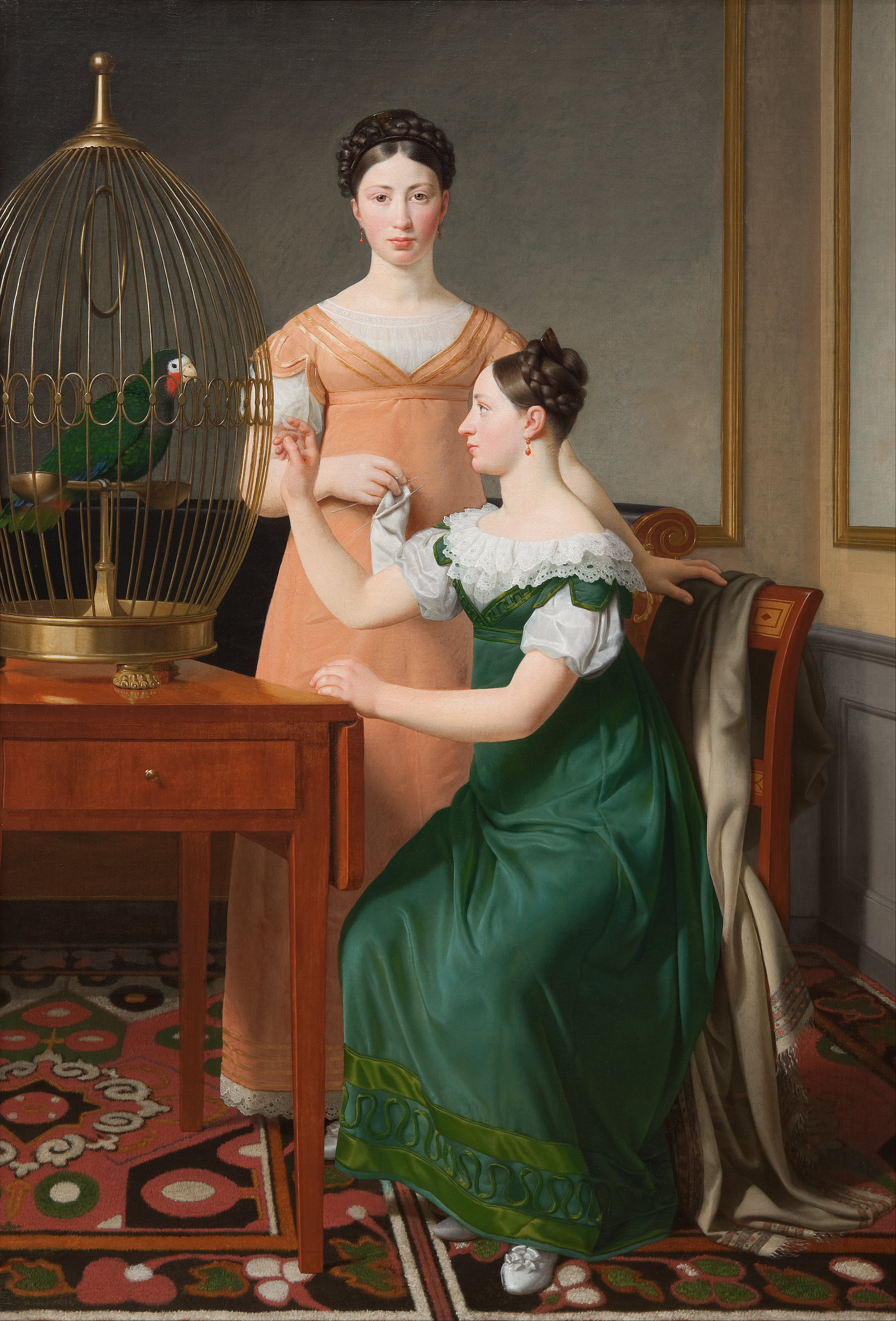
Bella and Hanna. The Eldest Daughters of M. L. Nathanson (1820)

Among his students were:

- Wilhelm Bendz
- Ditlev Blunck
- Carl Dahl
- Christen Dalsgaard
- Anton Dorph
- Dankvart Dreyer
- Heinrich Eddelien
- Julius Exner
- Lorenz Frølich
- Peter Gemzøe
- Johan Vilhelm Gertner
- Hans Jørgen Hammer
- Constantin Hansen
- Frederik Theodor Kloss
- Albert Küchler
- Christen Købke
- Vilhelm Kyhn
- Emanuel Larsen
- Christine Løvmand
- Wilhelm Marstrand
- Anton Melbye
- Adam August Müller
- Emil Normann
- Fritz Petzholdt
- Jørgen Roed
- Martinus Rørbye
- Carl Frederik Sørensen
- Adolph Friedrich Vollmer

== Gallery ==
Paintings by Christoffer Wilhelm Eckersberg

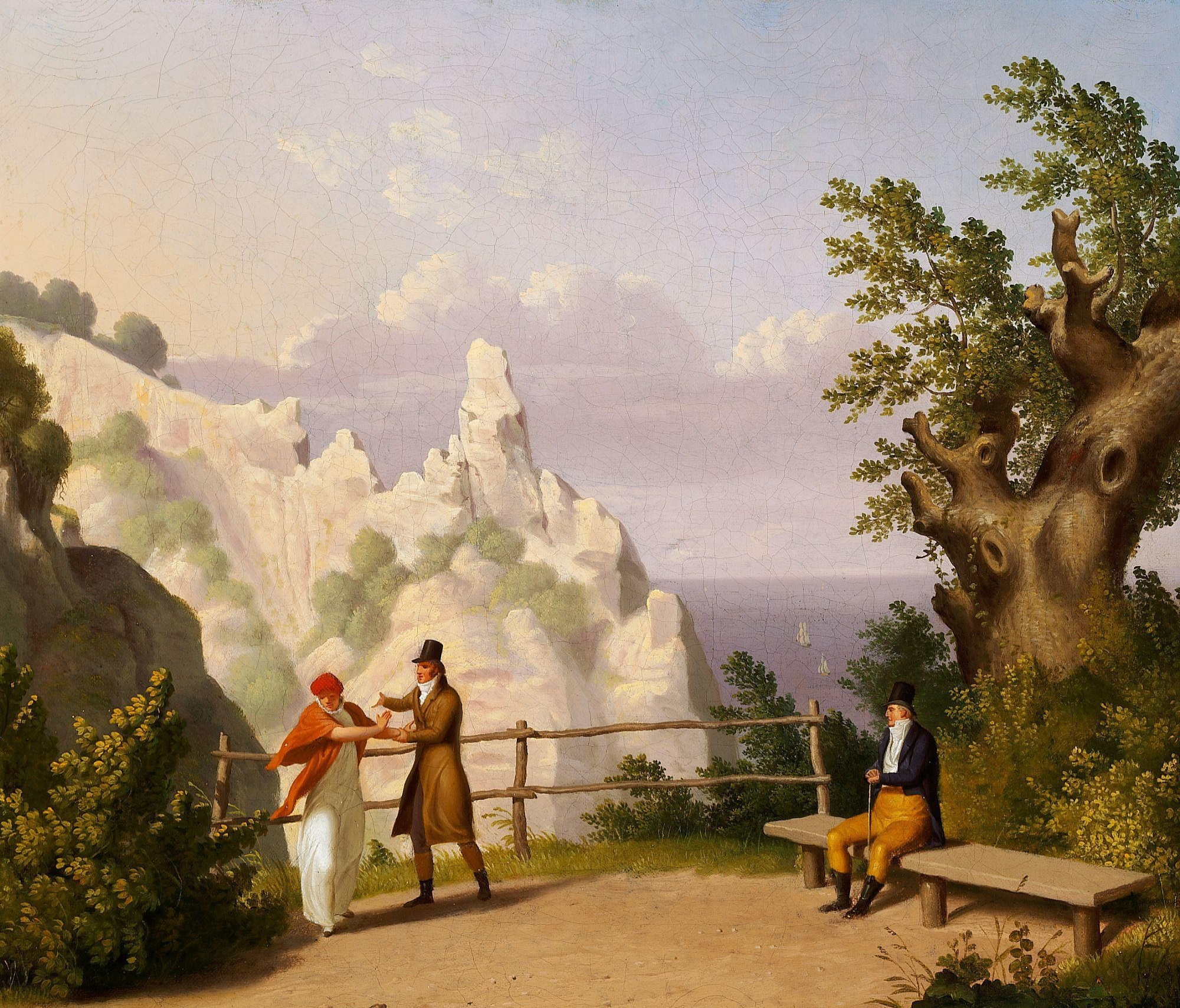
Udsigt af Møns Klint og Sommerspiret (1809)

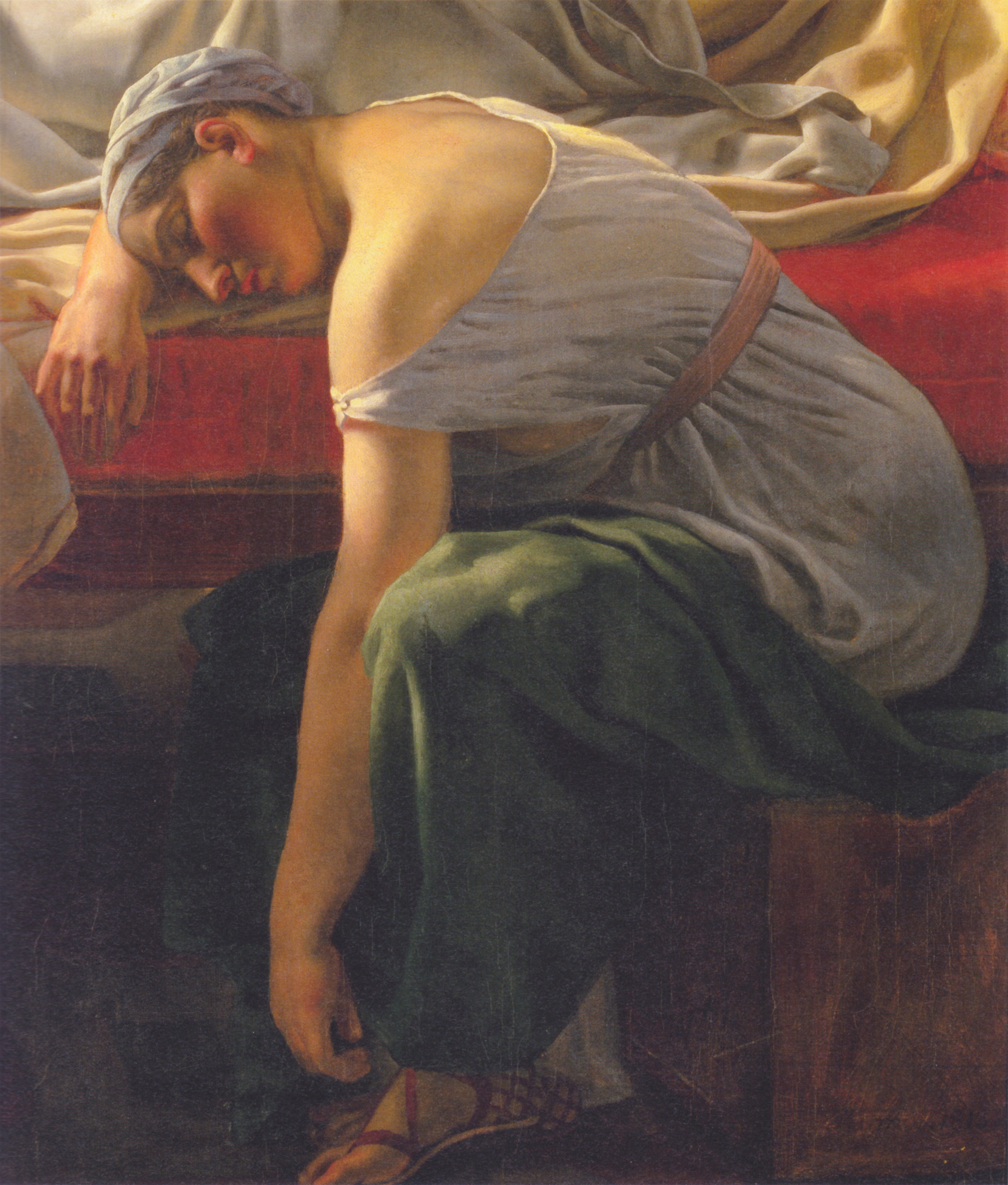
En sovende kvinde i antik dragt (1813)

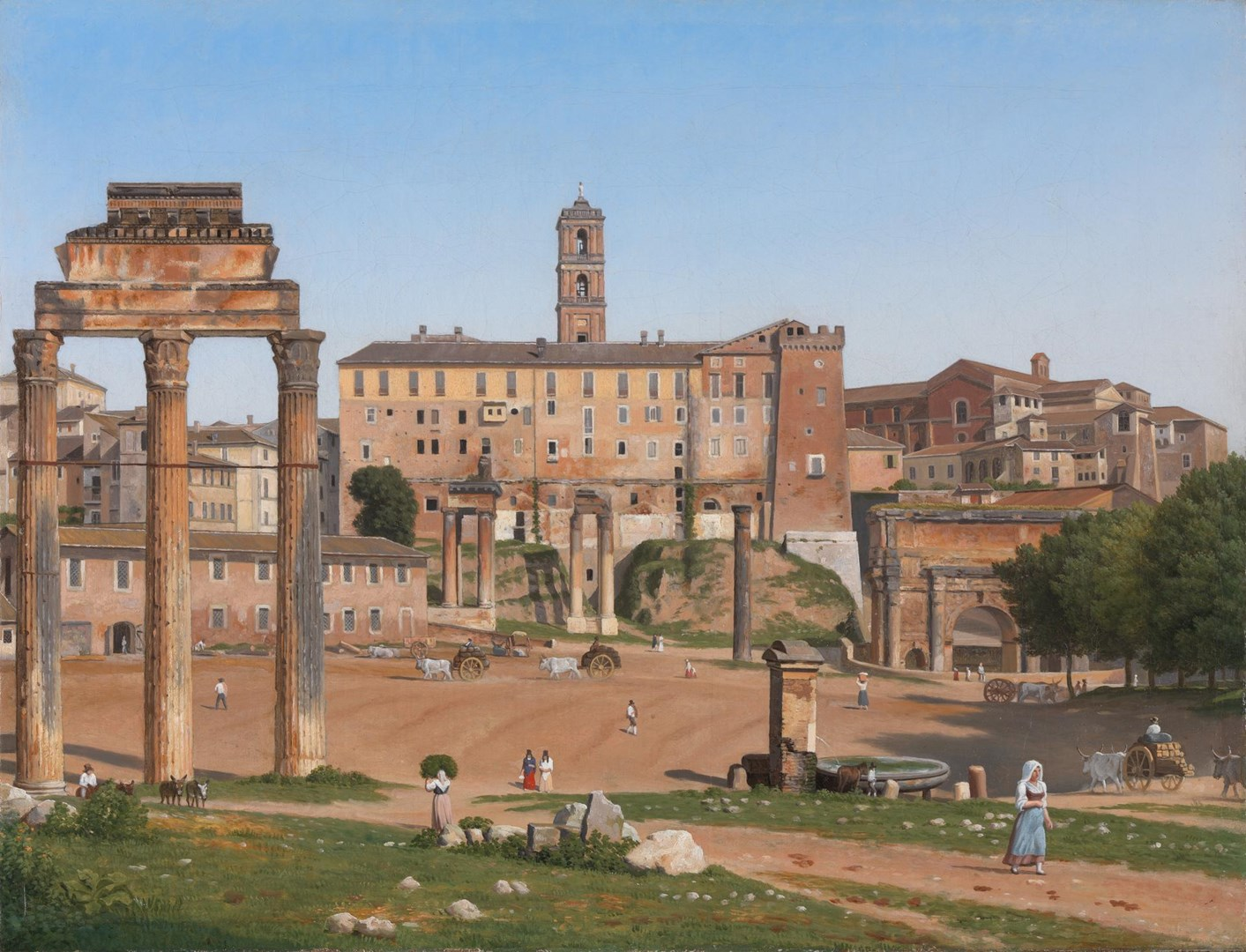
View of the Forum in Rome (1814)

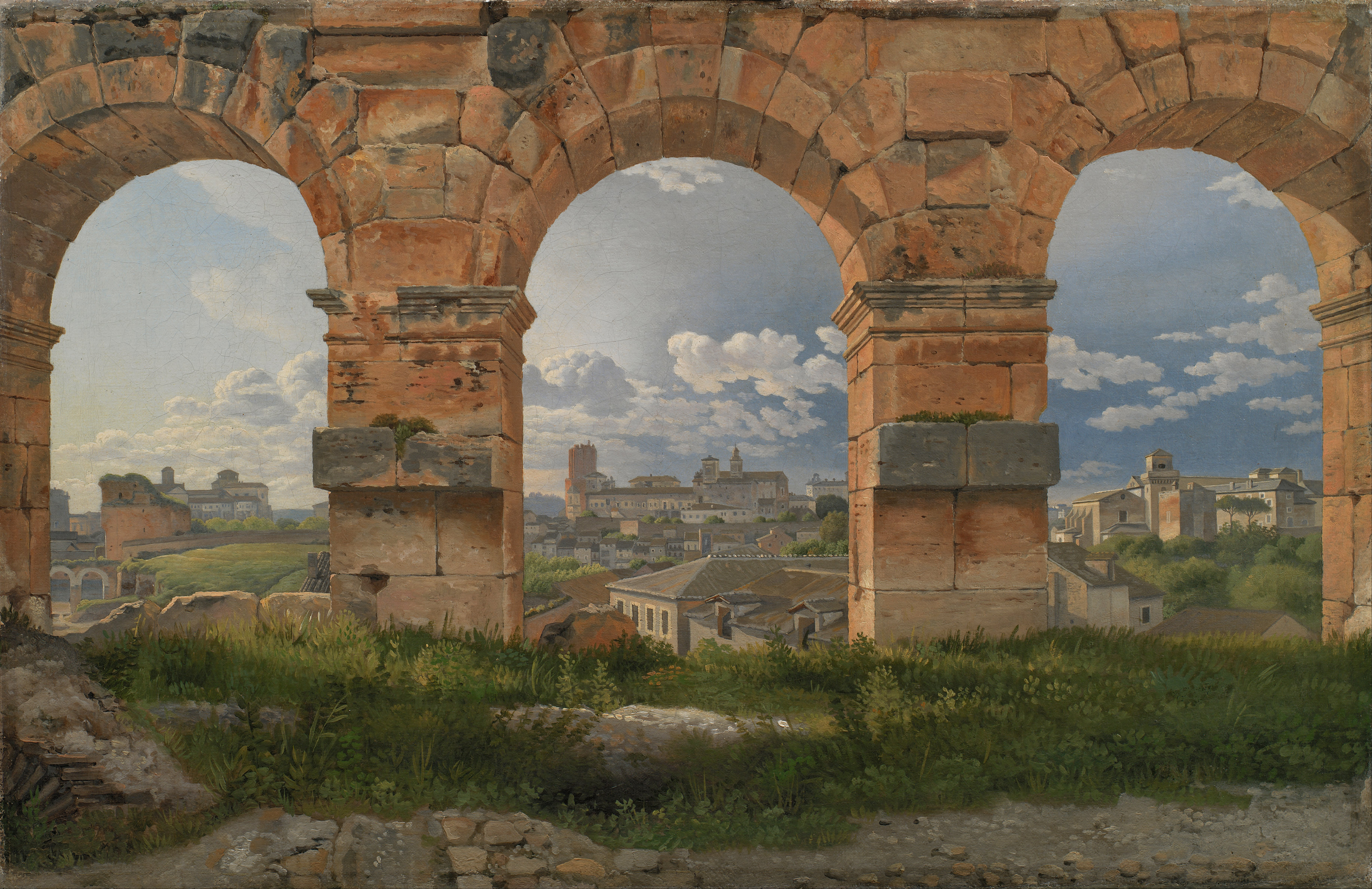
A View through Three of the North-Western Arches of the Third Storey of the Coliseum (c. 1816)

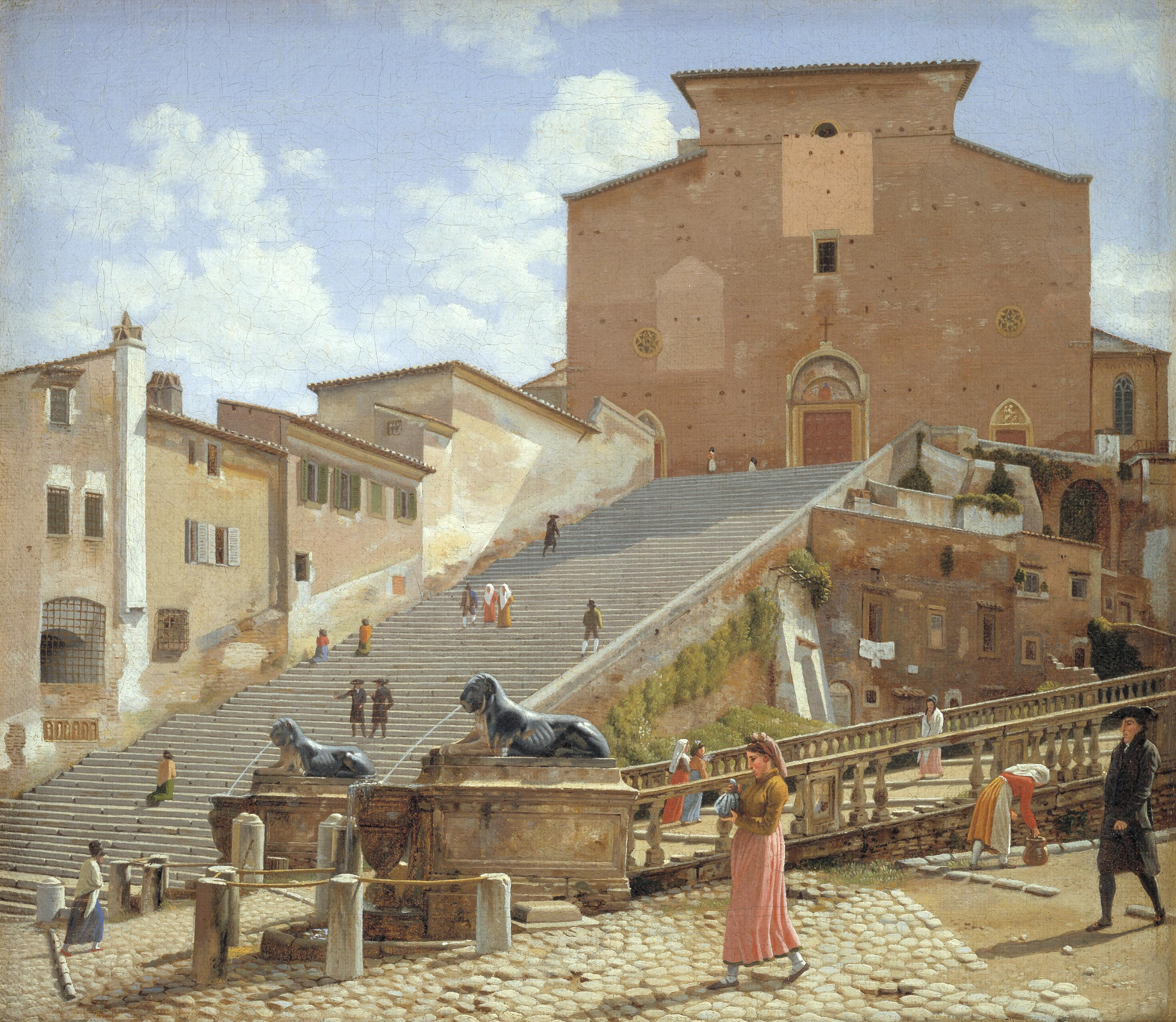
The Marble Steps Leading to the Church of Santa Maria in Aracoeli in Rome (1816)

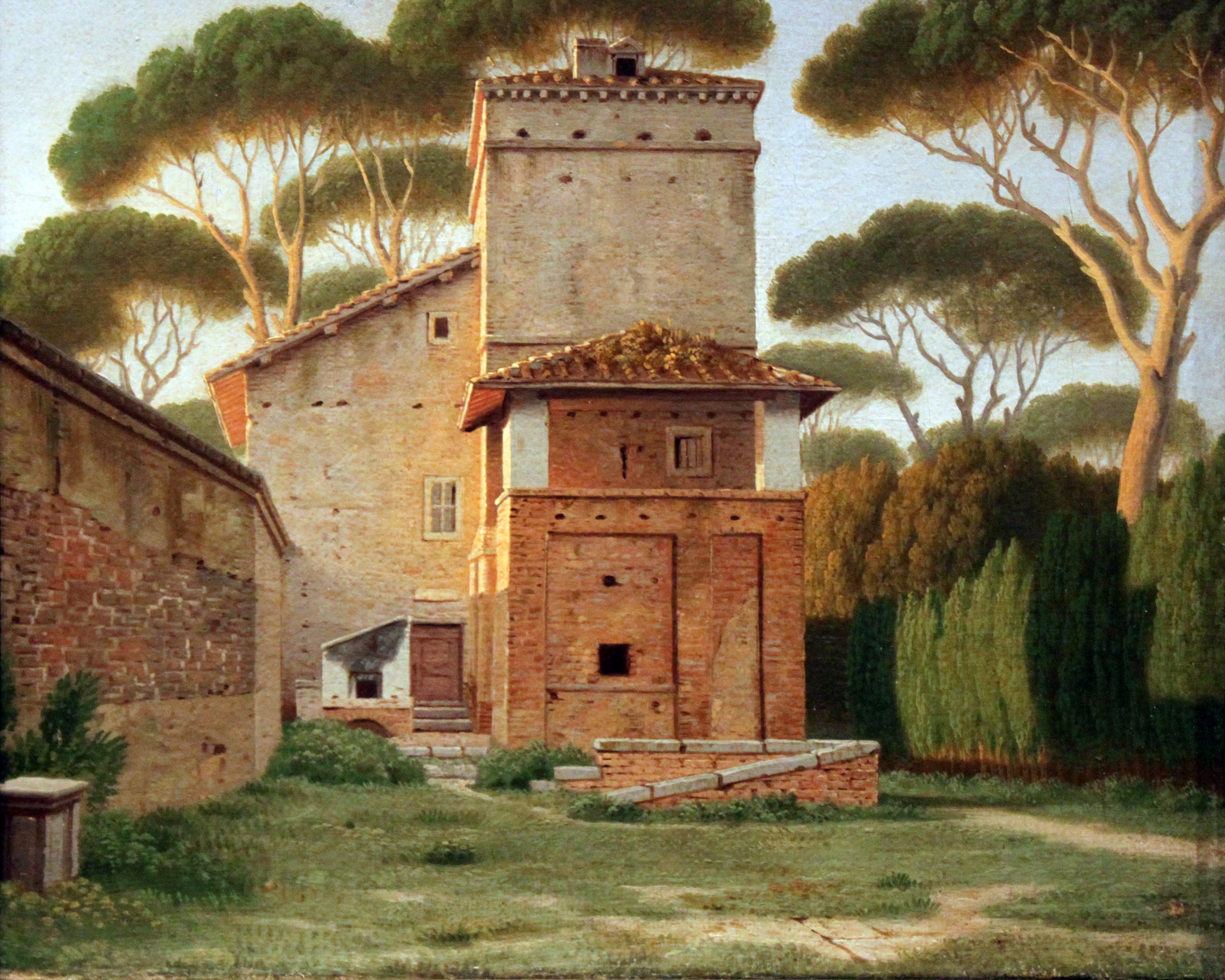
The Gatehouse in the Park of Villa Borghese, Rome, 1816, Hamburger Kunsthalle

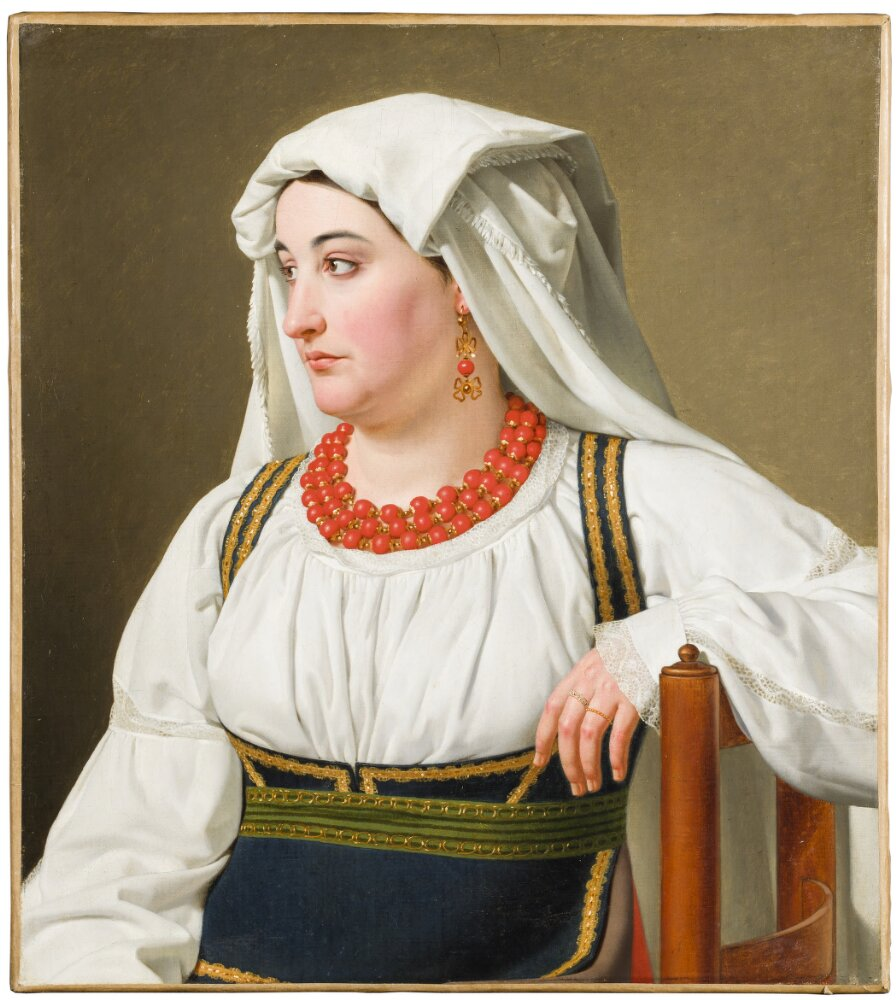
’Una Ciociara’ – Portrait of a Roman Country Girl, 1816, Nationalmuseum, Stockholm

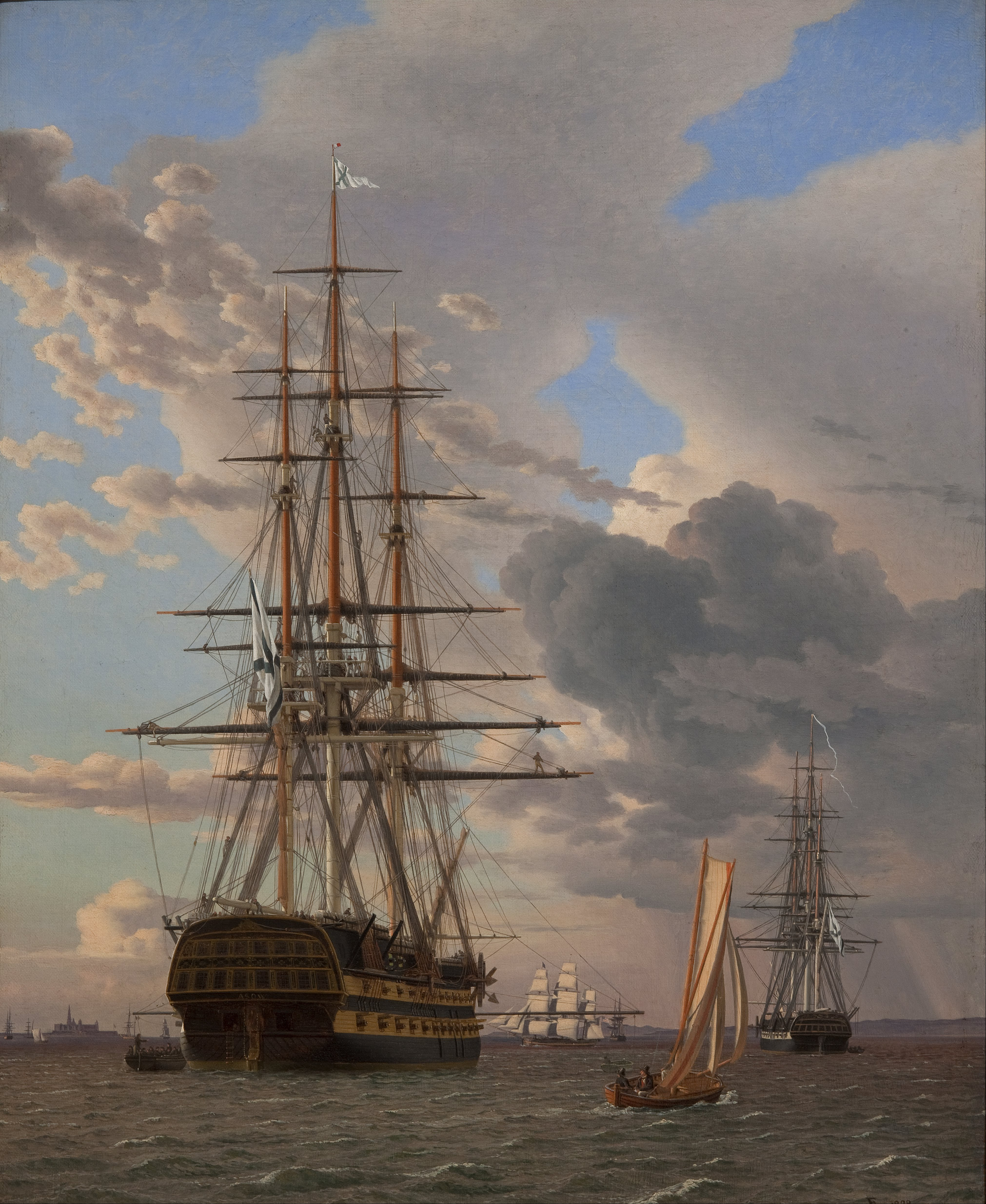
The Russian Ship of the Line "Asow" and a Frigate at Anchor in the Roads of Elsinore (1828)

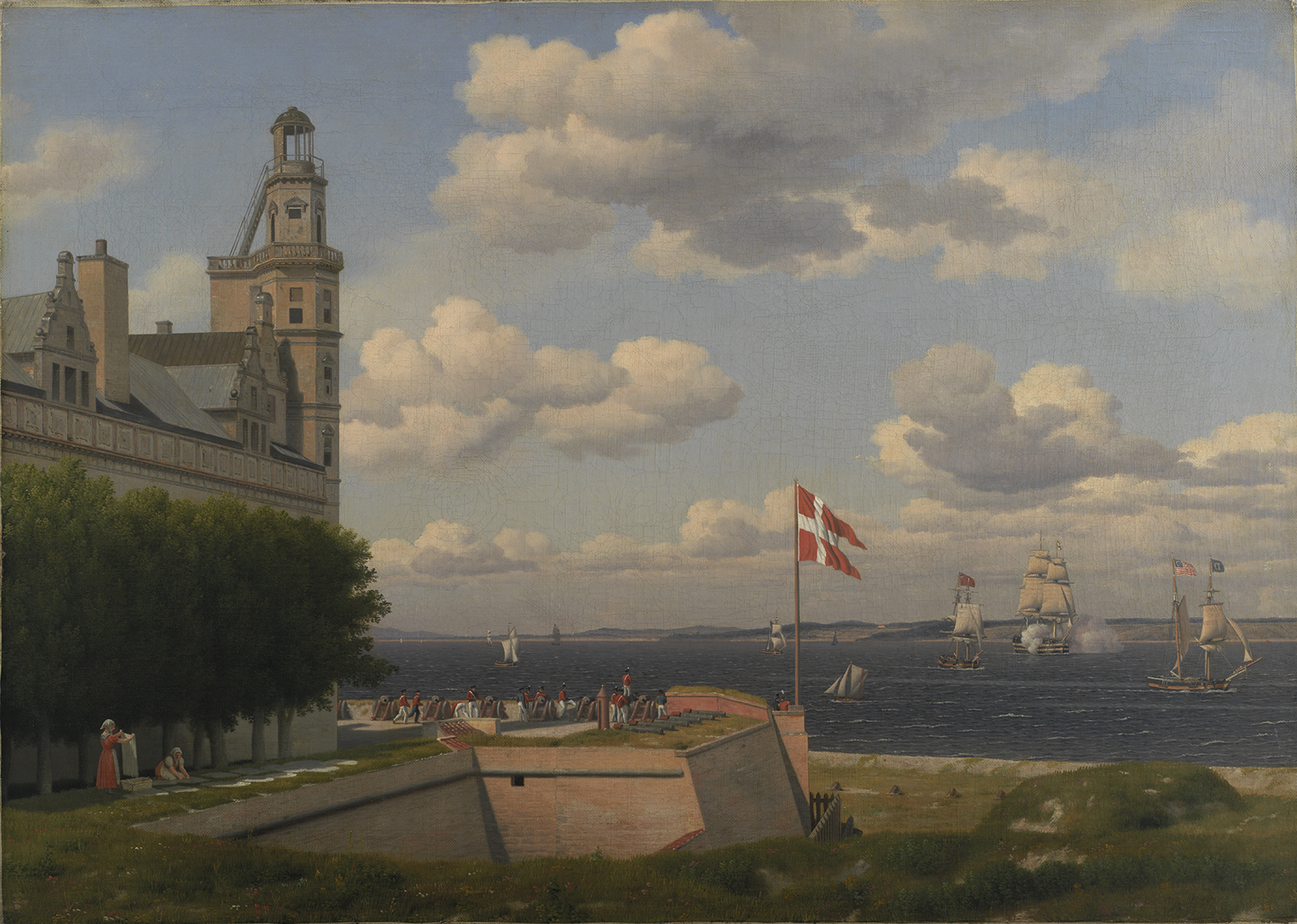
A View towards the Swedish Coast from the Ramparts of Kronborg Castle (1829)

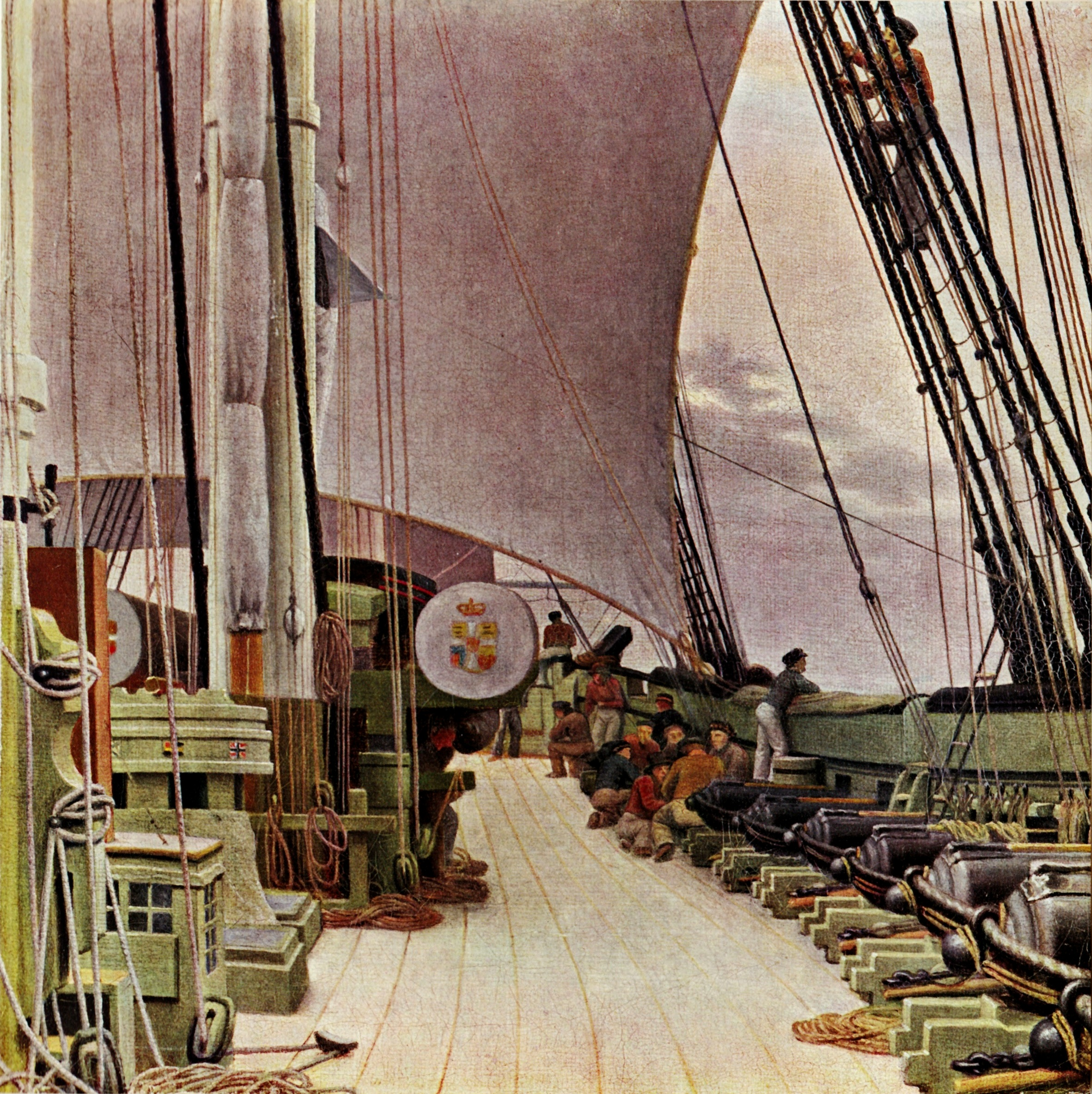
Korvetten Najadens styrbords batteri og dæk (1833)

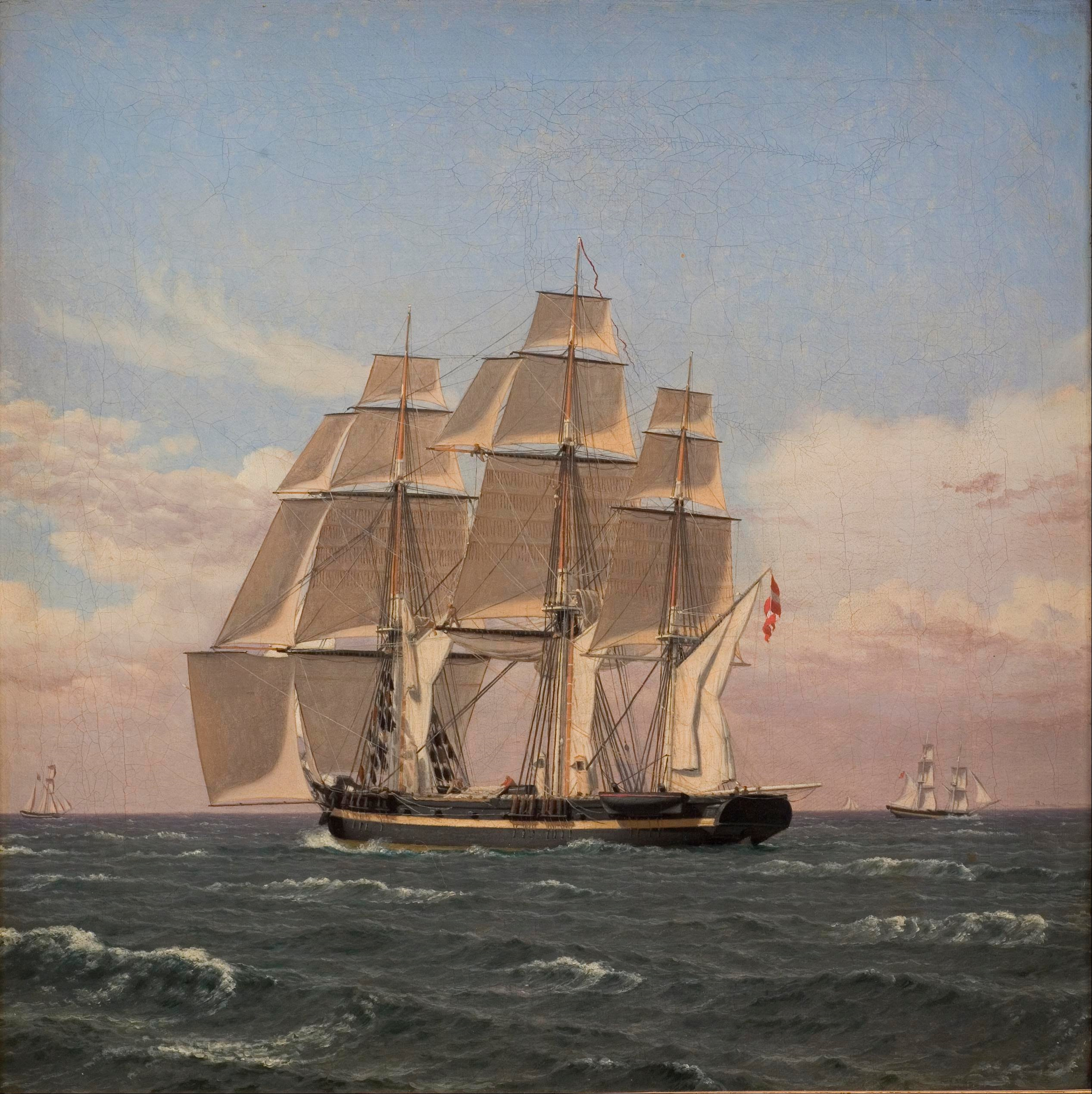
The corvette Najaden under sail (c. 1835)

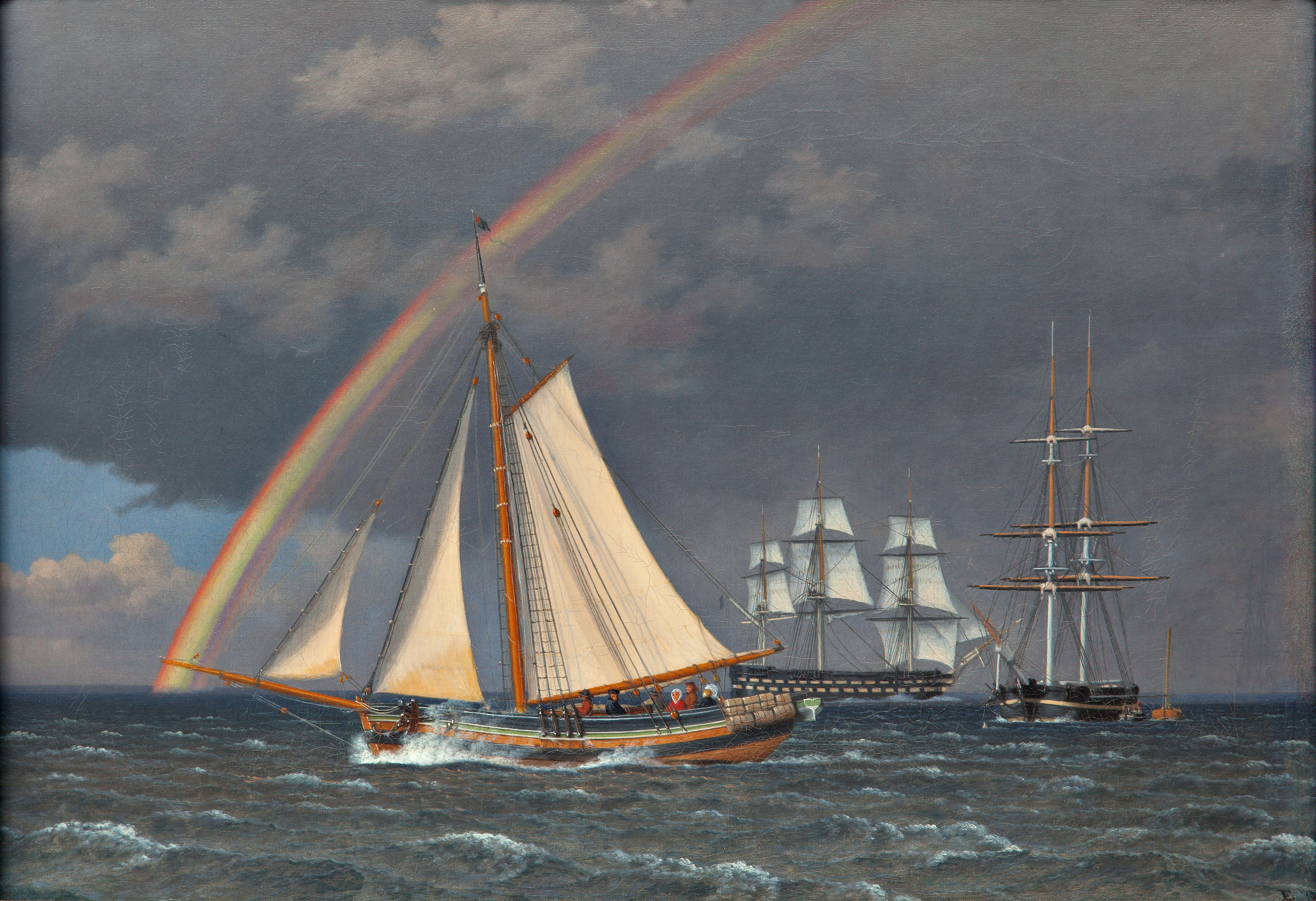
Rainbow at Sea with some cruising Ships (1836)

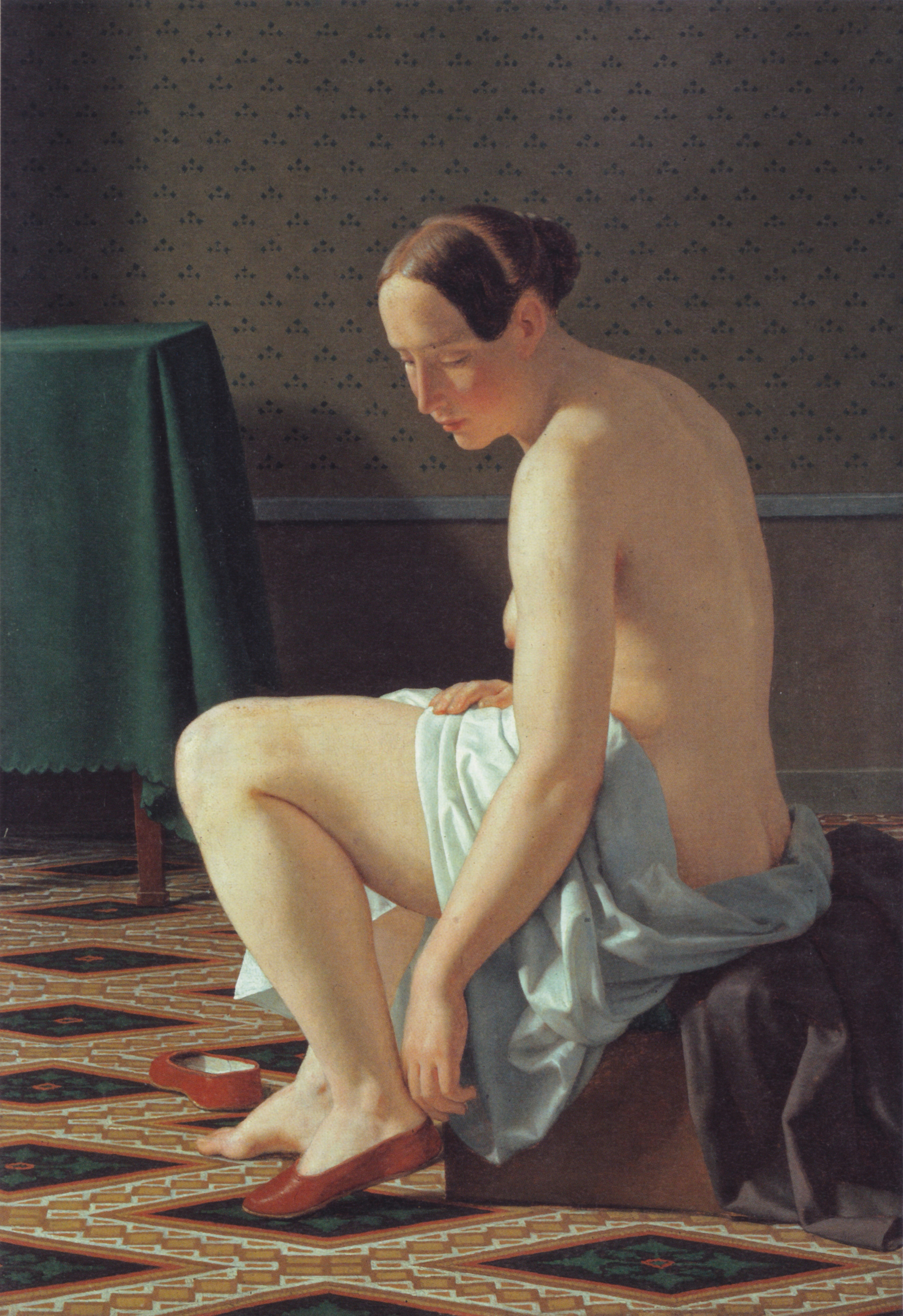
Naked Woman Putting on her Slippers (1843)

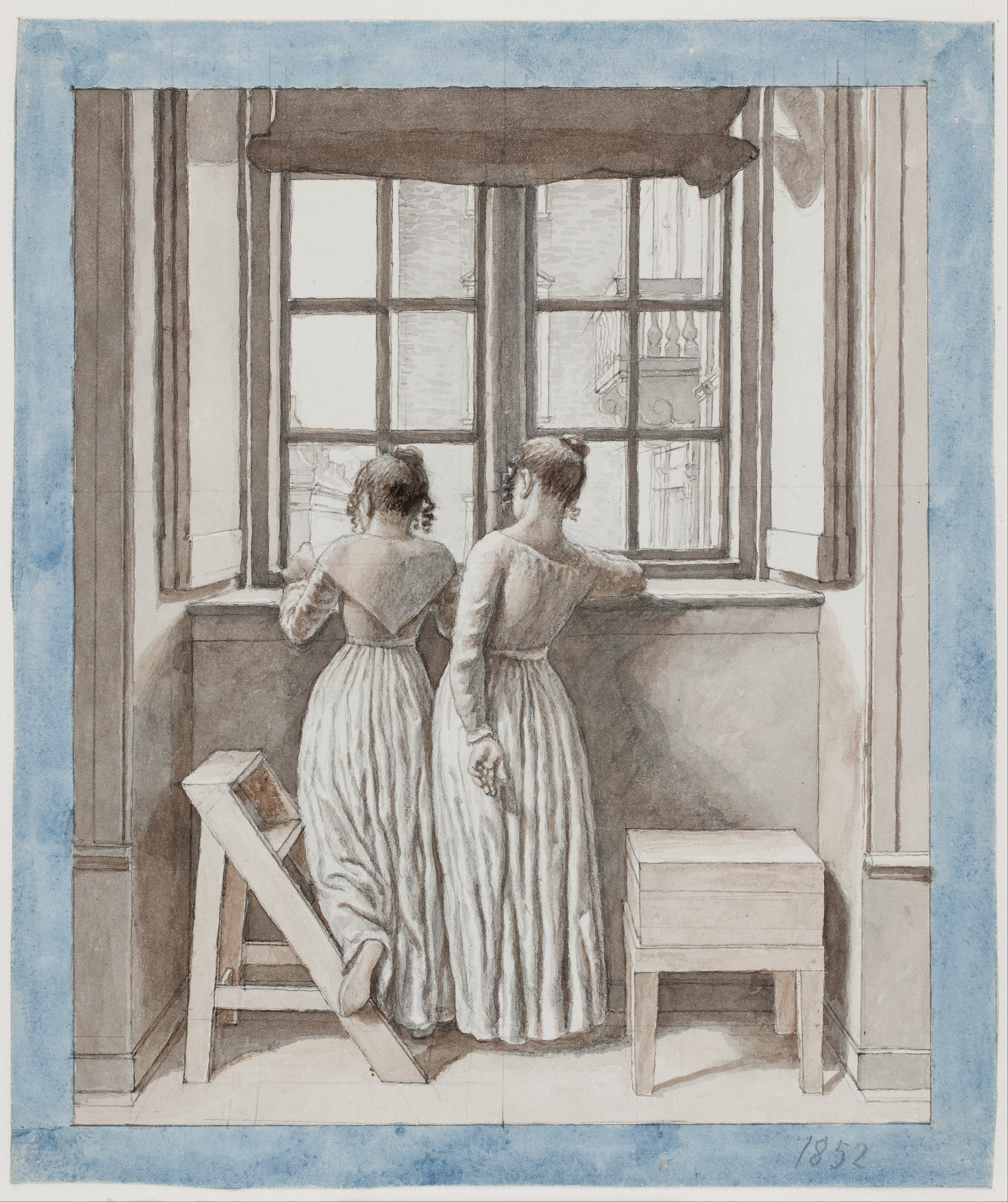
At a Window in the Artist's Studio (1852)

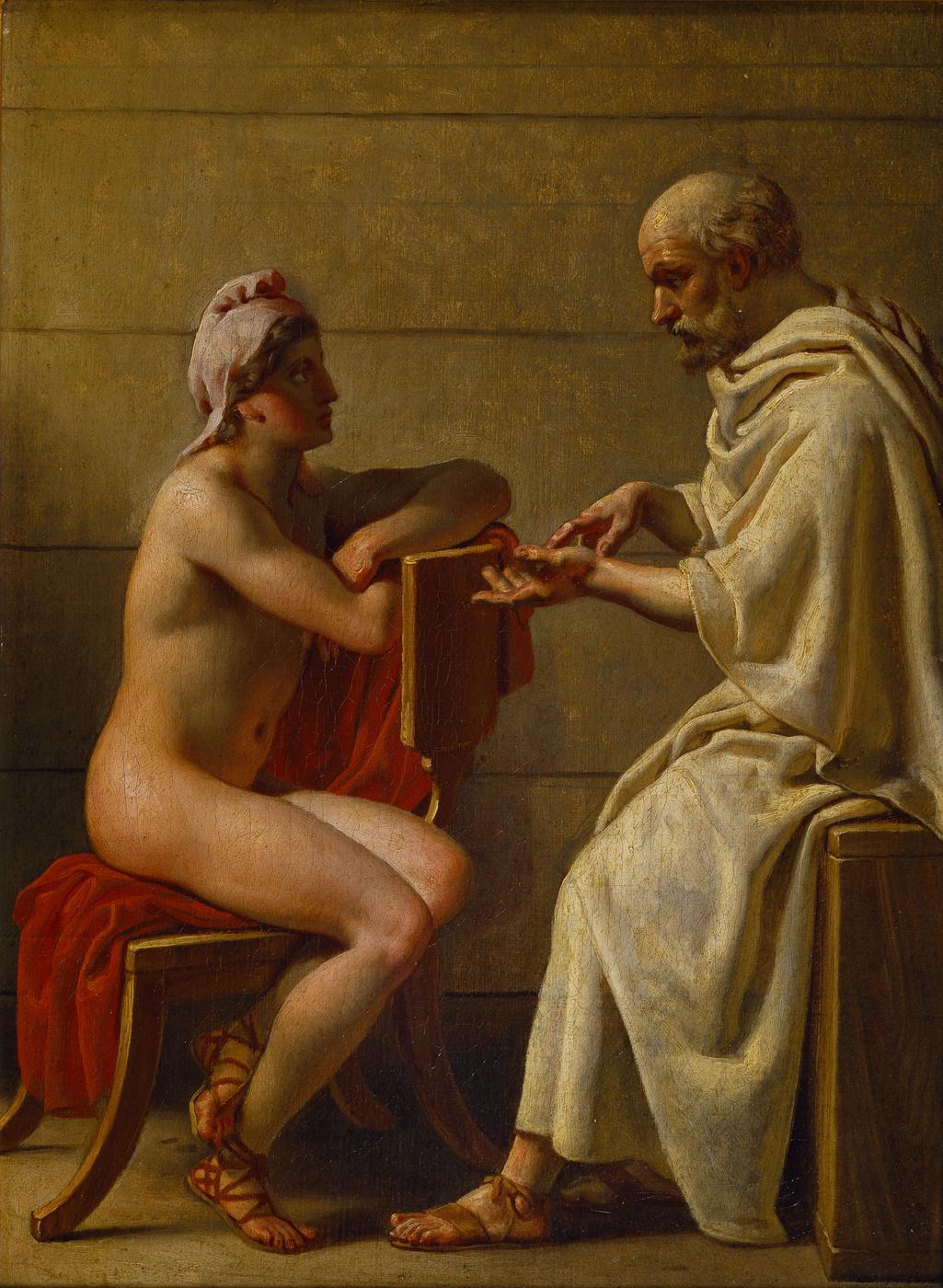
Socrates and Alcibiades

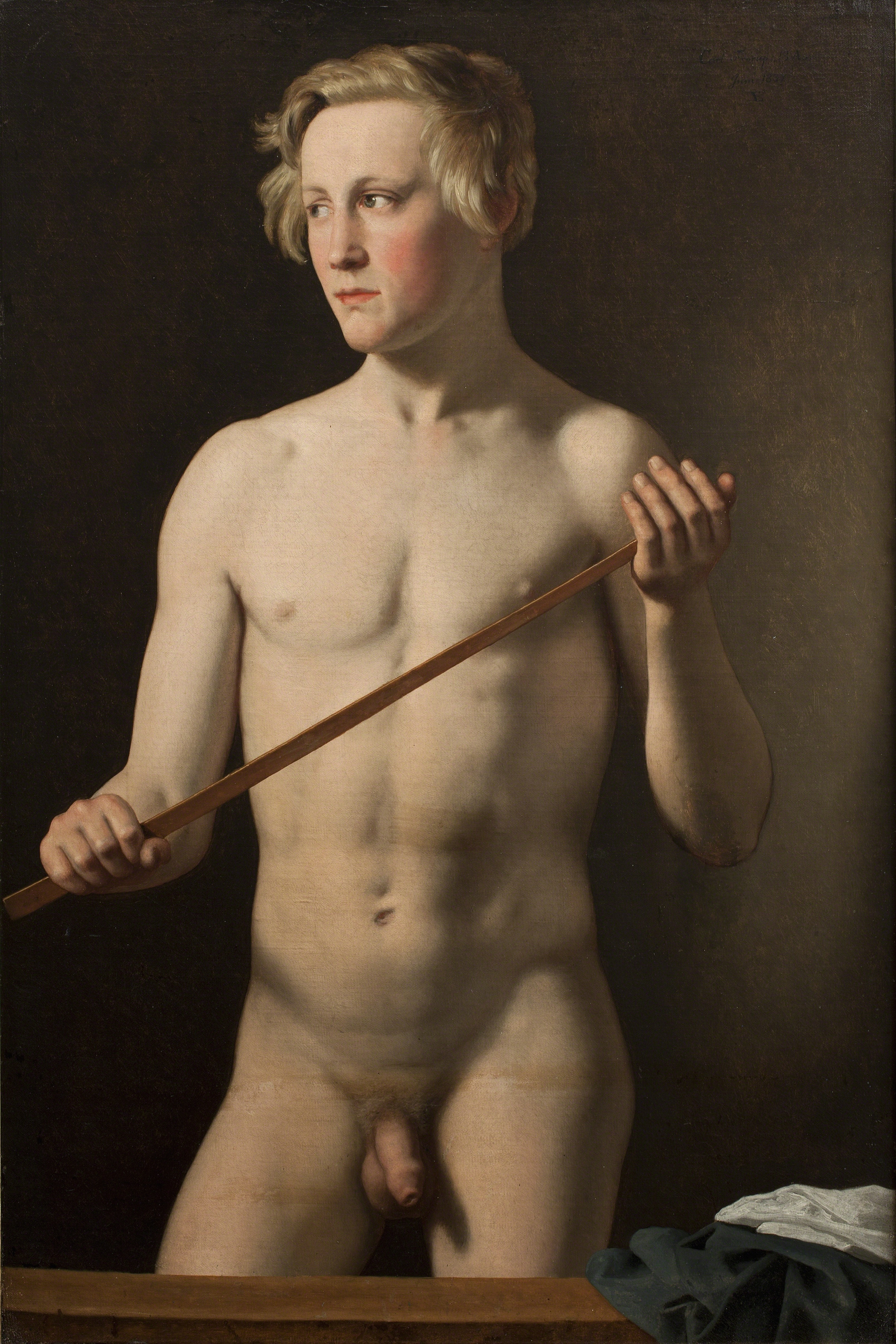
Standing Male Model, Carl Frørup (1837)

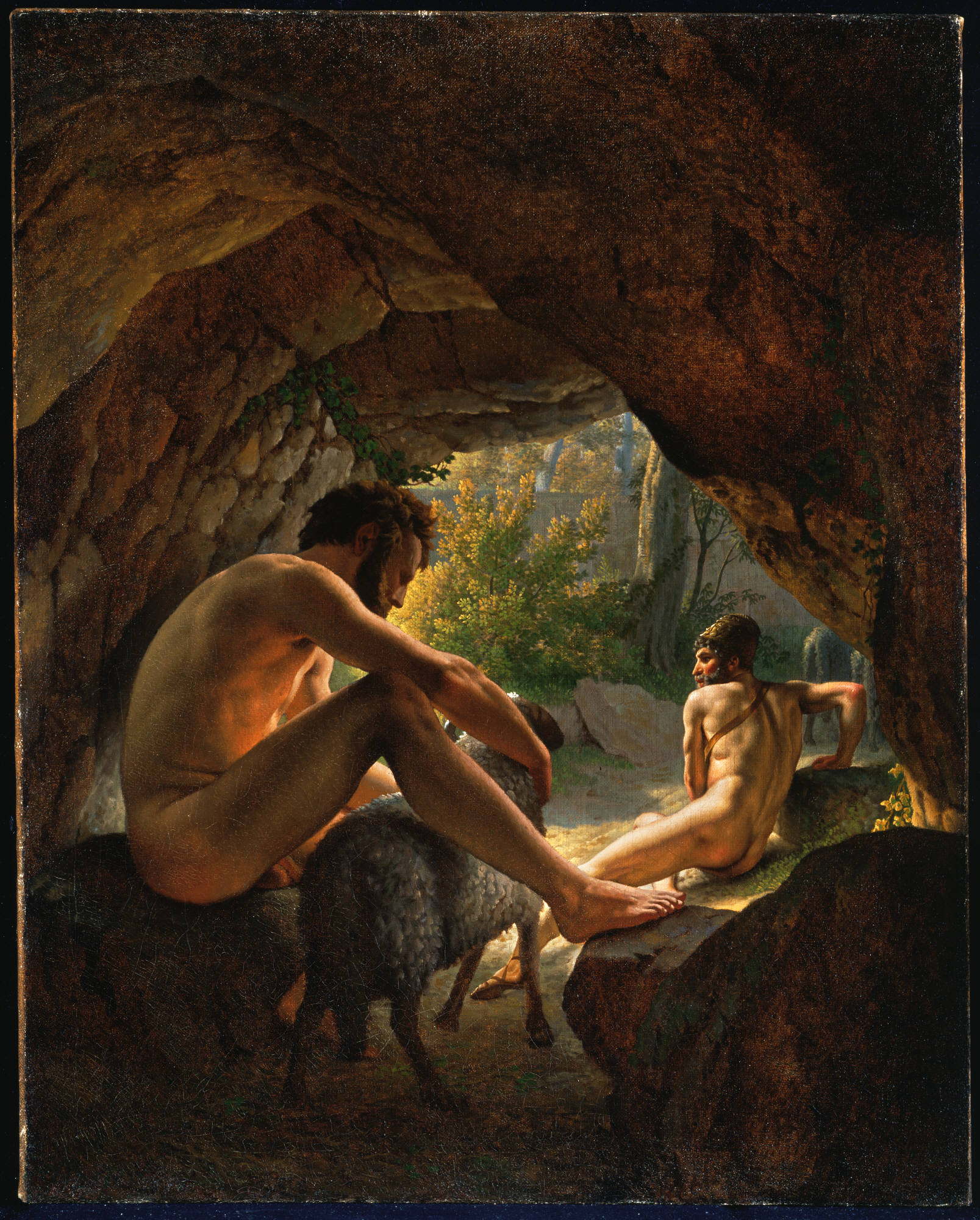
Ulysses fleeing the Cave of Polyphemus (1812)

== See also ==
- Art of Denmark
- List of Danish painters
