= Aastrup =

Aastrup (Åstrup, in the post-1948 Danish orthography) is a Danish place name, which may refer to:

- Aastrup, Falster, a village in eastern Falster
- Aastrup Church, church in Aastrup, Falster
- Aastrup (manor house), in Tølløse

== See also ==
- Åstorp locality southern Sweden, whose old Danish name is Aastrup
