= A Young Artist (Ditlev Blunck) Examining a Sketch in a Mirror =

1826 painting by Wilhelm Bendz

- En ung kunstner (Ditlev Blunck) betragter en skitse i et spejl (Danish)
- Artist: Wilhelm Bendz
- Year: 1826
- Medium: oil on canvas
- Dimensions: 98 cm × 85 cm (39 in × 33 in)
- Location: Statens Museum for Kunst; København
- Website: www.thorvaldsensmuseum.dk/samlingerne/vaerk/B255

A Young Artist (Ditlev Blunck) Examining a Sketch in a Mirror is a painting by Wilhelm Bendz from 1826; it is one of the series of Danish Golden Age portraits of artists.

== Work's title ==
The painting shows young Ditlev Blunck taking a break to examine a sketch for a portrait of George Valtin Sonne painting his brother, engraver Carl Edvard Sonne, by holding it up in front of a mirror to see if the composition works.

== Genesis ==
The painting was executed in 1826 at time when Wilhelm Bendz was preoccupied by artists' new role; no longer craftsmen but instead considered intellectuals, artists in the modern sense of the word. During the 1820s he painted a series of portraits of artists at work. Here the model is Bendz's fellow student, Ditlev Blunck, in the process of painting a portrait of the painter Jørgen Sonne.

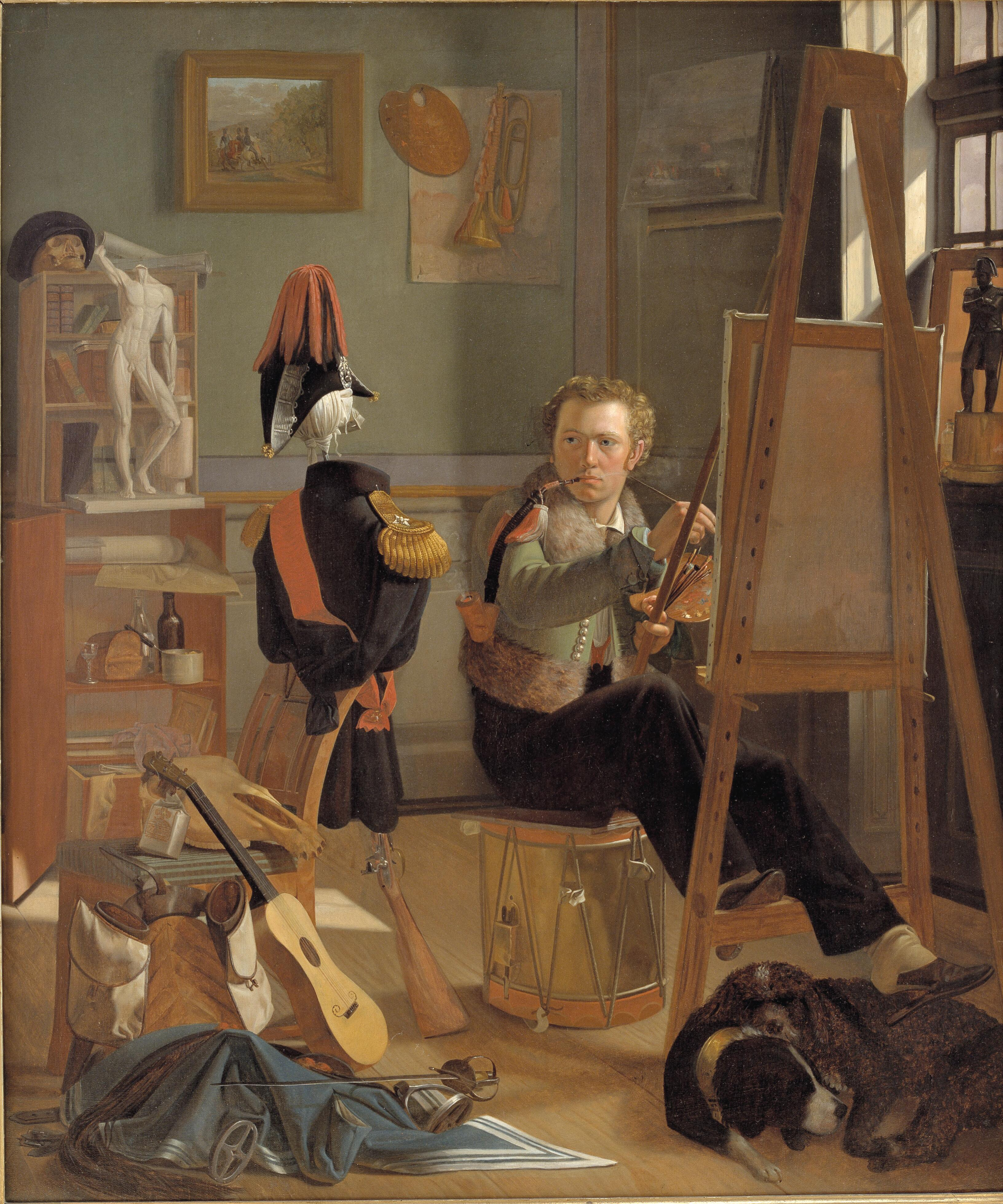
Ditlev Blunck, A bataillemaler, Jørgen Sonne (1801–90) in his study from 1824–1827, Statens Museum for Kunst

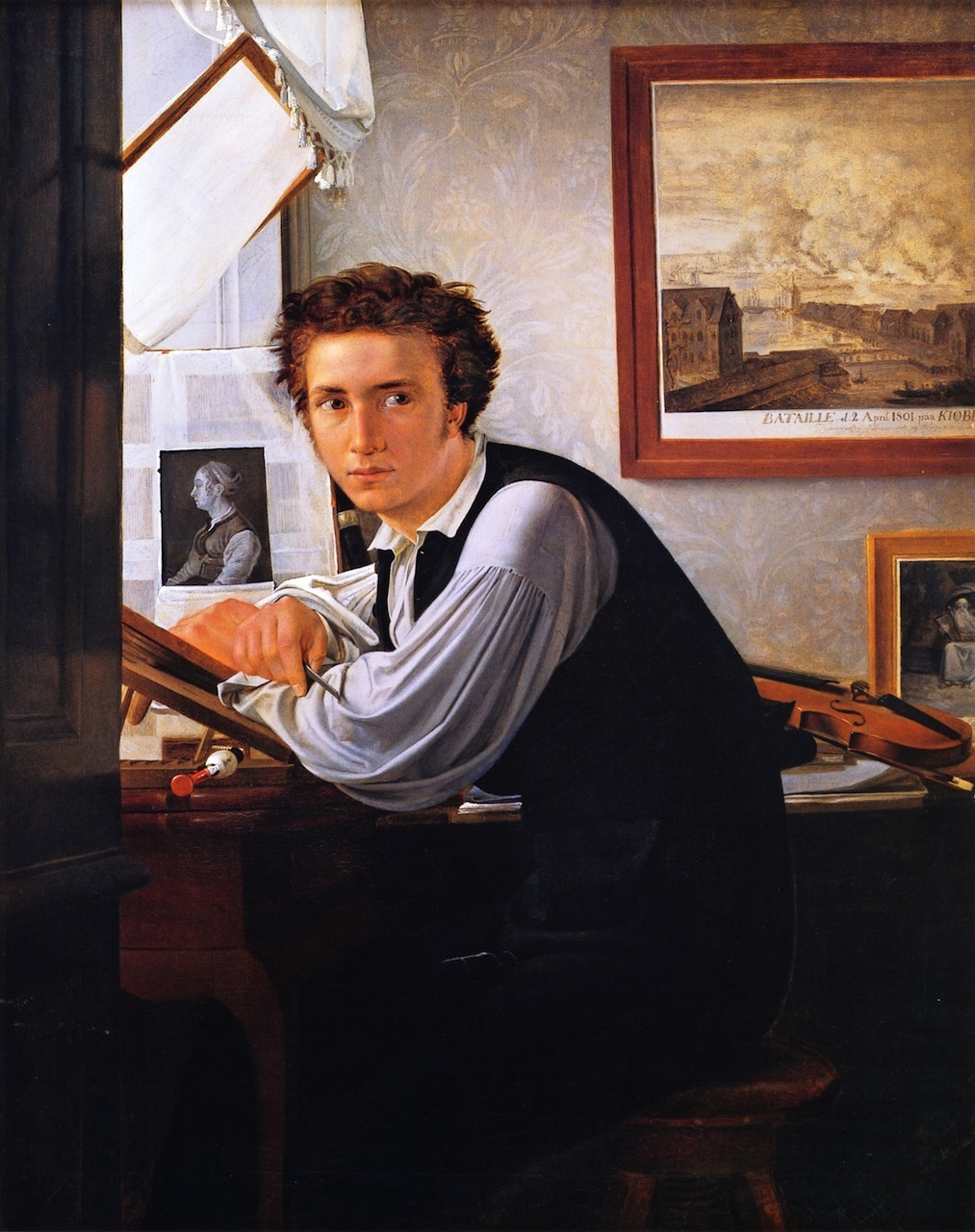
Ditlev Blunck, Portrait of the engraver Carl Edvard Sonne, ca. 1826 Statens Museum for Kunst

== Reason ==
The painting shows a time when painters took themselves seriously as working artists. The image of Blunck standing in a packed room surrounded by his tools, paintbox, palette and easel, skull and sketchpad, signals that his work is serious, and requires thorough study before execution.

== Sources ==
- Klaus P. Mortensen, Spejlinger - litteratur og refleksion, 2000, ISBN 87-90326-28-8
