= Friedrich Bernhard Westphal =

German painter (1803–1844)

Friedrich Bernhard Westphal (5 October 1803, Schleswig – 24 December 1844) was a German-Danish genre painter and illustrator. He was also known by his nickname Fritz Westphal.

== Life ==
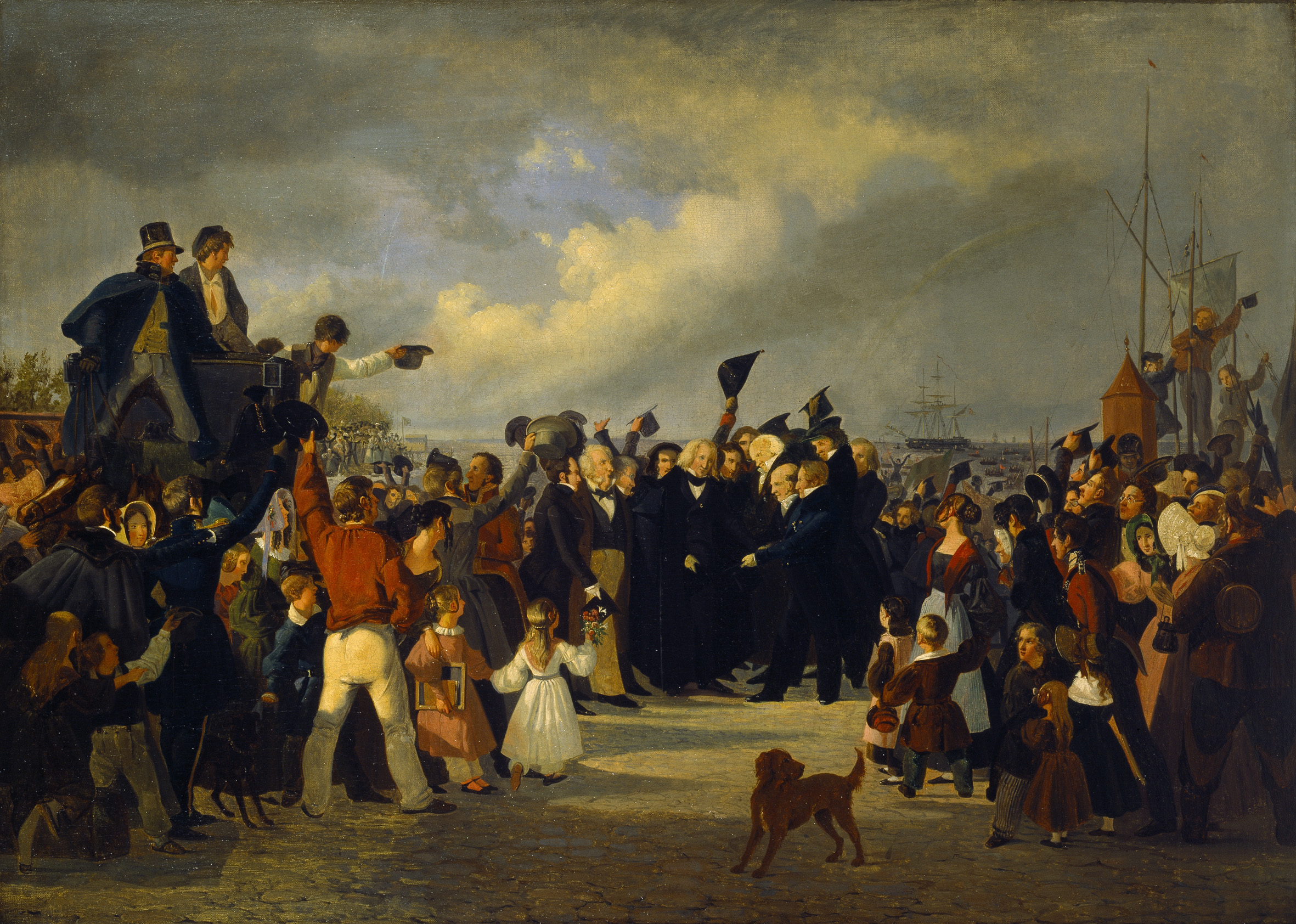
Thorvaldsen's Return to Copenhagen by Westphal.

From 1821 to 1826 he studied at the Royal Danish Academy of Fine Arts in Copenhagen alongside Carl Andreas August Goos, Hermann Wilhelm Bissen, Harro Harring and the Norwegian landscape painter Thomas Fearnley. In 1823 he took Fearnley on a hike through Schleswig. In 1827 he returned to his birthplace and produced a lithograph of J. F. Fritz's 'Four Seasons' sequence in Flensburg.

In 1828 he studied in Munich and from May 1829 alongside Fearnley in Dresden, where he befriended the genre painter Joseph Petzl – both Westphal and Petzl recorded their artistic, romantic and everyday lives in diary-like drawings. Petzl was a major influence on Westphal, who began painting small genre works in the Biedermeier style, sometimes reflecting recent historical events such as the Tyrolese struggle against the Austrian Empire and the Greeks suffering from cholera epidemics. He also painted scenes from Danish contemporary history, such as Bertel Thorvaldsen's return to Copenhagen (1838), Frederick VI's funeral procession (1840) and the anointing of Christian VIII (1840).

Aftershocks of the 1830 French July Revolution in the Kingdom of Saxony caused both Petzl and Westphal to move to Schleswig. In summer 1832 Westphal went on a hike through Norway and from 1837 onwards he began to produce illustrations for books by the Danish writers Christian Winther, Heinrich Hertz and Carsten Hauch. Hoping to travel to Italy, Westphal returned to Copenhagen to compete for the academy's Great Gold Medal, whose prize was a scholarship to go to Rome, but lost the 1837, 1839 and 1841 competitions for it. He then became a "costumier" at the Royal Danish Theatre in Copenhagen. After his death his sister Sophie tried to keep his memory alive by publishing "Genre-Bilder in Bildern und Tönen von Fritz Westphal" in 1852 – it contained 32 of his poems and 10 of his lithographs.

== Works ==
- Portrait of Westphal's master baker, c. 1825. 22 x 18 cm. Stiftung Schleswig-Holsteinische Landesmuseen, Schloss Gottorf, Schleswig.
- Sappho, c. 1828. Stiftung Schleswig-Holsteinische Landesmuseen, Schloss Gottorf, Schleswig.
- Winter, drawing, c. 1828. Städt. Museum Schleswig.
- Self portrait, c. 1828. Städt. Museum Schleswig.
- The Möwenpreis, 1836. 82 x 101,5 cm. Städt. Museum Schleswig.
- David Playing the Harp for Saul, 1837. Royal Danish Academy of Fine Arts
- King Valdemar testing Little Else, 1838. 82 x 97,5 cm. National Gallery of Denmark
- Christ at Emmaus, altarpiece, 1838. Aastrup Church
- Thorvaldsen's Return to Copenhagen in 1838, c. 1840. 71,5 x 100 cm. Thorvaldsen-Museum, Copenhagen.
