= Åbenrå 27 =

18th-century building in Copenhagen

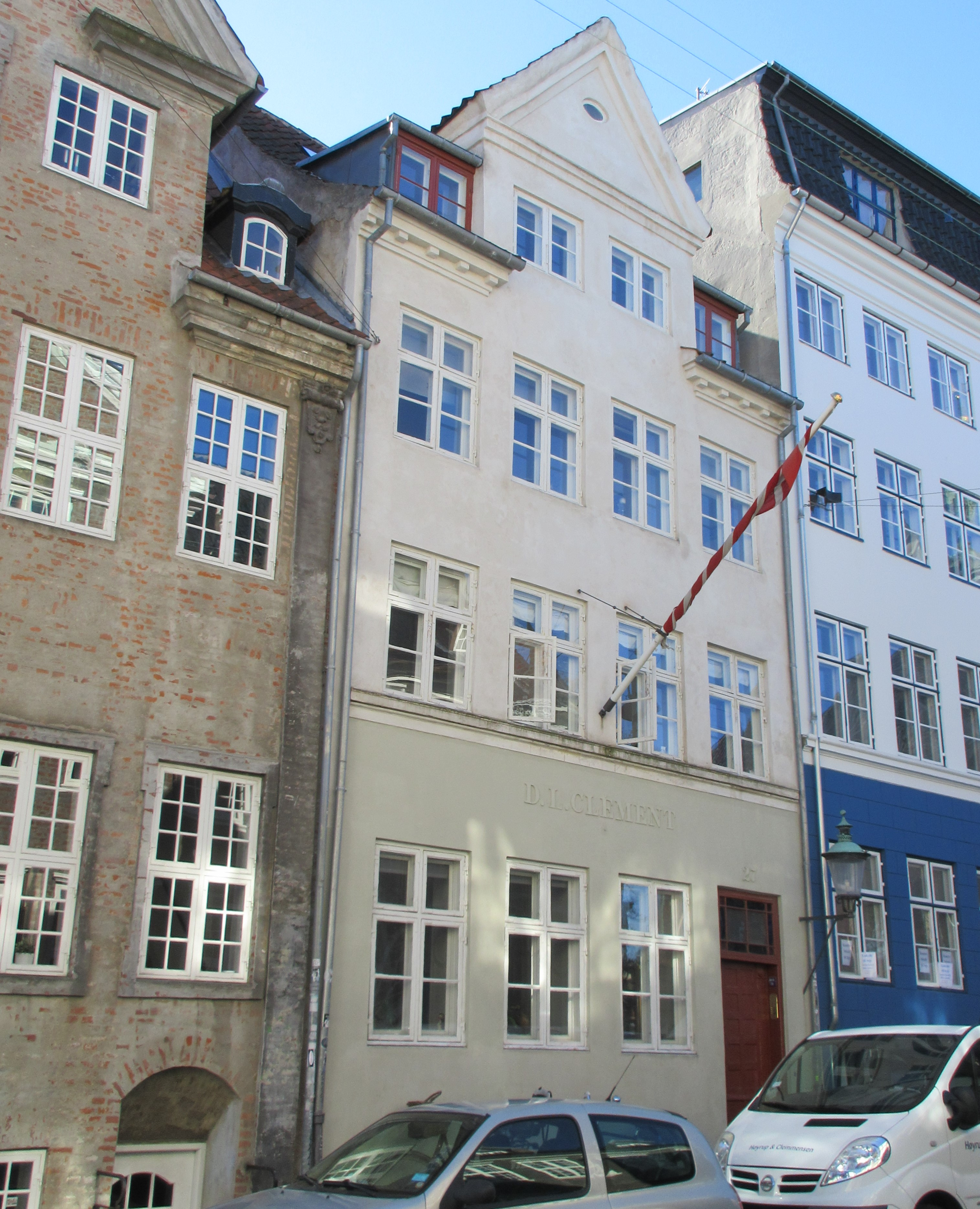
- Interactive map of the Åbenrå 27 area

General information
- Location: Copenhagen, Denmark
- Coordinates: 55°40′42.89″N 12°34′39.32″E
- Completed: 1730s

Åbenrå 27 is an 18th-century town house located in the Old Town of Copenhagen, Denmark. The building was listed in the Danish registry of protected buildings and places in 1959.

== History ==
In 1790. Åbenrå 27 was part of a larger parcel of land numbere 85. It was owned by secretary Johan Seckmand. In 1756, it was owned by a brewer named Lauritz Jørgensen.

The current building on the site was constructed in the 1730s for trabant guard Elias Dordé. In 1806, it was owned by a beer vendor (øltapper) named Morten Nielsen. The painter Vilhelm Bendz was a resident in the building in the years arounde 1829.

The building was from at least 1860 until 1877 owned by book binder D. L. Clement. He served as alderman of the Book Binder's Guild from 1855 and was the following year appointed as university book binder by the University of Copenhagen.

== Architecture ==
The building consists of three storeys and a roof with a two-bay gabled wall dormer. A two-storey, two-bay side wing projects from the rear side of the building. Both the rear side of the main wing and the side wing are constructed with exposed timber framing.

== Today ==
The building contains a single condominium on each floor.
