= Christian Henrik Biering =

Danish pastor and writer (1729–1804)

Christian Henrik Biering (26 August 1729 – 8 September 1804) was a Danish pastor and writer.

== Early life ==
Viering was born in Korup at Odense, the son of chaplain Niels Jørgensen Biering (ca. 1692–1778) and Else Bosdatter (died 1733). He matriculated in 1749 from Odense Gymnasium. In 1752, he qualified as a clergy (attestats). in 1759, he worked as a teacher at Odense School.

== Career ==
In 1760, he was appointed pastor of Aastrup Parish on Falster. In 1767 he purchased Aastrup Church from the crown. In 1773, he became a Master of Theology.

== Works ==
Biering was 15 when he his first poems published, in Danish and Latin. He translated Horat's' letters and wrote moral tales, but was most active as a writer of incidental poems. Songs that he wrote for celebrations among Falster's peasant population remained popular on the island.

== Personal life ==
Biering married Anne Marie Schrøder (1737–67) on 19 June 1761 in Copenhagen's Church of the Holy Ghost. She was the daughter of skipper and later postmaster in Rudkøbing Rasmus Peter Schrøder (1713–86) and Kirsten Bager (1699–1769). After her death, on 14 February 1770 in Stubbekøbing, he married Elisabeth Jæger (1746–1809), daughter of pastor Adolph Jæger (1702–56) and Jørgine Eegh (ca. 1713–93).
