= The Waagepetersen Family (Bendz) =

1830 painting by Wilhelm Bendz

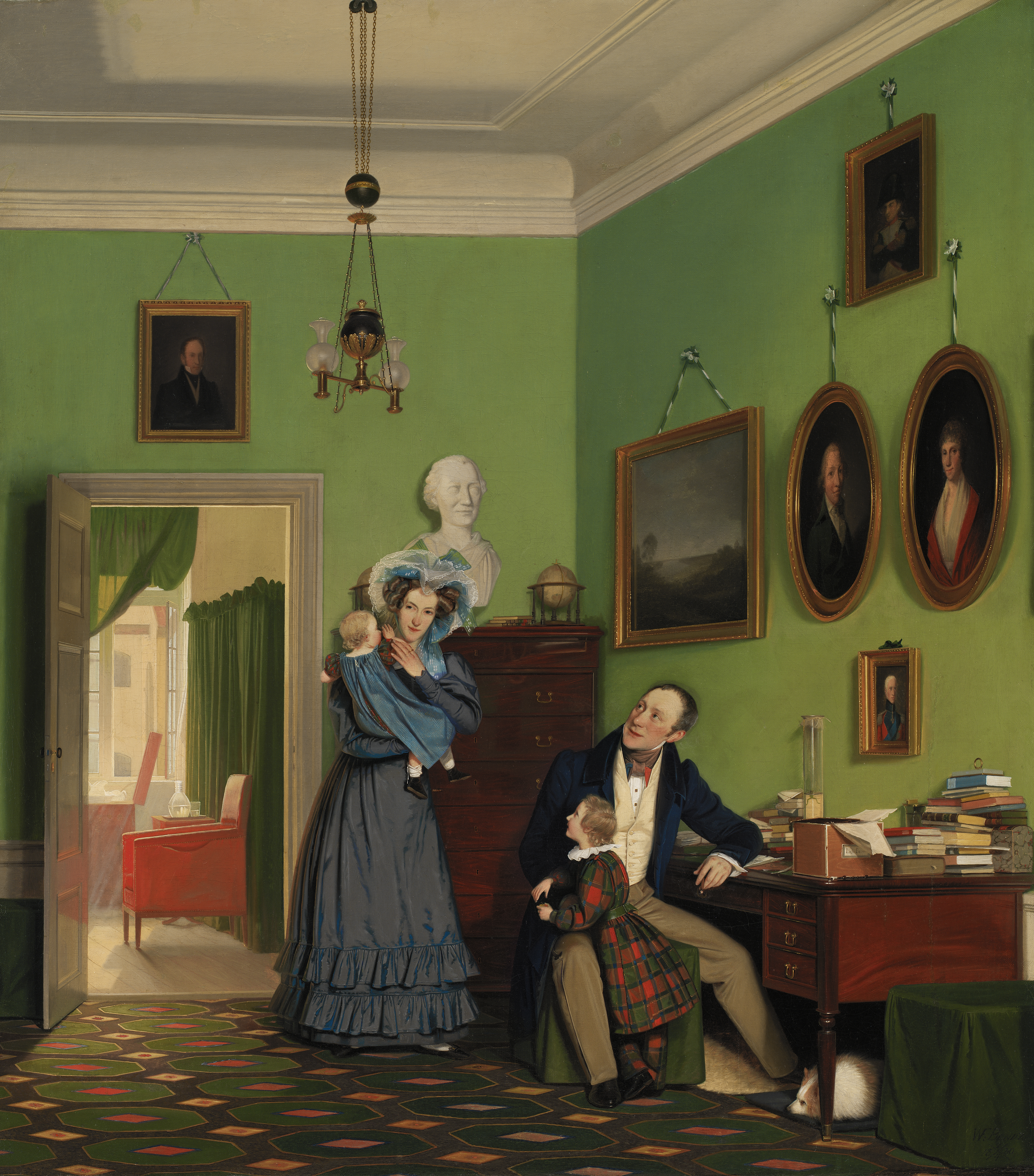
- Artist: Wilhelm Bendz
- Year: 1830
- Medium: oil on canvas
- Dimensions: 99.5 cm × 88.5 cm (39.2 in × 34.8 in)
- Location: Danish National Gallery; Copenhagen

The Waagepetersen Family (Danish: Familien Waagepetersen) is an 1830 oil on canvas group portrait painting by Wilhelm Bendz, depicting the wealthy wine merchant Christian Waagepetersen, his wife Albertine Waagepetersen and two of their children in an everyday scene from their home in the Waagepetersen House on Store Strandstræde in Copenhagen. It is now in the collection of the National Gallery of Denmark.

== History ==
Christian Waagepetersen was keenly interested in art, music and science. He had already bought several paintings from Bendz by the time that the family portrait was commissioned. Bendz completed the painting in early 1830. It is known from Christoffer Wilhelm Eckersberg's diary that Bendz brought it to the annual Charlottenborg Exhibition on 7 April, one week after its official opening. The just 28-year-old Bendz died of typhoid fever in Vicenza in 1832. The position as Waagepetersen's protegé was then taken over by Wilhelm Marstrand, who completed two more family portraits of the Waagepetersen family.

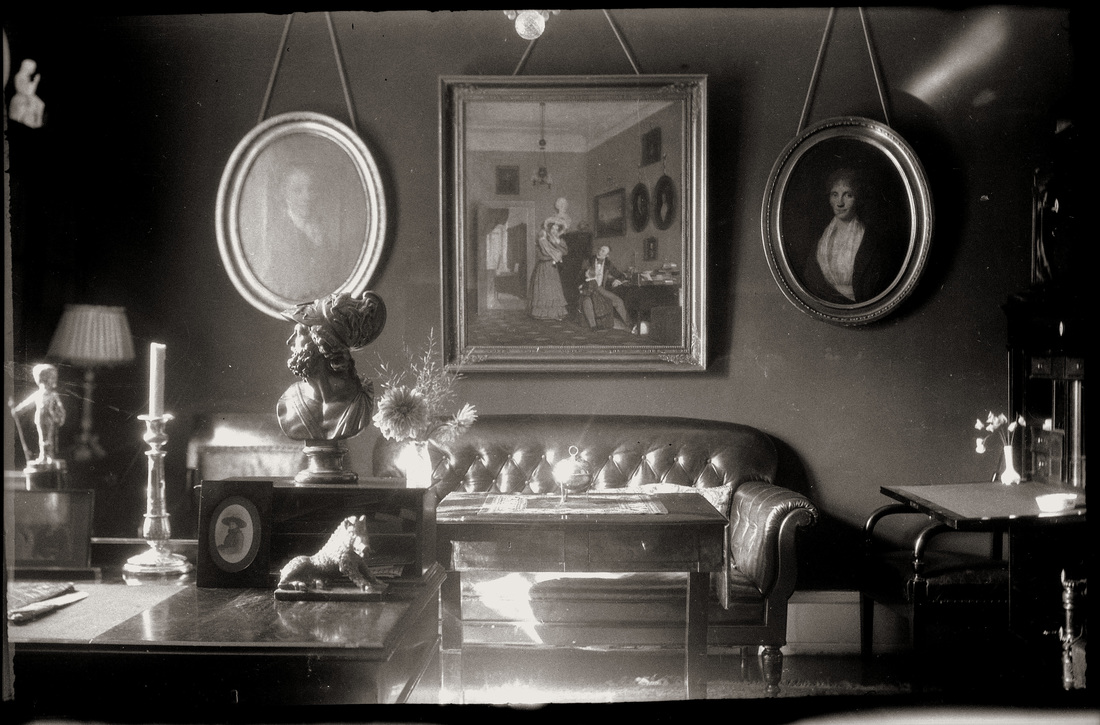
The painting seen on a photograph from Gaston Waagepetersen's home, 1922.

Bendz' portrait of the Waagepetersen family was after Christian Waagepetersen's death passed down to his son Mozart Waagepetersen. The painting was after Mozart Waagepetersen's death passed down to his adopted son (Hermann) Gaston Waagepetersen (1849-1922), whose biological parents were portrait painter Johannes Møller and Alice Tutein. He kept the painting until his death in 1922. It remained in the family for another 75 years. On 2 December 1997, it was sold by Bruun Rasmussen (auction No. 640, Cat. No. 109) to Artemis Group, London. The Danish Commission of Export of Cultural Assets (Kulturværdiudvalget) had prior to the auction sale issued an export ban. In 1998, it was sold to the National Gallery of Denmark.

== Description ==
The painting shows Christian Waagepetersen seated by his desk in his study in the Waagepetersen House- He has just been interrupted in his work by his wife Albertine and two of their children. Albertine is carrying the youngest of the two children, Louise, on her arm. Her slightly older brother Fritz is leaning up against the father's leg. The family's dog is lying under the desk.

The two oval portraits on the wall are Jens Juel's portraits of Waagepetersen's parents Lorentz Petersen (1763-1829) and below them is a portrait of Frederik VI. The frog in the tall glass cylinder on the mahogany desk was used as a sort of primitive barometer: Whenever the frog moved up to the surface it meant fair weather.

== Related works ==
There is a rawing (perspective construction) in the Collection of Prints and Drawings, SMK (KKS1982-391)
