= Aastrup, Falster =

Aastrup
- Village
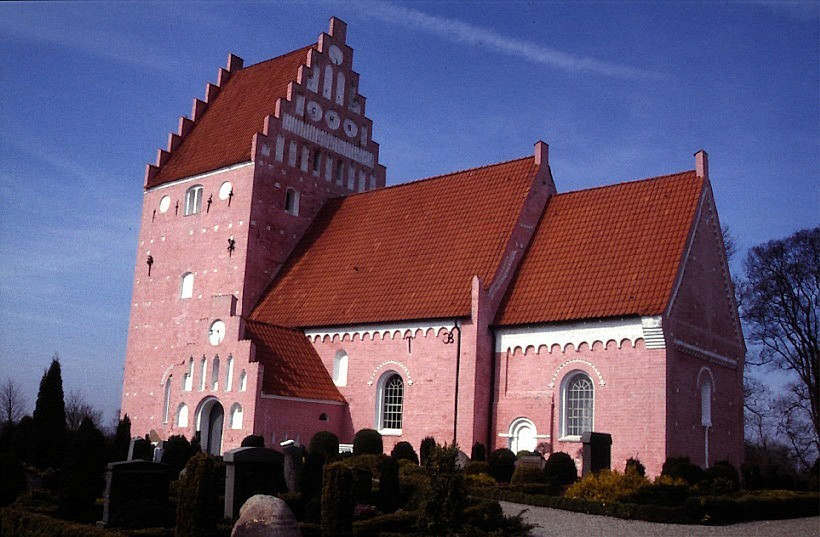
- Aastrup Church

- Location on Falster
- Coordinates: 54°50′57″N 12°05′08″E
- Country: Denmark
- Region: Zealand (Sjælland)
- Municipality: Guldborgsund
- Time zone: UTC+1 (CET)
  - Summer (DST): UTC+2 (CEST)

Aastrup is a little village in eastern Falster, Denmark, located 6 km (3.7 mi) southwest of Stubbekøbing. Aastrup Church, built in the Romanesque style, has frescos from the 13th and 15th century.

The first documented reference to the village dates from 1419 when it was called Østrup.

From 1908 to 1965, the Stubbekøbing–Nykøbing railway (Stubbekøbingbanen) went through Aastrup, 4.2 km from Stubbekøbing, where there was a station with a ticket office and a siding.
