= Wilhelm Bendz =

Danish artist (1804–1832)

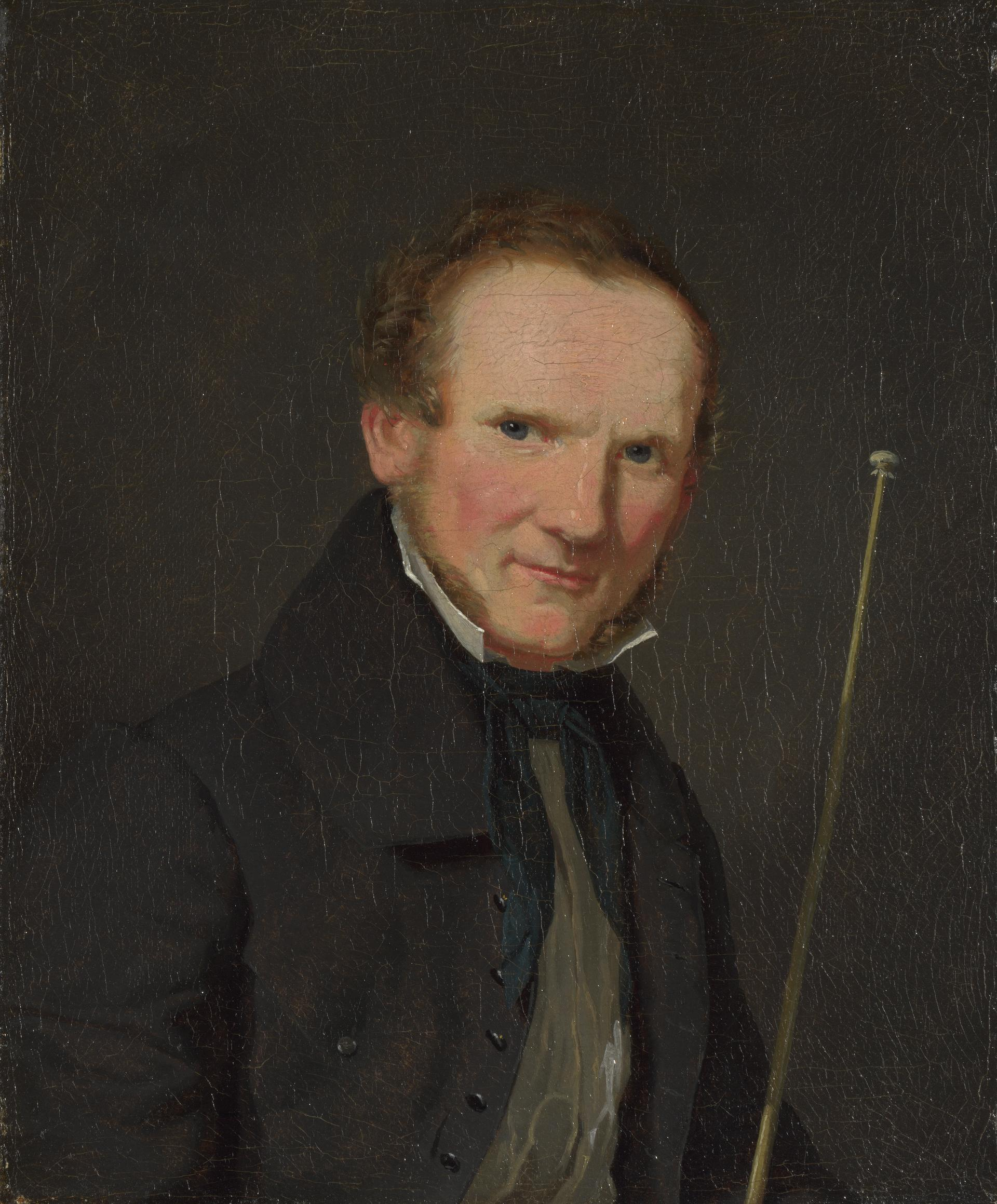
- Christen Købke, Portrait of Wilhelm Bendz, oil on canvas, c. 1830
- Born: 20 March 1804; Odense, Denmark
- Died: 14 November 1832 (aged 28); Vicenza, Austrian Empire
- Education: Royal Danish Academy of Fine Arts
- Known for: Painting
- Movement: Danish Golden Age

Wilhelm Ferdinand Bendz (20 March 1804 – 14 November 1832) was a Danish painter mainly known for genre works and portraits which often portray his artist colleagues and their daily lives. He was one of the most talented artists in the successful generation of painters who studied under Christoffer Wilhelm Eckersberg but died early and has therefore left a relatively small oeuvre.

== Biography ==
A Young Artist (Ditlev Blunck) Examining a Sketch in a Mirror, 1826

=== Early life and education ===
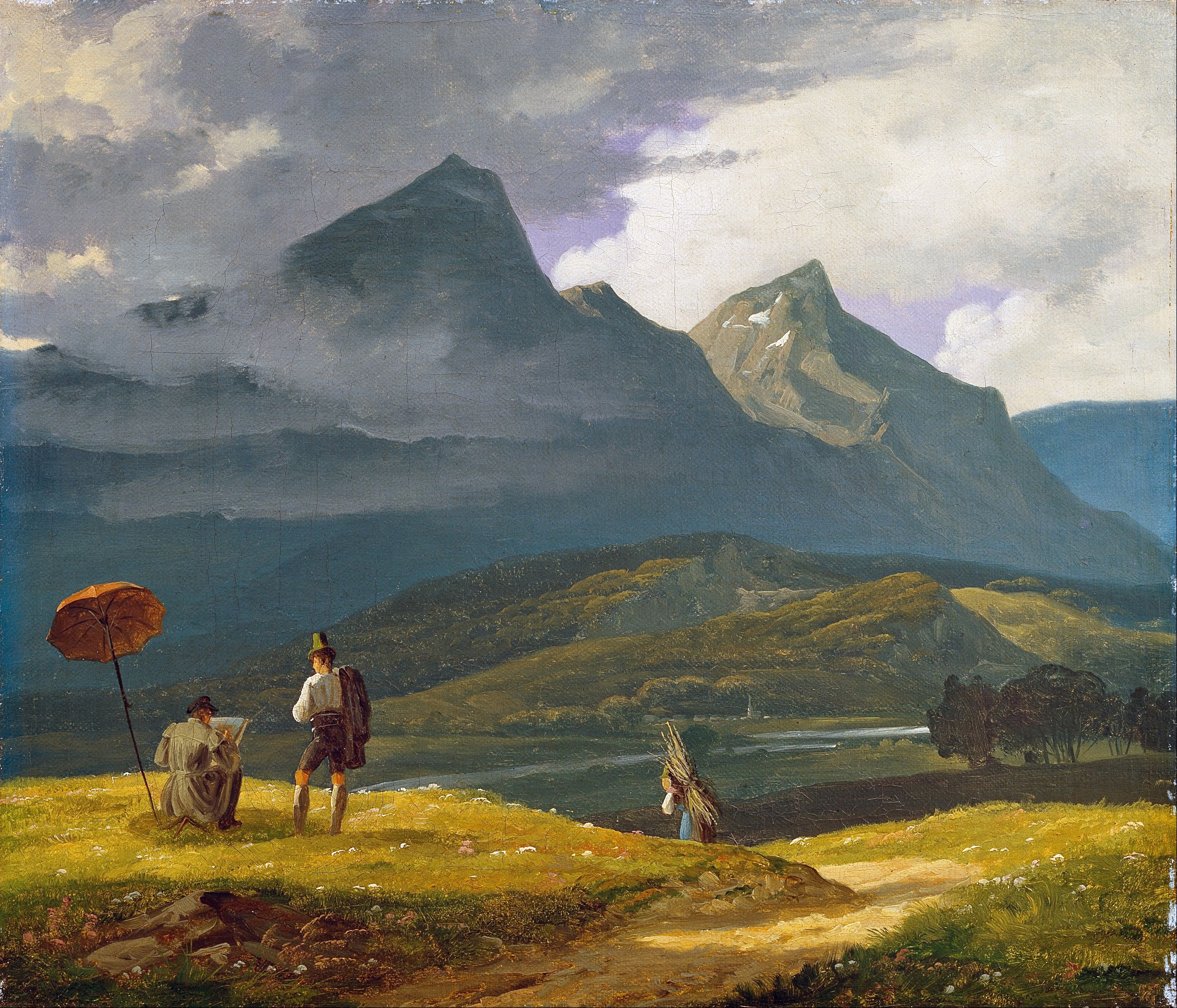
Mountain landscape.

Wilhelm Bendz was born on 20 March 1804 in Odense on the island of Funen. He was sent to Copenhagen where he attended the Royal Danish Academy of Fine Arts from 1820 to 1825, where he studied under Christoffer Wilhelm Eckersberg. In 1825 he made an unsuccessful attempt to win the gold medal, only given to history paintings, the most prestigious genre at that time, and after that decided to specialize in portraits and genre works. He may also have acquired some knowledge of contemporary German painting, the Munich School, which seems to have influenced his style.

=== Successful years at Charlottenborg ===
After his graduation from the Academy, Bendz contributed successfully with a number of works to the annual exhibitions at Charlottenborg in 1826, 1827 and 1828. Three of his paintings were acquired by the Royal Painting Collection; Model Class at the Art Academy and A young artist looking at a sketch through a mirror from 1826 and the monumentally sized A sculptor working with a live model from 1827. Another important work from this phase is A Tobacco Party from 1828.

After this Bendz was employed as an assistant at Eckersberg's studio, working on routine assignments such as the reconstruction of Nikolaj Abraham Abildgaard's history paintings from Christiansborg Palace which had been destroyed in the fire of 1794, and painting copies of Eckersberg's works.

=== Munich, 1831–32 ===
In late 1830 Bendz finally received a travel scholarship which enabled him to leave for southern Europe. After shorter visits to Dresden and Berlin, he initially went to Munich, which had developed into a vibrant centre for the arts, and where he stayed for around a year. His most important work from the stay is the thoroughly composed group portrait "Artist in the Evening at Finck's Coffee House in Munich".

=== Early death in Italy ===
In the autumn of 1832 he continued his journey towards Rome in company with Joseph Petzl and Thomas Fearnley, stopping in Venice on the way where he renewed his friendship with the painter Ditlev Blunck, who he had first met in his student days at the Academy in Copenhagen. They continued together but shortly after in Vicenza, Bendz, who had felt ill since Venice, died from a lung infection.

== Works ==
Today he is mainly remembered for his many technically accomplished portraits, though his ambition most of all ran towards a refined fusion of portrait, genre scene and allegorical history painting. His technical virtuosity is particularly visible in his depictions of the play of light cast from an obscured source and the resulting shadows.

His main works include several portraits of his fellow artists such as Ditlev Blunck and Christen Christensen (both in the Danish National Gallery, a scene from the Academy's anatomy class, as well as the group portraits "A Tobacco Party" (Ny Carlsberg Glyptotek) and "Artist in the Evening at Finck's Coffee House in Munich" (Thorvaldsens Museum).

== Paintings (examples of his works) ==
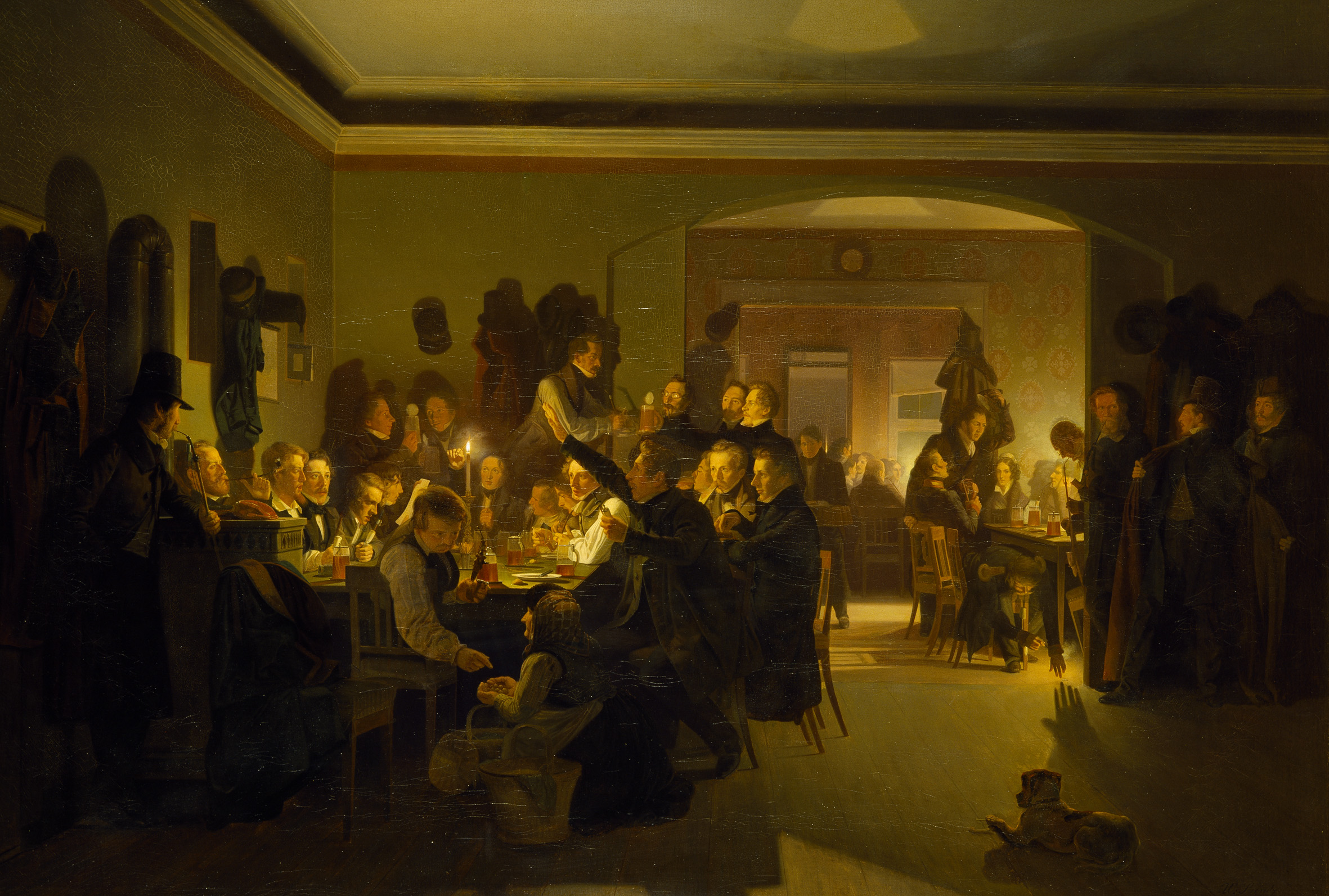
Artist in the Evening at Finck's Coffee House in Munich, 1832 (Thorvaldsens Museum). Bendz is seen second from the right

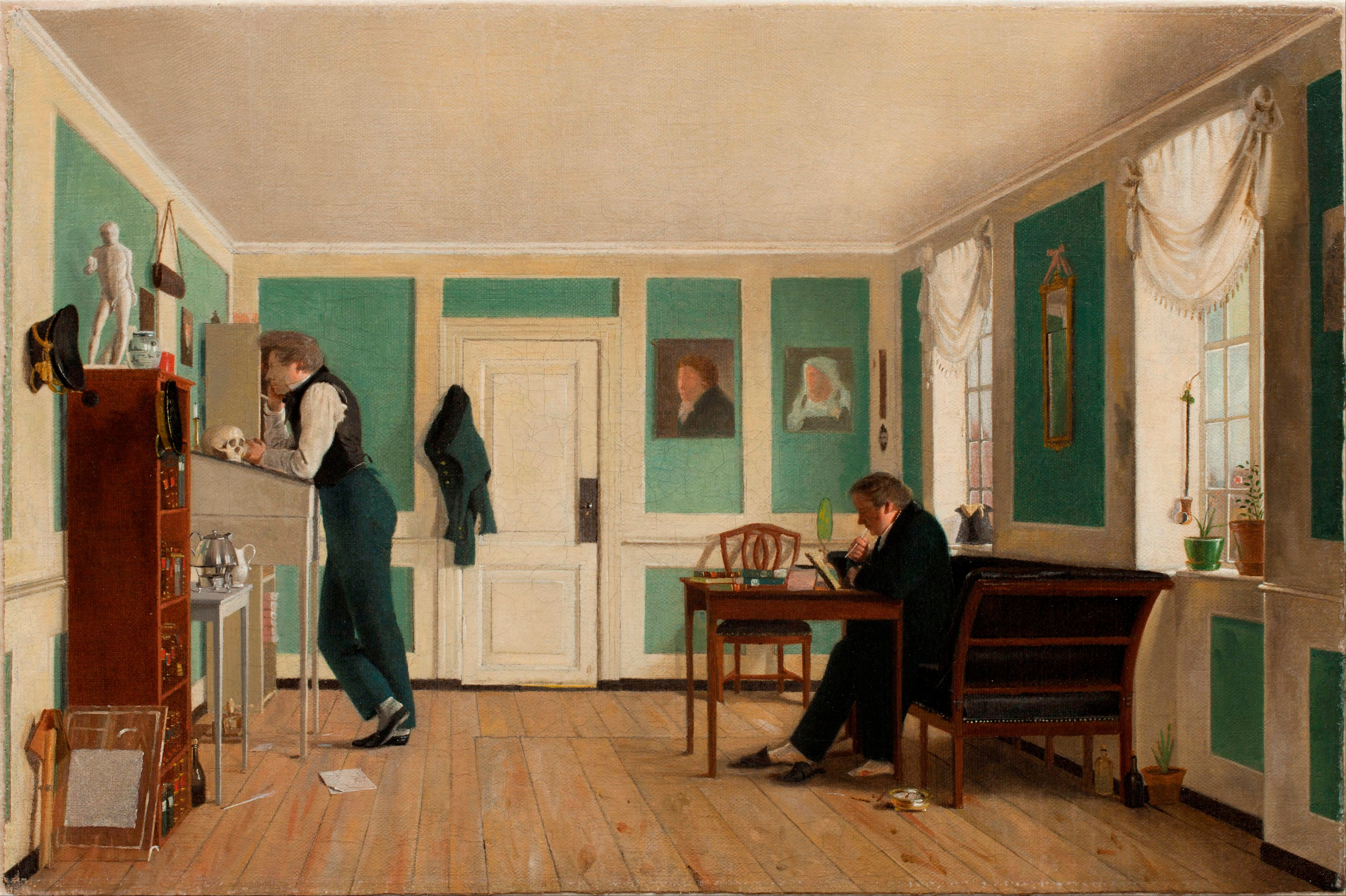
Room in Amaliegade with the Artist's Brothers, c. 1826

Model Class at the Copenhagen Academy, 1826, Royal Academy of Fine Arts

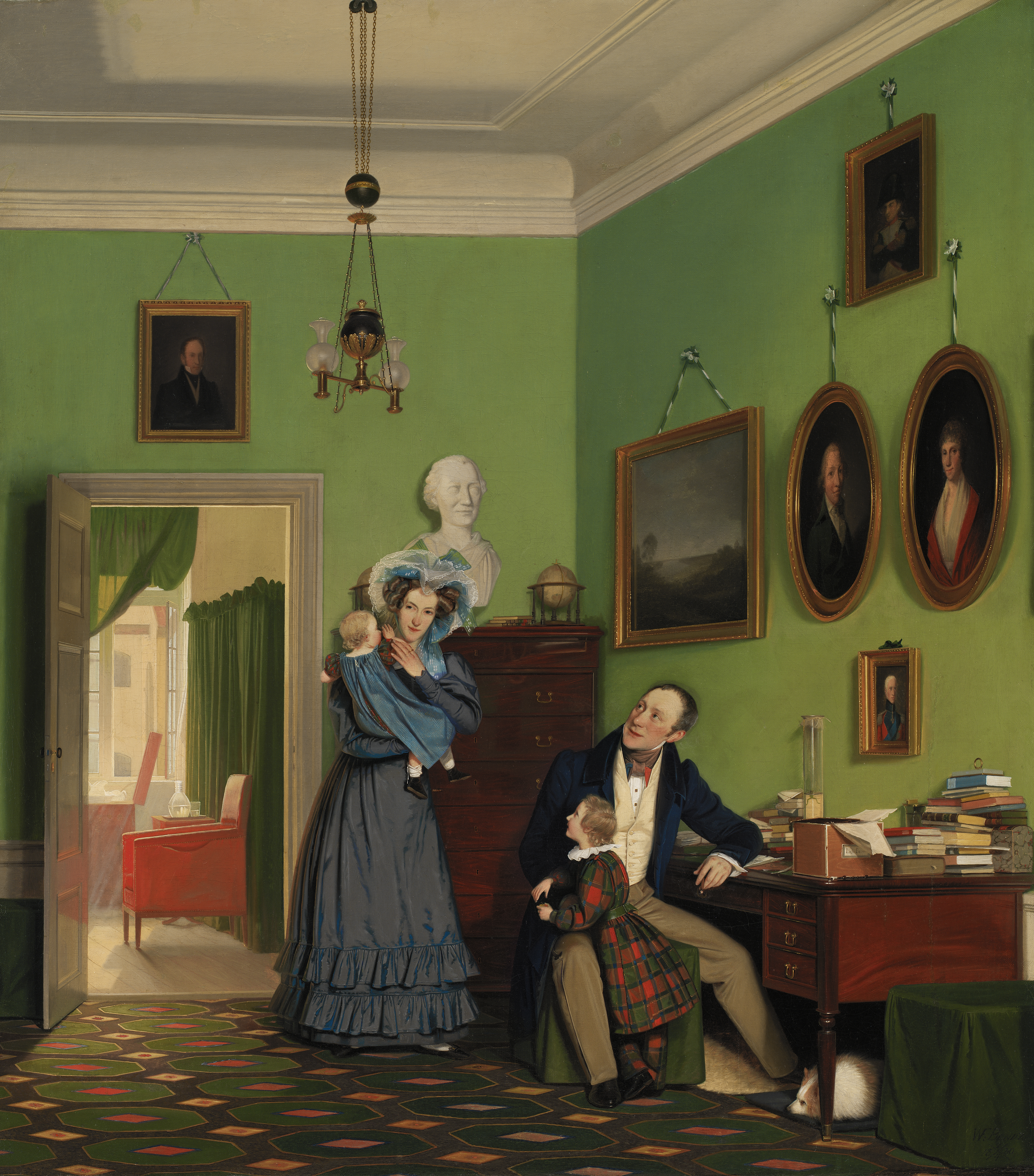
The Waagepetersen Family (1830), Statens Museum for Kunst

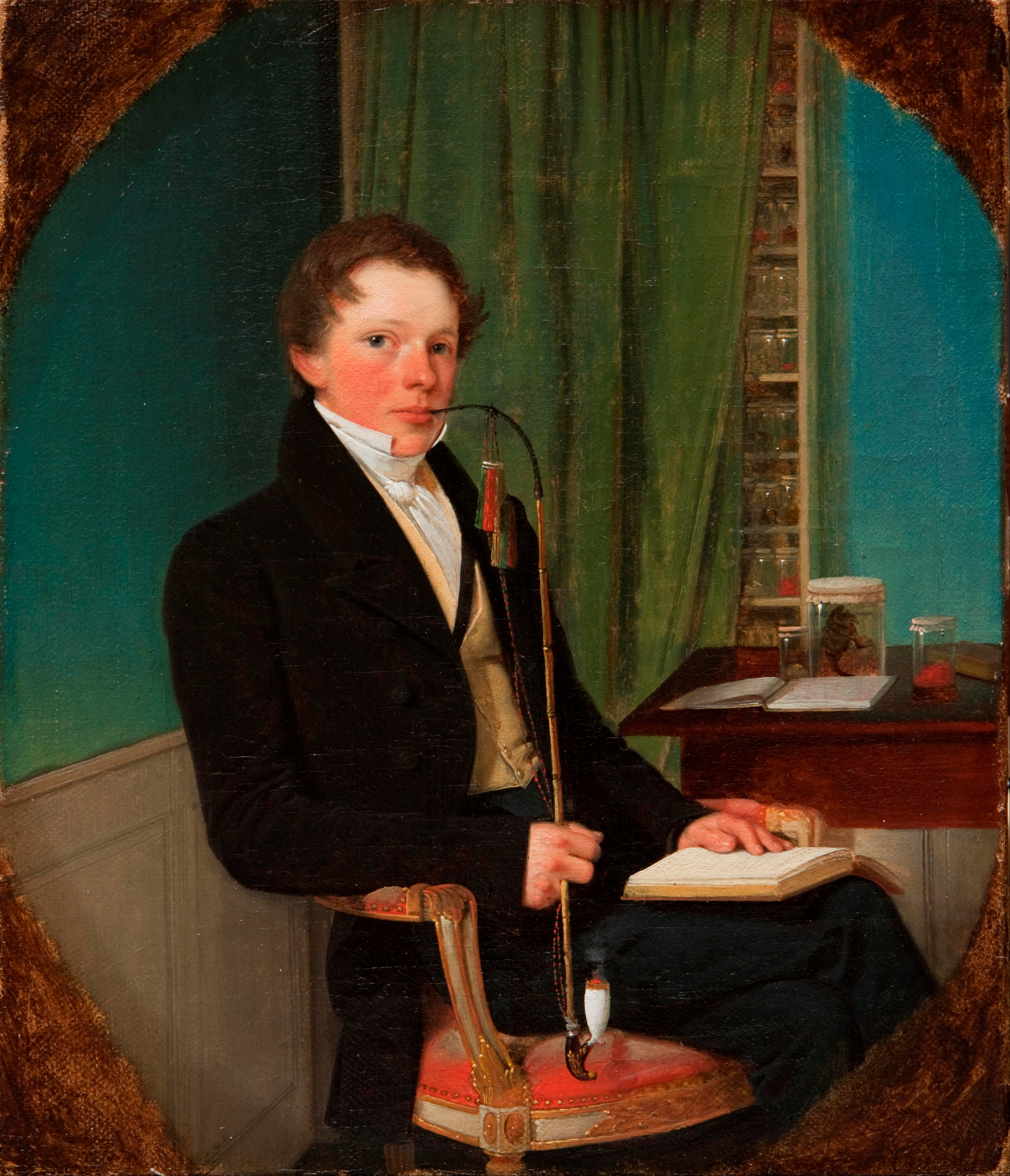
Portrait of the anatomist Henrik Carl Bang Bendz, the artist's brother

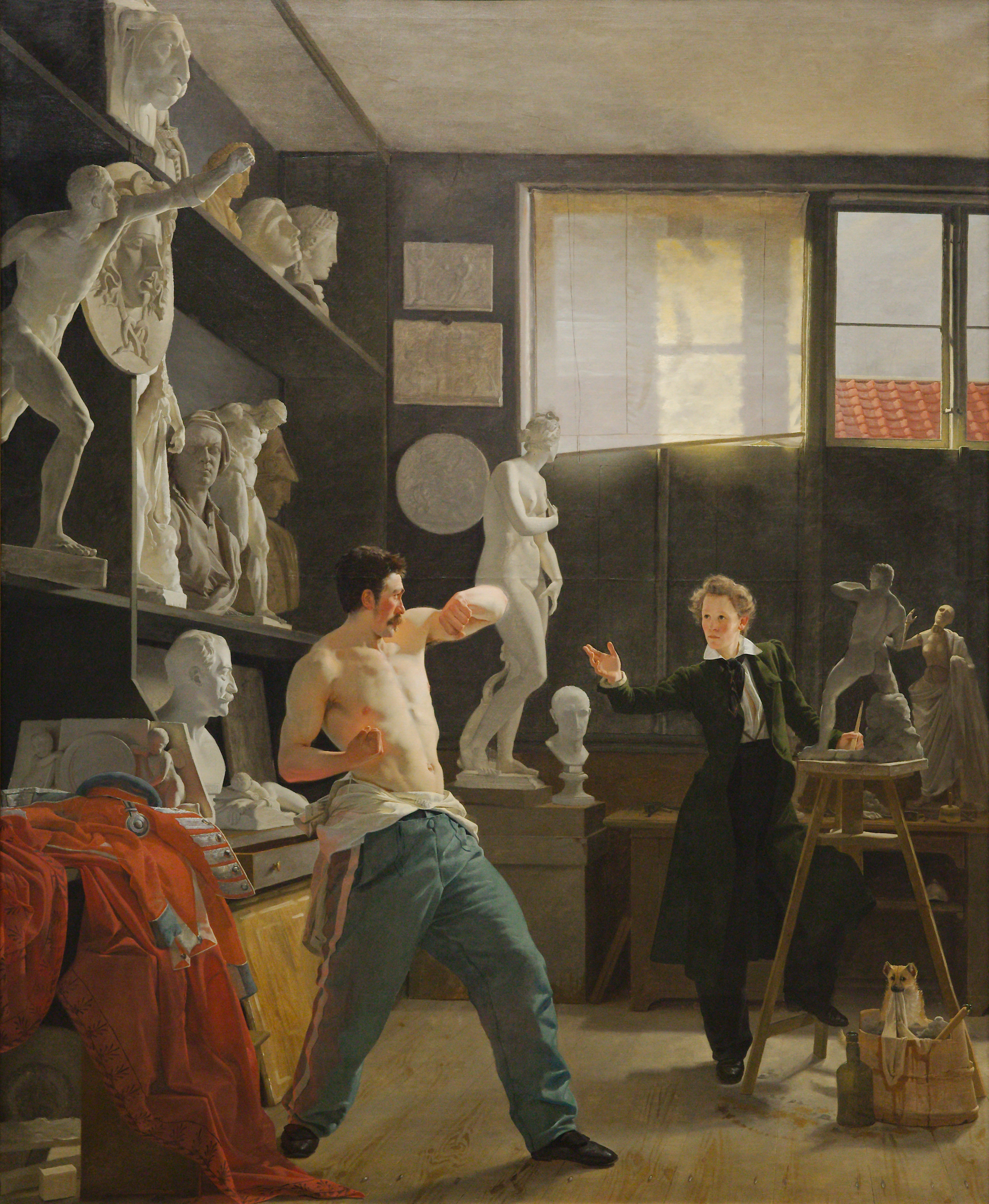
The Sculptor Christen Christensen Working with a Live Model in His Studio, 1827

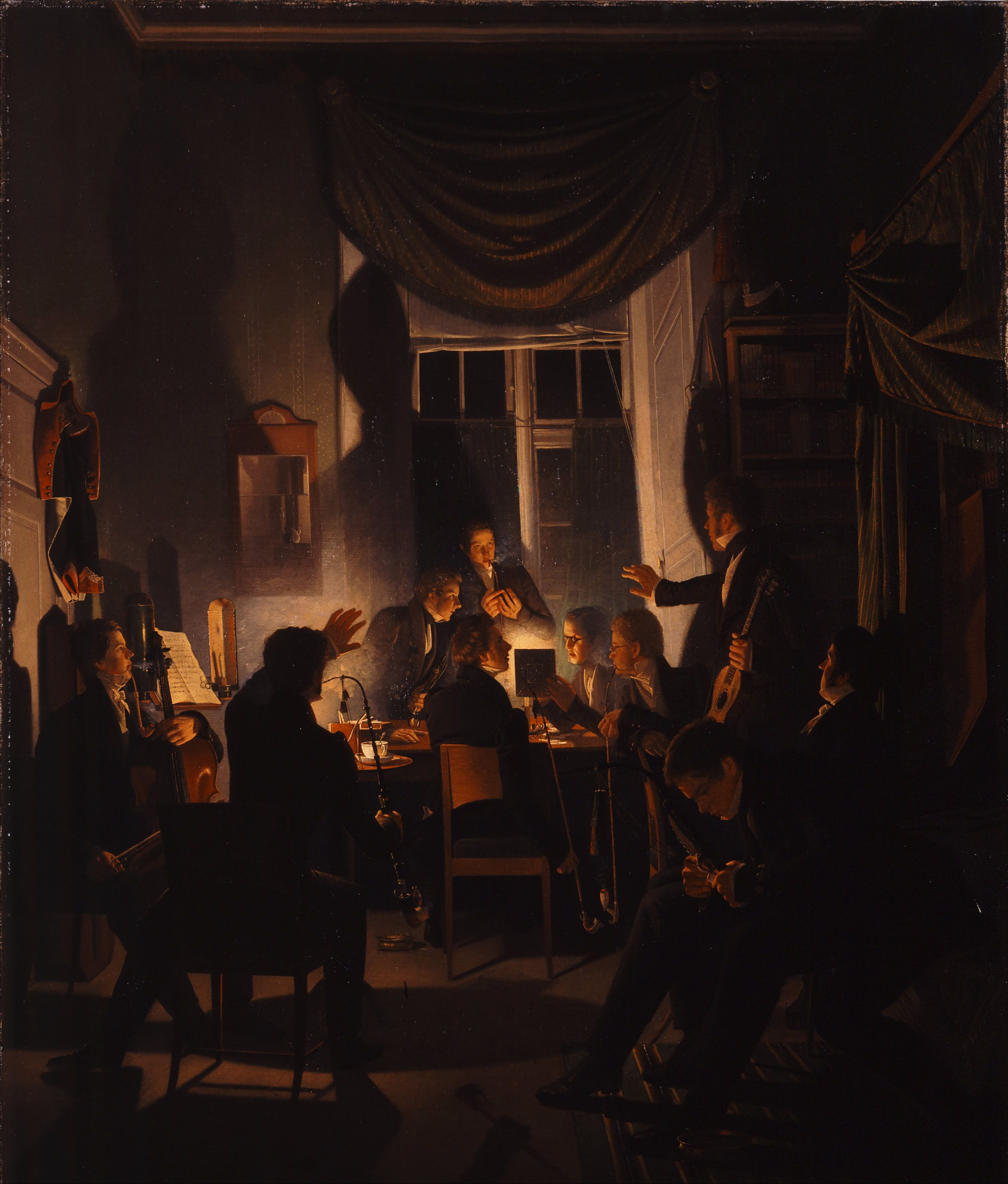
A Smoking Party, 1828 (NY Carlberg Glyptoteck, Copenhagen)

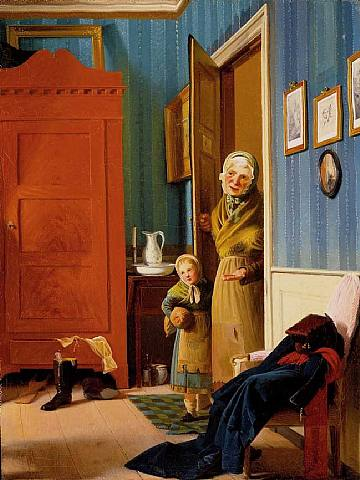
The Visit of the Beggar and her Child, 1829

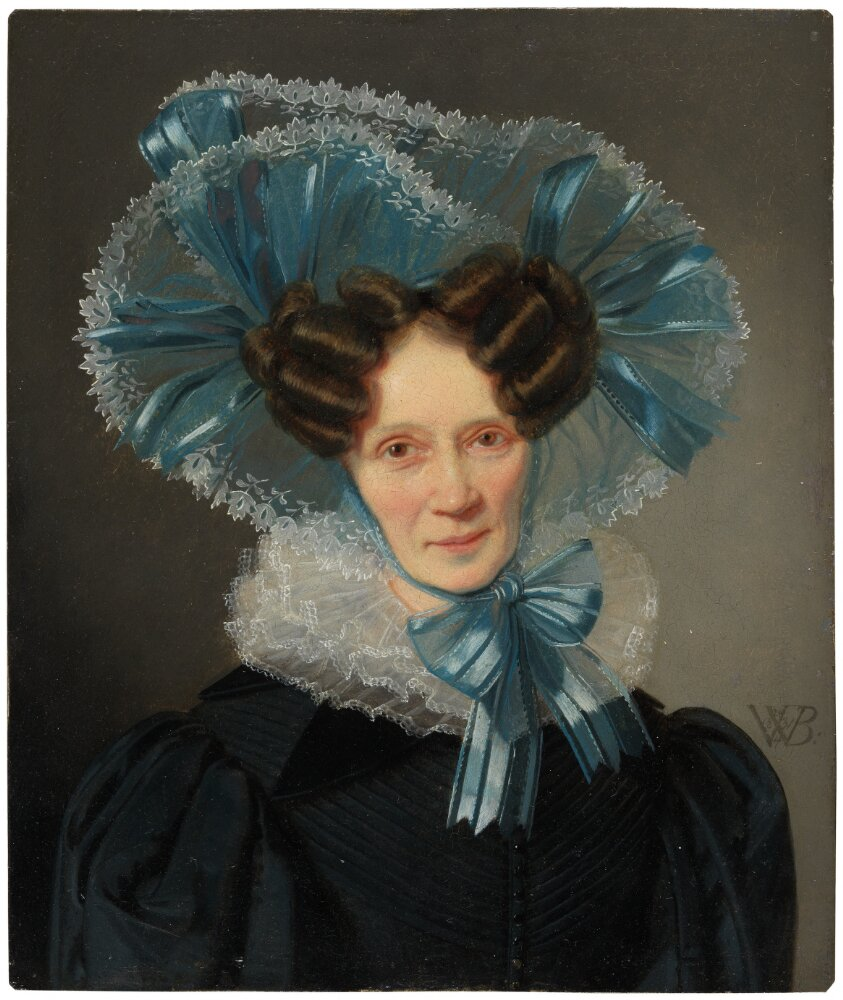
Countess Sophia Vilhelmine Moltke, née Levetzau, 1831, Nationalmuseum, Stockholm

== See also ==
- Art of Denmark

== Bibliography ==
- Mortensen, Klaus P. (2001). Wilhelm Bendz. Søren Fogtdal. ISBN 978-87-617-3012-1.
- Rewald, Sabine (2011). Rooms with a View The Open Window in the 19th Century; [publ. in Conjunction with the Exhibition Rooms with a View The Open Window in the 19th Century, Held at The Metropolitan Museum of Art, New York, April 5 - July 4, 2011]. Yale University Press. ISBN 978-0-300-16977-5.
- Bendz, Wilhelm; Saabye, Marianne; Johannesson, Birgitte (1996). Wilhelm Bendz 1804-1832 et ungt kunstnerliv. ISBN 978-87-981369-7-2.
- Johansson, Ejner (1995). Wilhelm Bendz. Spektrum. ISBN 978-87-7763-130-6.
