= Ditlev Blunck =

Danish artist (1798–1853)

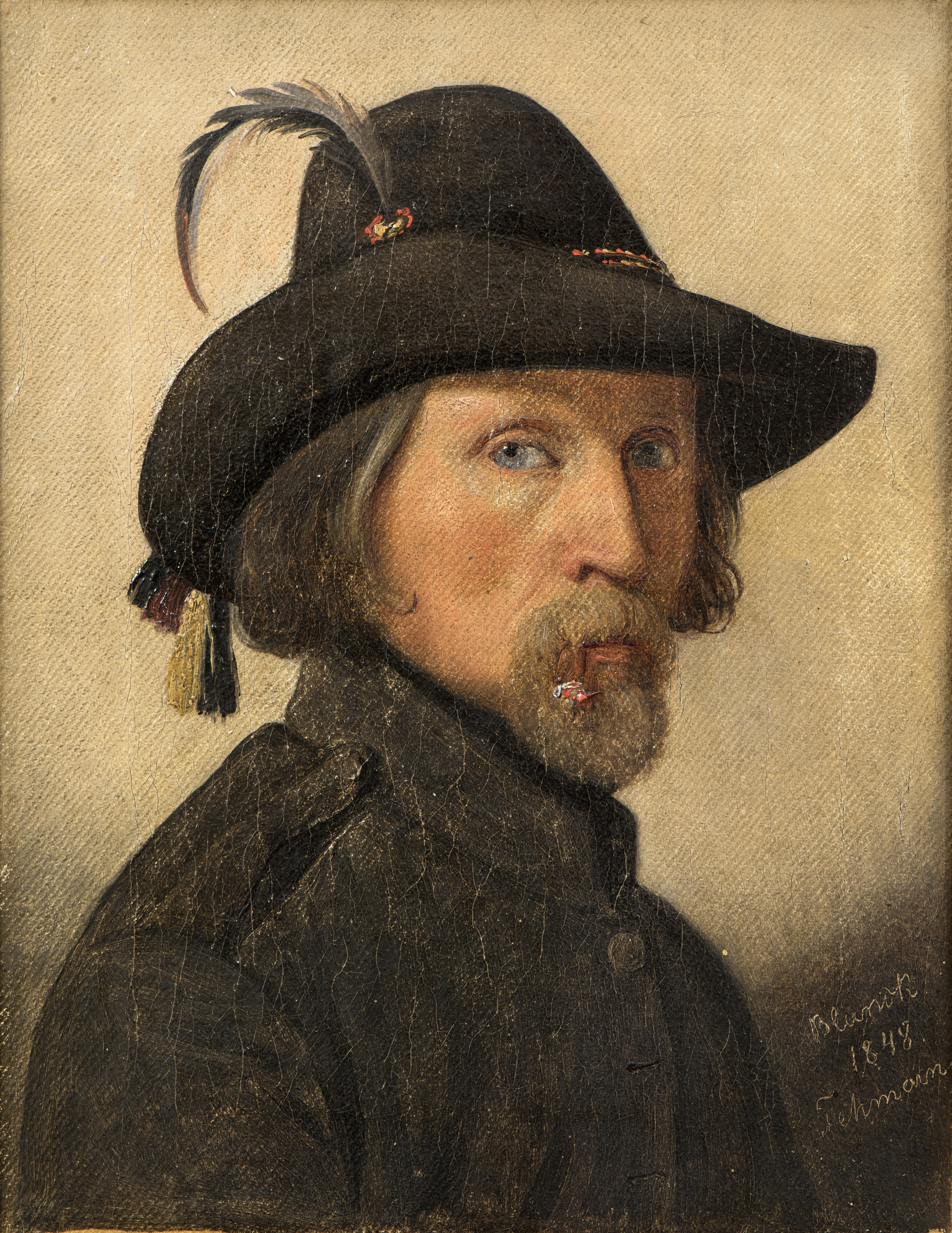
- Self-portrait as Legionnaire (1848)
- Born: 22 June 1798; Münsterdorf, Duchy of Holstein
- Died: 7 January 1853 (aged 54); Free and Hanseatic City Hamburg
- Education: Royal Danish Academy of Fine Arts, Copenhagen; Royal Academy of Fine Arts, Munich
- Known for: Painting
- Movement: Danish Golden Age

Ditlev Conrad Blunck (22 June 1798 – 7 January 1853) was a Danish-German painter associated with the Danish Golden Age during the first half of the 19th century.

== Biography ==
Blunck was born in 1798 in Münsterdorf in Holstein, at that time a duchy with a largely German-speaking populace ruled by Denmark. In 1814 he began his studies at the Royal Danish Academy of Art in Copenhagen as a student of C.A. Lorentzen and C.W. Eckersberg. He was trained concurrently with fellow students Wilhelm Bendz, Ernst Meyer, and Albert Küchler. Presumably dissatisfied with the Danish Academy, Blunck moved in 1818 to Munich and enrolled at the Royal Academy of Fine Arts to train in history painting. He studied in Bavaria for two years before returning to Copenhagen.

Back in Denmark, Blunck became a student of the recently appointed J. L. Lund, a Romantic historical painter who was to become a major influence on his development. Thus, it was also mostly history painting that marked Blunck's early work. Later, through genre painting, Blunck became representative of the kind of everyday realism that was to appear in Danish art in the mid-1820s.

Lund's influence grew particularly clear during Blunck's stay in Germany beginning in 1828. In Berlin, Munich, and Dresden, he became acquainted with Lund's artist-friends, including the famed Romantic painter Caspar David Friedrich.

Blunck's sojourns abroad also brought him repeatedly to Rome, where he spent almost ten years. Here, he joined the group of Danish artists around Bertel Thorvaldsen and produced several of his major paintings, including Danish Artists in the Roman Inn La Gensola (1837). Deeply influenced by the works of Johann Friedrich Overbeck in Rome, Blunck began to devote himself to religious motifs and developed a painting style that was strongly influenced by the Nazarene movement, unusual among Danish painters.

In 1840, he was expelled from Denmark due to homosexual acts. As a result, he left the country, and after visits to his native region and to Munich, he settled in Vienna in 1841. His criminal record and his decision to take up arms against Denmark in the First Schleswig War (1848-1852) made him persona non grata in Denmark, and his reputation has suffered to the present day. Nonetheless, he was commissioned by King Christian VIII of Denmark to paint the four-part cycle "The Ages of Man" (1840–45) for the Royal Painting Collection.

== Works ==
Italian Motifs

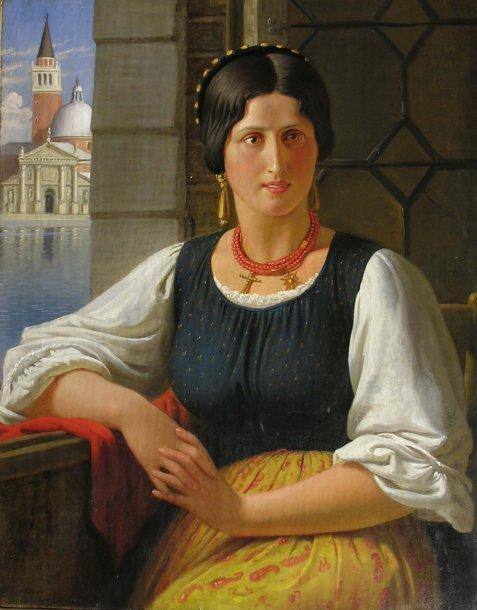
Venetian Woman (undated)

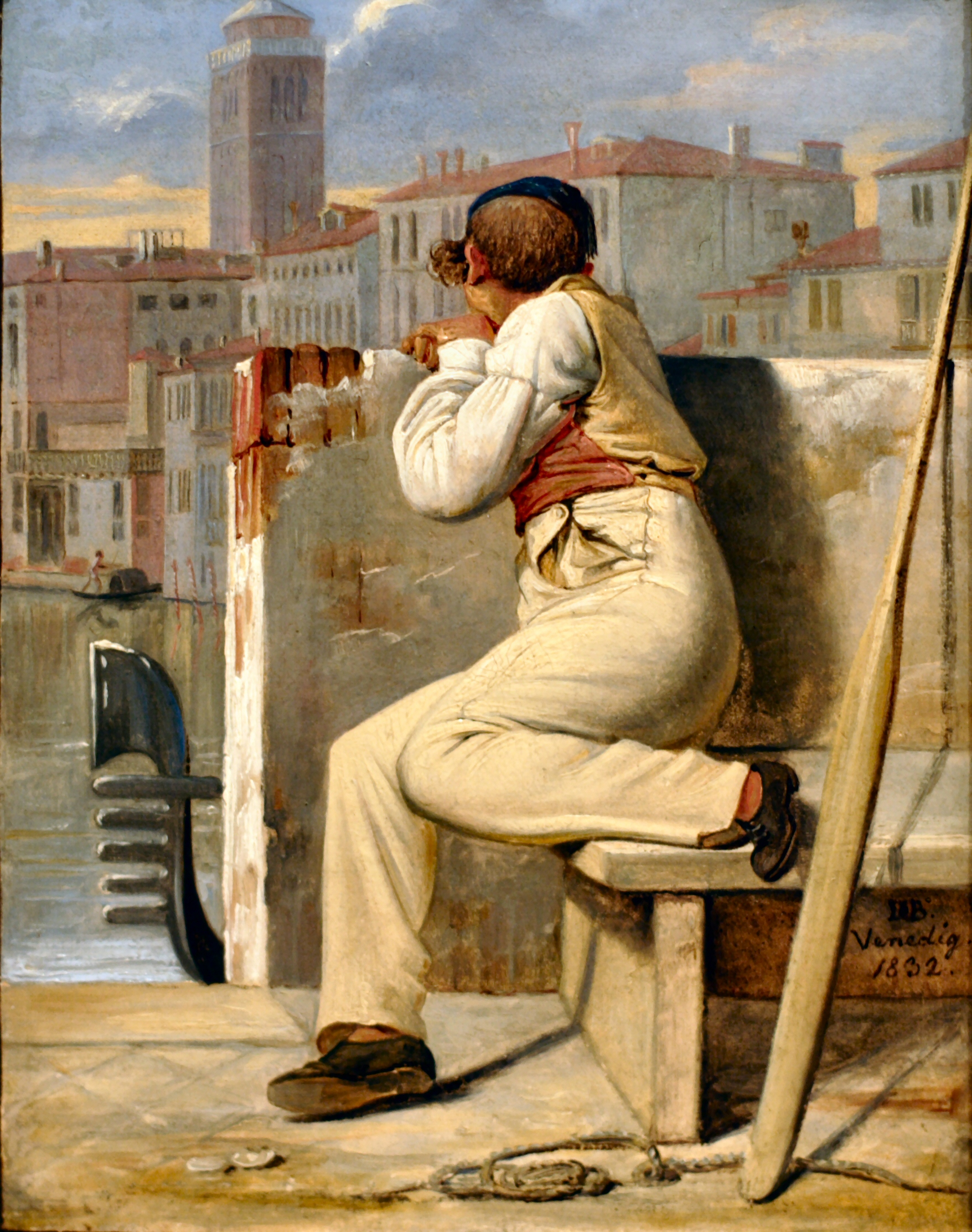
Gondolier (1832)

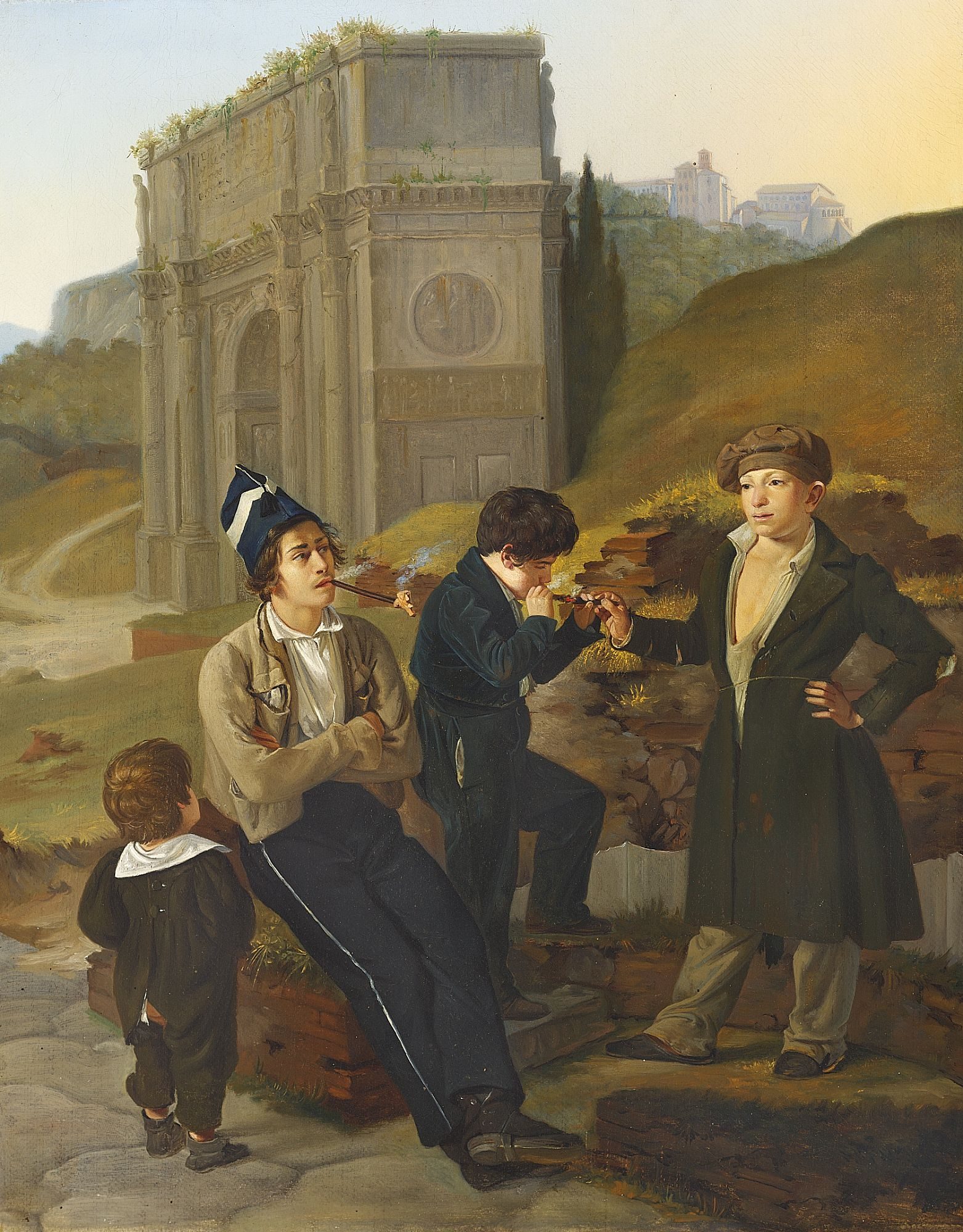
Roman Scene - Boys Smoking Tobacco (undated)

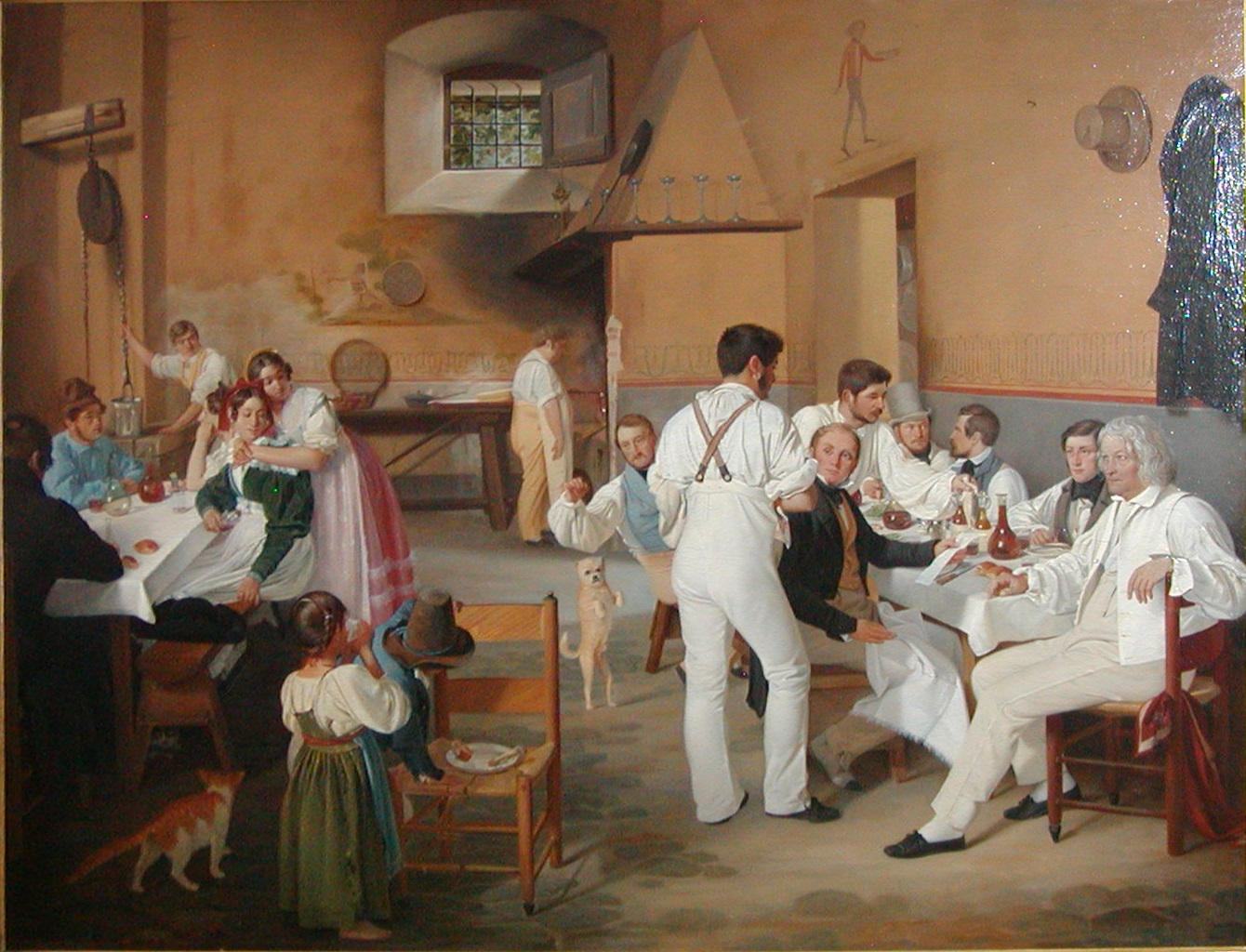
Danish Artists in the Roman Inn La Gensola (1837)
Religious Motifs

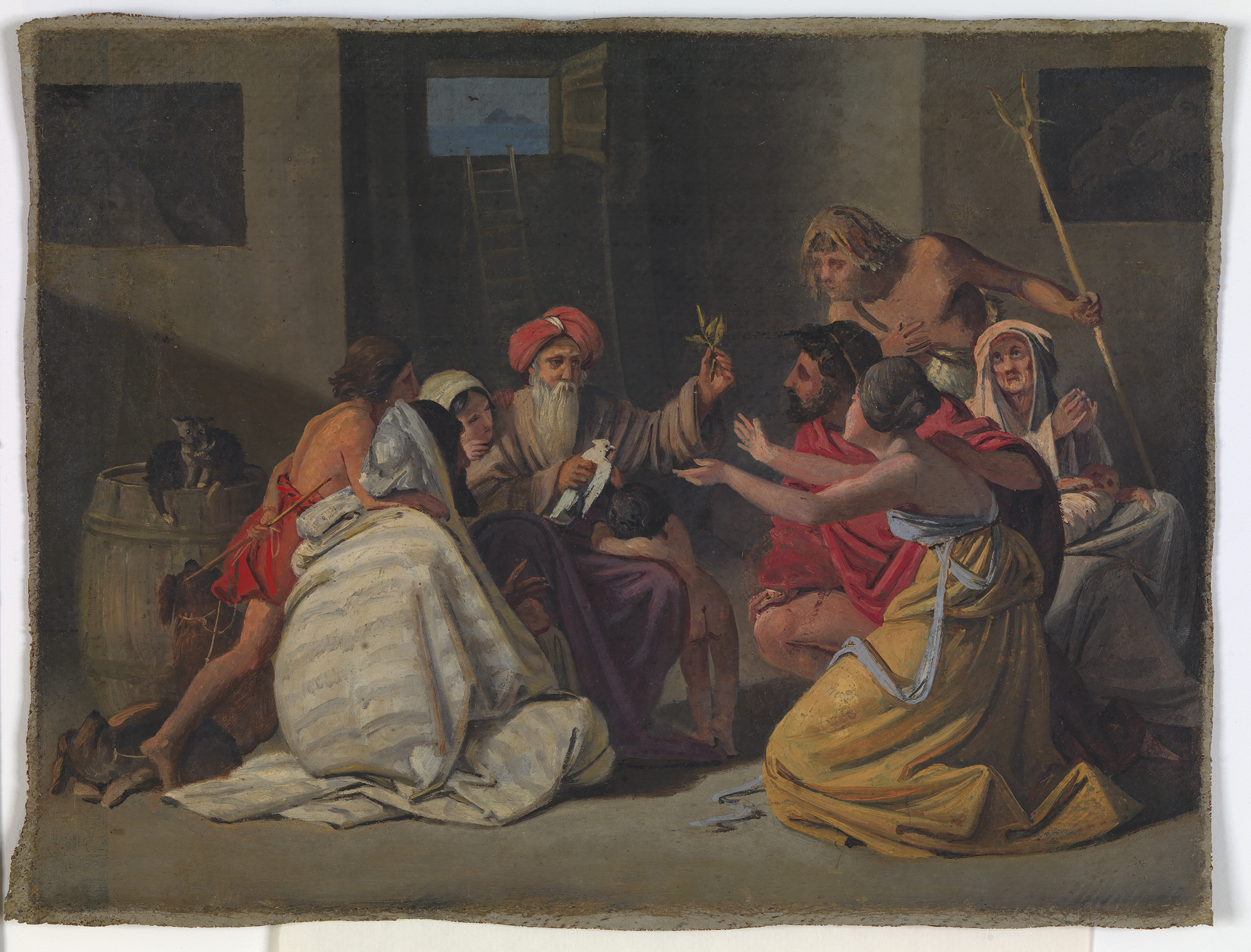
Noah in the Ark (undated)

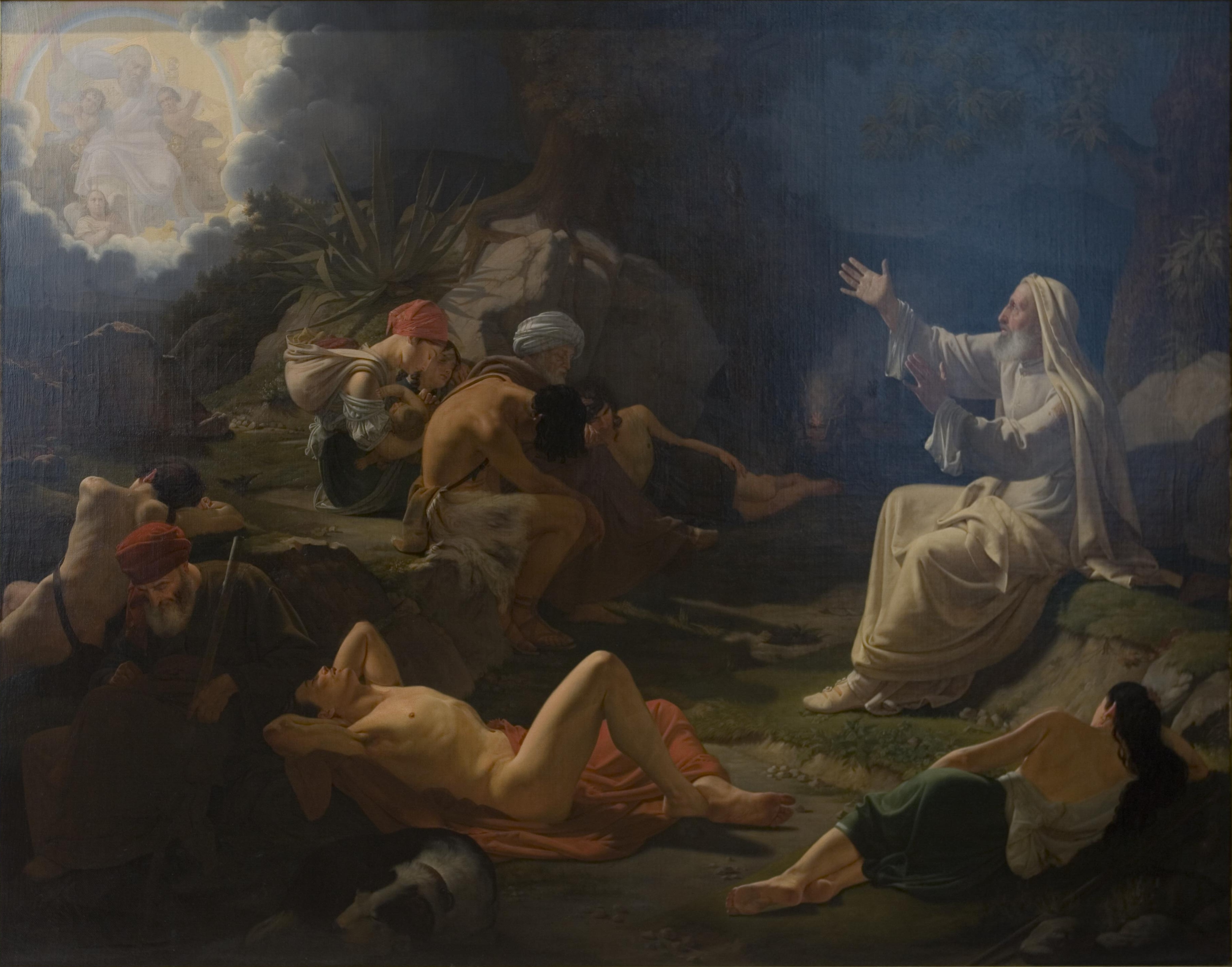
Vision of the Prophet Ezekiel (1830)

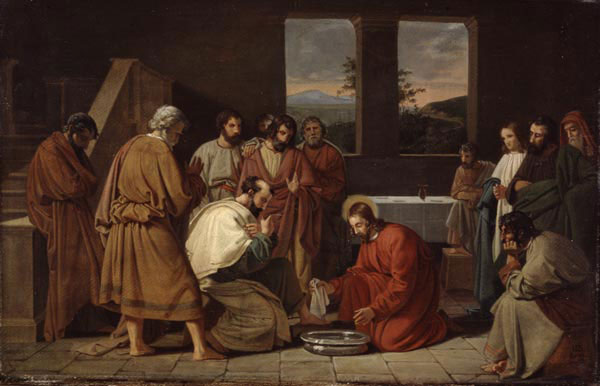
The Footwashing (1831)
The Ages of Man

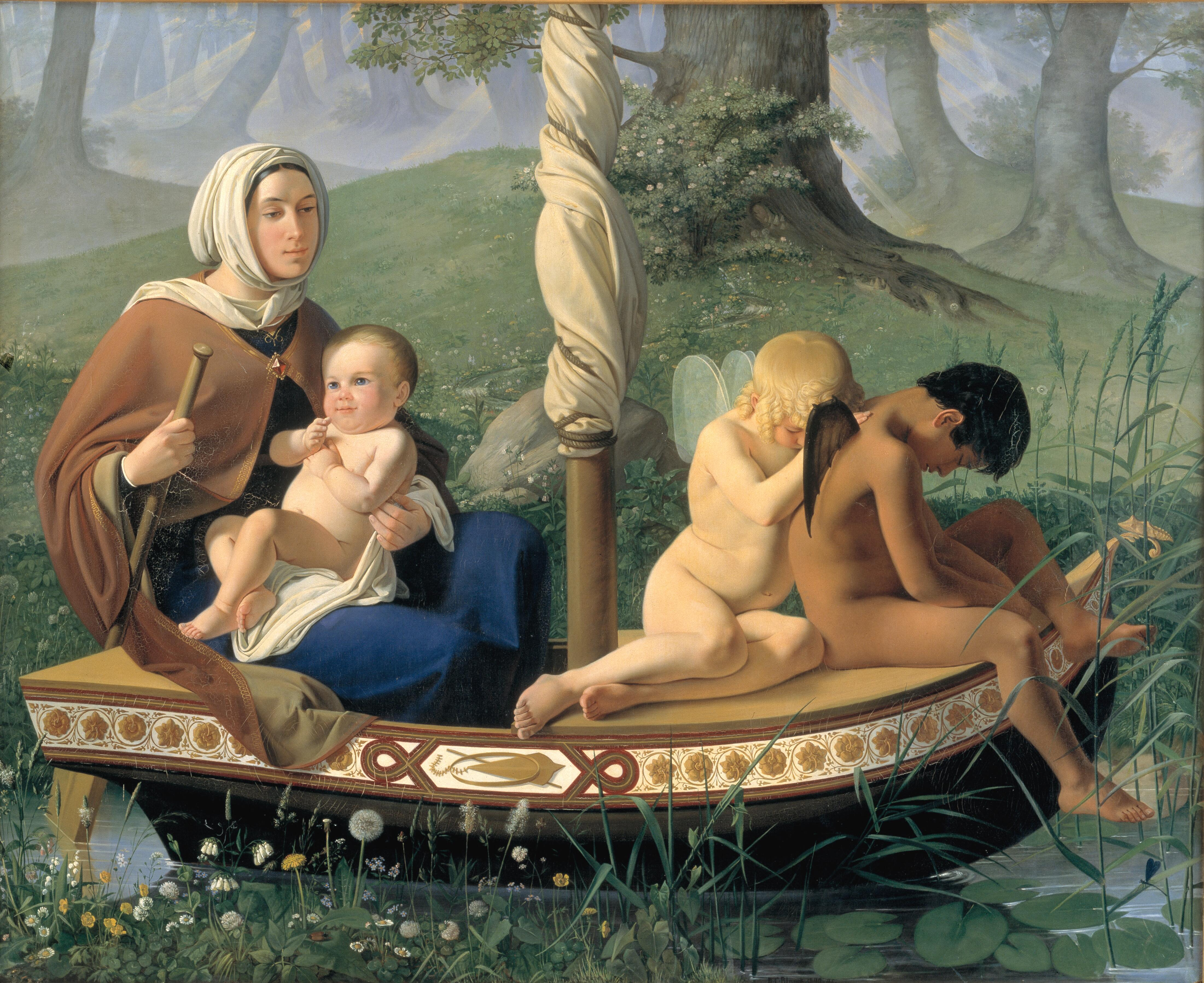
Infancy

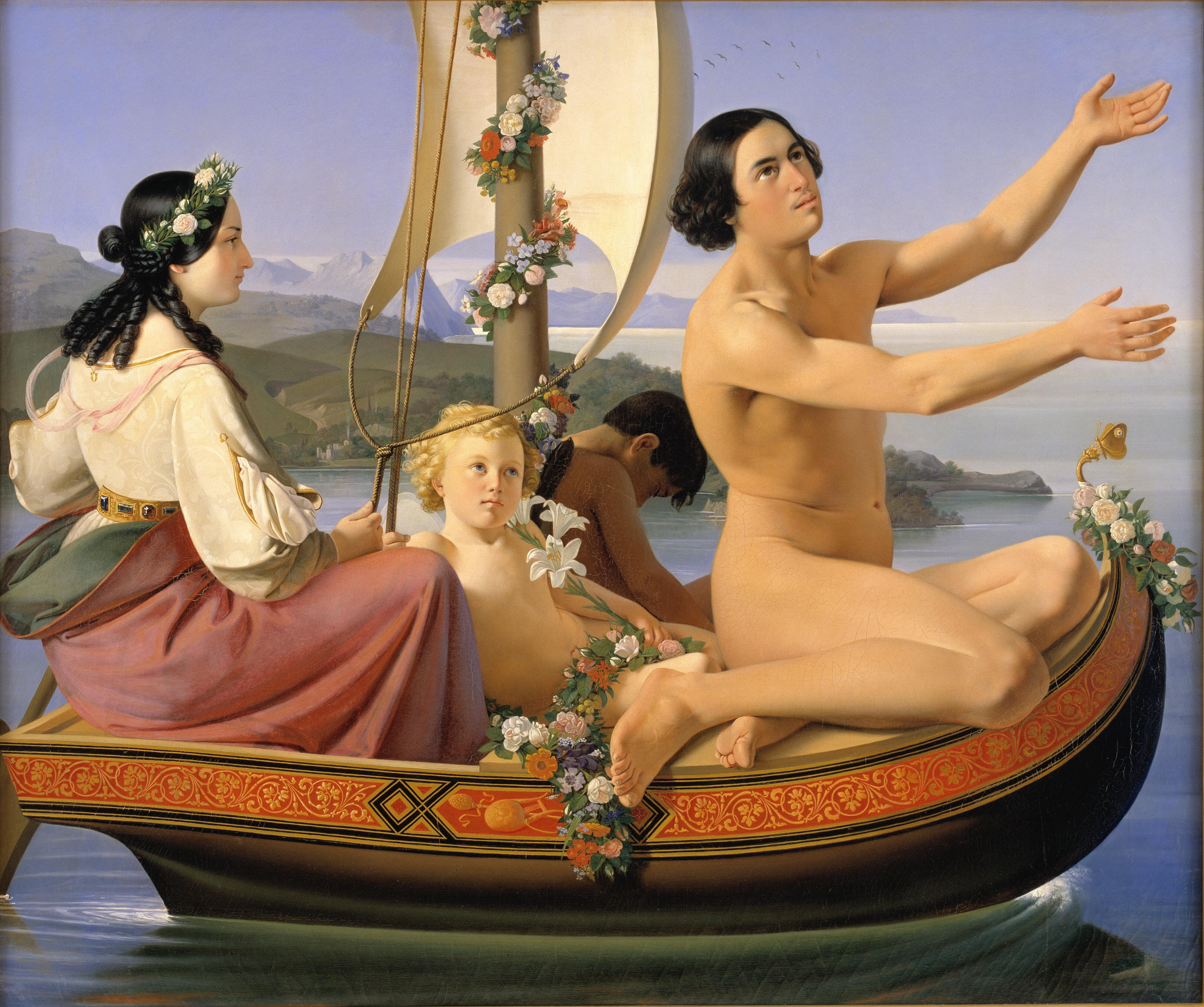
Youth

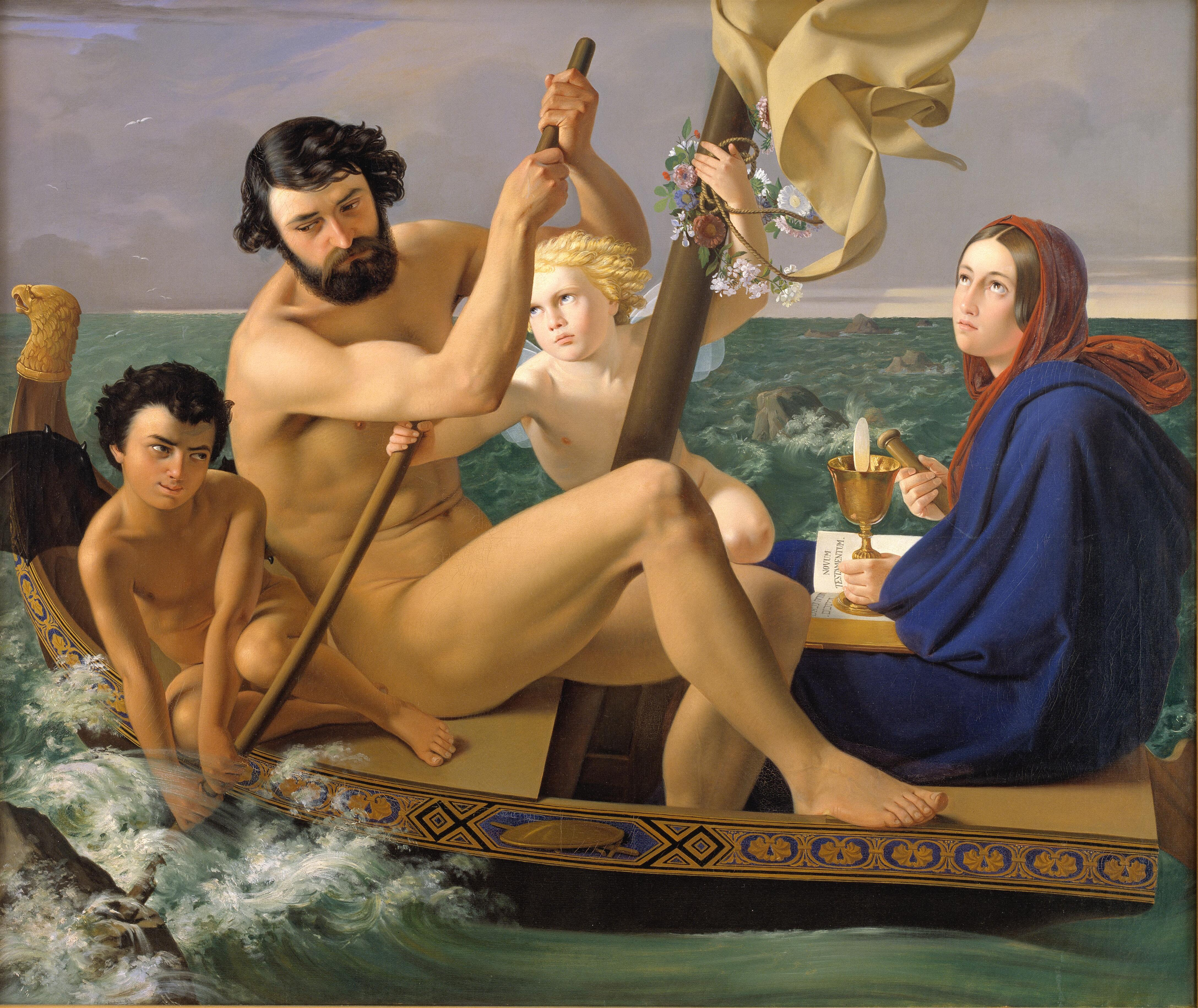
Manhood

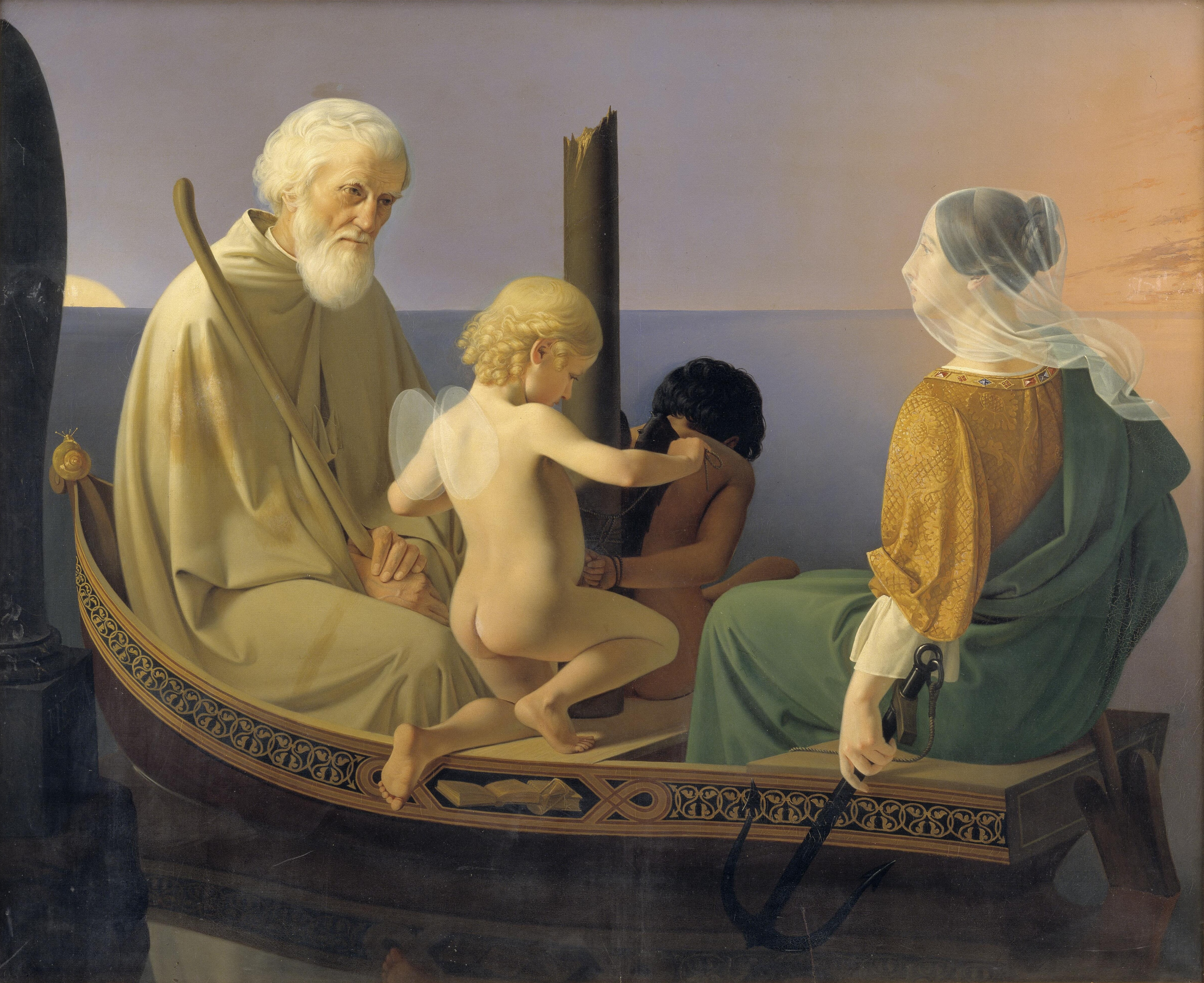
Old Age
Artist Portraits

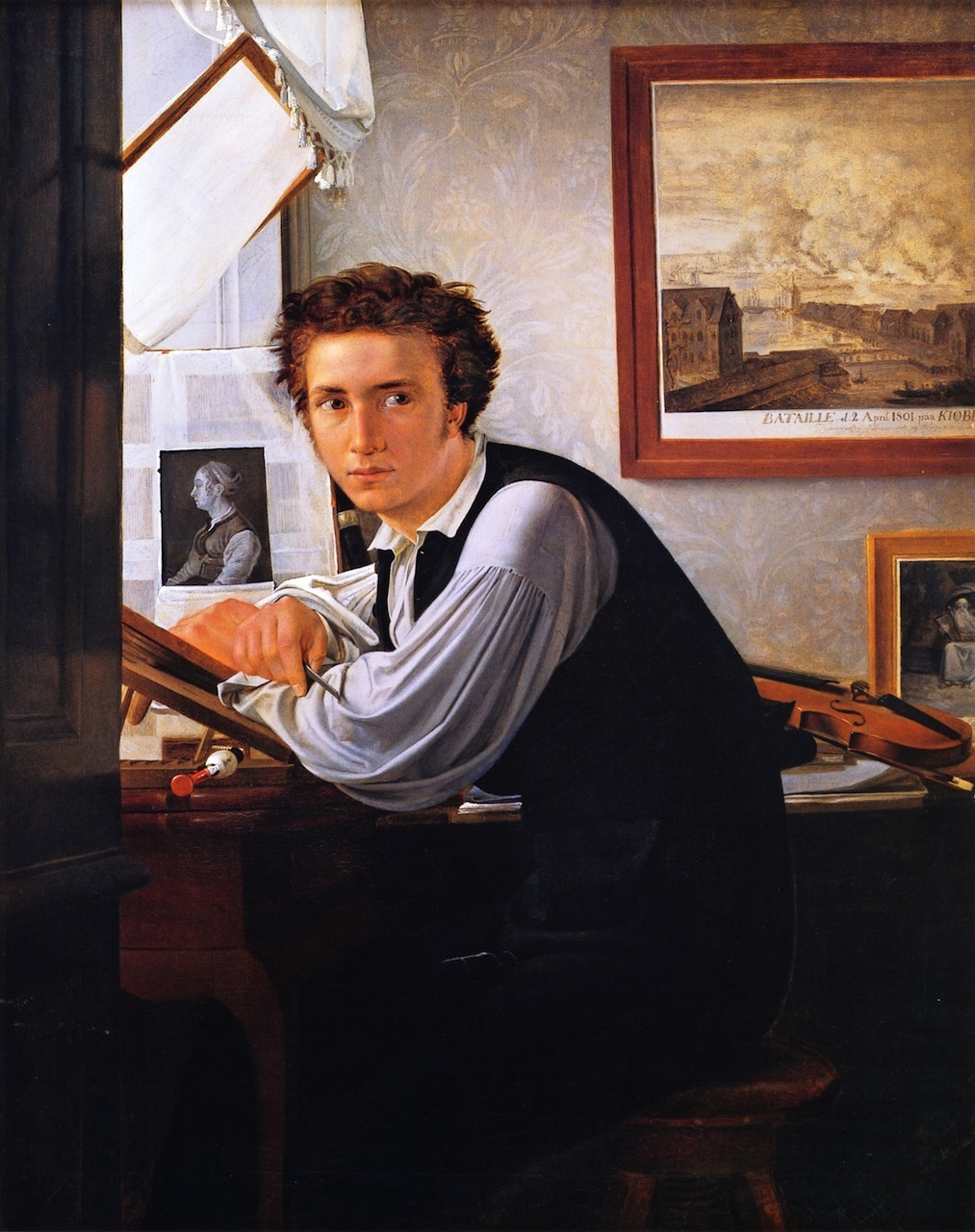
Copperplate Engraver Carl Edvard Sonne (ca. 1826)

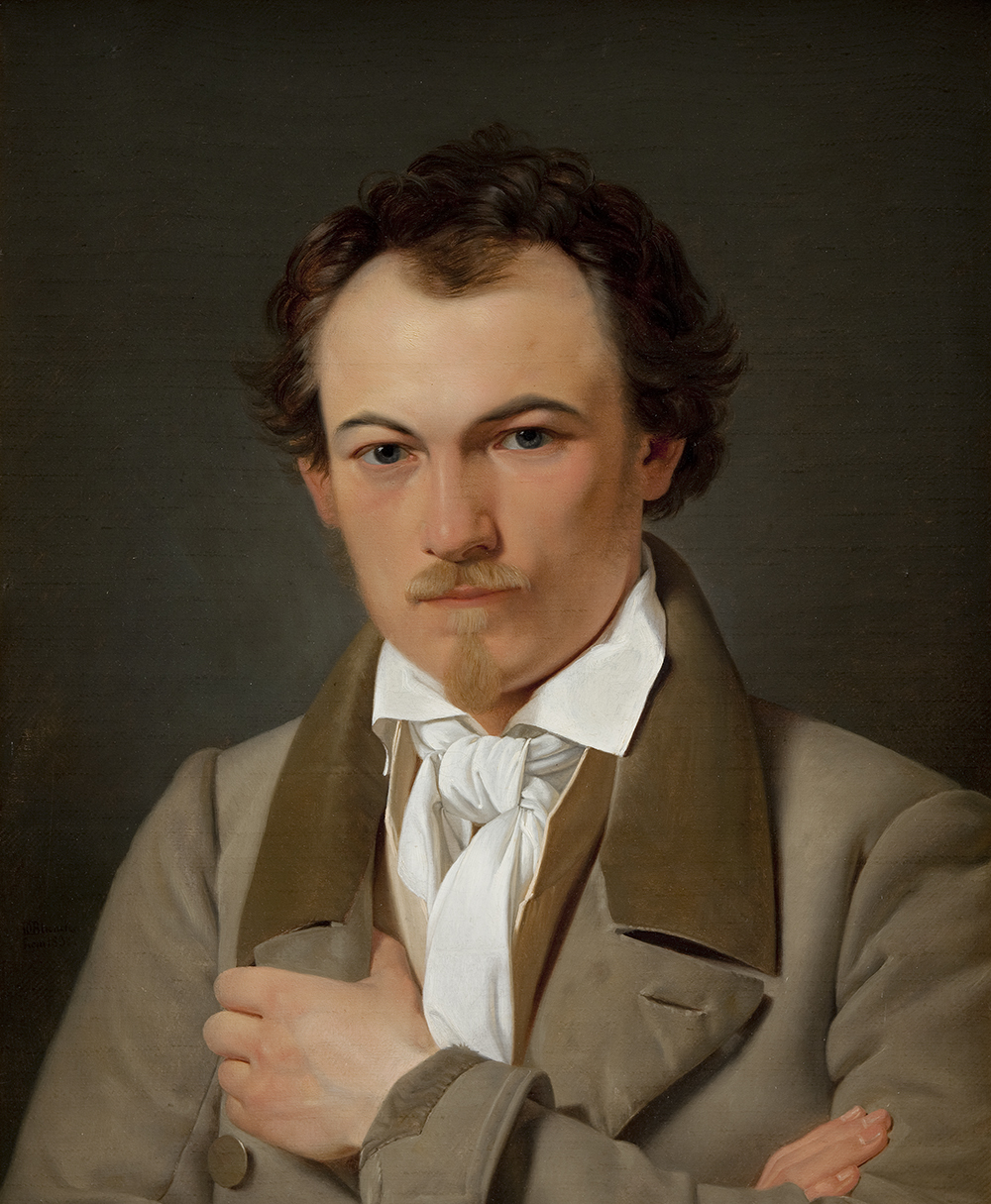
Scenery Painter Troels Lund (1831)

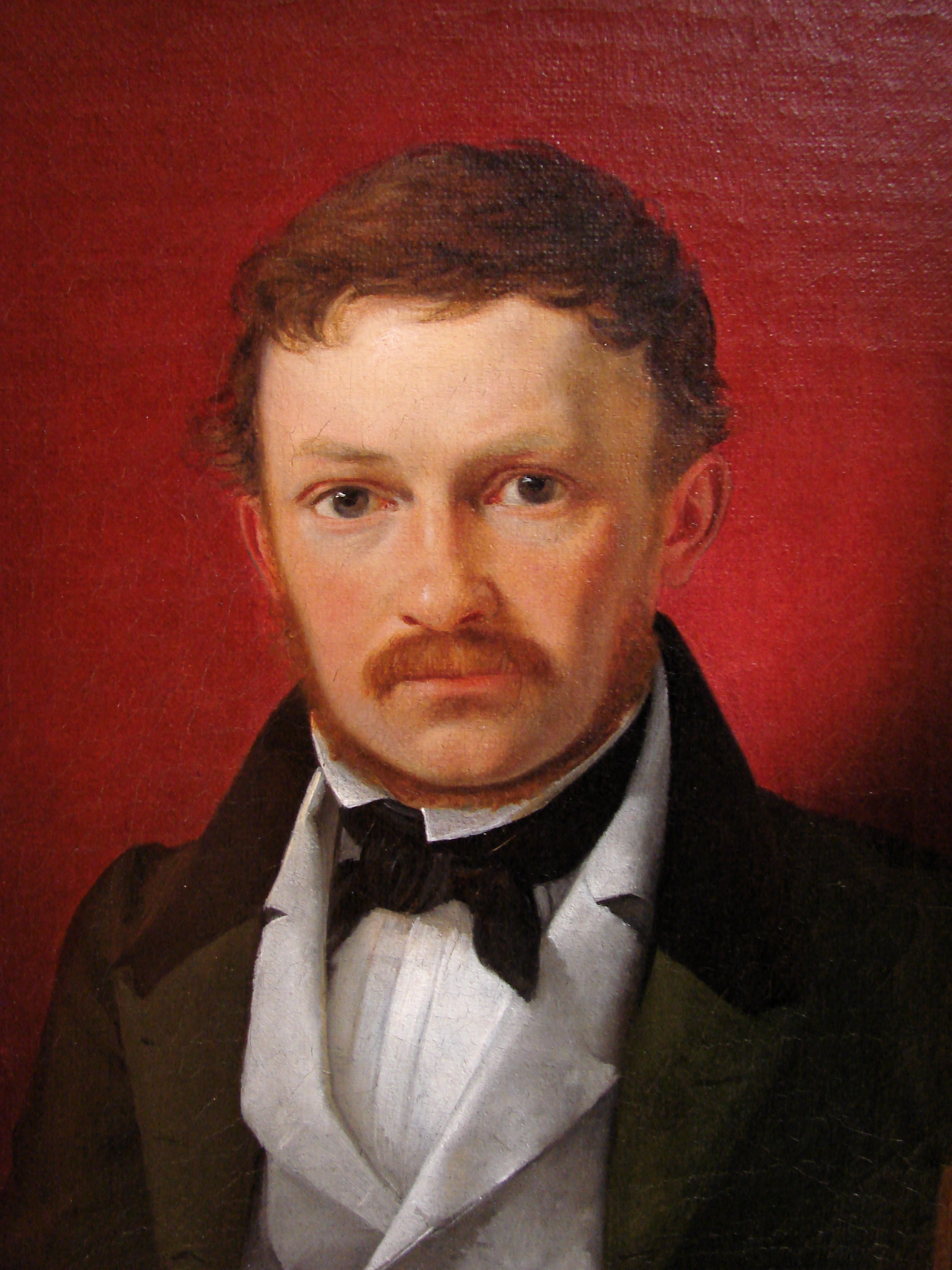
Architect Gottlieb Bindesbøll (1837)

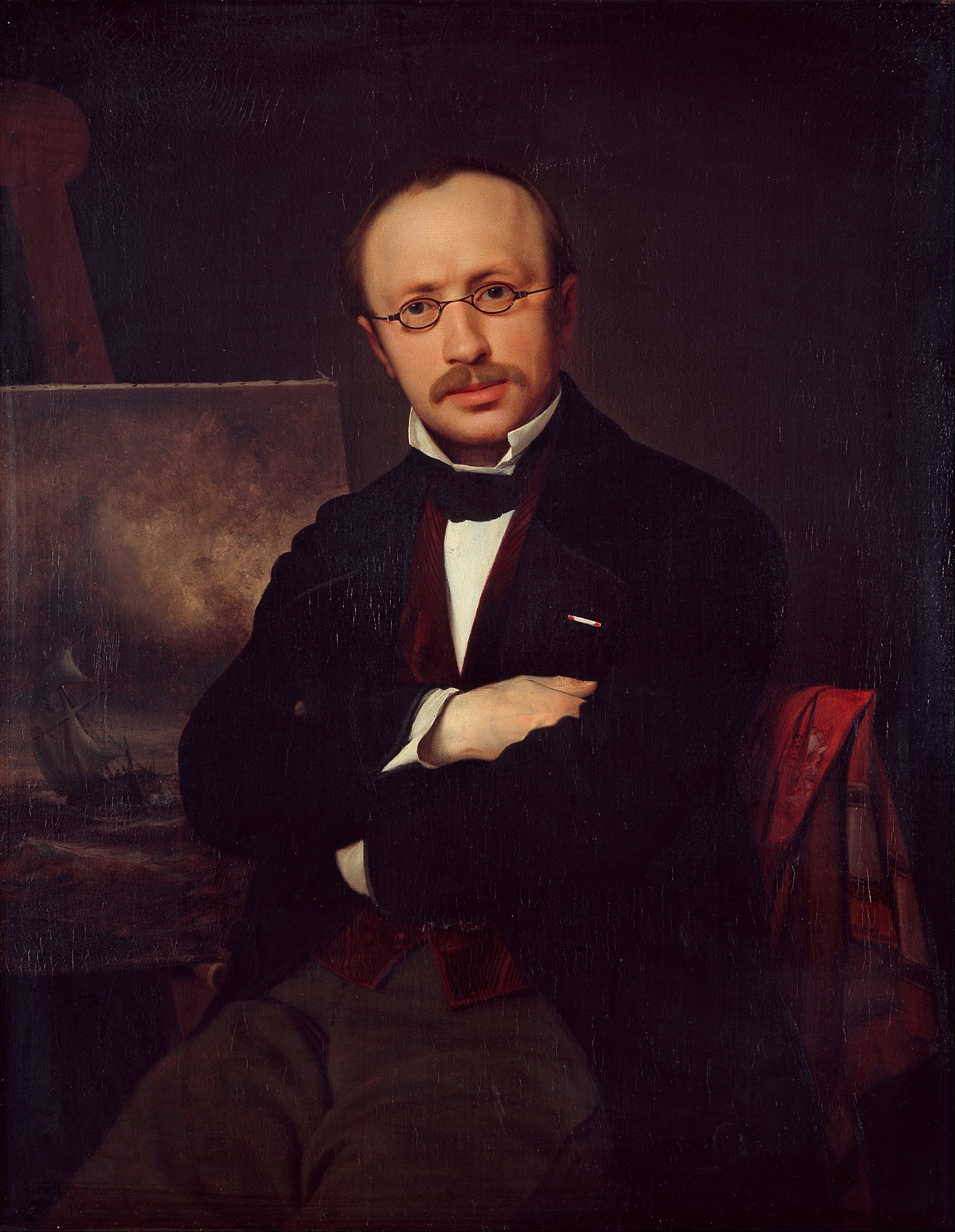
Painter Anton Melbye (1852)

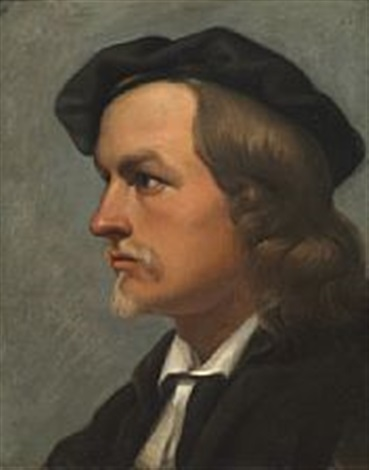
Painter Jens Adolf Jerichau (undated)

== Bibliography ==
- Ulrich Schulte-Wülwer: Malerei in Schleswig-Holstein. Katalog der Gemäldesammlung des Städtischen Museums Flensburg, Boyens, Heide 1989, ISBN 3-8042-0467-8

== See also ==
- Art of Denmark
