= Aastrup Church =

Coordinates: 54°50′52″N 12°05′03″E

- Aastrup Kirke
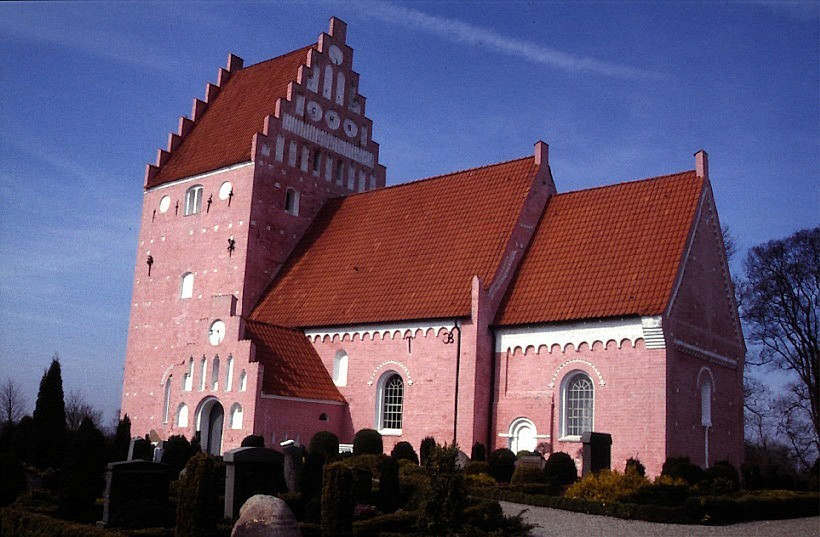
- Aastrup Church
- Location: Aastrup, Falster
- Country: Denmark
- Denomination: Church of Denmark

History
- Founded: ca. 1200

Architecture
- Style: Romanesque architecture, Gothic architecture

Administration
- Diocese: Diocese of Lolland–Falster
- Deanery: Falster Provsti
- Parish: Aastrup Sogn

Aastrup Church (Danish: Aastrup Kirke), located on the top of a steep hill in the village of Aastrup, 6 kilometres (3.7 mi) southwest of Stubbekøbing on the Danish island of Falster, dates from c. 1200. Built in the Late Romanesque style, it has frescos from the 13th and 15th centuries.

== History ==
The church was dedicated to St Anne although this was probably not its original patron as Anne was not generally known in Denmark until the late Middle Ages. The Crown, which enjoyed clerical appointment rights since before the Reformation, sold the church in 1767 to the parish priest, Christian Henrik Biering. In 1810, Peter Hersleb Classen, director of Det Classenske Fideicommis, transferred the church's ownership to the local landowners and in 1919 it became autonomous.

== Architecture ==
The brick chancel and the nave both have round arch friezes below the cornice. The south door, partly bricked up, is still in use but the north door, whose remnants were uncovered in 1984, is completely closed. The nave was extended at the end of the 15th century when cross-vaulting replaced the flat ceiling. The remains of the priest's door can be seen on the south wall of the chancel. The east gable contains a rounded Romanesque window while traces of the other Romanesque windows can be seen in the masonry. The tower with stepped gables, built in the Gothic period, fills the full width of the nave. The porch dates from the same period.

On the nave's eastern gable there is a relief of two heads and on the chancel's east gable, there is a head above the window. These have given rise to a legend about three virgins who had been to church in Horbelev and were murdered when returning home: one in Horbelev, one in Aastrup and the third in Grønsund. The three murderers were the women's brothers who were taken by robbers when they were small children. According to the legend, the three heads in Aastrup are those of the virgins while those on the tower at Horbelev are those of the robbers.

== Interior ==
The Neoclassical altarpiece from 1838 has a painting of Christ at Emmaus by Fritz Westphal. The pulpit carved in the auricular style by Jørgen Ringnis (1645) is similar to those in Toreby and Væggerløse. The 55 cm (22 in) high crucifix from around 1400 used to hang above the chancel arch but is now above the door to the porch. It depicts a thin figure whose thorn-covered head falls to his right shoulder. The arms are long and thin and the hands unnaturally small and stumpy. The church's limestone font is Late Gothic.

== Frescos ==
Frescos in the chancel and the nave from the late 15th century were rediscovered underneath a whitewash in 1901. They are probably the work of the Elmelunde Master and his workshop, although they also appear to have been influenced by the nearby Brarup workshop. They depict scenes from the Creation and the Passion, including Christ bearing his cross, the suicide of Judas, and the rich man and the poor man. In 1943, an older fresco (c. 1275) depicting a Majestas Domini was discovered on the wall above the chancel arch.

== Graveyard ==
Notable burials at the associated graveyard include former principal of Classen's Agricultural School Albert la Cour and agriculturalist Adolph Lacoppidan.

== Gallery ==
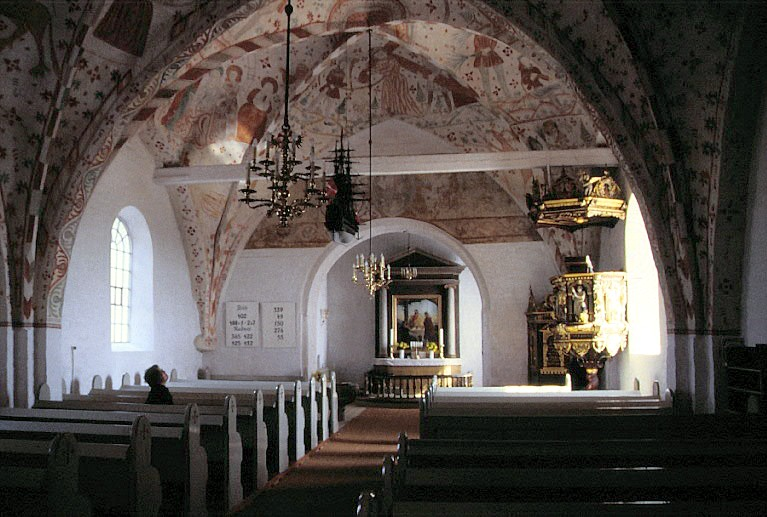
The nave

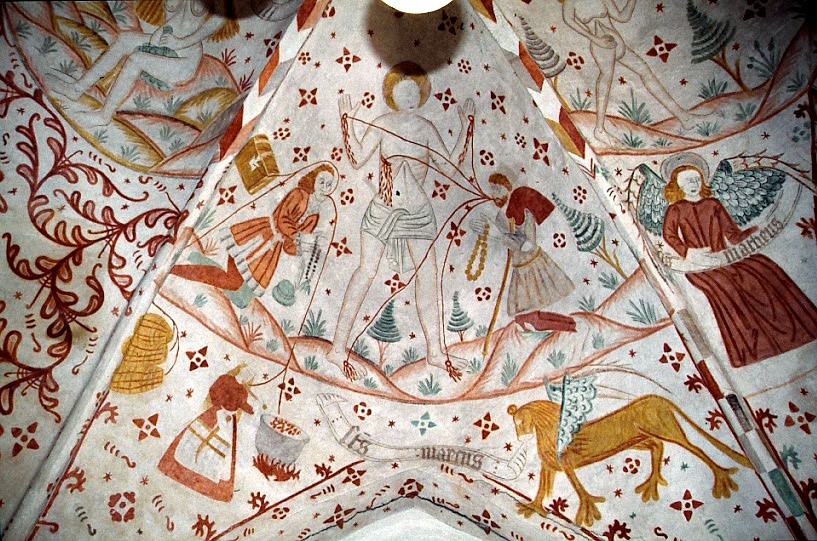
Fresco: the rich man and the poor man

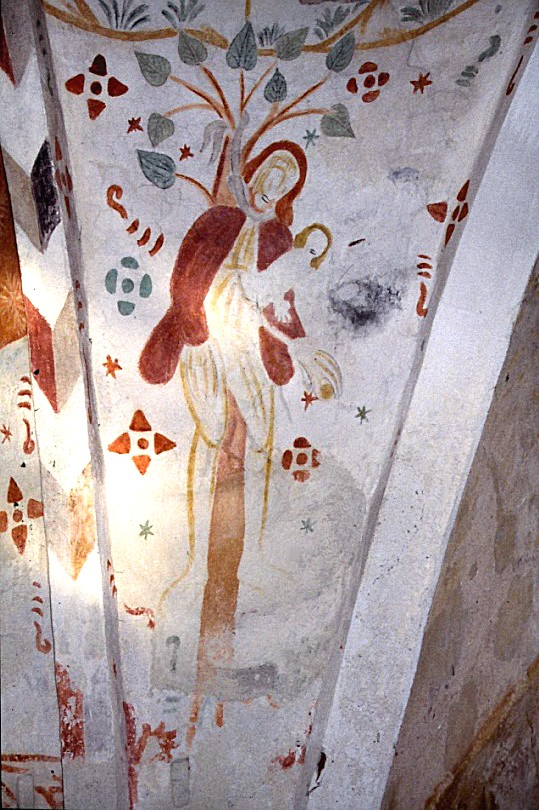
Fresco: Judas' death by suicide

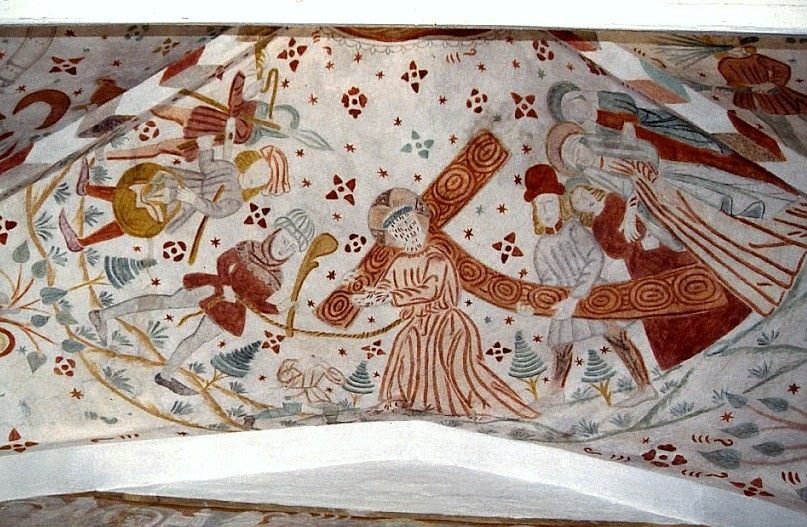
Fresco: Christ bearing the cross

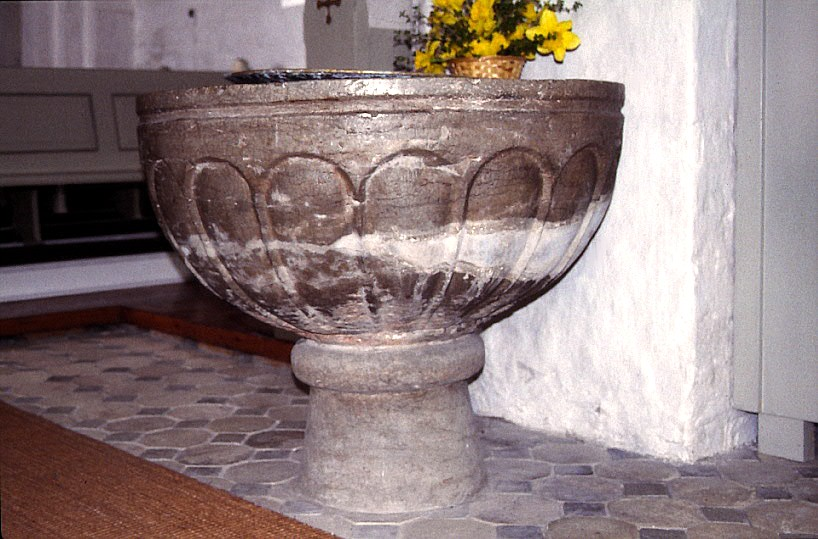
The font
