= Carl Andreas August Goos =

German-Danish painter (1797–1855)

Carl Andreas August Goos (6 August 1797, Schleswig – 12 July 1855, Schleswig) was a German-Danish painter working in history painting, genre painting and portrait painting.
