= Danish Golden Age =

Period in Denmark during the first half of the 19th century

The Danish Golden Age (Danish: guldalderen, lit. 'the golden age') covers a period of exceptional creative production in Denmark, especially during the first half of the 19th century. Although Copenhagen had suffered from fires, bombardment and national bankruptcy, the arts took on a new period of creativity catalysed by Romanticism from Germany. The period is probably most commonly associated with the Golden Age of Danish Painting from 1800 to around 1850 which encompasses the work of Christoffer Wilhelm Eckersberg and his students, including Wilhelm Bendz, Christen Købke, Martinus Rørbye, Constantin Hansen and Wilhelm Marstrand, as well as the sculpture of Bertel Thorvaldsen.

It also saw the development of Danish architecture in the Neoclassical style. Copenhagen, in particular, acquired a new look, with buildings designed by Christian Frederik Hansen and Michael Gottlieb Bindesbøll.

In relation to music, the Golden Age covers figures inspired by Danish romantic nationalism including J. P. E. Hartmann, Hans Christian Lumbye, Niels W. Gade and the ballet master August Bournonville. Literature centred on Romantic thinking, introduced in 1802 by the Norwegian-German philosopher Henrik Steffens. Key contributors were Adam Oehlenschläger, Bernhard Severin Ingemann, N. F. S. Grundtvig and Hans Christian Andersen—the proponent of the modern fairytale. Søren Kierkegaard furthered philosophy while Hans Christian Ørsted achieved fundamental progress in science. The Golden Age thus had a profound effect not only on life in Denmark but, with time, on the international front too.

== Background and context ==
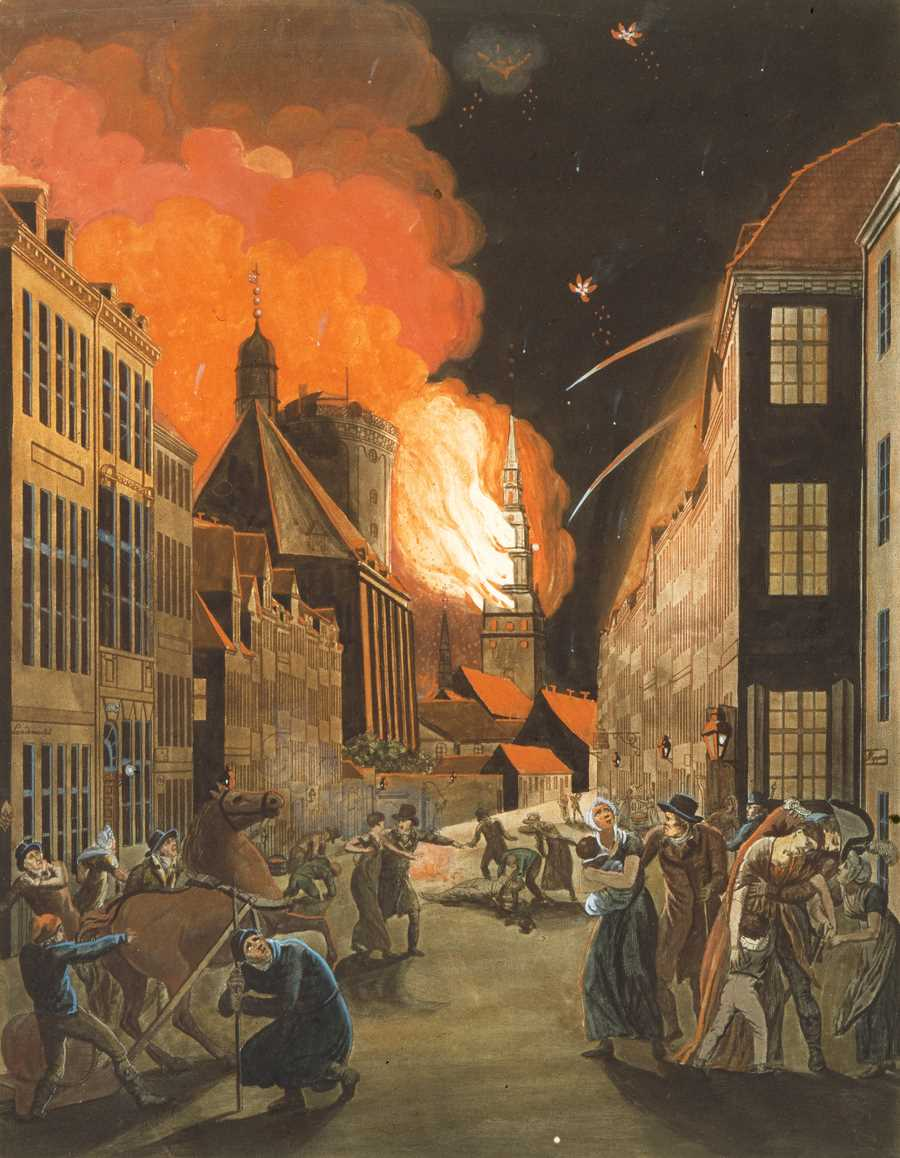
Copenhagen on Fire by C.W. Eckersberg (1807)

The origins of the Golden Age can be traced back to around the beginning of the 19th century, which was a very rough period for Denmark-Norway. Copenhagen, the centre of the country's intellectual life, first experienced huge fires in 1794 and 1795 which destroyed both Christiansborg Palace and large areas of the inner city. In 1801, as a result of the country's involvement in the League of Armed Neutrality, the Royal Navy successfully attacked a Danish fleet at the Battle of Copenhagen. In 1807, on rumours that the French might force Denmark-Norway to close the Baltic to their shipping, the British bombarded Copenhagen, burning large portions of the city. Then in 1813, as a result of the country's inability to support the costs of war, the Dano-Norwegian government declared a state of bankruptcy. To make matters worse, Norway ceased to be part of the Oldenburg realms when it was ceded to Sweden the following year, at the Treaty of Kiel.

These events nevertheless provided new opportunities for Copenhagen. Architects and planners widened the streets, constructing beautifully designed Neoclassical buildings offering a brighter yet intimate look. At the time, with a population of only 100,000, the city was still quite small, built within the confines of the old ramparts. As a result, the leading figures of the day met frequently, sharing their ideas, bringing the arts and the sciences together. Henrik Steffens was perhaps the most effective proponent of the Romantic idea. In a series of lectures in Copenhagen, he successfully conveyed the ideas behind German romanticism to the Danes. Influential thinkers, such as Oehlenschläger and Grundtvig were quick to take up his views. It was not long before Danes from all branches of the arts and sciences were involved in a new era of Romantic nationalism, later known as the Danish Golden Age.

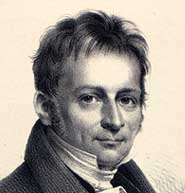
Henrik Steffens (1773–1845) who lectured on German romanticism

Especially in the field of painting, change became apparent. While art had previously served to uphold the monarchy and the establishment, Christoffer Wilhelm Eckersberg and his students realized that, with the arrival of industrialization, the middle classes were increasingly gaining power and influence. Grand historical art gave way to more widely appealing but less pretentious genre paintings and landscapes.

The main period of the Golden Age took place during the first half of the nineteenth century. Around that time, Danish culture suffered from the outbreak of the First Schleswig War (1848–1851) and then the Second one in 1864. In addition, political reforms involving the end of the absolute monarchy in 1848 and the adoption of the Danish constitution the following year signalled the beginning of a new era. Finally, the extension of Copenhagen beyond the old ramparts during the 1850s opened up new horizons for urban expansion.

It was not until 1890 that the Danish philosopher Valdemar Vedel first used the term Guldalderen or Golden Age to describe the period. In 1896, author Vilhelm Andersen saw the Golden Age initiated by Henrich Steffens as the richest period in the cultural history of Denmark.

== Painting ==
Around the beginning of the 19th century, the Golden Age of Danish Painting emerged to form a distinct national style for the first time since the Middle Ages; the period lasted until the middle of the century. It has a style drawing on Dutch Golden Age painting, especially its landscape painting, and depicting northern light that is soft but allows strong contrasts of colour. The treatment of scenes is typically an idealized version of reality, but unpretentiously so, appearing more realist than is actually the case. Interior scenes, often small portrait groups, are also common, with a similar treatment of humble domestic objects and furniture, often of the artist's circle of friends. Little Danish art was seen outside the country (nor, indeed, was it to this day) although the Danish-trained leader of German Romantic painting Caspar David Friedrich was important in spreading its influence in Germany.

A crucial figure was Christoffer Wilhelm Eckersberg, who had studied in Paris with Jacques-Louis David and was further influenced towards Neo-Classicism by the sculptor Bertel Thorvaldsen. Eckersberg taught at the Academy from 1818 to 1853, becoming director from 1827 to 1828, and was an important influence on the following generation, in which landscape painting came to the fore. He taught most of the leading artists of the period, including: Wilhelm Bendz, Albert Küchler, Christen Købke, Vilhelm Kyhn, Jørgen Roed, Holger Roed, Martinus Rørbye, Constantin Hansen, Jorgen Sonne, Bolette Puggaard, Fritz Petzholdt and Wilhelm Marstrand.

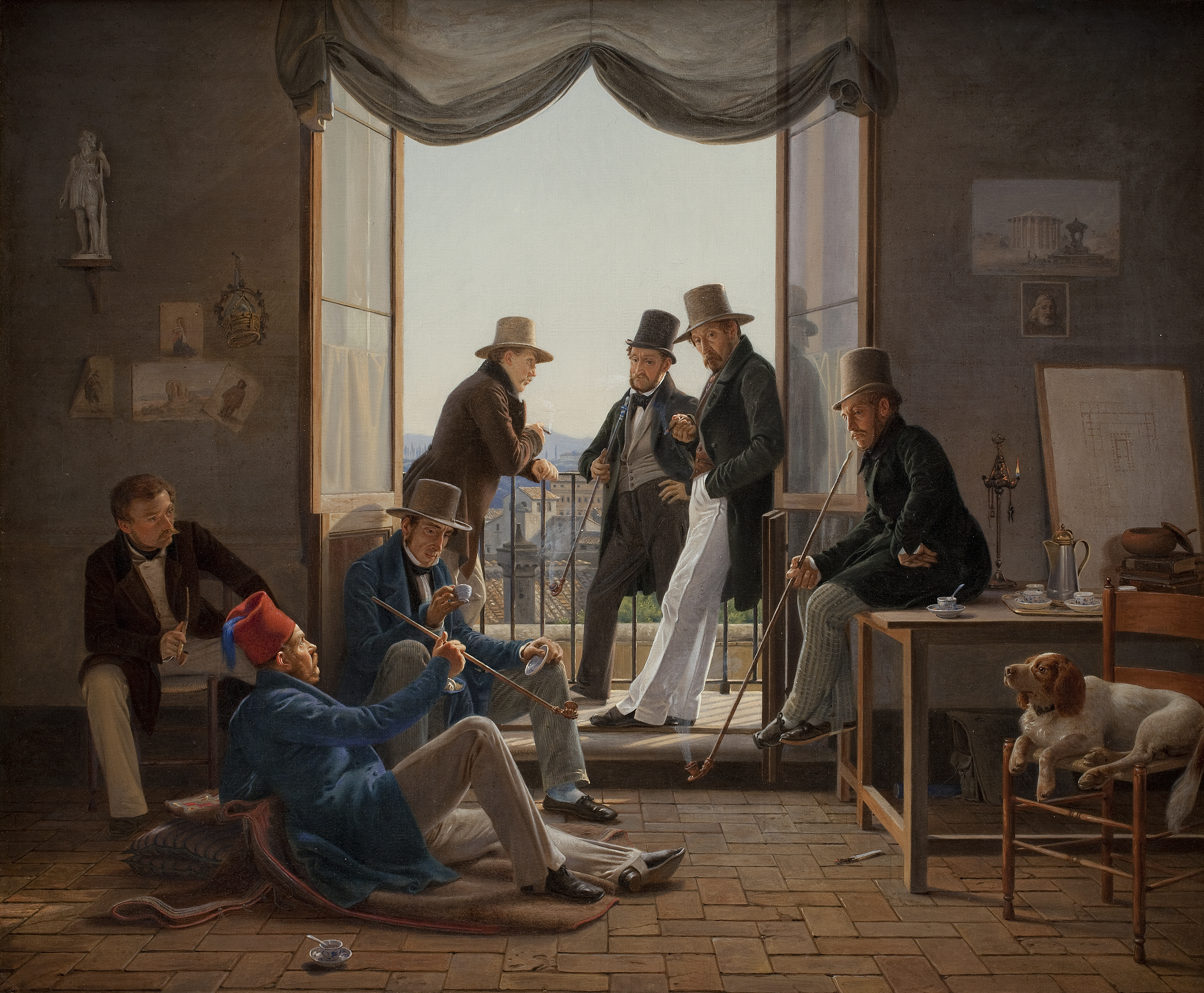
A company of Danish artists in Rome, painted by Constantin Hansen, 1837. Lying on the floor is architect Bindesbøll. From left to right: Constantin Hansen, Martinus Rørbye, Wilhelm Marstrand, Albert Küchler, Ditlev Blunck and Jørgen Sonne.

An investigation of drawings, underdrawings, oil sketches and finished paintings by Eckersberg and his pupils Christen Købke and Constantin Hansen, using their Italian views as examples, points to a number of important aspects which shed light on the creative process in Danish Golden Age painting in the first half of the 19th century. The preliminary drawings – preferably composition drawings – which were done in front of the motif were meticulously constructed and reproduced many details. Architecture received the painters' greatest attention, whereas vegetation, rocks and stones as well as figures in the landscape received a lower priority. The drawing done directly from the motif was squared up in several instances with a view to its transference to the painting, which was often no larger than the drawing. Some elements could be altered during the process, but by and large the artist retained the original dispositions quite precisely. In some cases the architecture was consciously altered so as to strengthen the forms and create harmony in the picture. In this way, we can prove that although the Italian motifs appear realistic at first sight, they were nonetheless adjusted or even manipulated by the artists.

Prominent artists of the Danish Golden Age of Painting included Wilhelm Bendz (1804–1832), remembered for his many technically accomplished portraits of fellow artists such as Ditlev Blunck and Christen Christensen, a scene from the Academy's anatomy class, as well as the group portraits "A Tobacco Party" and "Artist in the Evening at Finck's Coffee House in Munich"; Constantin Hansen (1804–1880), deeply interested in literature and mythology and inspired by Niels Laurits Høyen, who developed national historical painting based on Norse mythology and painted many portraits, including the historical The Constitutional Assembly (Den grundlovgivende Rigsforsamling); Christen Købke (1810–48), influenced by Niels Laurits Høyen, an art historian who promoted a nationalistic approach calling for artists to search for subject matter in the folk life of their country instead of searching for themes in other countries such as Italy; Wilhelm Marstrand (1810–1873), a vastly productive artist who mastered a remarkable variety of genres, remembered especially for a number of his works which have become familiar signposts of Danish history and culture: scenes from the drawing-rooms and streets of Copenhagen during his younger days; the festivity and public life captured in Rome; the many representative portraits of citizens and innovators; even the monumentalist commissions for universities and the monarchy; and Martinus Rørbye (1803–1848), remembered for his genre paintings of Copenhagen, for his landscapes and for his architectural paintings, as well as for the many sketches he made during his travels to countries rarely explored at the time. Among other artists, C.A. Jensen (1792–1870) specialized almost exclusively in portraits and stands out for his particularly lively portraits of some his leading contemporaries.

At the end of the period painting style, especially in landscape art, became caught up in the political issue of the Schleswig-Holstein Question, a vital matter for Danes, but notoriously impenetrable for most others in Europe. But it was not until the 1870s when a number of young artists defied the Academy and studied in Paris that a new style embracing Realism and Impressionism began to emerge.

=== Landscape painting ===
The art historian Niels Laurits Høyen who taught at the Academy encouraged his students to turn to landscape painting. Johan Thomas Lundbye, Christen Købke, P. C. Skovgaard, Dankvart Dreyer, Louis Gurlitt and Martinus Rørbye were among those who developed a new approach to the genre, concentrating on scenes from the Danish countryside.

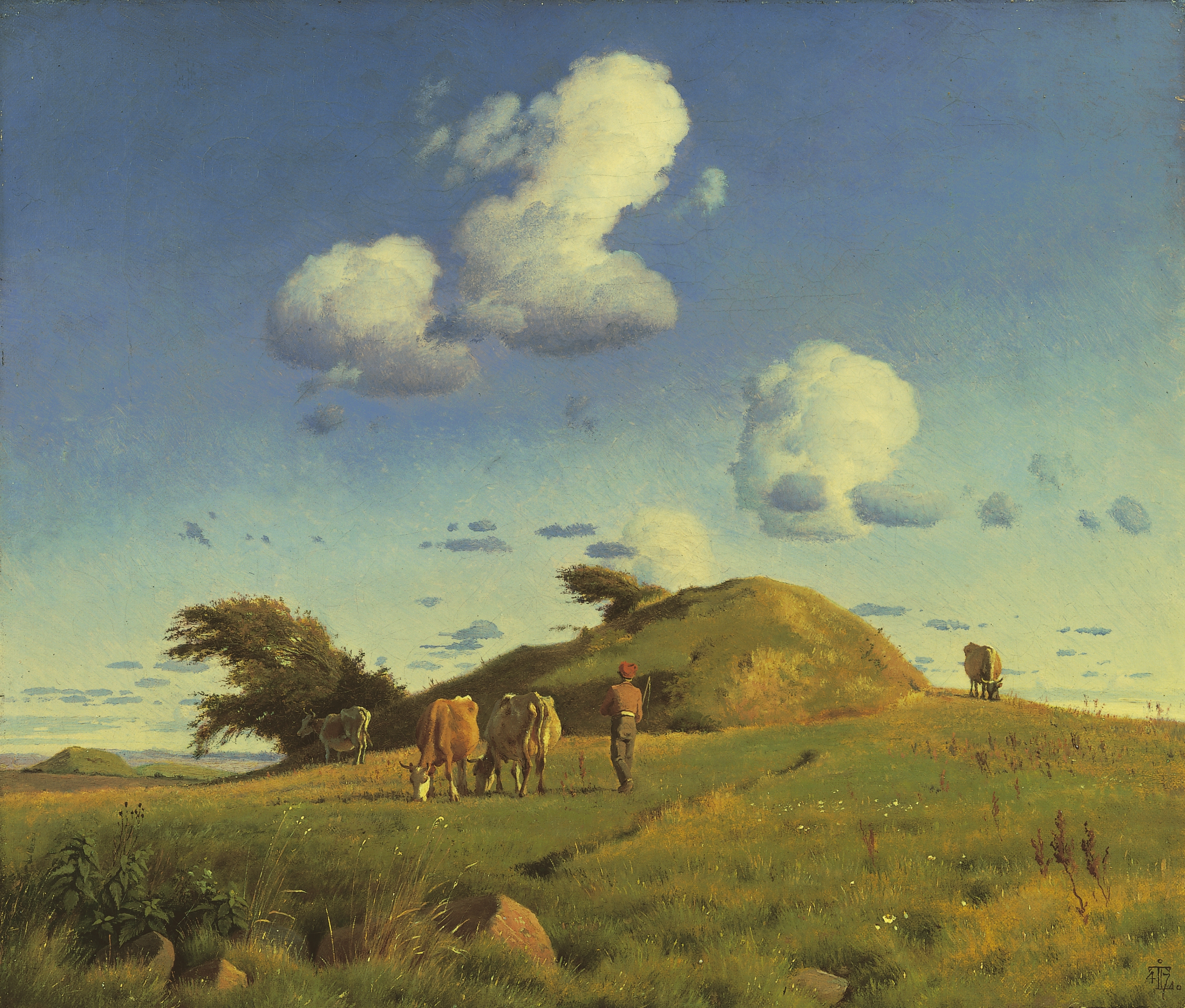
Hankehøj by Johan Thomas Lundbye (1847)

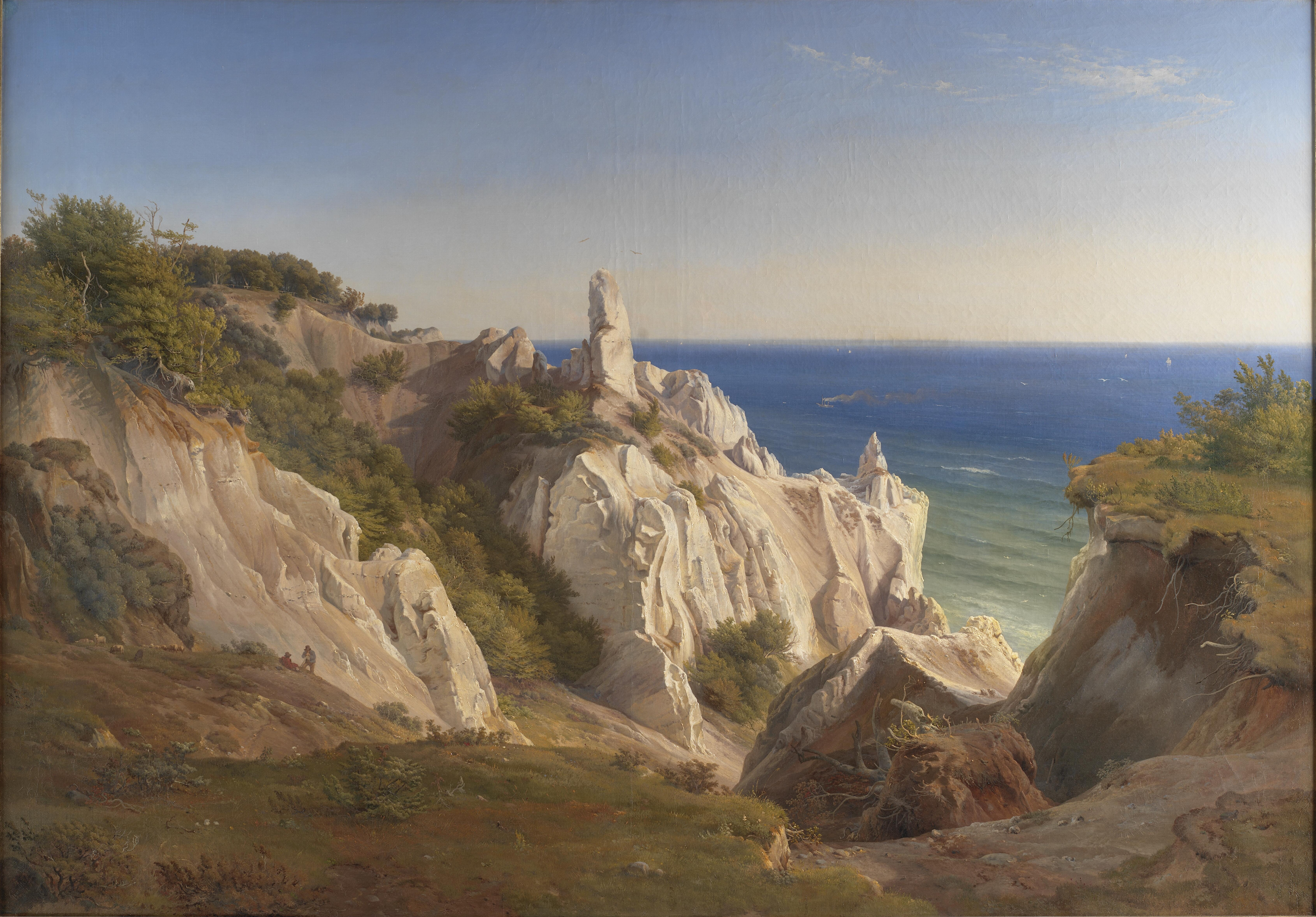
Møns Klint by Louis Gurlitt (1842)

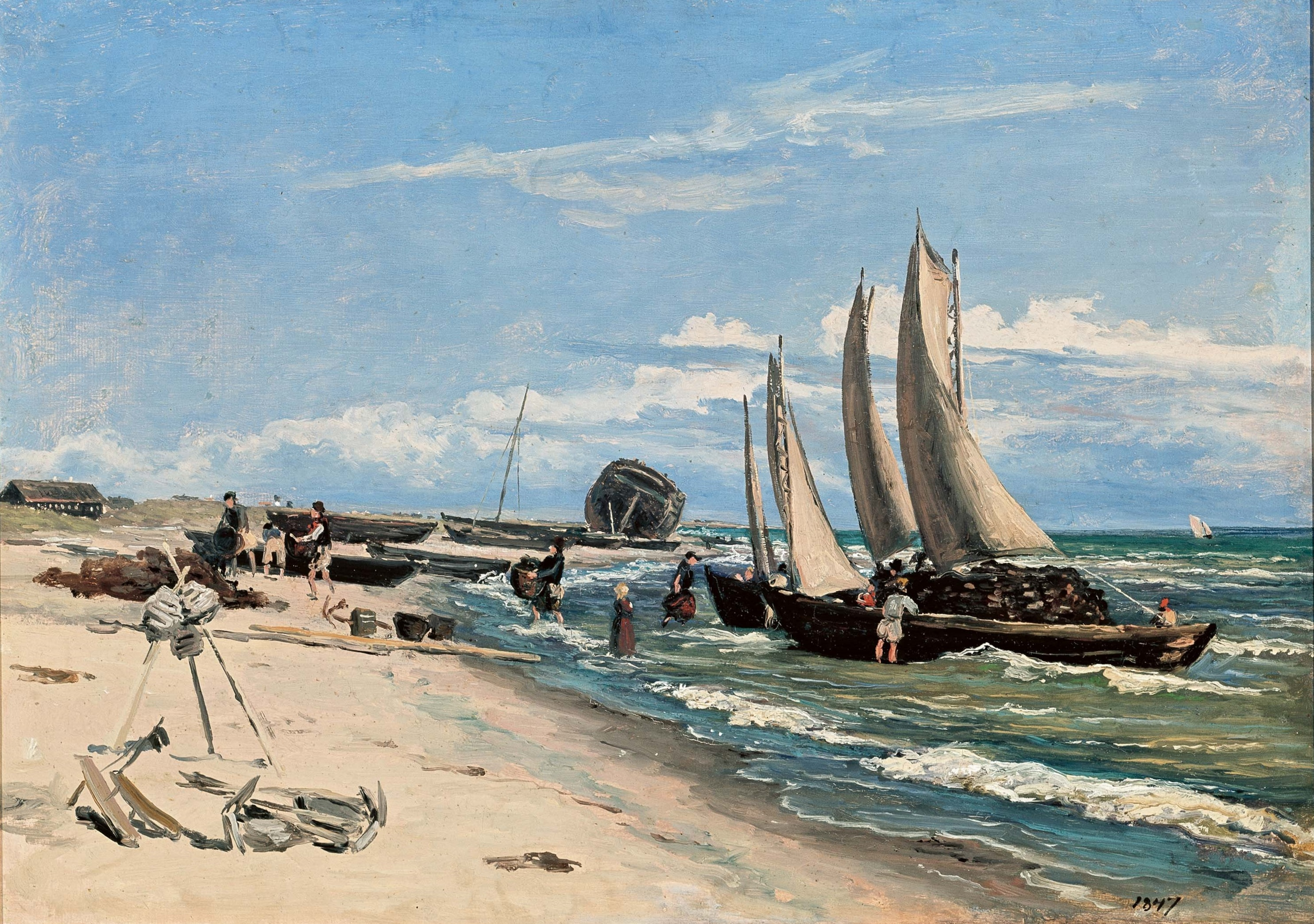
The beach at Skagen Vesterby by Martinus Rørbye (1847)

View over Vejle by P. C. Skovgaard (1852)

=== Genre painting and portraits ===
A new type of genre painting also emerged during the Golden Age. Interiors depicting the middle and upper classes in the right settings were a favorite motif. Portraits followed the same pattern.

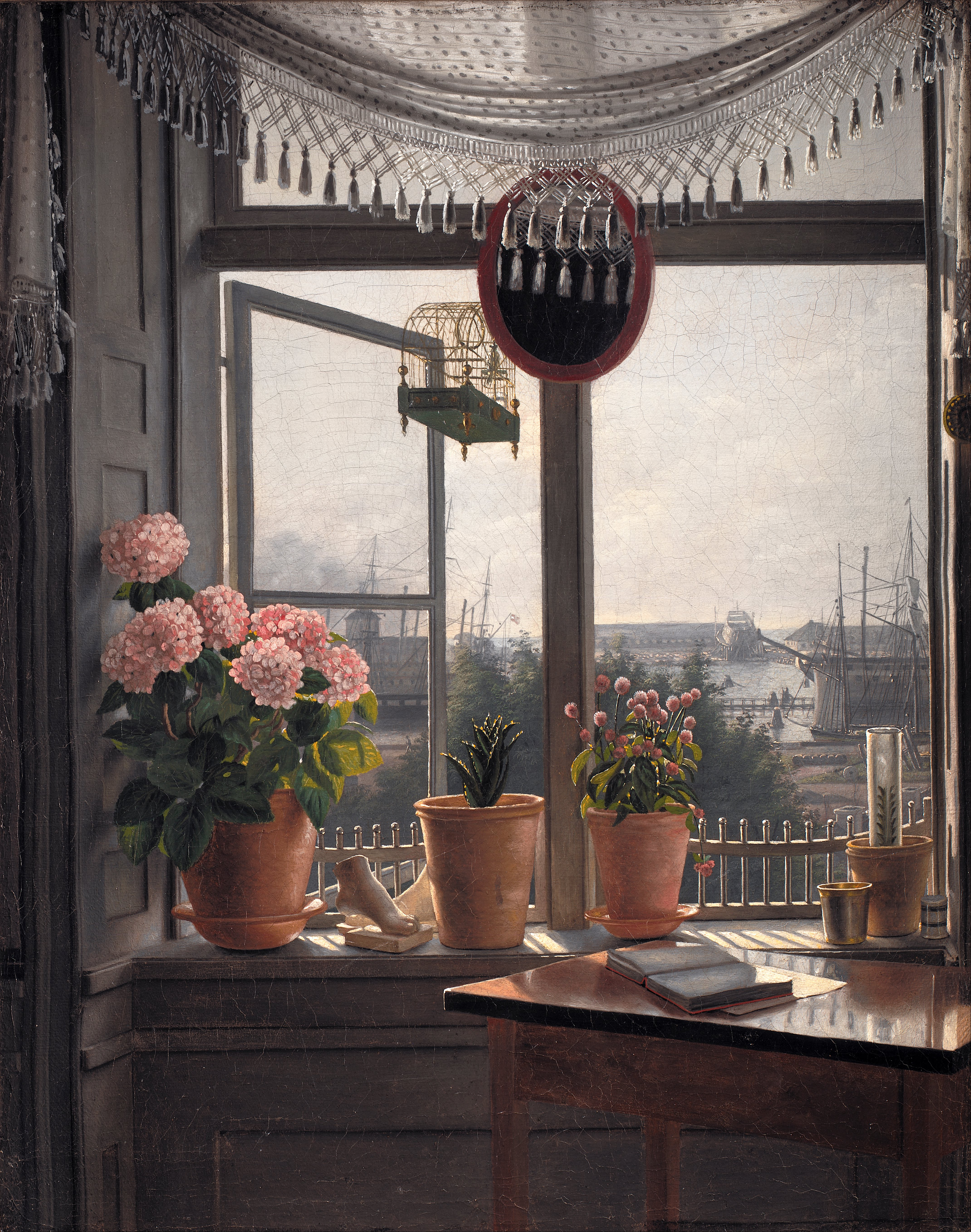
View from the Artist's Window by Martinus Rørbye (1825)

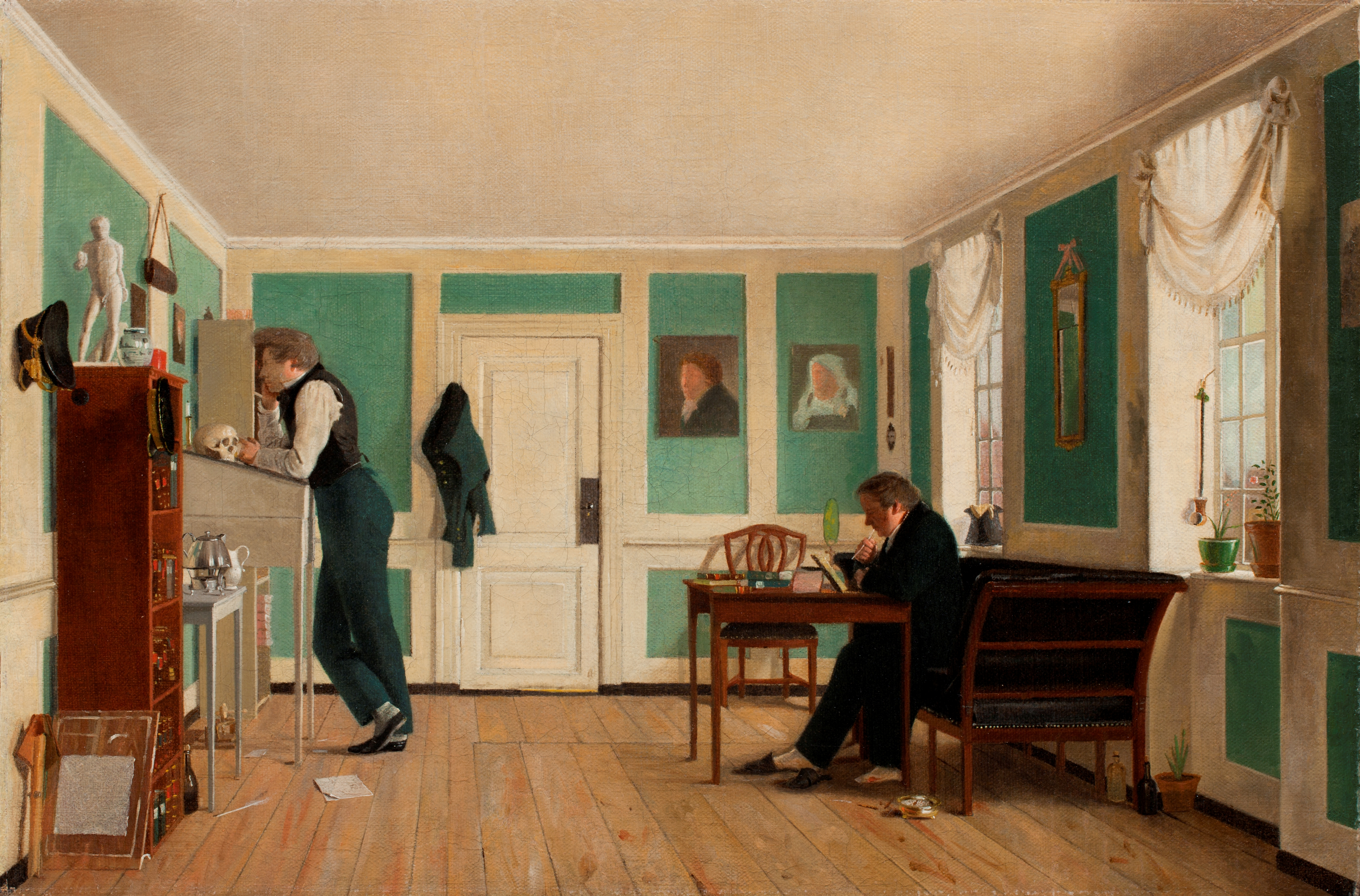
Interior on Amaliegade by Wilhelm Bendz (1826)

Model class at the Danish Academy by Wilhelm Bendz (1826)

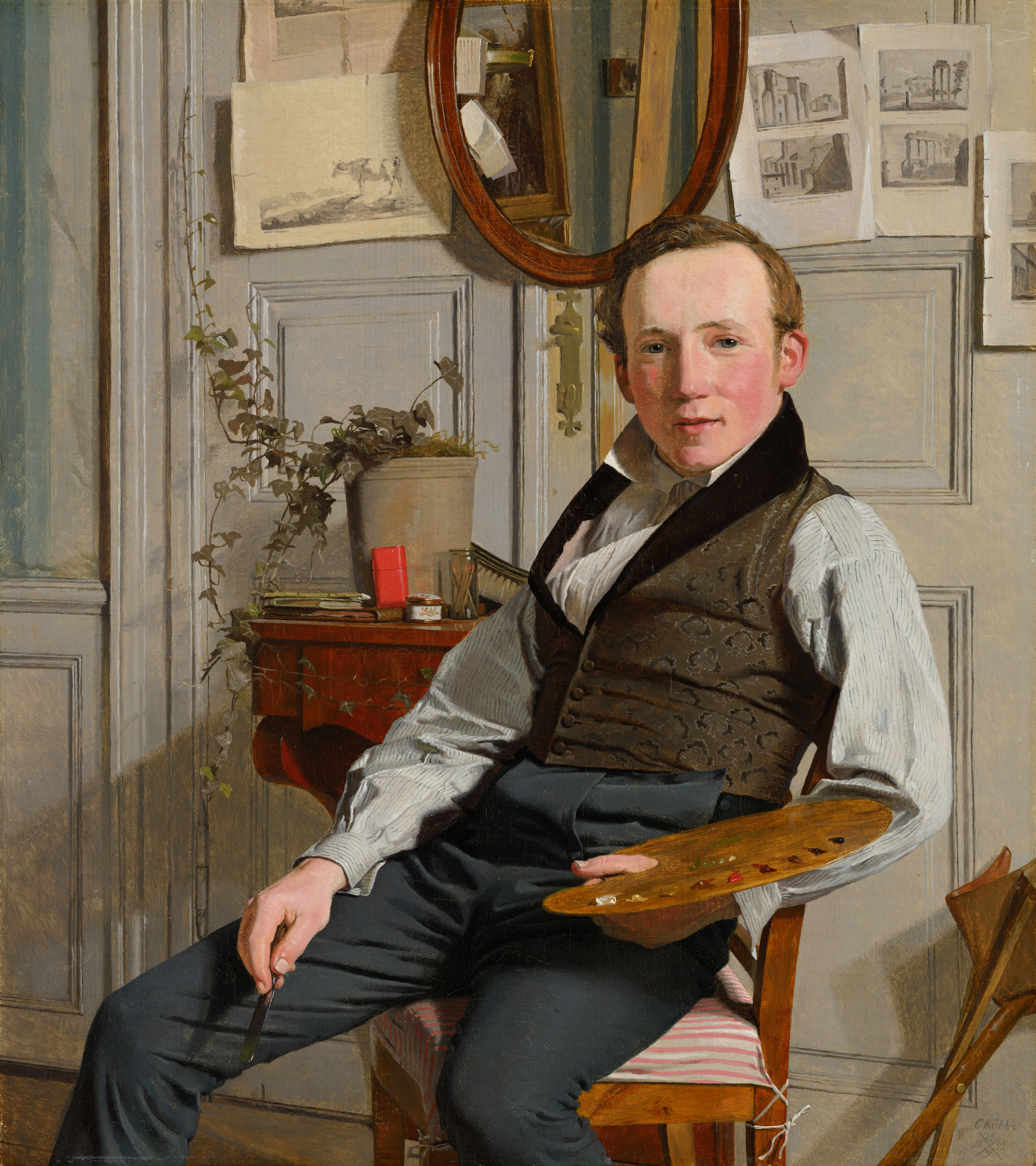
Portrait of Frederik Sødring by Christen Købke (1832)

== Sculpture ==
Bertel Thorvaldsen, strongly influenced by his lengthy stay in Rome from 1797, created many internationally recognized works in his pure Neoclassical style. His breakthrough was Jason with the Golden Fleece which was highly praised by Antonio Canova and purchased by Thomas Hope, a wealthy British art collector. Other well-known works are the large Statue of Christ in Copenhagen Cathedral and the Lion Monument in Lucerne. Many of his works can be seen in Copenhagen's Thorvaldsens Museum which was not completed until 1848, four years after his death.

Other contributors to sculpture in the Golden Age include Hermann Ernst Freund, whose work centred on Scandinavian gods, and Herman Wilhelm Bissen, who sculpted contemporary figures such as Landsoldaten (The Foot Soldier), a victory monument to the war of 1848–1851.

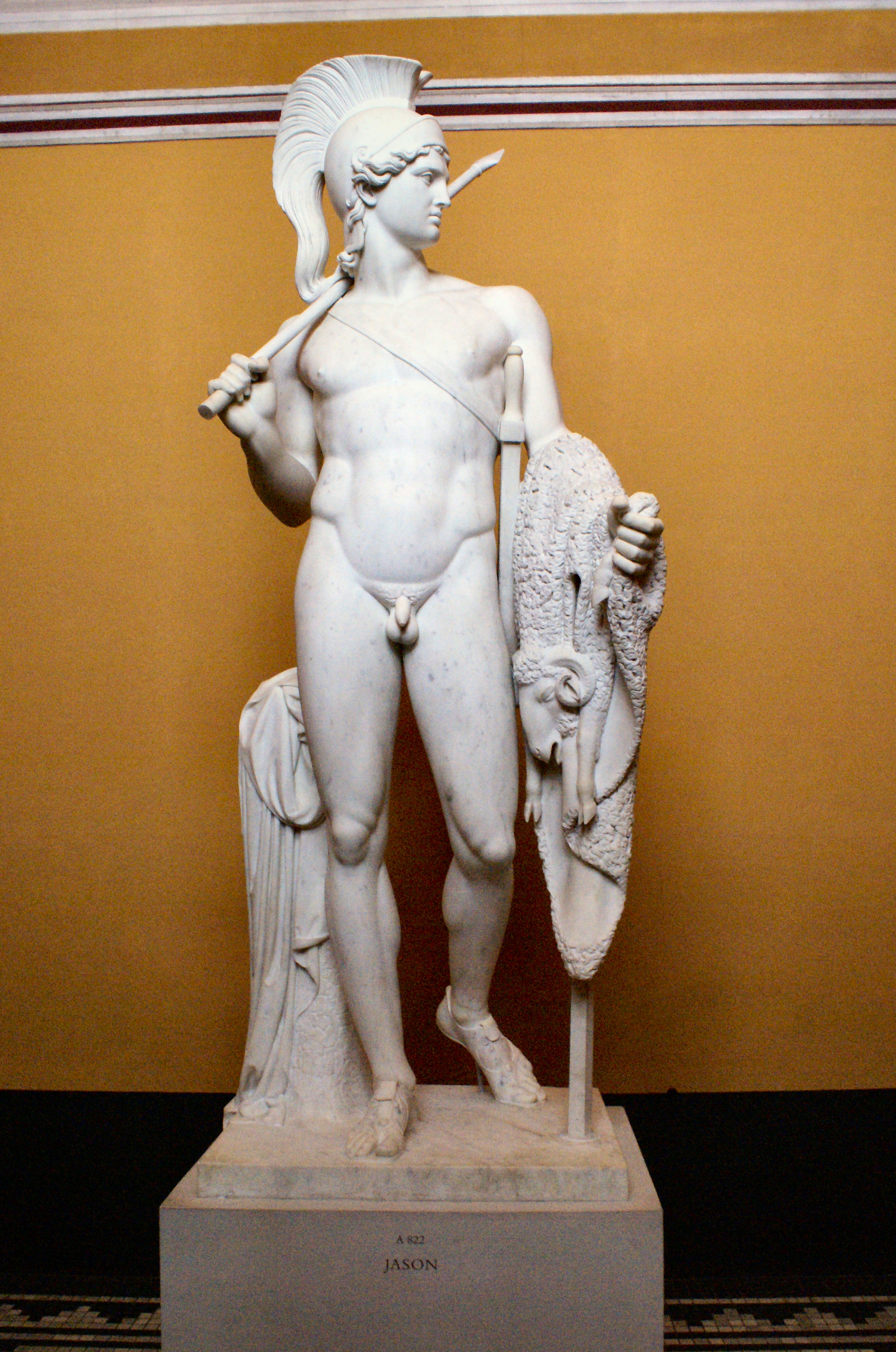
Jason with the Golden Fleece by Bertel Thorvaldsen (1802–03)

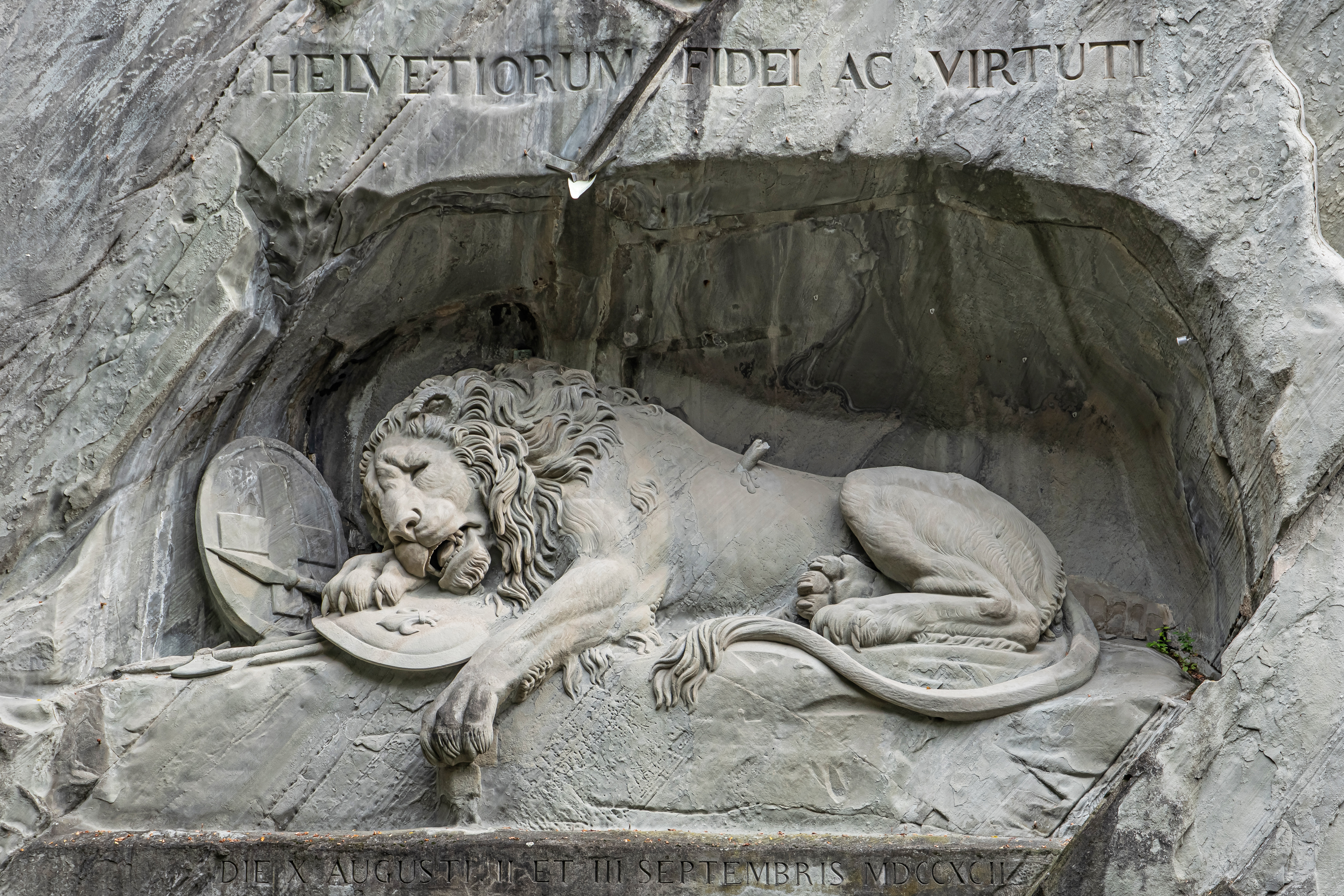
The Lion Monument by Bertel Thorvaldsen (1819)

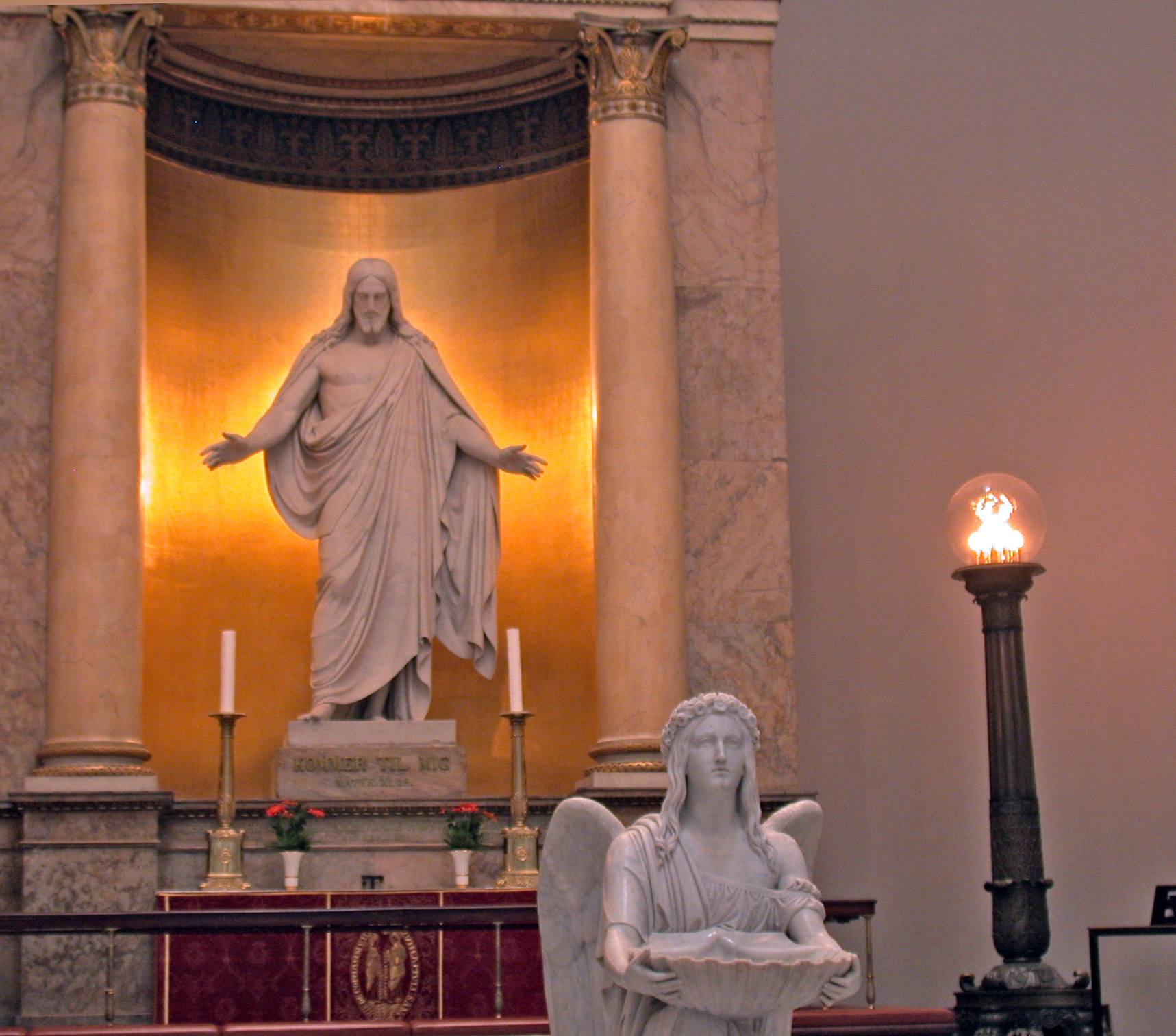
Statue of Christ in Copenhagen Cathedral by Berthel Thorvaldsen (1838)

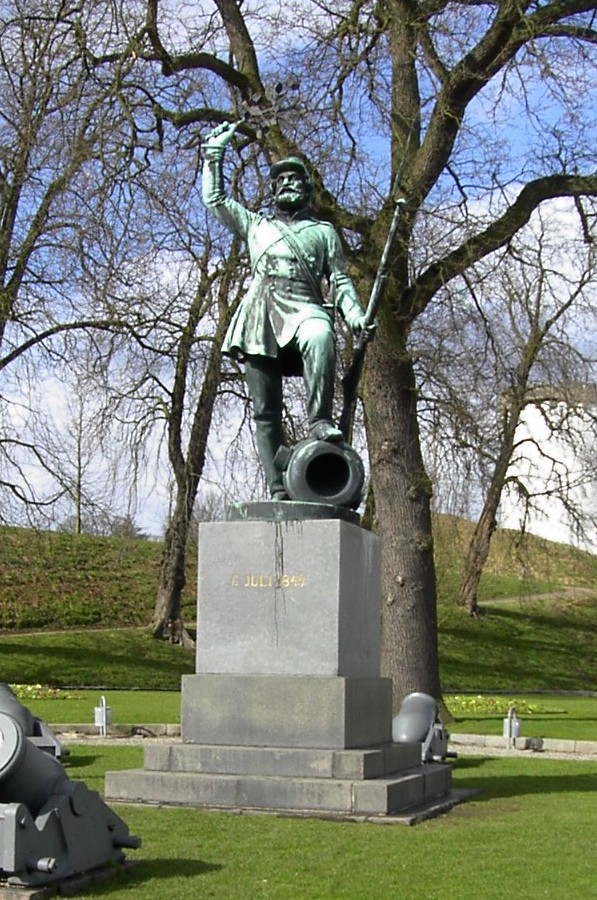
The Foot Soldier by Herman Wilhelm Bissen (1858)

== Architecture ==
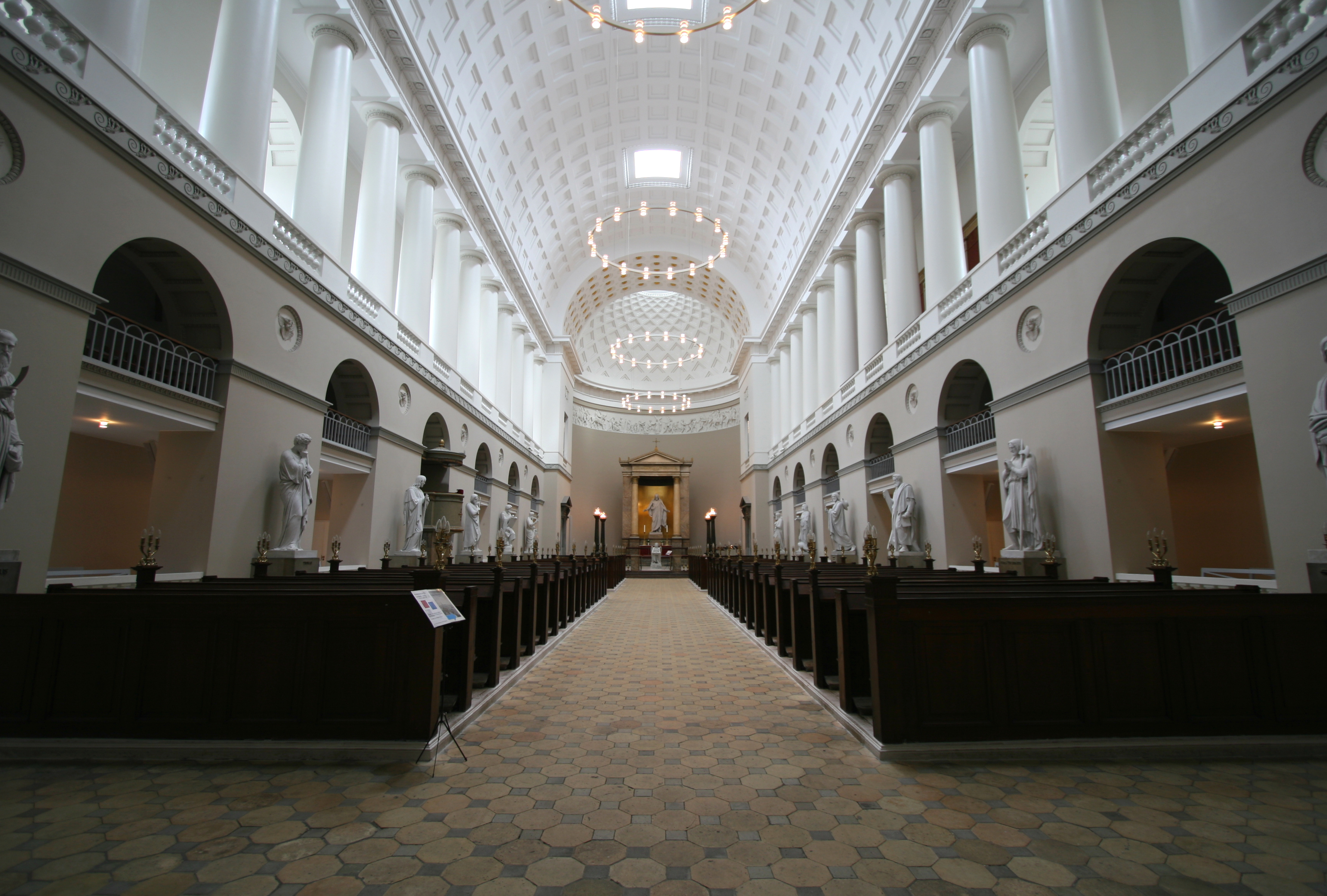
Cathedral Church of Our Lady, Copenhagen by C.F. Hansen (1829), statues by Bertel Thorvaldsen

During the Golden Age, Copenhagen in particular acquired a new look as architects inspired by neo-classicism repaired much of the damage caused by fire in 1795 and by the British bombardment of the city in 1807.

Building on the experience of C. F. Harsdorff in the late 18th century, the main proponent of Classicism in the Golden age was Christian Frederik Hansen who developed a rather severe style with clean, simple forms and large, unbroken surfaces inspired by the architecture of ancient Greece and Rome. From 1800, he was in charge of all major building projects in Copenhagen where he designed the Copenhagen City Hall & Courthouse (1805–1815) on Nytorv. He was also responsible for rebuilding the Church of Our Lady (Vor Frue Kirke) and designing the surrounding square (1811–1829).

In 1800, Hansen was also charged with rebuilding Christiansborg Palace which had burnt down in 1794. He worked with Gustav Friedrich Hetsch who completed the interiors. Unfortunately, the palace burnt down once again in 1884. All that remains is the magnificent chapel which, with its Ionic columns, conveys a sense of antiquity.

Michael Gottlieb Bindesbøll is remembered above all for designing Thorvaldsens Museum. In 1822, as a young man, he had experienced Karl Friedrich Schinkel's classicism in Germany and France and had met the German-born architect and archaeologist Franz Gau who introduced him to the colourful architecture of antiquity. His uncle, Jonas Collin, who was an active art and culture official under Frederick VI, awakened the King's interest in a museum for Bertel Thorvaldsen, the Danish-Icelandic sculptor, and asked Bindesbøll to make some sketches for the building. As Bindensbøll's designs stood out from those of other architects, he was given a commission to transform the Royal Carriage Depot and Theatre Scenery Painting Building into a museum. Emulating the construction of the Erechtheion and the Parthenon as freestanding buildings released from the traditional urban plan of closed streets, he completed the work in 1848.

Andreas Hallander and Johan Martin Quist were among those who rebuilt the houses in the older sections of Copenhagen which had been destroyed by fire.

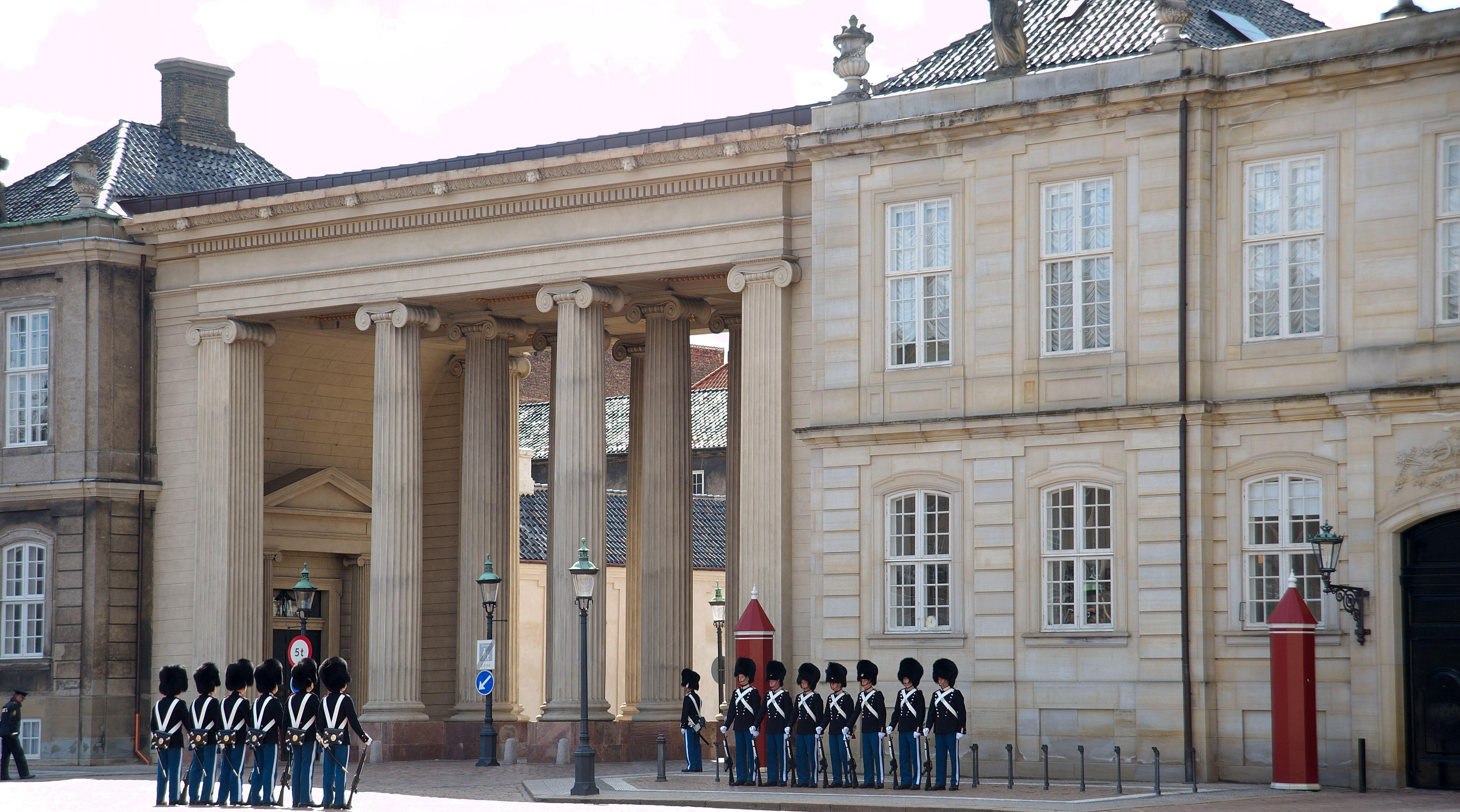
Colonnade at Amalienborg Palace (1794–1795) by C. F. Harsdorff

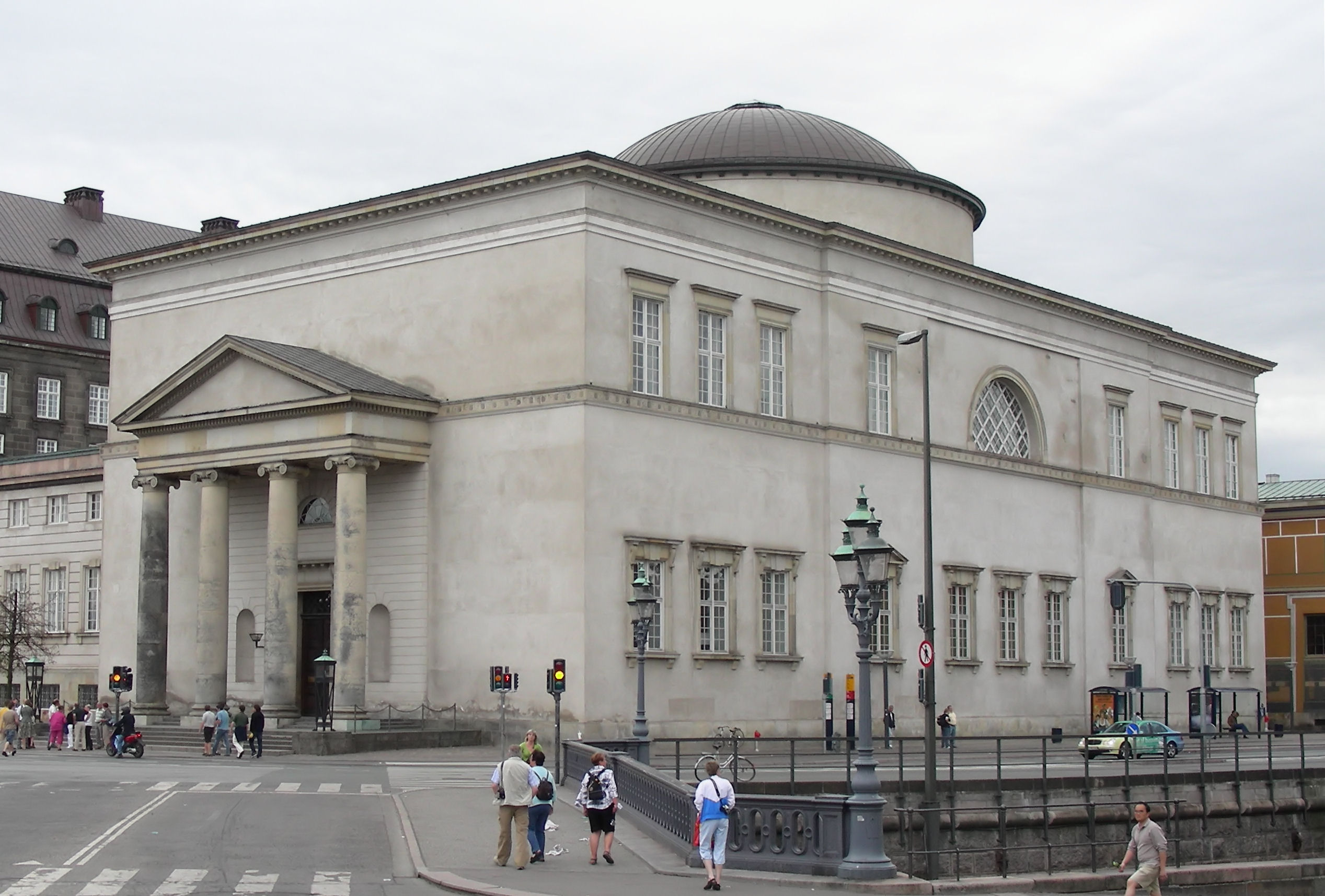
Christiansborg Palace Chapel by C.F. Hansen (1813–26)

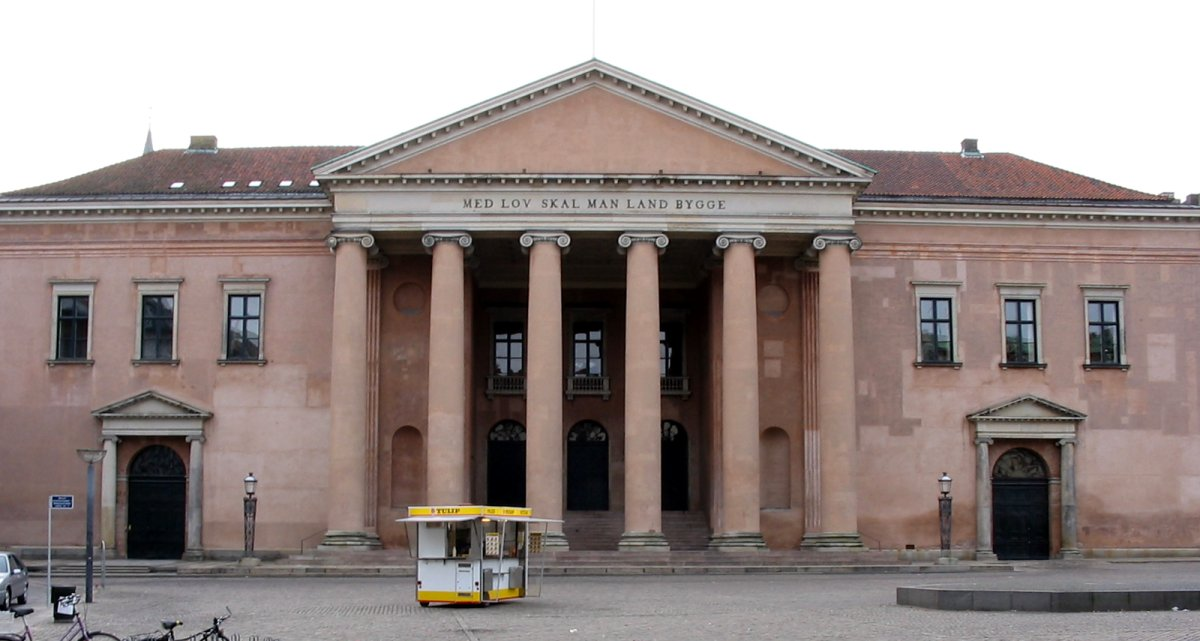
Copenhagen Court House (1815), designed by Christian Frederik Hansen

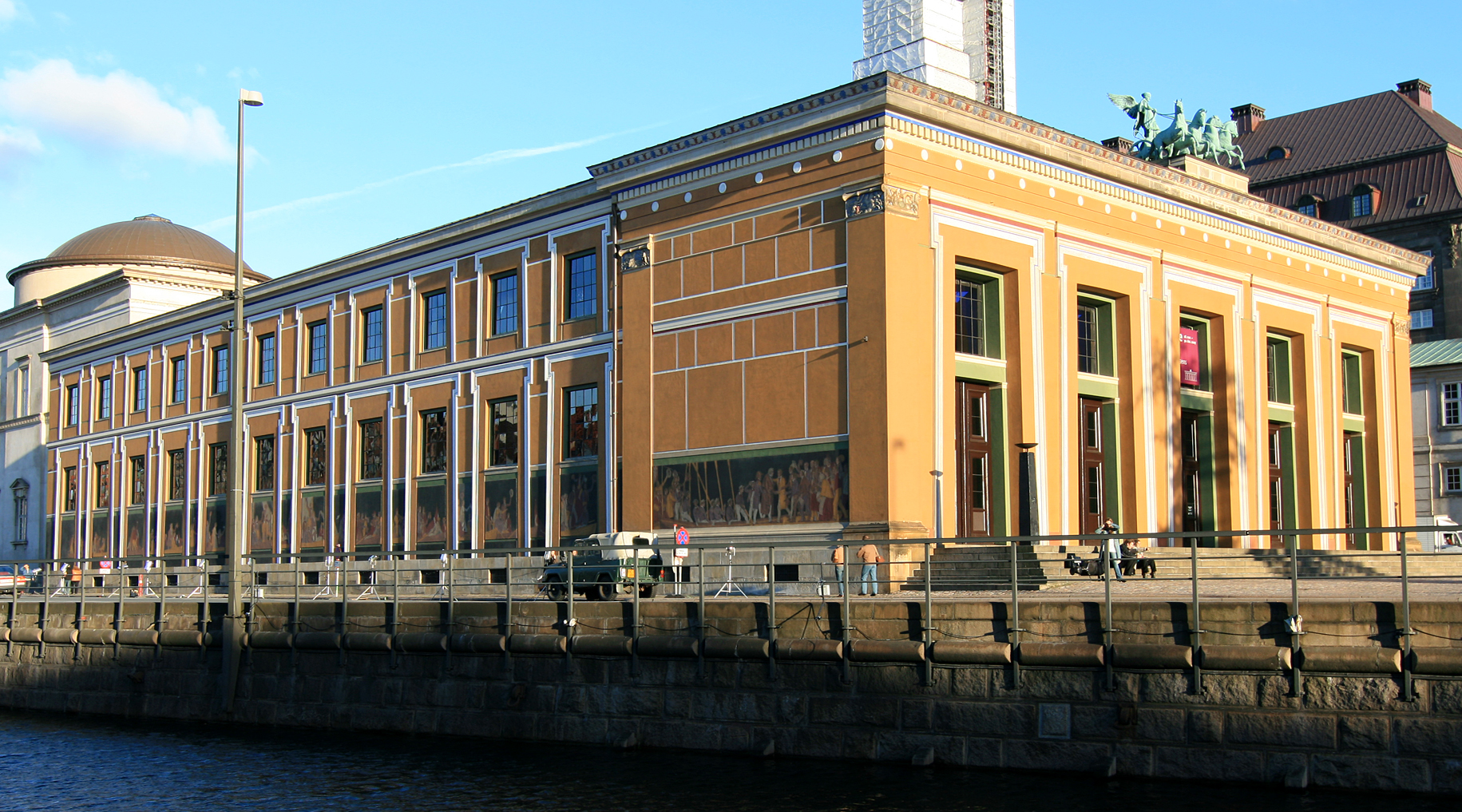
Thorvaldsens Museum by Michael Gottlieb Bindesbøll (1838–48)

== Music and ballet ==
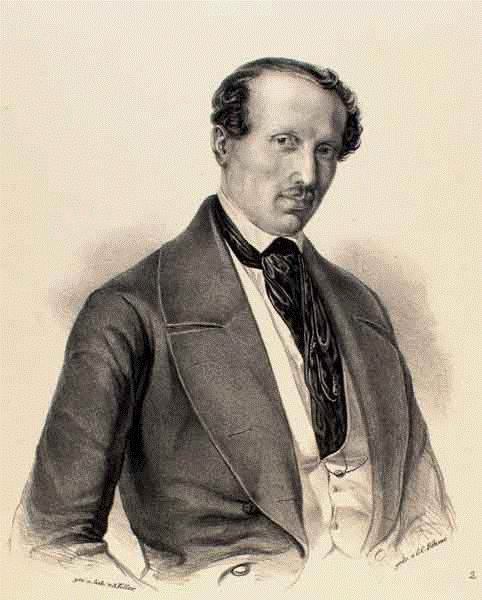
Hans Christian Lumbye (1810–1874)

The 19th century also saw the emergence of a number of Danish composers who were inspired by Romantic nationalism.

Johan Peter Emilius Hartmann (1805–1900) contributed to song and the piano repertory as well as to opera and ballet music. From 1843 until his death, he was the organist at the Church of Our Lady in Copenhagen. His works are not only romantic but generally inspired by the old Nordic legends. They had a strong influence on a later generation of composers such as Edvard Grieg, Carl Nielsen and Peter Erasmus Lange-Muller. Hartmann's wife, Emma Hartmann, was herself a notable composer.

Hans Christian Lumbye (1810–1874) was employed as the first music director at the Copenhagen amusement park Tivoli when it opened in 1843. Here he had a platform for presenting a large foreign and Danish repertory, including his many waltzes and gallops. In 1839, he had heard a Viennese orchestra play music by Johann Strauss, after which he composed in the same style, eventually earning the nickname "The Strauss of the North". One of his most popular pieces, associated with Tivoli, is Champagnegaloppen (the Champagne Galop), which starts with the happy sound of a champagne cork popping. It has been used in several Danish films including Reptilicus (1961), and Champagnegaloppen (1938).

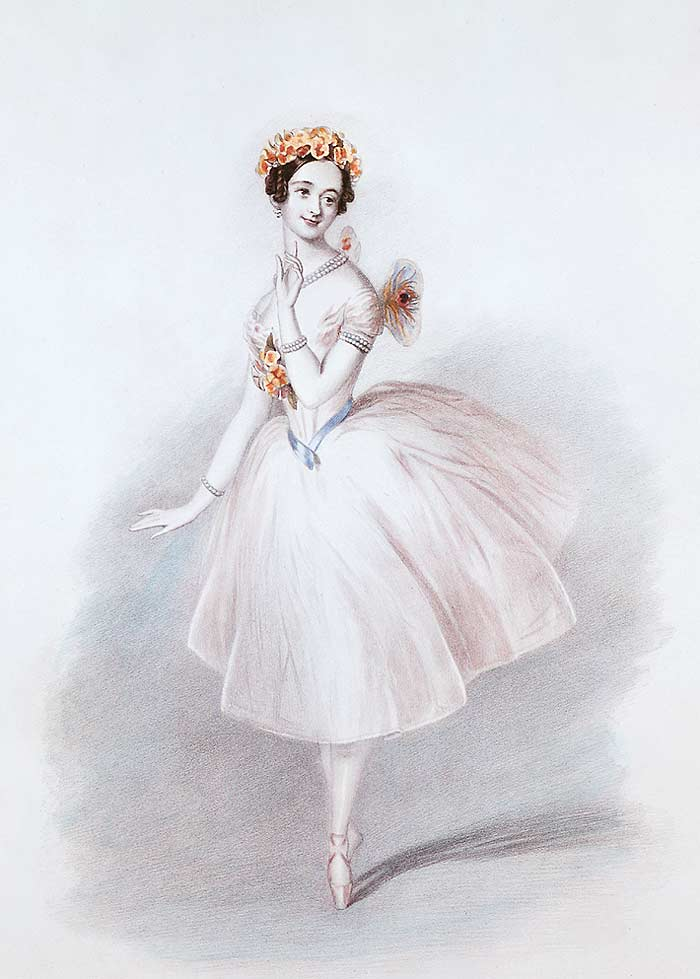
Marie Taglioni in Bournonville's La Sylphide

Niels W. Gade (1817–1890) participated in the development of Musikforeningen (the Music Society) which had been founded in 1836 with the purpose of extending and improving the understanding of classical music. He became its conductor in 1850, and under his management a number of masterpieces of choral music were given their first performance in Denmark, among them Bach's St. Matthew Passion in 1875. At the conservatory in Copenhagen, Gade helped teach future generations, including Edvard Grieg and Carl Nielsen. In the spirit of Romantic nationalism, he composed eight symphonies, a violin concerto, chamber music, organ and piano pieces and a number of large-scale cantatas, among them Elverskud, the most famous Danish work of its kind.

A second generation of significant composers of this period include Peter Heise, Emil Hartmann, Asger Hamerik, August Winding or C.F.E. Horneman.

=== Ballet ===
A major contributor to the ballet scene during the Golden Age was August Bournonville (1805–1879), the celebrated ballet master. From 1830 to 1877, he was the choreographer at the Royal Danish Ballet, for which he created more than fifty ballets admired for their exuberance, lightness, and beauty. He created a style which, although influenced by the Paris ballet, is entirely his own. Bournonville's best-known works are La Sylphide (1836), Napoli (1842), Le Conservatoire (1849), The Kermesse in Bruges (1851) and A Folk Tale (1854). He drew on a number of different composers including Holger Simon Paulli, Johan Peter Emilius Hartmann and Niels Gade. The ballets are widely performed today, not only in Denmark but worldwide, especially in the United States.

== Literature and philosophy ==
Literature

During Denmark's Golden Age, literature centred on Romantic thinking. It was introduced in 1802 by the philosopher Henrik Steffens who gave a successful series of lectures at Elers Kollegium. He presented the main themes of German romanticism, emphasising the relationship between nature, history and mankind. The movement was maintained by the romanticists, especially Adam Oehlenschläger (1779–1850). Remembered today for his Digte (1803) and Poetiske Skrifter (1805), Oehlenschläger quickly became the leading poet in Denmark. Bernhard Severin Ingemann (1789–1862) also published a collection of romantic poems before producing first a number of plays, then a successful series of novels and finally a number of fine religious poems which, after being set to music, became an important addition to the hymns sung in Danish churches.

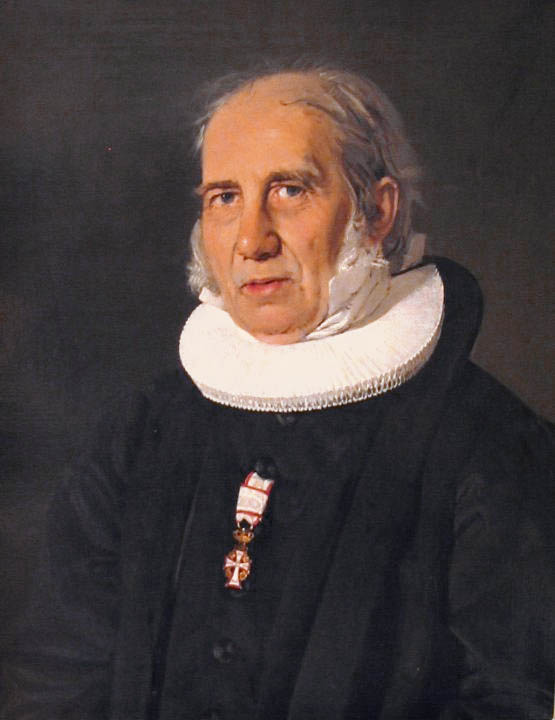
N. F. S. Grundtvig by Christian Albrecht Jensen

One of the most important figures in Danish literary culture was N. F. S. Grundtvig (1783–1872) who instilled a growing spirit of nationalism based initially on his Northern Mythology (1808) and his long drama, The Fall of the Heroic Life in the North (1809). In addition to a huge stream of articles and poems, he wrote a number of books, including two histories of the world (1814 and 1817), the long historical poem Roskilde-Riim (Rhyme of Roskilde) (1813), and a book-sized commentary, Roskilde Saga. Grundtvig's hymn book brought about a great change in Danish church services, substituting the hymns of the national poets for the slow measures of the orthodox Lutherans. In all Grundtvig wrote or translated about 1,500 hymns, including "God's Word Is Our Great Heritage", most of which are still frequently sung today.

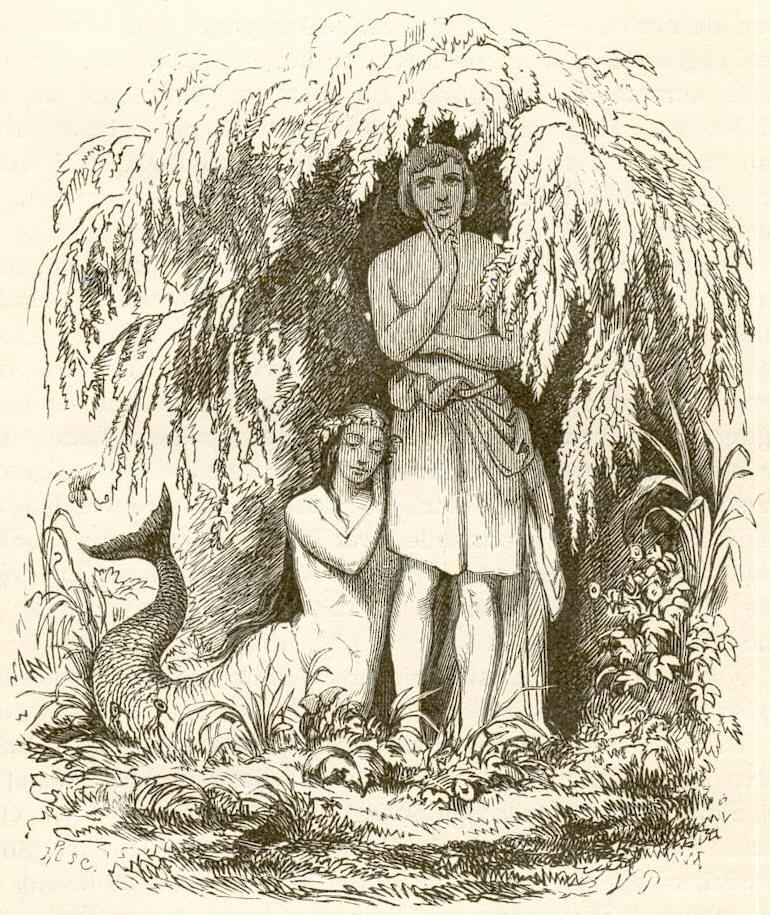
The Little Mermaid: illustration by Vilhelm Pedersen

Hans Christian Andersen (1805–1875) is remembered first and foremost for his fairy tales, written between 1835 and 1872 not only for children but for adults too. Among the most popular are "The Steadfast Tin Soldier", "The Snow Queen", "The Little Mermaid", "Thumbelina", "The Little Match Girl", and "The Ugly Duckling". Considered to be the father of the modern fairytale, Andersen wrote a total of 156 fairy stories, only 12 of which drew on folk tales. But Andersen also wrote a number of travel sketches, several novels including the well-received: "The Improvisatore" (1835), a series of poems, and his autobiography "The Fairy Tale of My Life" (1855).

Philosophy

Danish philosophy was dominated in the first half of the 19th century by the influence of Hegel and Hegelianism. Johan Ludvig Heiberg (1791–1860), Frederik Christian Sibbern (1785–1872), and especially Hans Lassen Martensen (1803–1884), all of whom contributed to the popularity of Hegel's idealism in various academic disciplines, though Hegel's influence significantly declined by 1850. The primary critic of Hegelianism, and the most important philosopher in Denmark at the time, was Søren Kierkegaard (1813–1855), an existentialist philosopher and a theologian. Much of Kierkegaard's philosophical work deals with the issues of how one lives, focusing on the priority of concrete human reality over abstract thinking and highlighting the importance of personal choice and commitment. His principal aesthetic works include Either/Or (Enten-Eller) (1843), Philosophical Fragments (Philosophiske Smuler) (1844), Stages on Life's Way (Stadier paa Livets Vei) (1845) and Concluding Unscientific Postscript to Philosophical Fragments (Afsluttende uvidenskabelig Efterskrift) (1846). Opposing Hegelian philosophy, they promote the existential approach which raises the individual's awareness of God but intensifies his despair at not being able to achieve eternal truth. His religious works include Works of Love (Kjerlighedens Gjerninger) (1847) and Practice in Christianity (Indøvelse i Christendom) (1850). Another important figure in Danish philosophy was N. F. S. Grundtvig (1784–1872), whose ideas became an important part of the development of Danish national identity.

== Science ==
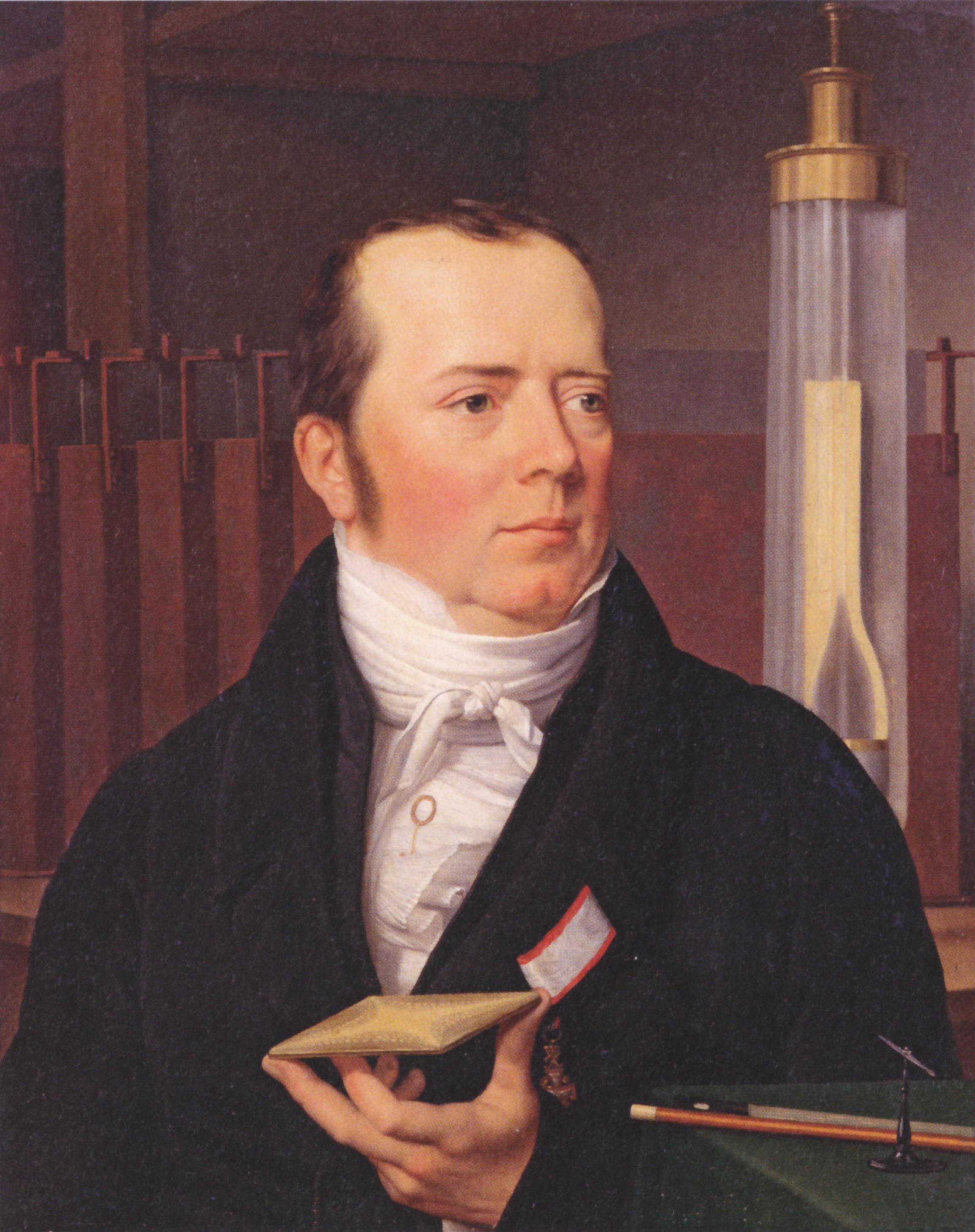
Hans Christian Ørsted

One name stands out above all others among those who contributed to science during the Danish Golden Age, that of Hans Christian Ørsted, the prominent physicist and chemist known for observing that electric currents induce magnetic fields, an important aspect of electromagnetism. He shaped post-Kantian philosophy and advances in science throughout the late 19th century.

In 1824, Ørsted founded Selskabet for Naturlærens Udbredelse (SNU), a society to disseminate knowledge of the natural sciences. He was also the founder of predecessor organizations which eventually became the Danish Meteorological Institute and the Danish Patent and Trademark Office. Ørsted was the first modern thinker to explicitly describe and name the thought experiment. He was convinced that all things in the universe were related, both materially and spiritually. He described this in his philosophical work Ånden i naturen (The Spirit in Nature).

Ørsted contributed strongly to the Golden Age, especially through his close friendship with Hans Christian Andersen.

== Impact ==
The leading players in the Danish Golden Age have not only had a lasting impact in Denmark, but throughout the world. Hans Christian Andersen's fairy tales have been translated into over 150 languages, more than any book apart from the Bible, and continue to be read to children everywhere. With the exception of Norwegian-born Ludvig Holberg, no Danish writer before 1870 exercised so wide an influence as Adam Gottlob Oehlenschläger. His work was to awaken his compatriots' enthusiasm for the poetry and religion of their ancestors, to the extent that his name remains to this day synonymous with Scandinavian romance.

In architecture, when designing the Thorvaldsen Museum, Michael Bindesbøll gave special attention to liberating the building from its surroundings. His free perception of space served as a guiding principle for the cities and buildings of the future.

The choreographer, August Bournonville, resisting many of the excesses of the romantic era ballets, gave equal emphasis to male and female roles in his work at a time when European ballet emphasized the ballerina.

N. F. S. Grundtvig exerted considerable influence on education, promoting a spirit of freedom, poetry and disciplined creativity. Opposing compulsion and examinations, he advocated unleashing human creativity according to the universally creative order of life. A spirit of freedom, cooperation and discovery was to be kindled in individuals, in science, and in society as a whole. Søren Kierkegaard has also strongly influenced philosophy and literature right up to the present day. Among the many who have profited from his ideas are Jean-Paul Sartre, Niels Bohr and W. H. Auden.

Hans Christian Ørsted's scientific advances contributed fundamentally to chemistry, with his work on aluminium, and especially to physics, with his conclusive research on electromagnetism.

Finally, many of the works of the painters and sculptors of the period continue to be exhibited in the world's finest museums and galleries. Some, like Christen Købke, have attracted renewed interest in recent years.
