= Albert Kuchler =

Albert Kuchler may refer to:

- Albert Küchler, Danish painter
- Albert Kuchler (skier), German cross-country skier
