= Jørgen Roed =

Danish painter (1808–1888)

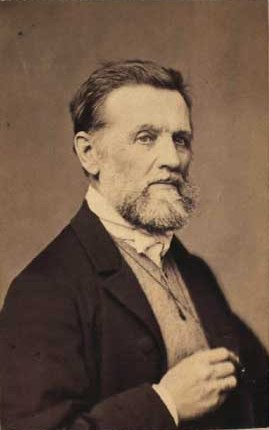
- Jørgen Roed photographed by Budtz Müller
- Born: 3 January 1808; Ringsted, Denmark-Norway
- Died: 8 August 1888 (aged 80); Copenhagen, Denmark
- Education: Royal Danish Academy of Fine Arts
- Known for: Painting
- Movement: Danish Golden Age

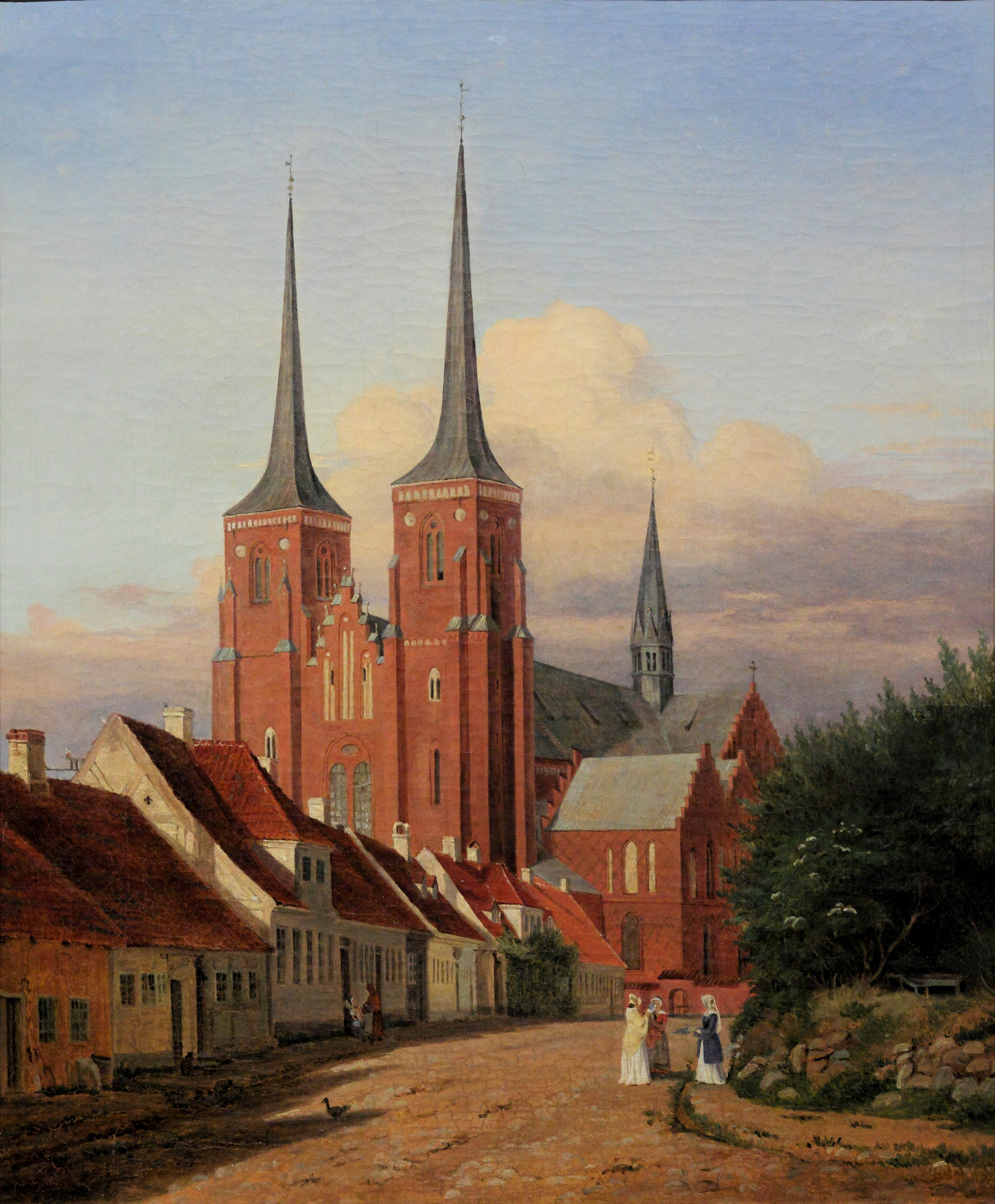
Jørgen Roed, Roskilde Cathedral, 1833–1838, ARoS Aarhus Kunstmuseum.

Jørgen Roed (13 January 1808 – 8 August 1888), Danish portrait and genre painter associated with the Golden Age of Danish Painting, was born in Ringsted to Peder Jørgensen Roed and wife, Ellen Hansdatter.

== Biography ==
=== Growing up ===
His father, a German immigrant, was a member of the town council, owned a farm where they raised animals and ran a distillery. He was one of five children. They were neighbors to the Vermehren family, whose son Frederik Vermehren would also become an artist and student of Roed.

Already while in school he had the opportunity to learn to draw and paint under schoolteacher J. J. Fyhn. Although the quality of that education was not particularly impressive, Roed's enthusiasm was enough to inspire his parents to send him to Copenhagen in 1822 after his confirmation to train at the Royal Danish Academy of Art (Det Kongelige Danske Kunstakademi).

=== Training at the Academy ===
He was recommended to train under portraitist Hans Hansen, father of Constantin Hansen, where he studied privately, and began to paint. The most lasting result of his education under Hansen was the friendship Roed developed with Constantine, the teacher's son. Roed's training under Hansen was limited to making copies of other artworks, such as his first exhibited painting in 1824, an angel's head painted after another copy based on a work by Raphael. It was first in 1826 that he exhibited an independent piece, a portrait of his first art teacher.

He had also started his training at the Academy at the same time, first in the free hand drawing school in 1822, and then in 1825 in the School of Plaster Cast Painting. He exhibited at Charlottenborg Spring Exhibition for the first time in 1824, and continued showing there regularly throughout his life.

Hansen died in 1828, and both Roed and the younger Hansen came into training under Christoffer Wilhelm Eckersberg, father of the "Golden Age of Danish Painting". Roed and Hansen were friends, and socialized much. Hansen was often a guest in the Roed's home, and they traveled together in Denmark painting side-by-side.

His academic years went slowly but evenly; he was a solid student, and a solid painter. Eckersberg had a strong influence on his artistic development. Roed became a lifelong and loyal admirer of Eckersberg, and his principles of exact and careful observations of nature.

He developed his own style within genre painting, and became proficient in portrait painting. He first won the Academy's little silver medallion along with a cash prize in 1831, and then the large silver medallion in 1833. He did not compete for the gold medallion.

He traveled to Norway in 1831.

He showed his talent as an architecture painter early on, and twice won competitions in this discipline at the Art Union (Kunstforening). He won the competition, themed "A public place or building" in 1836 with his painting "Parti af Frederiksborg. Karusselporten" ("View of Frederiksborg Castle, The Karrusel Gate"). Niels Lauritz Høyen, who selected the theme of the competition, was a critic, art historian, leader of the Art Union and teacher at the Academy at the time. In this way he was able to infect many young artists with his interest in nationalism, and to influence their artistic development. The painting is now in the collection of the Horsens Art Museum.

He painted a number of architectural paintings during the mid-1830s including a pair featuring Roskilde Cathedral. His painting "En gade i Roskilde. I baggrunden domkirken" ("A Street in Roskilde, in the Background the Cathedral") painted in 1835–1836 is in the collection of the National Gallery of Denmark. He features the cathedral in an atmospheric streetscape, which combines his architectural perspective with a sense of its surroundings and the people that live there.

=== Foreign study ===
Starting in 1835 he began seeking a travel stipend from the Academy, but he had stiff competition from both Wilhelm Marstrand and Louis Gurlitt, fellow students who would be prioritised higher than him for these limited funds. He, therefore, first received a two-year travel stipend in 1837, which was later renewed for a second two-year term. This allowed him to live in Italy from 1837 to 1841.

Before leaving on his travels he became engaged to Emilie Mathilde Kruse, who waited for his return to marry.

He traveled first to Düsseldorf, and then to Italy where he stayed primarily in Rome. He also traveled to Naples in the company of Constantin Hansen and Wilhelm Marstrand. During his Italian stay he strengthened his skills painting landscapes and especially architecture. He made several paintings that come close to being architecture paintings, as well as several altarpieces for country churches. He also painted a copy based on a large painting by Raphael. A major work from this period was "Fængselsgården i Palazzo del Bargello" ("Prison Yard at the Palazzo del Bargello"), where Roed combined his fine sense of architecture with a lively group of local people into a scene fit for a genre painting.

=== Artistic and academic career in Denmark ===
He returned to Denmark in 1842, where these paintings were well received. Roed concentrated his efforts on establishing a career at the Academy.

He married his fiancée on 22 May 1842. They had two children, son Holger Roed, who would become an artist like his father, and daughter Helena (Helena Nyblom, née Roed), a Swedish-Danish writer who would marry Carl Rupert Nyblom, art historian and member of the Swedish Academy. The couple became part of a circle of artists and artists' friends, including the younger Julius Lange, upon whom Roed had a great influence.

In the summer of 1843 he was invited to become a member of the Academy based on a portrait he made of Johan Christian Drewsen. He submitted a portrait of sculptor H. V. Bissen for his admission piece, and was accepted into the Academy as a portraitist in 1844. These monumentally conceived paintings set the standard for his many solidly produced portraits in the years to come.

He traveled to Dresden in September 1850, and again from April–November 1851.

He traveled from November 1861 to March 1862, first to London for the World's Exhibition where his work was on display, and then to Paris, Florence and Rome. After his return to Denmark he was named professor at the Academy's School of Model Painting in 1862. He traveled again to Italy between August and November, 1871 (Pompeii, Capri, Rome), to Berlin July–August 1873 and to Paris August–September 1878 for the World Exhibition.

He continued teaching at the Academy until October 1887, when he took his resignation and received the title of State Councillor (etatsråd).

He died 8 August 1888 at the age of 80 in Copenhagen. He was survived by his wife and daughter.

== Works ==
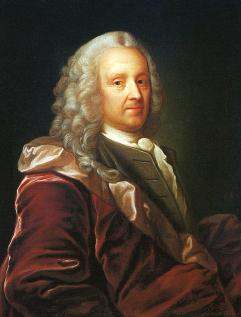
Jørgen Roed's portrait of Ludvig Holberg (1847)

In addition to many portraits he painted a number of altarpieces and religious paintings, including "Jesu Korsfæstelse" ("Crucifixion of Jesus") in 1866 for the restored church at Frederiksborg Palace.

In his later years he sculpted a portrait of his wife in marble.

His training and career began against the backdrop of an exciting time in Danish history, the transition between the authoritative monarchy and the establishment and development of democracy—the period of the Golden Age of Danish Painting as promoted by Eckersberg, and the strong sense of patriotism and nationalism exemplified by Høyen's theories. In Roed's later years there would be great changes in artistic sensibilities. Roed's artistic abilities continued to be solid throughout his lifetime, although the Golden Age ideals he represented were long gone, and replaced by new creative impulses.

His academic efforts can not be underestimated as many young artists were trained under his solid and inspiring leadership during his 25 years as professor.

His paintings are in the collection of many Danish museums including the National Gallery of Denmark, the Hirschsprung Collection, the Ny Carlsberg Glyptotek, Ordrupgaard, and local art museums in Aarhus, Horsens, Ribe and Randers.

His portraits document many important people of his time, including poet Adam Oehlenschläger, bishop and poet Thomas Kingo and artists E.W. Norman, Albert Küchler, Jørgen Sonne, P.C. Skovgaard, and Wilhelm Marstrand. He painted self-portraits in 1829, 1866, and 1883.

== See also ==
- List of Danish painters
- Art of Denmark
