= Carl Edvard Sonne =

Danish printmaker

Carl Edward Sonne
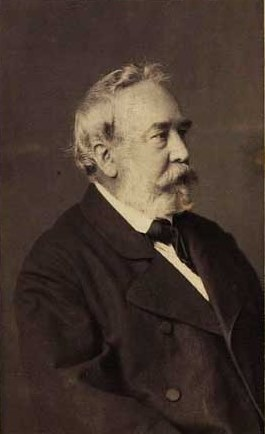
- Sonne photographed by Vurtz Müller
- Born: 1 December 1804; Birkerød, Denmark
- Died: 3 January 1878 (aged 73); Copenhagen, Denmark
- Resting place: Garrison Cemetery, Copenhagen, Copenhagen
- Education: Royal Danish Academy of Art
- Known for: Printmaking

Carl Edvard Sonne (1 December 1804 – 3 January 1878) was a Danish printmaker. His work consisted exclusively of reproductions of works by other artists, especially genre paintings, which reached a large audience through Kunstforeningen. He was the brother of painter Jørgen Sonne.

== Life ==
=== Early life and education ===
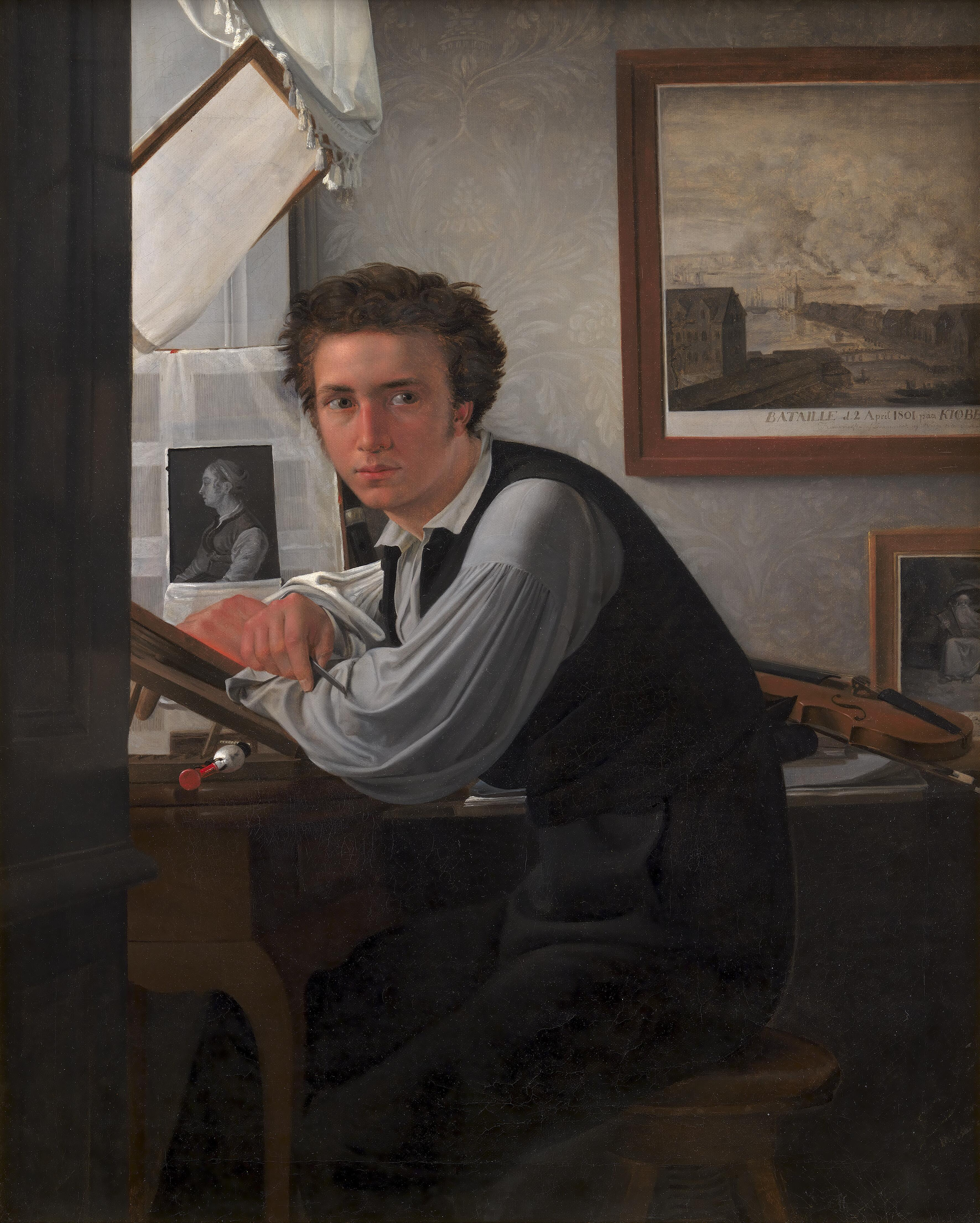
Ditlev Blunck: The printmaker C. E. Sonne, 1826

Sonne was born on 1 December 1804 in Birkerød, the son of printmaker Jeppe Jørgen Sonne (1771–1833) and Else Cathrine Zimmer (1771–1851). He trained as a printmaker under his father and at the Royal Danish Academy of Fine Arts in 1819–28. He was also trained in drawing privately under J. L. Lund.

In 1826 and 1828 he published 18 reproductions of works by mostly contemporary artists such as Herman Wilhelm Bissen, Ditlev Blunck, Albert Küchler, Martinus Rørbye and others.

=== Italy, 1828–1847 ===
In 1828, prompted by J. F. Clemens' high age and poor health, Sonne travelled to Parma to continue his training under Paolo Toschi. He ended up spending the next 20 years in Italy, working at leading graphic workshops in both Parma and Turin.

=== Career in Denmark ===
On his return to Copenhagen in 1847, Sonne was made an associated member of the art academy but was not accepted as a real member until 1858. He exhibited his works at Charlottenborg in 1826–76.

He died unmarried on 3 January 1878 in Copenhagen and is buried in the city's Garrison Cemetery.

== Works ==
39 of Sonne's works are included in the Royal Danish Print Collection.

== Depictions ==
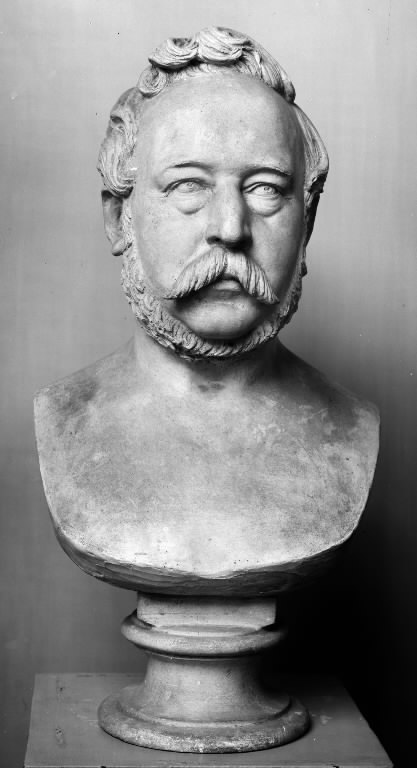
Bust of Sonne by H. W. Bissen, 1860

Sonne is portrayed in a genre painting by Ditlev Blunck from 1826. He is seen in a boat on his brother Jørgen Sonne's monumental frieze of Bertel Thorvaldsen's homecoming on the façade of Thorvaldsens Museum in spite of the fact that he still lived in Italy when Thorvaldsen returned to Copenhagen in 1843. The sculptor Herman Wilhelm Bissen created a portrait bust of him in 1960 (Danish National Gallery.
