= Helena Nyblom =

Danish-Swedish author

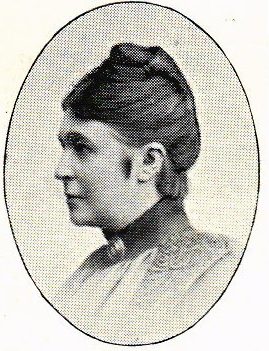
Helene Nyblom

Helena Nyblom (7 December 1843 – 9 October 1926) was a Danish-Swedish author. She is perhaps most remembered for The Swan Suit. She died in Stockholm.

== Biography ==
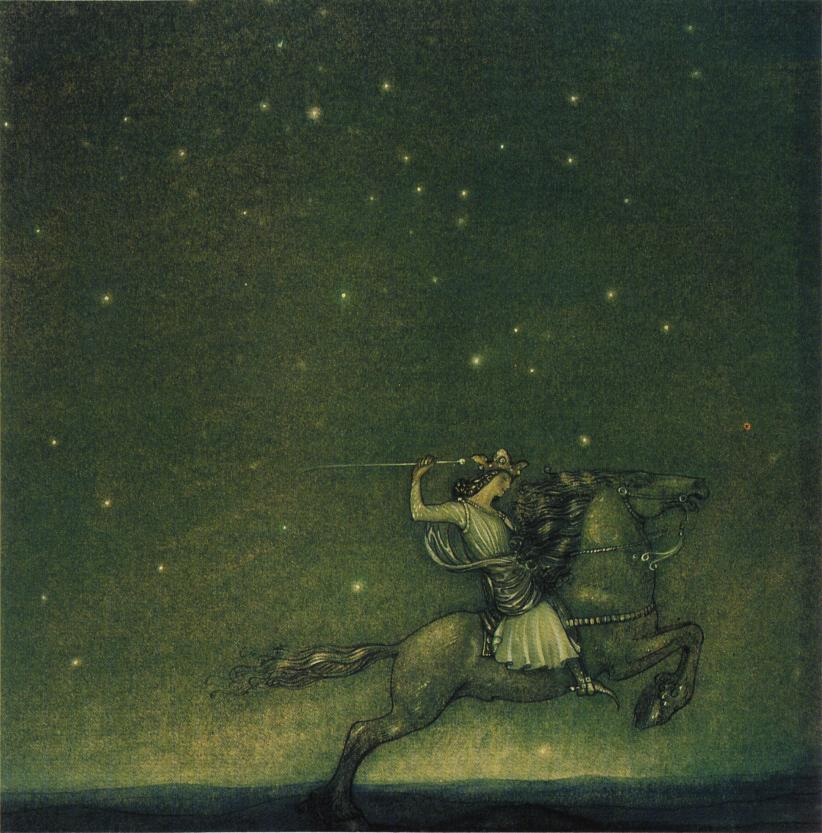
Illustration, by John Bauer, to Helena Nyblom's fairy tale "The Ring".

Helena was born in Copenhagen, Denmark, daughter to the Danish painter Jørgen Roed. Her brother was the painter Holger Roed. In September 1864 she married the Swedish academic Carl Rupert Nyblom, Associate Professor of Aesthetics at Uppsala University, and at the end of the month the newly-weds took a steamer to Uppsala.

Helena's first writings were poems and short stories. The stories, written in Danish and then translated into Swedish by her husband, were first published in the Ny Illustrerad Tidskrift (New Illustrated Journal) and subsequently collected in four volumes between 1875 and 1881. Helena did not think highly of the stories, which she regarded as potboilers. (The Nybloms had six children and needed the money.) Innately musical, she put more of herself into her poems, many of which were later set to music by Emil Sjögren and other composers. Her first collection of poems, written in Danish, came out in 1881. It attracted attention not just in Denmark, but also in Sweden, where it was praised by the poet Carl Snoilsky.

She published her first fairy tales in 1897, when she was 54 years old. In all she wrote more than 80 fairy tales, in which she mixed Swedish folklore, ancient myths and romantic motifs. Many of her tales contain clear feminist messages. Besides publishing her own collections, she also contributed to the Swedish folklore and fairy tales annual Among Gnomes and Trolls, where many of her tales were illustrated by John Bauer.

In 1895, Helena converted to Roman Catholicism in St. Eugenia's Church (Stockholm). The conversion received great attention in the media and she endured much criticism in her circle of friends to have fallen for Rome. Her husband, himself not a Catholic, publicly defended her conversion. The Catholic minority in Stockholm was proud of the famous convert. (Because Nyblom converted in adulthood her children were educated in Church of Sweden, but a son converted later in life and gave rise to a large Catholic family.)

Nyblom died 9 October 1926, and is buried in Uppsala Old Cemetery.

== Works translated into English ==
- The Little Maid Who Danced to Every Mood and the Knight Who Wanted the Best of Everything (c1910)
- Jolly Calle and Other Swedish Fairy Tales (1912)
- The Witch of the Woods: Fairy Tales from Sweden (1968)
- The Queen's Necklace: A Swedish Folktale (1994)
