= Holger Roed =

Danish painter (1846–1874)

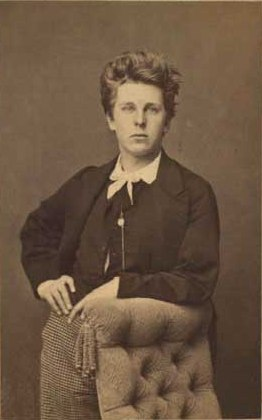

Holger Peter Roed (2 November 1846 – 20 February 1874) was a Danish painter.

== Biography ==
Roed was born on 2 November 1846, in Copenhagen to painter Jørgen Roed and wife Emilie Mathilde. He had a promising artistic career ahead of him when he died at the age of 27.

He was one of two children, along with Helena, in the lively and cultured artistic Roed household.

He started his training at the Royal Danish Academy of Art (Det Kongelige Danske Kunstakademi) in 1861, won the small silver medallion in 1864, and graduated in 1866. He received the small gold medallion in 1868 for "Den fortabte Søn" ("The Prodigal Son") and the large gold medallion in 1870 for "Optrin af Syndfloden" ("A Scene from the Great Deluge"), both of which are in the collection of the Academy.

He received a travel grant from the Academy which allowed him to travel 1870–1872 to Italy (Rome and Naples). Towards the end of his tour in Italy he became sick and returned home. He tried to bolster his health with a stay in the countryside, but died on 20 February 1874, aged 27, at Iselingen estate near Vordingborg from an abdominal inflammation.

In addition to schoolwork he managed to exhibit "Udsigt fra Knippelsbro" ("A View from Knippelsbro Bridge") and "Portræt af en ung Musiker" ("Portrait of a Young Musician") during his short life. An unfinished painting, "Et Jagtparti" ("A Hunting Scene"), was completed by his father.

== See also ==
- List of Danish painters
