= Jørgen Sonne (painter) =

Danish painter (1801–1890)

Jørgen Valentin Sonne
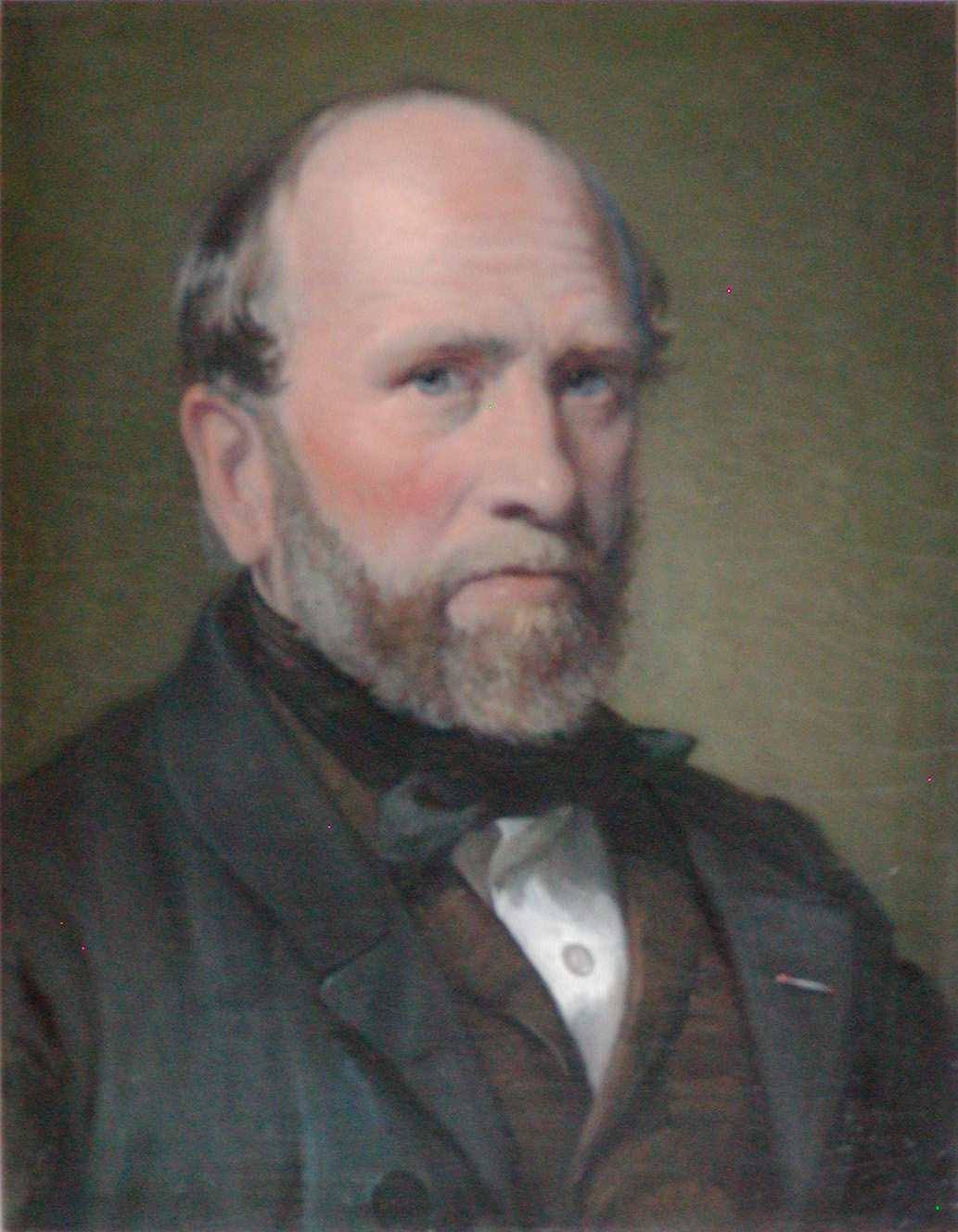
- Portrait by Wilhelm Marstrand (1853)
- Born: 24 June 1801; Birkerød, Denmark
- Died: 24 September 1890 (aged 89); Copenhagen, Denmark
- Resting place: Holmens Kirkegård
- Education: Royal Danish Academy of Fine Arts; Academy of Fine Arts, Munich
- Style: Genre art

Jørgen Valentin Sonne (24 June 1801 – 24 September 1890) was a Danish genre painter; known primarily for his battle scenes.

== Biography ==
Jørgen Sonne was born at Birkerød. His father, Jeppe (1771–1833), was a copperplate engraver for the Royal Mint. His brother Carl Edvard Sonne (1804–1878) was a printmaker.

Sonne originally intended to pursue a military career and enrolled at the Royal Danish Military Academy, but left after a year and attended the Royal Danish Academy of Fine Arts instead. At the same time, he began to work in the studios of Christian David Gebauer, mostly making copies of the old Dutch Masters. He also painted some original pictures and had a small showing in 1818.

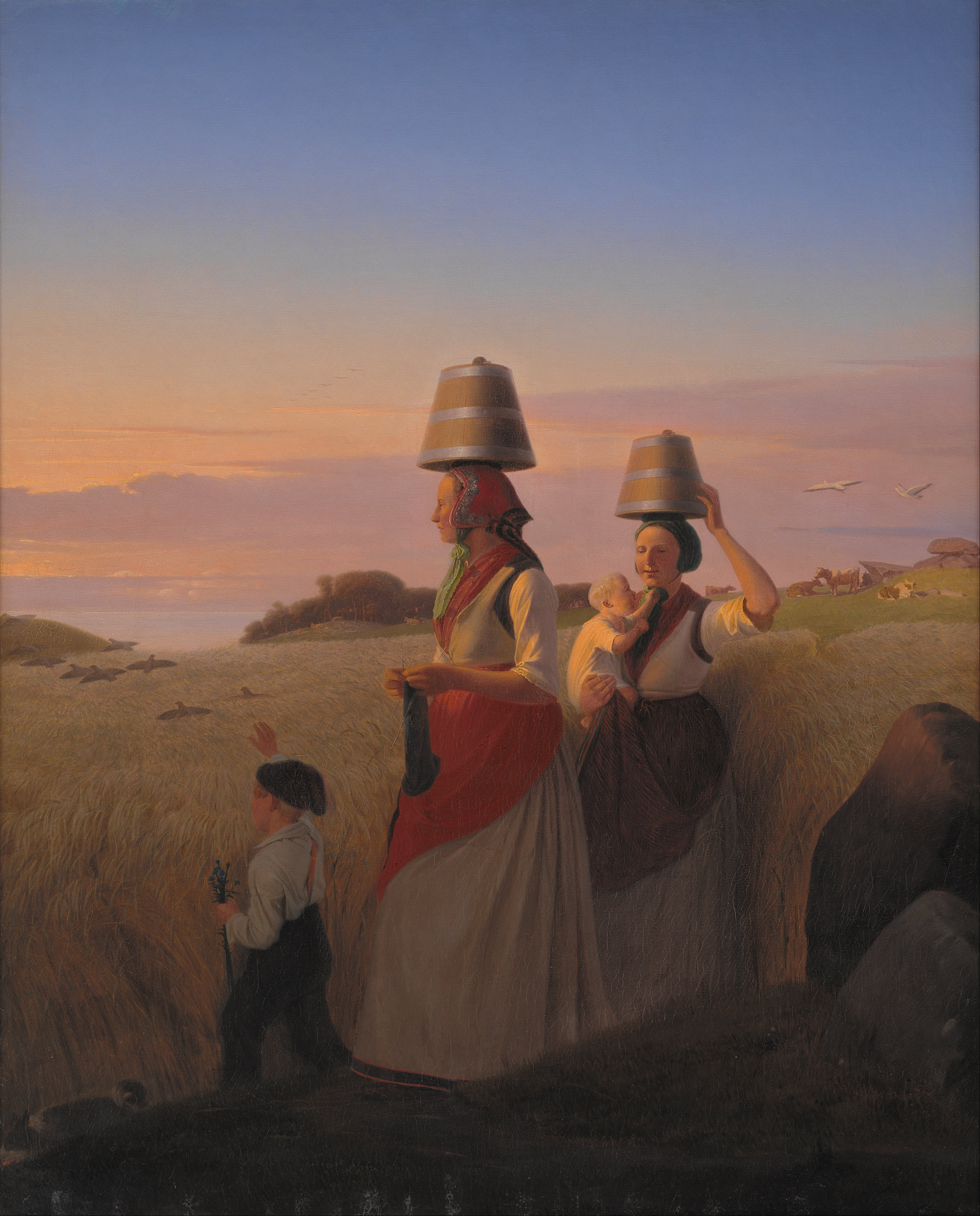
Rural Scene (1848)

In 1828, he received a travel stipend from the Academy that allowed him to visit Munich, where he became an apprentice of the history painter, Peter von Cornelius. He stayed there for three years and made several trips into the mountains to do landscapes, which are not among his best works.

When he left Munich, he was able to obtain further support for studies in Rome. While there, he made numerous hunting trips as an excuse to observe the rural peasants and their daily habits. During these trips he made sketches that he would use as inspiration throughout his career.

He returned to Denmark in 1841; producing works based on his Italian studies as well as ones depicting the Danish peasantry. In 1848, following the start of the First Schleswig War, he was given permission to accompany the army to Southern Jutland. Many of the soldiers were impressed by the way he calmly sketched while bullets flew around him. During the Second Schleswig War, despite being sixty-three years old, he was with the army again, at the Battle of Dybbøl and in Sønderborg when the city was under bombardment.

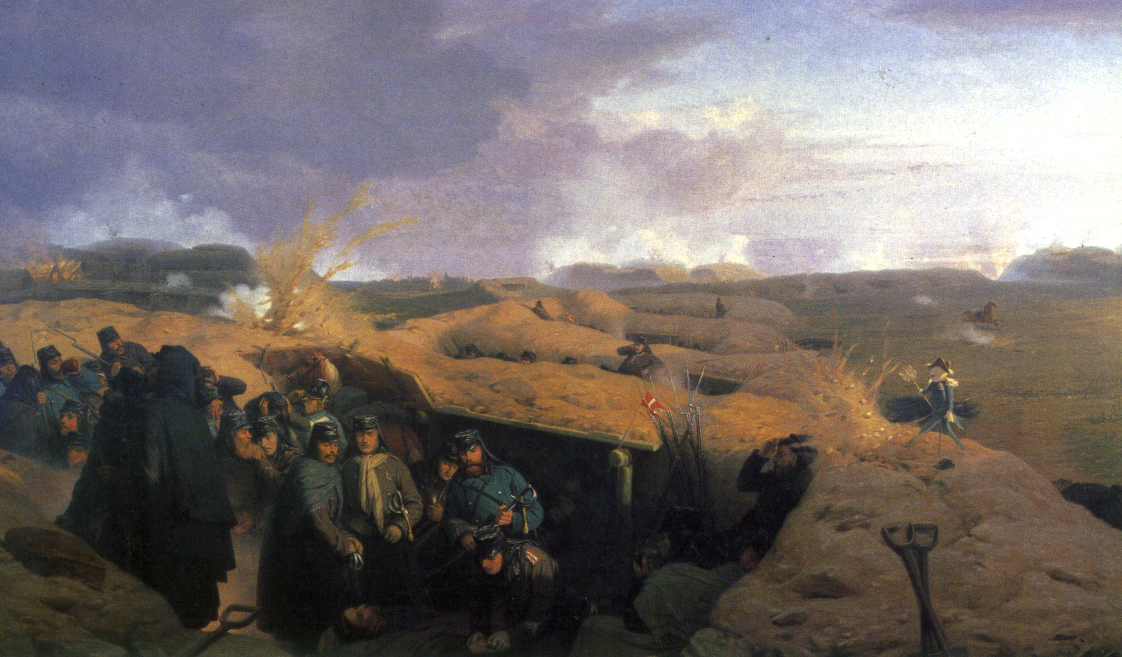
Scene from the Battle of Dybbøl (1871)

In 1865, he was awarded the Anckerske Legat (a scholarship for writers, artists and composers) and was able to return to Italy for a year. In addition to his canvases, he is known for designing a large mural on the exterior walls of the Thorvaldsen Museum and illustrations for a Danish translation of the Hindu play, Shakuntala. He was appointed a Knight of the Order of the Dannebrog in 1852, and received the Dannebrogordenens Hæderstegn in 1881.

During his last decade, he began having eye problems and became too weak to paint for long periods. To the end, his artistic outlook was conservative; believing that the latest trends were simply a way to hide lack of content. He never married.
