= Albert Küchler =

Danish painter (1803–1886)

Albert Küchler, O.F.M.
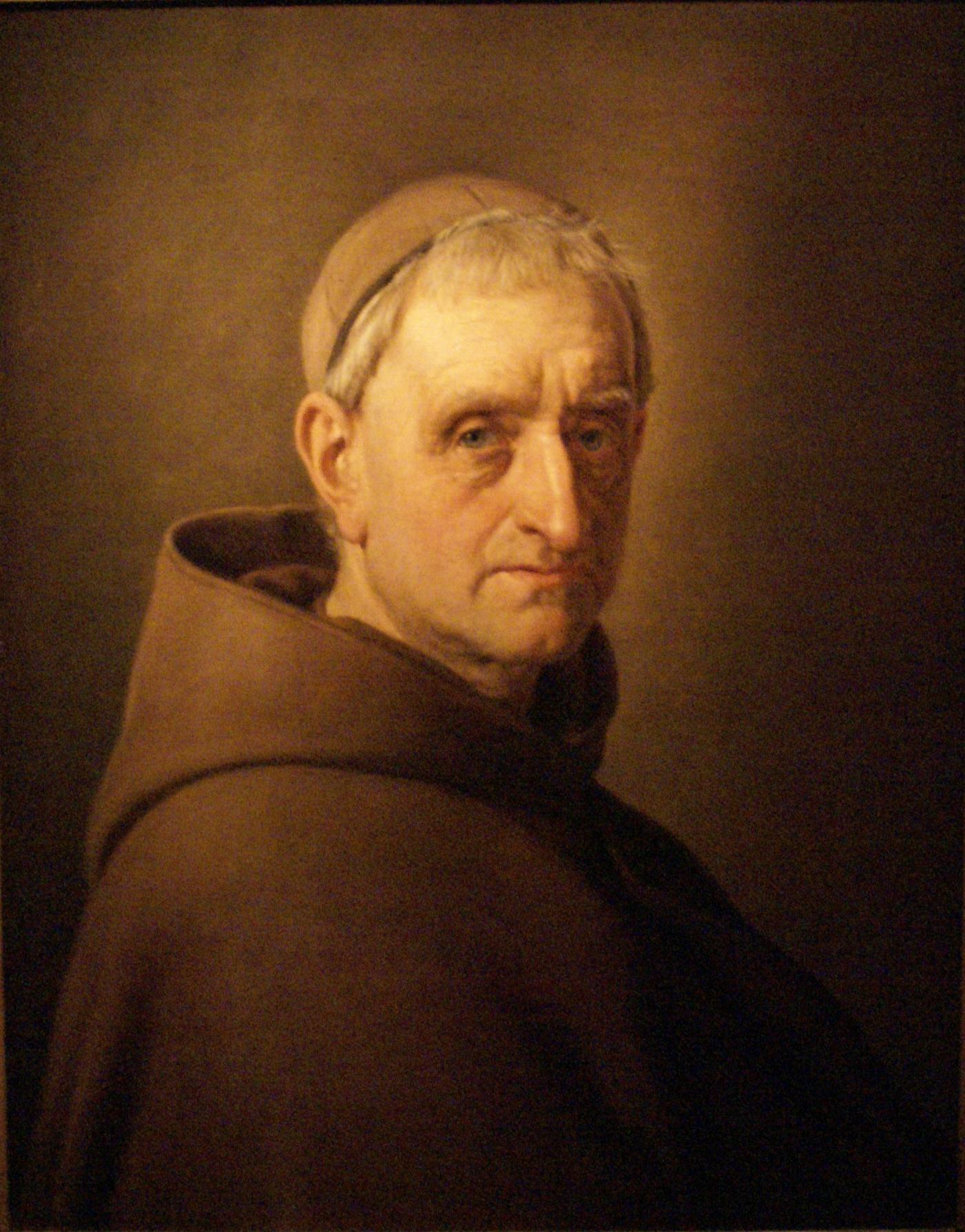
- Albert Küchler painted by Jørgen Roed in 1882
- Born: 2 May 1803; Copenhagen, Denmark-Norway
- Died: 16 February 1886 (aged 82); Rome, Kingdom of Italy
- Education: Royal Danish Academy of Fine Arts
- Known for: Painting
- Movement: Danish Golden Age, Neoclassicism

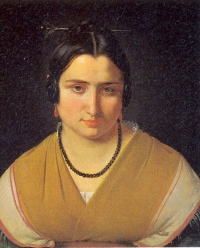
The Albanian (1831)

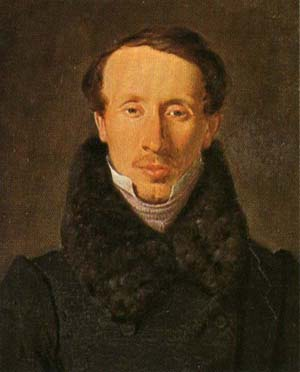
Hans Christian Andersen (1834)

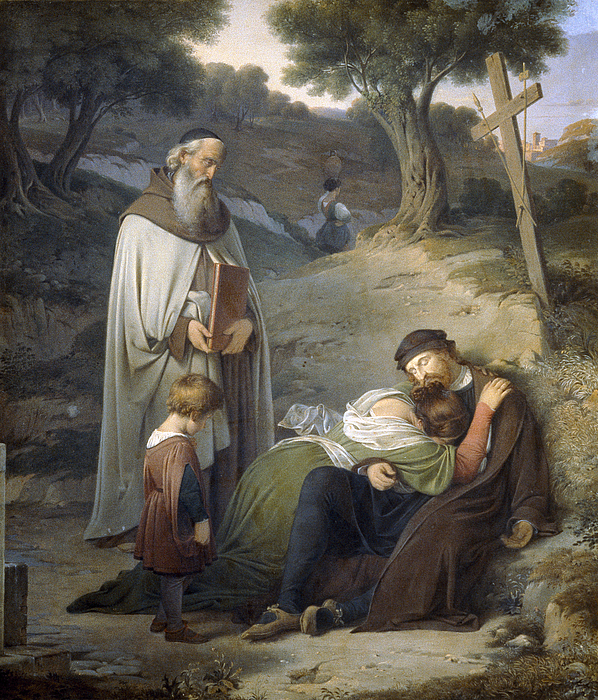
Correggio's Death (1834)

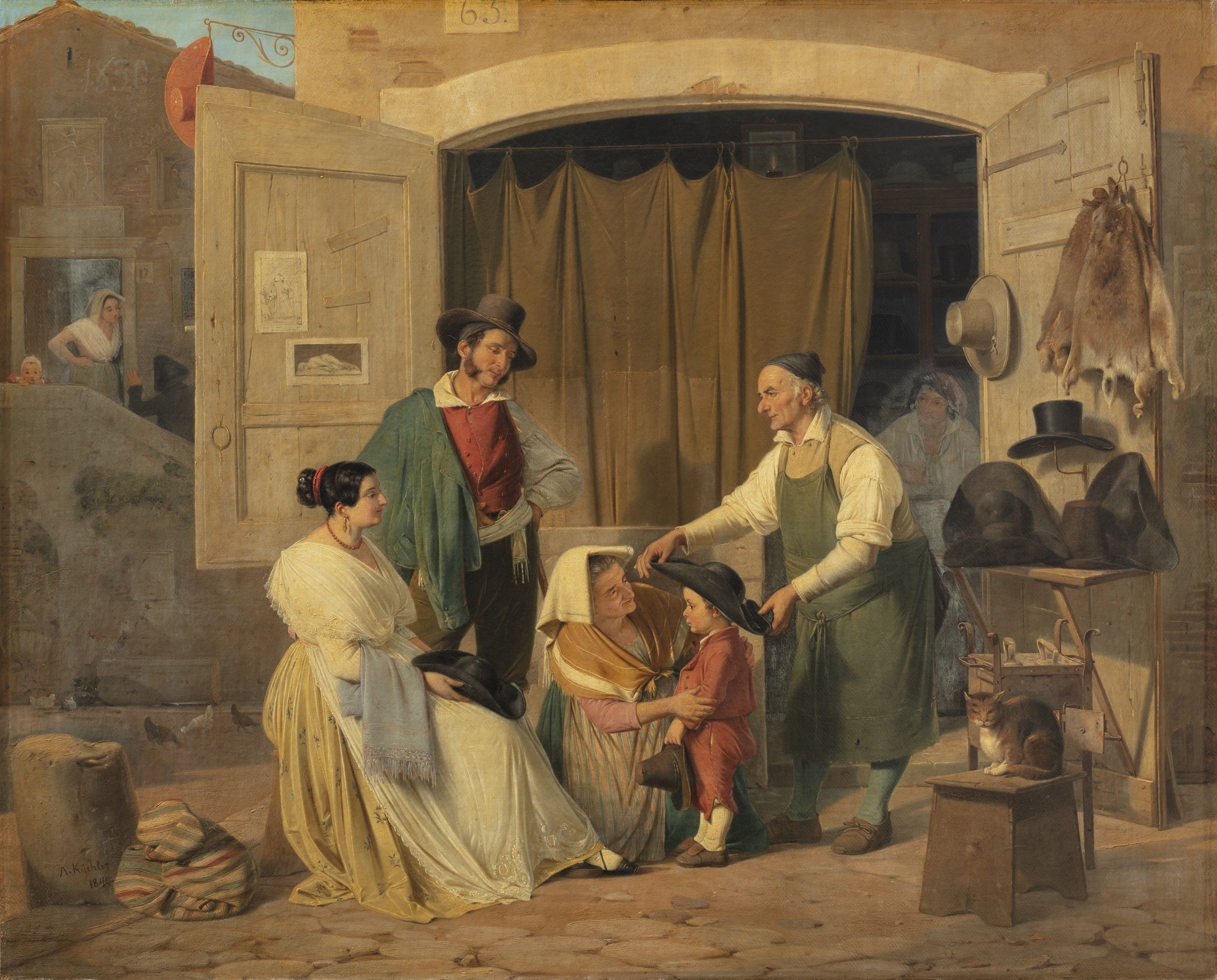
A Roman Couple Buy a Hat for Their Little Son who is to Become an Abbate (1840)

Albert Küchler, O.F.M. (Danish pronunciation: [ˈælˀpɛɐ̯d ˈkʰyɡ̊lɐ]; 2 May 1803 – 16 February 1886), also known as Peter of Copenhagen, was a Danish painter associated with the Danish Golden Age. He mainly painted genre works and portraits. He was highly esteemed by his contemporaries but is little known today. Later in life, he converted to Catholicism and became a member of the Order of Friars Minor

== Early life and education ==
Küchler was born in Copenhagen to cabinet maker Christian Küchler (c. 1772–1845) and his wife Mette Cathrine Andreasdatter Terkelsen (ca. 1762–1849). His father disapproved of his ambitions to become an artist but ultimately accepted and Albert attended the Royal Danish Academy of Fine Arts from 1816. Like the rest of his generation of Danish painters, he studied under Christoffer Wilhelm Eckersberg (1783-1853). The German Nazarene movement and its artistic programme were also important to Küchler. He won the great gold medal at the Academy in 1829.

== Time in Rome with the Danish artists colony ==
With the Gold Medal came a travel scholarship and in 1830 Küchler travelled to Rome where he settled and became a popular member of the city's thriving community of Danish artists. He is seen in several of the most well-known paintings of the period, including A gathering of Danish artists in Rome (1837) by Constantin Hansen (1804– 1880) and Danish artists in a Roman osteria (1837) by Ditlev Blunck (1798–1853). Küchler mainly painted the colourful everyday life of the locals.

He was a particularly close friend of the poet Christian Winther (1796–1876) for whom he painted The Albanian Girl (1831), also known as The Italian Girl, a painting of Winther's local girlfriend . He also painted a portrait of Hans Christian Andersen during Andersen's first visit to Rome from 1833 to 1834.

== Conversion to Catholicism ==
Küchler converted to Roman Catholicism in 1844. His friends were critical and surprised at his new religious attitude. In 1851, he took his religious beliefs even further when he became a Friar Minor, assuming the religious name of Peter of Copenhagen. He spent three years in the St. Joseph Church in Prudnik before settling in the St. Bonaventure Monastery on Rome's Palatine Hill, where he spent the remainder of his life.

== Religious paintings ==
The Pope gave him special permission to continue his artistic work in the monastery and gave him several assignments. From that time on, he made exclusively religious works, including altarpieces and copies of older paintings.

In Denmark, his religious works can be seen in churches at Ballerup and Esbønderup in northern Zealand and Toreby Church on Lolland. It has been observed that Küchler's early works, from the time prior to his conversion, are also rich in religious references. An example is Correggio's Death from 1834. The immediate inspiration for the painting was the tragedy Correggio (1809) by playwright Adam Oehlenschläger (1779–1850) but in Küchler's interpretation it becomes loaded with religious significance. The composition suggests that Küchler was influenced by Renaissance pictures but the style and technique is representative of the Golden Age.

In Küchler's picture, the scene from the tragedy is transformed into a version of the Passion of Christ through the use of Roman Catholic iconography; the names of the figures are in accordance with this tradition. The analysis leads to the interpretation that Kuchler's intention was to create a work of art loaded with religious significance and not just a scene from the tragedy. The painting A Roman Couple Buy a Hat for Their Little Son who is to Become an Abbate (1840) has also been interpreted in a religious fashion.

== Relationship to Denmark ==
In 1877 he was awarded membership of the Royal Academy in Copenhagen and even a pension from Denmark. On several occasions, Küchler received visitors from Denmark while he lived at the monastery. These included members of the royal family, fellow painters and writers.

== In media and culture ==
- Küchler appears as a character in several novels as well as in a number of poems from the Danish Golden Age.
- The contemporary Chinese artist Liu Ye has made a portrait of Hans Christian Andersen which was based on Küchler's Andersen portrait from 1834.
- In 2004-06 Küchler's painting of Christian Winther's girlfriend was the object of debate in Albanian newspapers, magazines and electronic media on her ethnicity. Some believed she was in fact Albanian, possibly from one of the Albanian villages in southern Italy, others that she is from the Alban Hills of Lazio.

== See also ==
- Art of Denmark
- List of Danish painters
