= Amaliegade 45 =

Building in Copenhagen

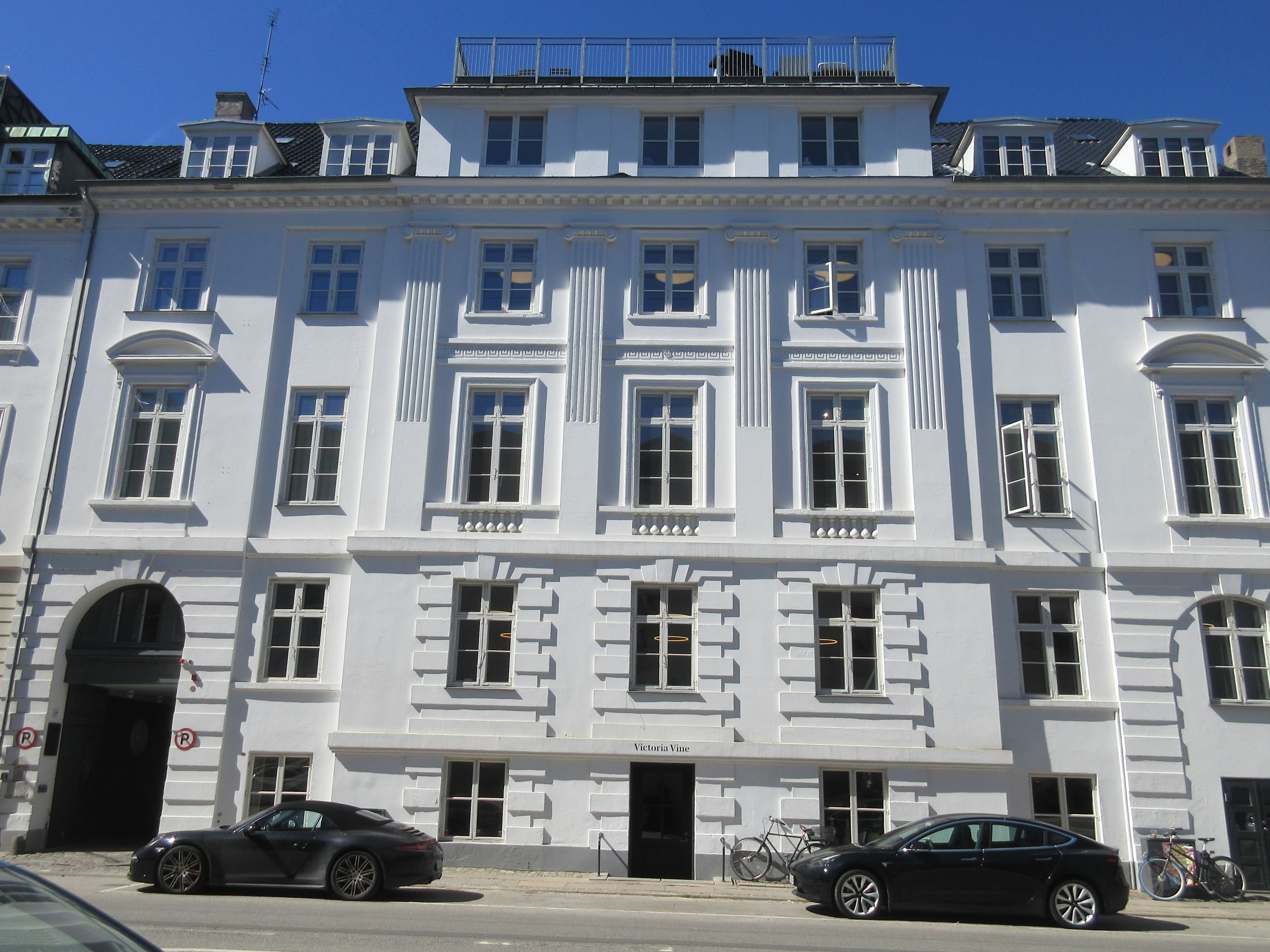
- Amaliegade 56 in April 2026.
- Interactive map of the Amaliegade 45 area

General information
- Architectural style: Andreas Hallander / Jørgen Henrich Rawert
- Location: Copenhagen, Denmark
- Coordinates: 55°41′15.29″N 12°35′45.35″E
- Completed: 1791
- Renovated: 1857
- Client: Hinrich Ladiges

Amaliegade 45 is a Neoclassical property situated at the northern end of Amaliegade in the Frederiksstaden district of central Copenhagen, Denmark. It is part of a row of adjoining buildings constructed at the site by master builder Andreas Hallander in the 1780s but owes its current appearance to an adaptation most likely undertaken by Jørgen Henrich Rawert in 1801. The building was owned by the painter Martin Rørbye's parents from 1817. His first significant painting, View from the Artist's Window, from c. 1825, shows the view from the family's apartment on the second floor. It was listed on the Danish registry of protected buildings and places in 1918.

== History ==
=== Early history ===
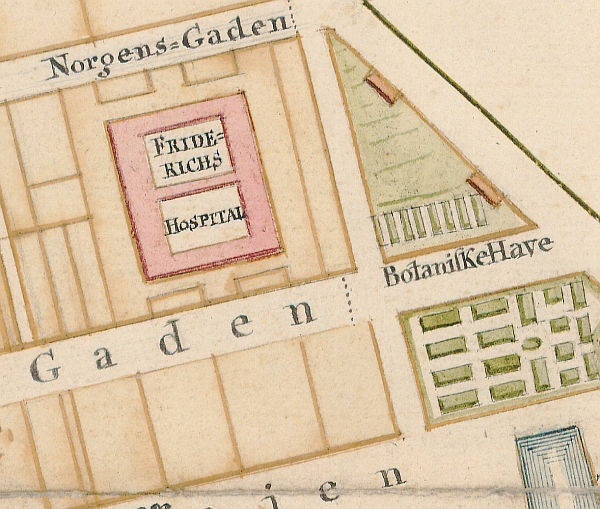
Oeder's Botanical Garden in Amaliegade

Copenhagen's second botanical garden was situated at the site from 1752. It was created by Georg Christian Oeder in the newly founded Frederiksstaden district at the request of Frederik V, at a site bisected by Amaliegade just north of Frederik's Hospital. The smaller western section, covering just under half a hectare, was equipped with a greenhouse while the eastern section remained largely unplanted. The garden was opened to the public in 1763.

The area was reacquired by the king after eight years and the botanical garden was then moved to Gammelholm. In 1781, the site in Amaliegade was donated instead to royal building inspector Caspar Frederik Harsdorff on the condition that he would "built it over with good and permanent buildings within a period of eight years". His plan for the site was a terrace with eight individual houses. He embarked on the construction later the same year but ran into economic difficulties and eventually had to give them up altogether. Andreas Hallander and Johan Martin Quist, two of his former students, saved him from bankruptcy by acquiring the Amaliegade lots. Hallander acquired the northernmost part of the area. He commenced with the building at the corner of Toldbodvej and then worked his way south. Amaliegade 45 (then part of No. 69 G–H) was constructed in 1790–1791.

In 1795, it was acquired by Swedish court secretary Carl Adolf Andersson Boheman. Boheman, who was a personal friend of Andreas Peter Bernstorff, was already the owner of the country house Frydenlund. In the new cadastre of 1806, the property was listed as No. 136. It was still owned by Boheman at the time.

=== Rørbye family ===
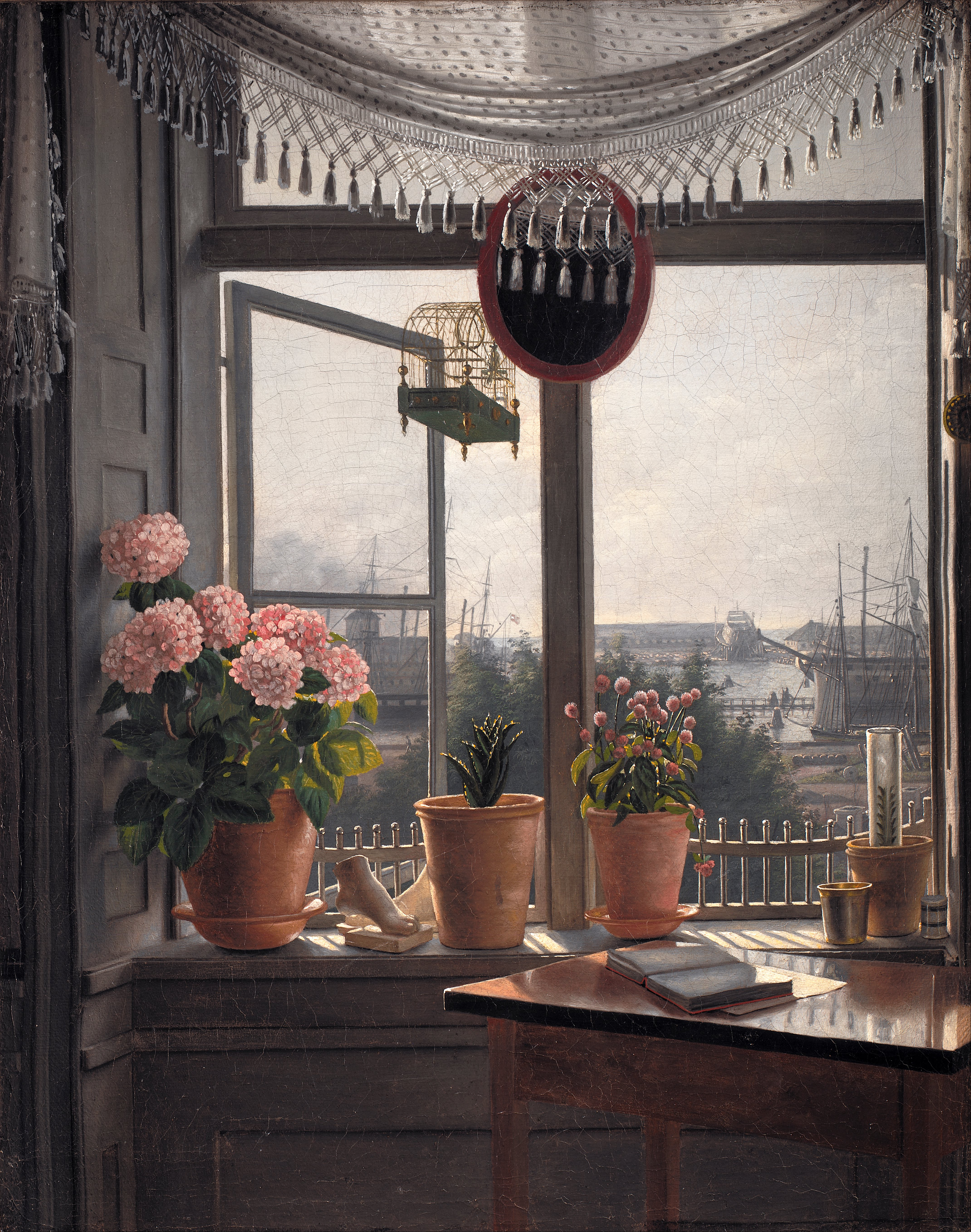
Martinus Rørbye's View from the Artist's Window, c. 1825

In c., 1817, Amaliegade 45 (then Amaliegade 136) was acquired by Ferdinand Henrik Rørbye (1765–1818). He had worked as a materials manager at Kongsberg Silver Mines in Norway. On his return to Denmark in 1814, he had initially owned a property on Vimmelskaftet.

Rørbye's widow Frederikke Eleonora Cathrine Stockfleth (1773–1851) kept the property following her husband's death in 1818. Their son, Martinus Rørbye, enrolled at the Royal Danish Academy of Fine Arts in 1820. In 1825, he painted the view from his window in Amaliegade. He lived in the building until 1831.

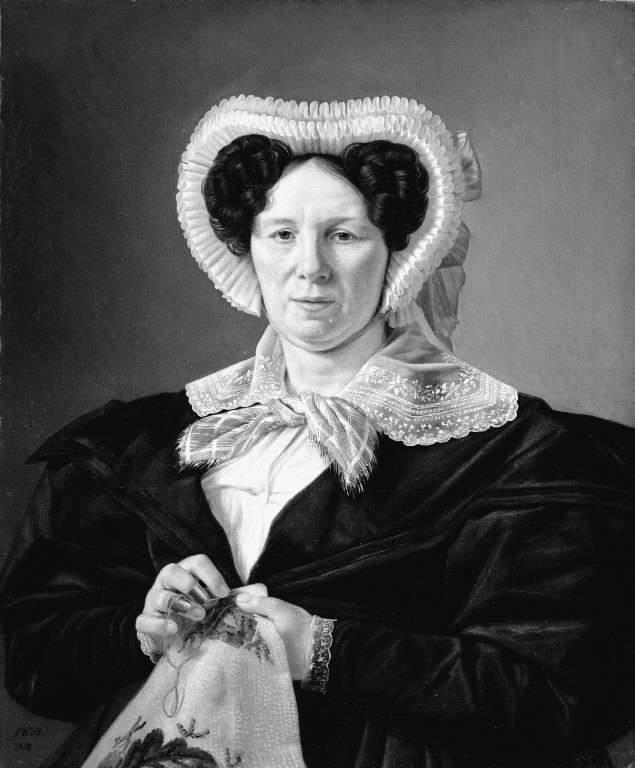
Frederikke Rørbye painted by her son in 1834.

At the time of the 1834 census, Fredrikke Rørbye was still resident in the second floor apartment. She lived there with her artist son, four unmarried daughters, a male servant and a maid. Jens Wolff, the son of London-based Georg Wolff, resided in the first floor apartment with his wife Susan Wolff, their 14-year-old daughter Amalie Susan Marie Wolff, Wolff's cousin Ernst Geo Wolff, a governess, a chambermaid (husjomfru), a male servant and two maids. Barbara Magdalene Meyer (née Herfort), the 78-year-old widow of former director of the Danish West India Company Hans Jørgen Meyer, resided in the second floor apartment with a male servant and two maids. Anders Svenssen, a beer seller (øltapper), resided in the basement with his wife Birgitte Kirstine Kolbert, their six children (aged two to 11), a male servant and a maid. Johan Christian Brun, Rørbye's concierge, resided in the building with his wife Ellen Bruun, their three children (aged seven to 11) and one maid.

By 1840, Rørbye and her daughters had moved to the first floor apartment. Her old apartment on the second floor had been taken over by Henrik Maximillan Schou, a colonel in the Royal Danish Army, who lived there with his wife Ingeborg Elisabeth Schou (née Nielsen), their three children (aged 12 to 16), two male servants and two maids. Countess Juel Wind Friis (1795–1861), widow of Karl Ludvig, Count Krag-Juel-Vind-Frijs of Juellinge (1780–1838), resided in the ground floor apartment with a chambermaid (kammerjomfru), a maid and a servant. Anders Svendsen Luntofte, the proprietor of the tavern in the basement, resided in the associated dwelling with his wife Bergitte Christine Kolberg and their eight children (aged one to 16).

At the time of the 1845 census, No. 137 was home to five households. Frederikke Rørbye was resident in the building with daughter Elise Caroline Rørbye, son John Rørbye, sister Dorothea Julie Stockfleth, three-year-old Julie Frederikke Ipsen, a servant and two maids. Fredrik Adolph Wedelfeldt, a colonel working in the Danish Admiralty, resided in the building with his wife Christina Elisabeth Jørgensen, their four children (aged 10 to 21), a maid and three male servants. Johan Michael Andreas Müller (1805–1881), customs inspector in Copenhagen, resided in another apartment with his wife Charlotte Sophie Thora Meyer (1805–1868), their six children (aged one to 12) and two maids. One of their daughters was the future writer and philanthropist Elfride Fibiger. Petter Jensen, the proprietor of a tavern, resided in the building with his wife Hanne Heriette née Leder, their five children (aged two to 12) and one maid. Ludvig Melchior, a master shoemaker, resided in the building with his wife Anne Marie Melchior née Koch and their five children (aged two to 16).

=== Later history ===
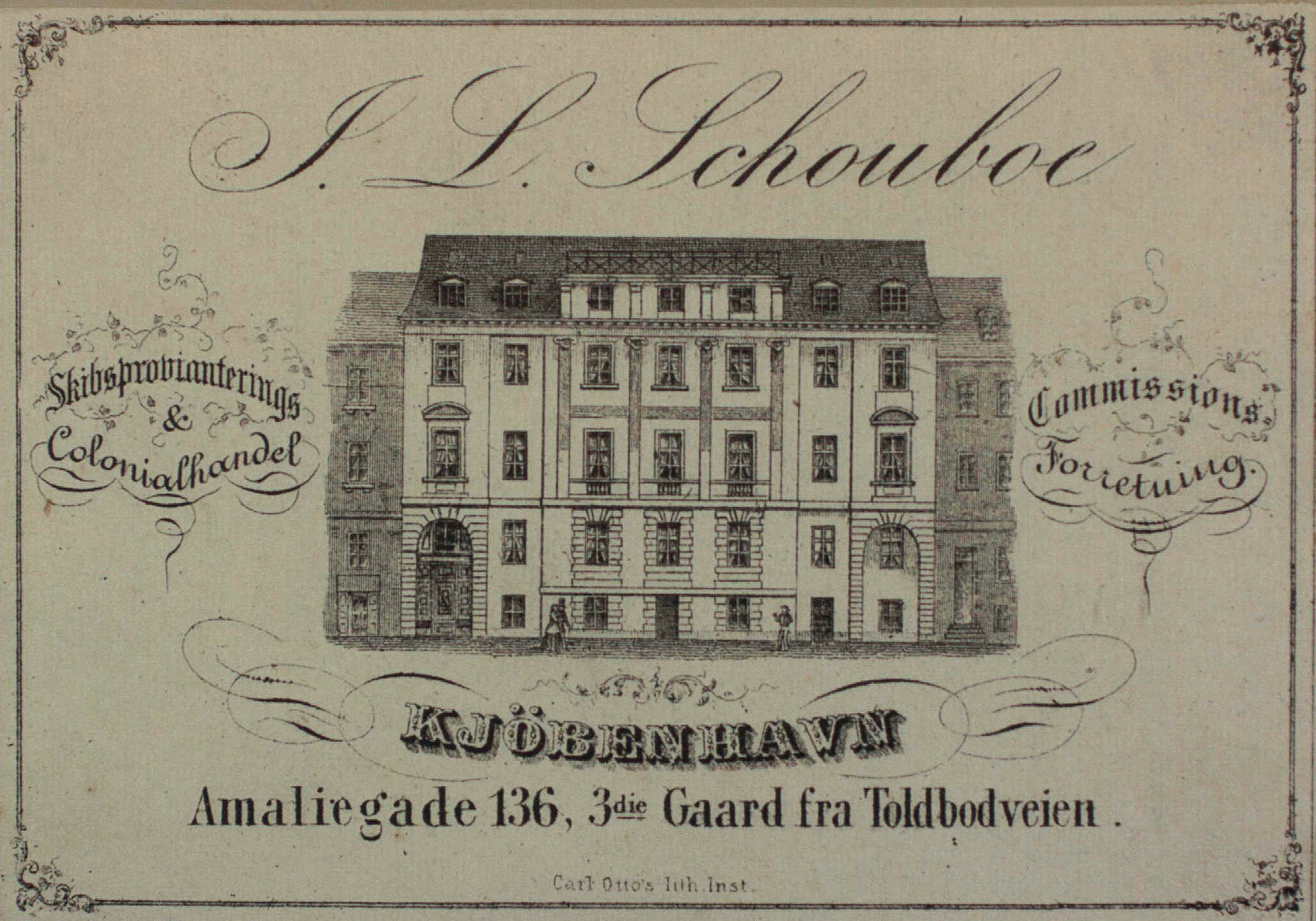
J. l. Schoubue, Amaliegade 135, 3rd yard from Toldbodvejen.

In 1856, Amaliegade (then Amaliegade 136 and from 1859 No. 39) was acquired by Joh. Jac. Leonhard Schouboe. He operated his combined ship chandler business and colonial goods shop in one of the rear wings. He kept the property until 1901.

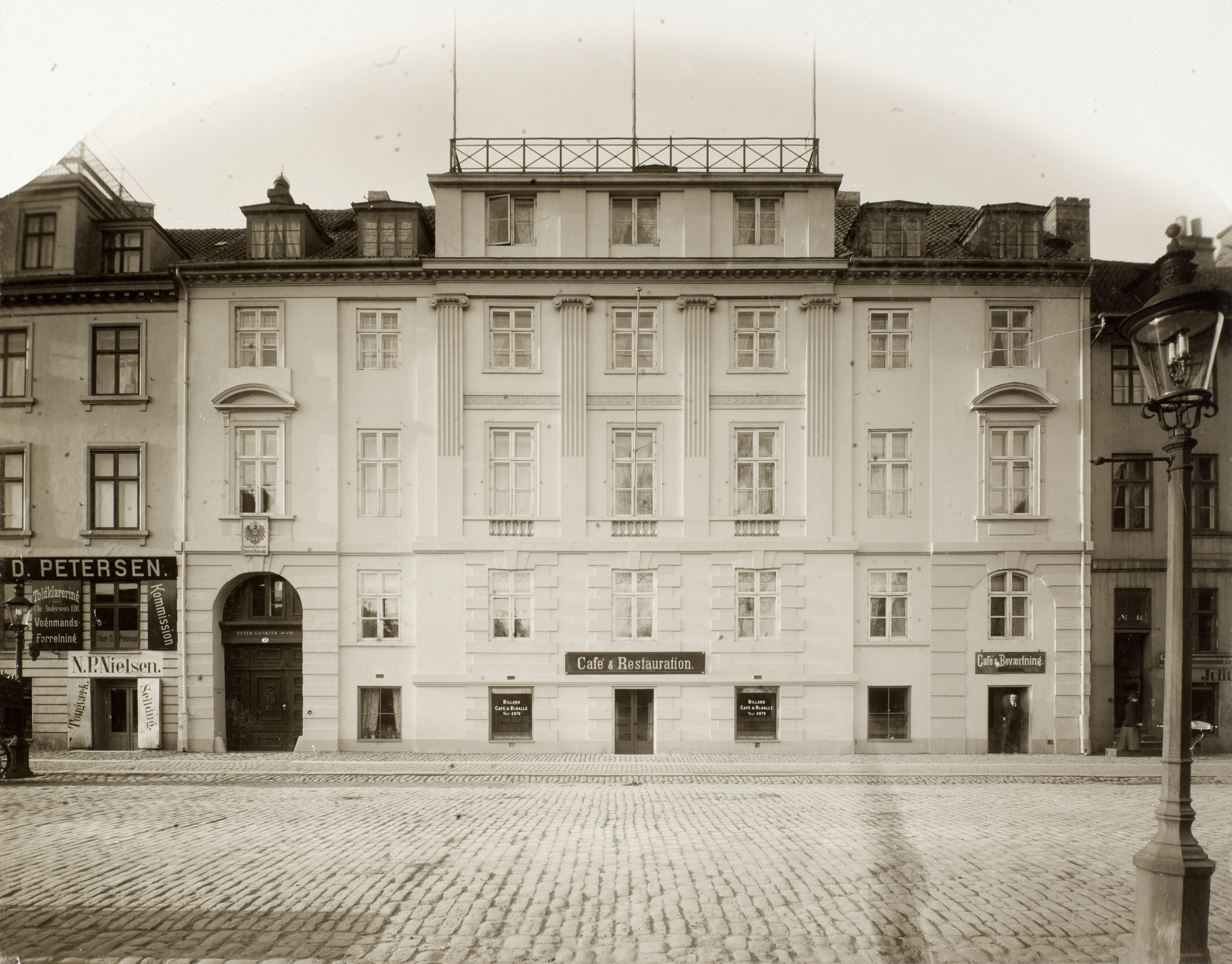
Amaliegade 45 (then No. 39) photographed by Johannes Hauerslev .

In 1902, Schouboe's heirs sold the property to Emil Falck (1865–1914). He carried out significant expands and alterations on the part of the property that faced Toldbodvej. He was also the owner of the country house Flynderupgård near Helsingør.

In 1918, the property was acquired by vintner Georg Bestle for DKK 525,000.

The composer and chamber musician Fini Henriques (1867–1940) resided at Esplanaden 46 from 1934. Toldbodcaféen, a restaurant, was based in the building in the 1930s. In 2008, Amaliegade 45 was owned by Ejdsselskabet Frederiksstad APS.

== Architecture ==
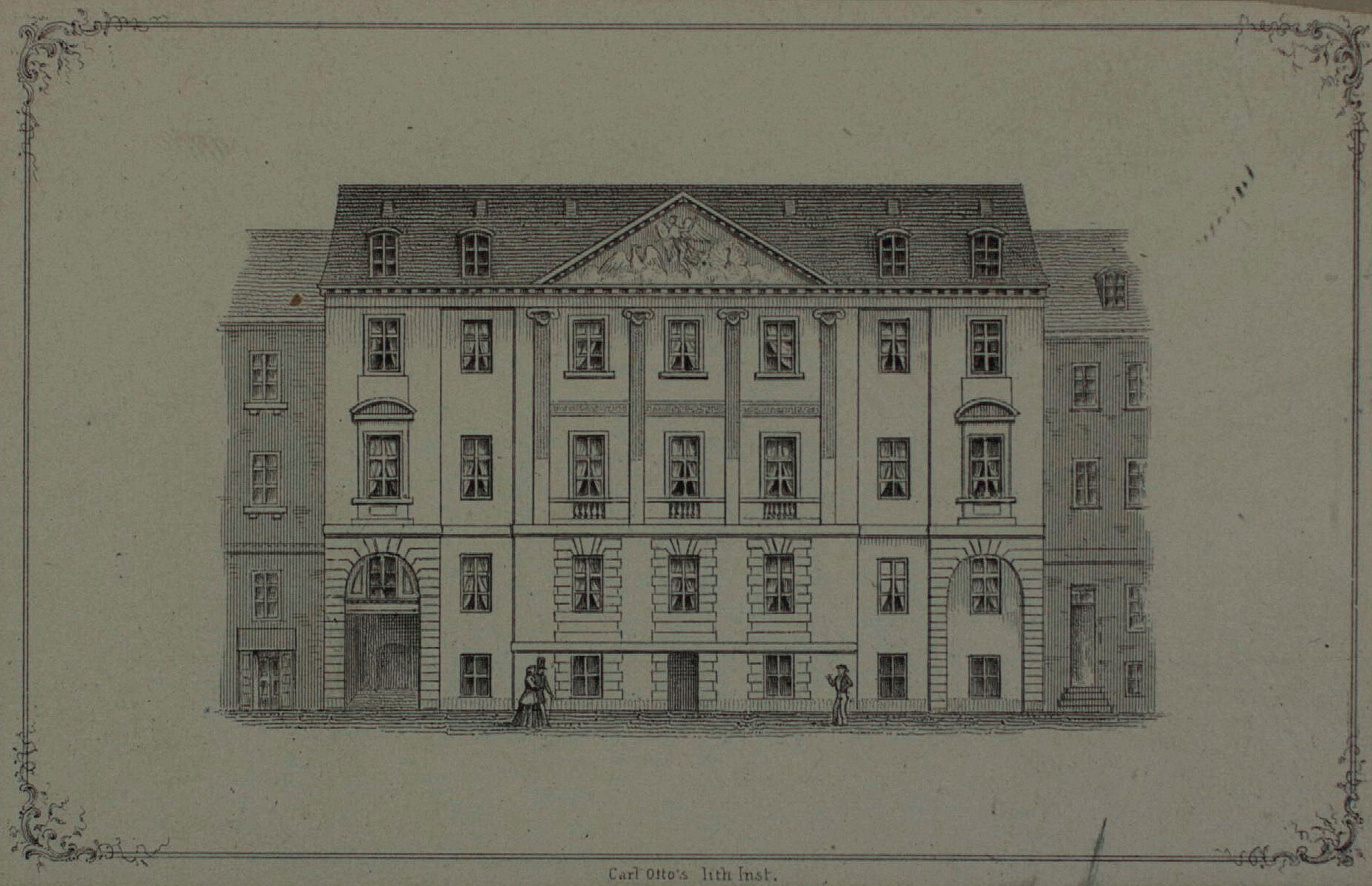
Drawing of the original facade

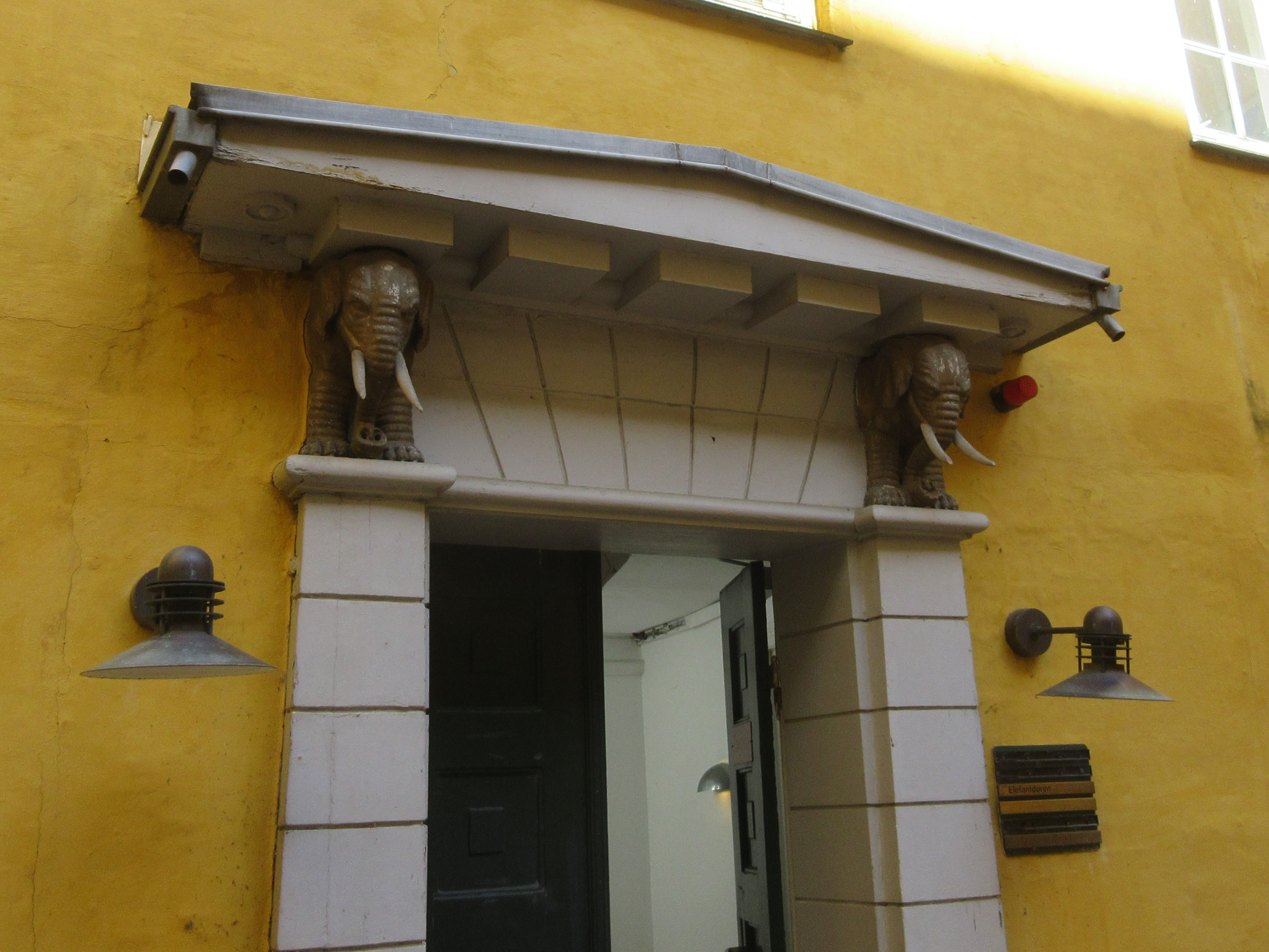
The hood mould supported by elephant heads in the yard.

The facade was most likely designed by Jørgen Henrich Rawert. The seven-bay facade features a three-bay median risalit and two single-bay lateral risalits. The three risalits are finished with shadow joints on the ground floor. The median risalit is decorated with giant order Ionic pilasters on the upper storeys, blind balustradess under the windows on the first storey, and a meander frieze. It was originally tipped by a triangular pediment. It was replaced by the current three-bay wall dormer in 1857. The windows of the lateral risalits are topped by hood moulds on the first storey. A brown gate topped by a fanlight is located in the southern corner risalit. The cellar entrance and ground storey window in the northern corner risalit is placed in a shallow, arched niche to create an impression of symmetry.

The interior walls of the gateway are decorated with pilasters and relief medallions with motifs by Bertel Thorvaldsen. A door in the northern wall of the gateway opens to the principal staircase of the building.

An eight-bay perpendicular side wing extends from the rear side of the building. It was expanded by one storey in 1857. The red tile roof is penetrated by a tall chimney. The central of the three doors is topped by a hood mould supported by two elephant heads.

== Today ==
The building was in 2008 owned by the property company Frederiksstad Aps. It has been converted into office space.

== Gallery ==
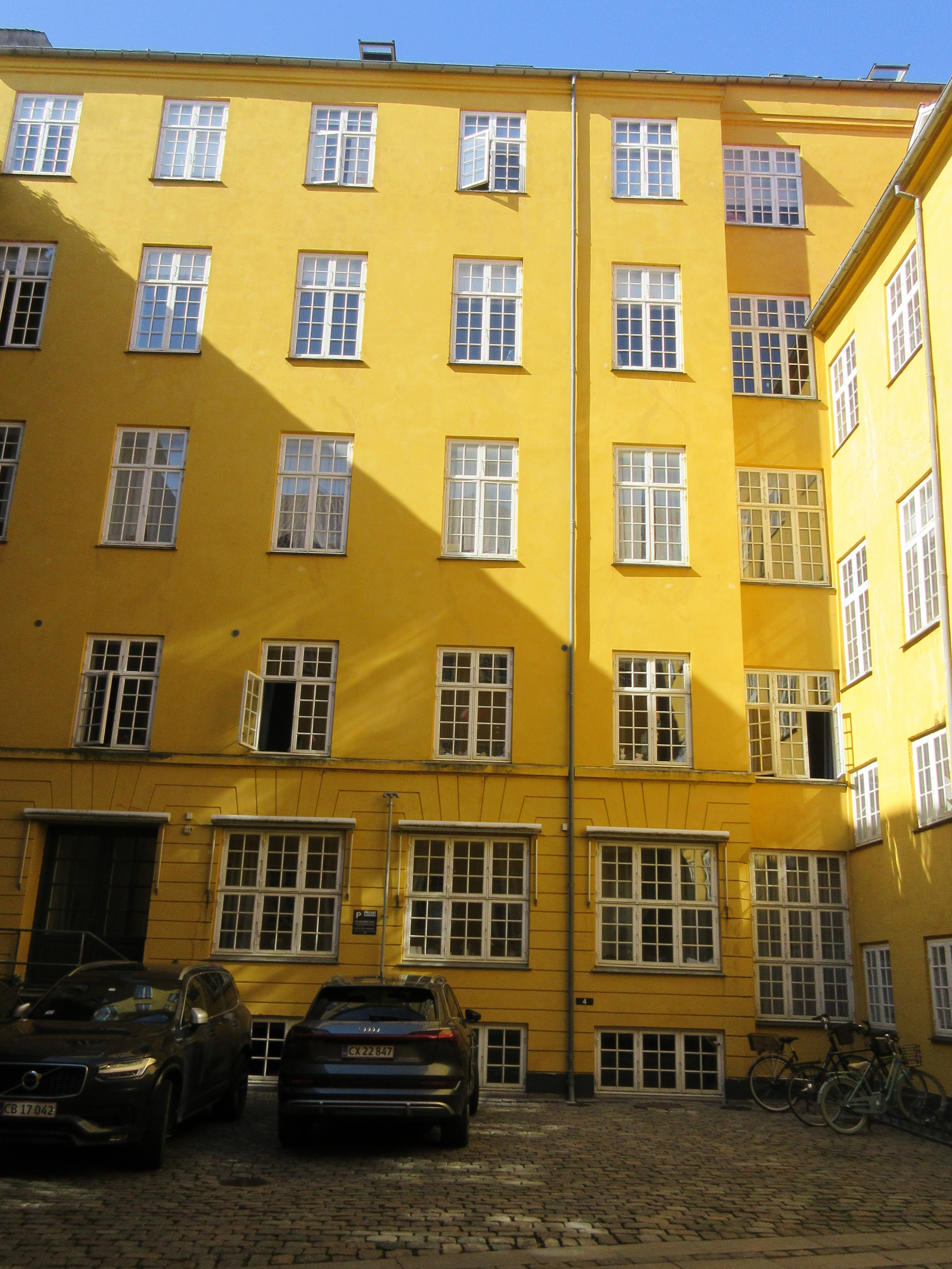
Rear wing

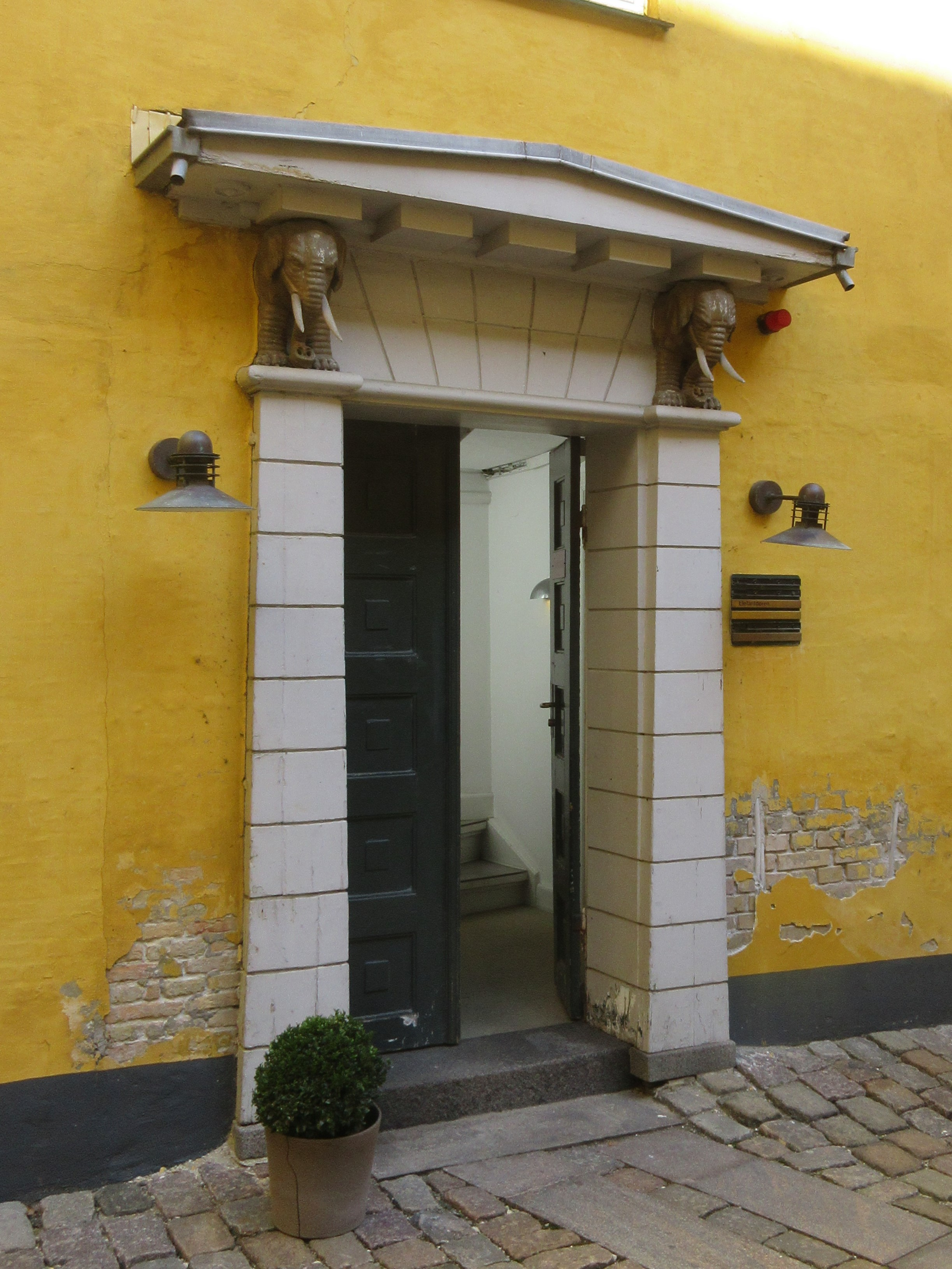
Door in the yard.

== Commemorative plaque ==
A plaque on the building commemorates Helmuth Neumann (1911–1944) who was killed at the site during World War II.
