= View from the Artist's Window =

Painting by Martinus Rørbye

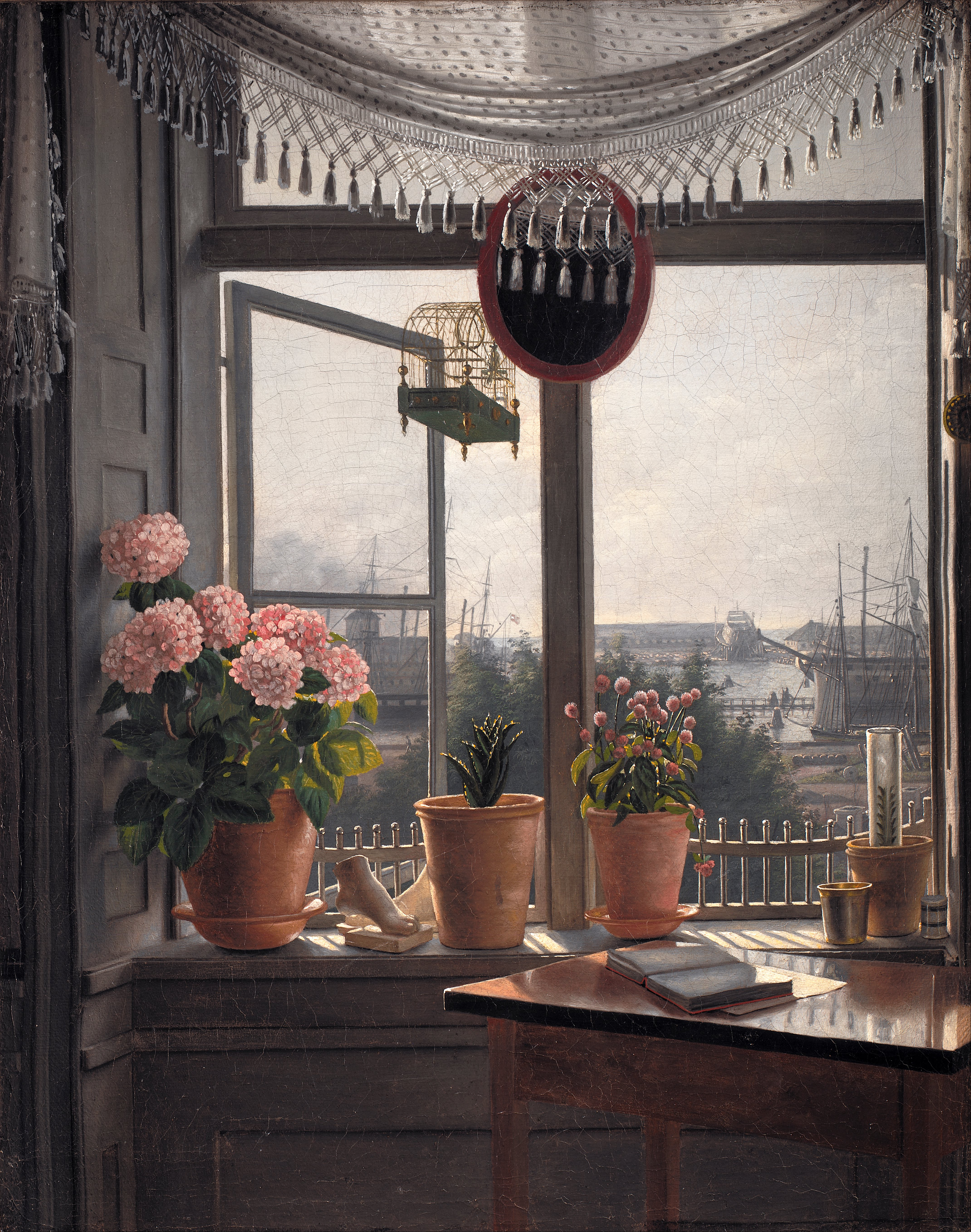
View from the Artist's Window by Martinus Rørbye 1825

View from the Artist's Window (Danish: Udsigt fra kunstnerens vindue) is a painting from 1825 by Martinus Rørbye, depicting the view from his childhood home at Amaliegade 45 in Copenhagen. The painting is in the Statens Museum for Kunst in Copenhagen. The painting is considered one of the highlights of the Danish Golden Age painting. It incorporates themes and symbols that resonated with its audience. (Note: "Around the mid-1820s Rørbye found himself in a time of transition on several levels. On a personal level he was about to leave his childhood home where this view from the drawing-room window was painted. ...These different aspects of transition left their mark on the scene. The familiar closeness of the drawing room is contrasted with the sailing ships in the harbour, bound for faraway destinations. The cage in the window occupies a transitional position between the indoors and the outdoors, thereby emphasising the symbolism of the imprisoned bird. ... On the windowsill, flowers in different stages of growth reflect the stages of human life: The small cutting to the right is balanced by the flowering hydrangea and the partially withered flower in the middle of the picture. Out in the harbour the flowers are matched by three warships: the middle ship is still under construction, the right one has no rigging, leaving only the ship on the left seaworthy. During the Romantic era, open windows and ships on the sea became popular themes with symbolic undertones")

== Background ==
Rørbye was born to Danish parents in Norway, but he grew up in Copenhagen. His father bought the large property at Amaliegade 45 in around 1817. Rørbye studied painting at the Royal Danish Academy of Fine Arts for just under ten years. He was influenced by the artists Johann Christian Dahl, Horace Vernet and Caspar David Friedrich. His teacher at the academy was Christian August Lorentzen (1746–1828), but he took additional private lessons from Christoffer Wilhelm Eckersberg.

Rørbye became a fashionable artist through selling paintings to the Danish royal family, and by numerous commissions by the middle classes of Copenhagen for portraits set in interiors. An inveterate traveler, he made the Grand Tour in 1834–37, travelling to Paris, Rome, Sicily, Greece and Turkey. In Paris he studied French contemporary art. Later he became a professor at the Copenhagen Academy. Following Eckersberg's example, Rørbye was essentially a realist. His pictures were factual but displayed a uniquely sympathetic view of the people he painted.

View from the Artist's Window was made as Rørbye was about to leave his childhood home—a time when his ideas about art were changing through his studies with Eckersberg and the influence of Romanticism.

== Description and themes ==
External videos
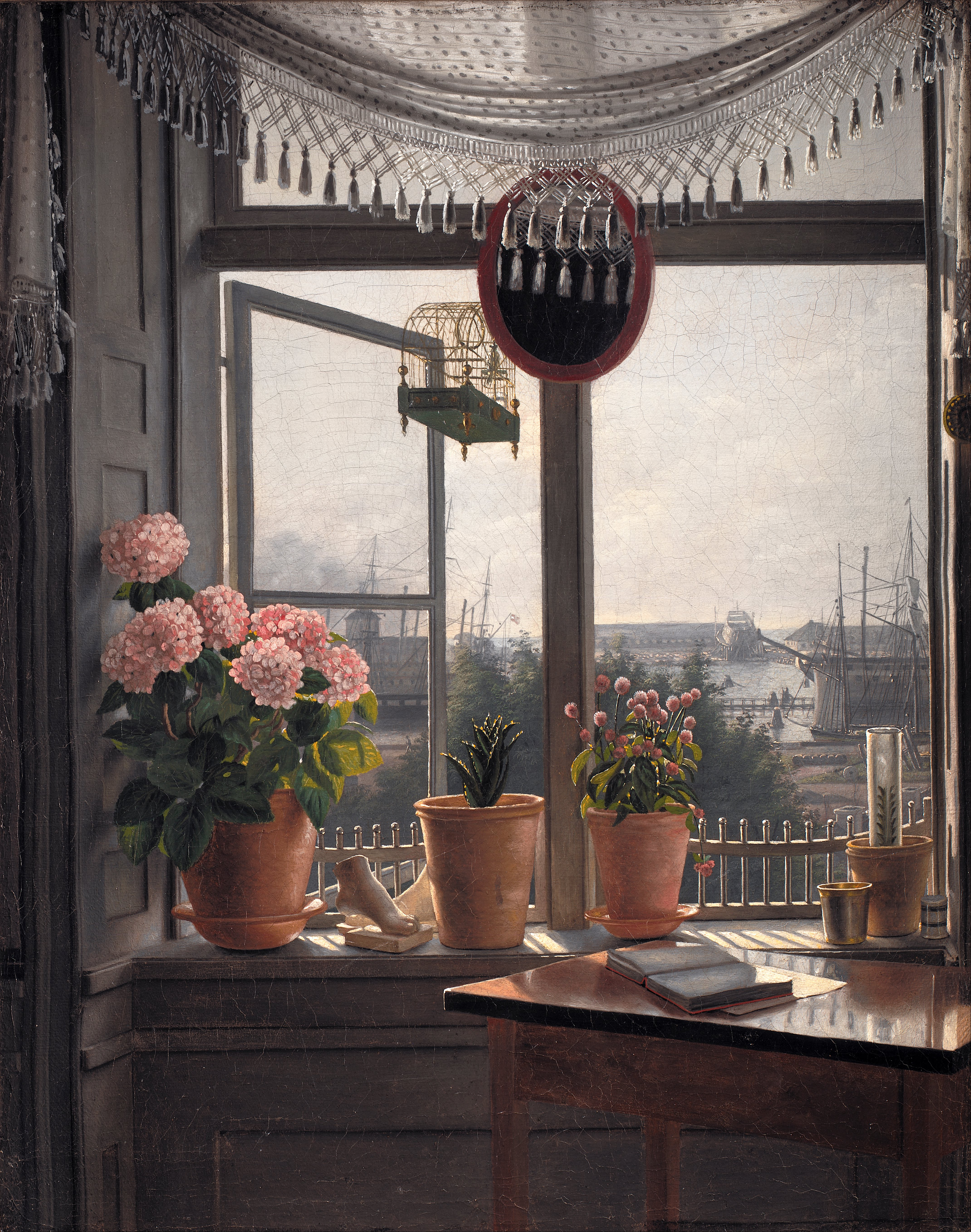
- Symbolism in View from the Artist's Window
- Symbolism in View from the Artist's Window II

The painting depicts the artist's view from his window at his parents' house Amaliegade 45. The view is of Flådestation Holmen, a naval dockyard, with a ketch and four warships, one of which is under construction on the slips. Two ropewalks are visible, as is the masting house with its crane. On the ledge in front of the windows are several plants in pots, and two plaster casts of feet, one a child's and the other an adult's. One of the plants is a cutting, encased in a glass tube. (Note: "There are gems by other artists in the show, such as "View from the Artist's Window" (1825), painted by Martinus Rorbye, a Dane, at the age of twenty-two. There's no longing, but only brilliant satisfaction in his windowsill array of potted plants—hydrangea, amaranth, agave—backlit against boats at harbor. The "Golden Age" of Danish painting, which the work exemplifies, is far too little known in America. It was a fleeting efflorescence after the country's catastrophic loss of power and prosperity in 1807, when Lord Nelson obliterated its naval forces at Copenhagen. Many of the non-Danish painters in the show, including Friedrich, studied in Denmark, where Romanticism took an ecstatic, precisionist, light-intoxicated turn.")

Like most paintings of the Romantic era, the painting has many underlying symbolic meanings. The window open towards the light; the ships in the harbour on their way to foreign destinations symbolize the longing for an unknown calling; the cage with the imprisoned bird above the window occupies a transitional position between the inside and the world outside the parental home, in this case a prison for the artist longing to explore the world outside. On the windowsill, potted plants symbolize the different stages of growth of human life – for Romantic painters the image of creative Genius was often symbolized by a plant or flowers growing from a seed into a big plant that develops towards the sky, having its own cycle of life, setting seeds of its own, nourished by water and light. A sketchbook with empty pages – also placed on the windowsill – is waiting to be filled, while the inside of the room where the artist is painting is reflected in the oval mirror hanging in the window. (Note: "Romanticism–also the Romantic adventurer, the 'entrepreneur' of history, the archetype of genius. .... then, is seen to be analogous with the growth of a plant, whose evolutionary ...")
