= A Large Ship Under Caulking at Frederikshavn =

1847 painting by Martinus Rørbye

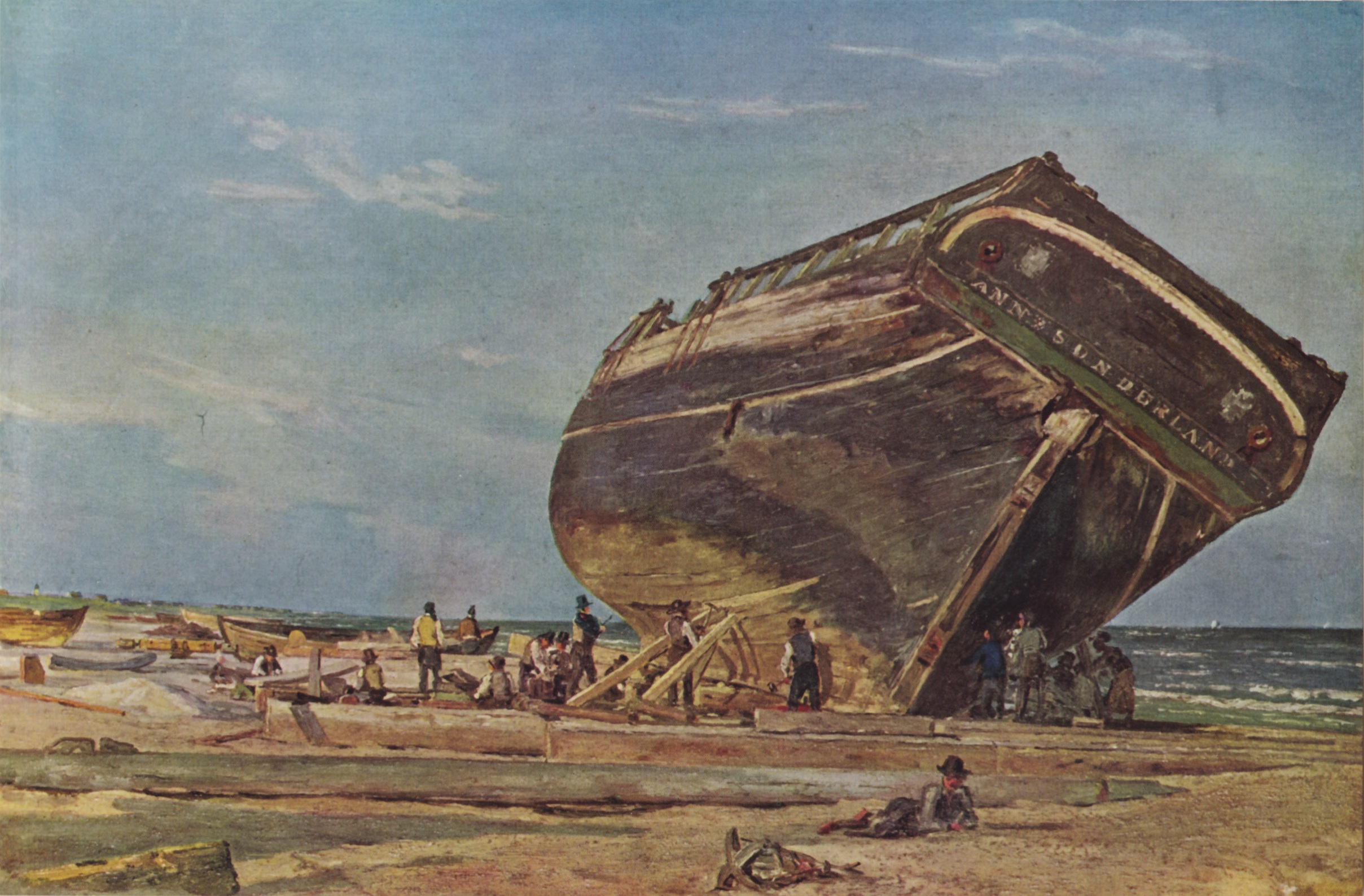
- Artist: Martinus Rørbye
- Year: 1847
- Medium: Oil on canvas
- Movement: Danish Golden Age
- Dimensions: 37 cm × 55.5 cm (15 in × 21.9 in)
- Location: Louvre, Paris

A Large Ship Under Caulking at Frederikshavn is an 1847 oil-on-canvas painting by Martinus Rørbye depicting a beach scene with fishermen working on a large ship hull. In 2023, it was acquired by the Louvre.

== Background ==
Rørbye was the most travelled of the Danish Golden Age painters. He also visited the northern part of Jutland several times. His first visit took place in 1830. The aim of the journey was to visit his uncle Gerard Feye. In 1833 he became one of the first Danish painters to visit Skagen in the far north of Jutland. The painting was created during a later visit to the area.

== Description ==
The ship seen in the picture is the schooner Ann Sunderland. The title indicates that the ship is under caulking (that is that it is under sealing with fibrous material such as scratched-up rope or bluing) but it has been subject to discussion whether that is in fact what is going on in the picture. Henrik Bramsen has thus pointed out that this cannot be the right description of what is actually going on since it is not likely that such a large hull would be placed on the beach to be sealed. It is more likely that the hull is in the process of being cut up for timber. Jørgen Elsøe Jensen has reached the opposite conclusion,

In the article Martinus Rørbye og Skagen, Elisabeth Fabricius gives a detailed explanation of the motif: "The schooner Ann of Sunderland was shipwrecked on Skagen Reef on 27 November 1846. The ship's cargo of wheat was salvaged and sold during December. The wreck itself was sold on 31 December and towed away from Grenen". According to Fabritius, it is quite likely that it was Anna Ancher's maternal grandfather, Søren Møllebygger, who was responsible for breaking up the ship wreck. He owned two sawmills, and his accounts show that he had expenses related to the scrapping of the wreck in February and March 1847.

== Related works ==
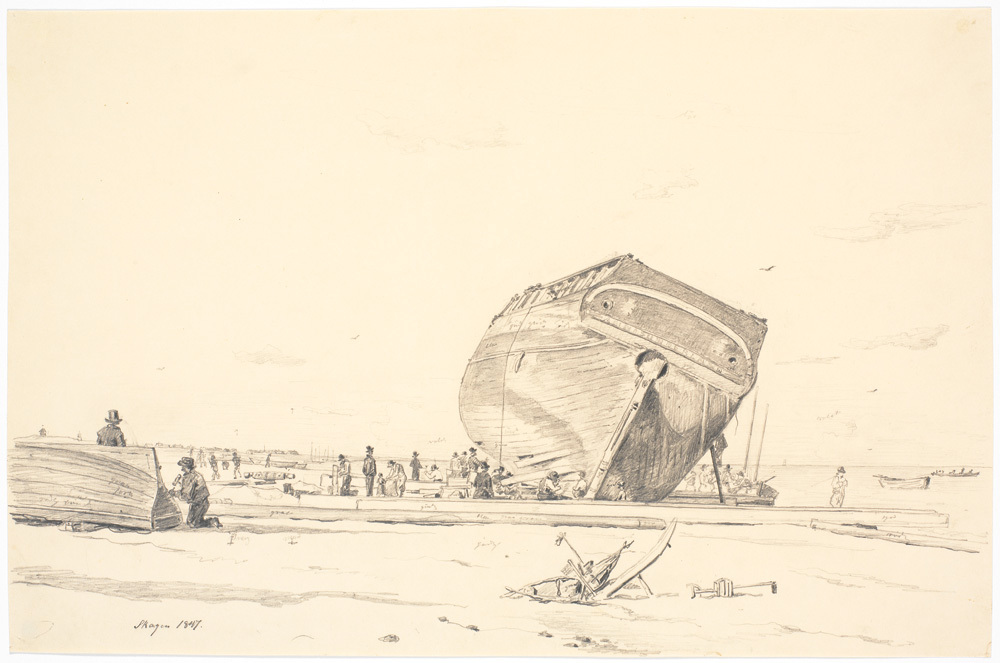
The almost identical drawing in the National Gallery of Denmark.

An almost identical preliminary study for the painting, dated Skagen 1847, was acquired by the National Gallery of Denmark in 1949. The drawing was exhibited at the Metropolitan Museum of Art as part of the exhibition "Beyond the Light" from 26 January to 16 April 2023, and then at the J. Paul Getty Museum from 23 May to 20 August 2023.
