= Christian August Lorentzen =

Danish painter (1749–1828)

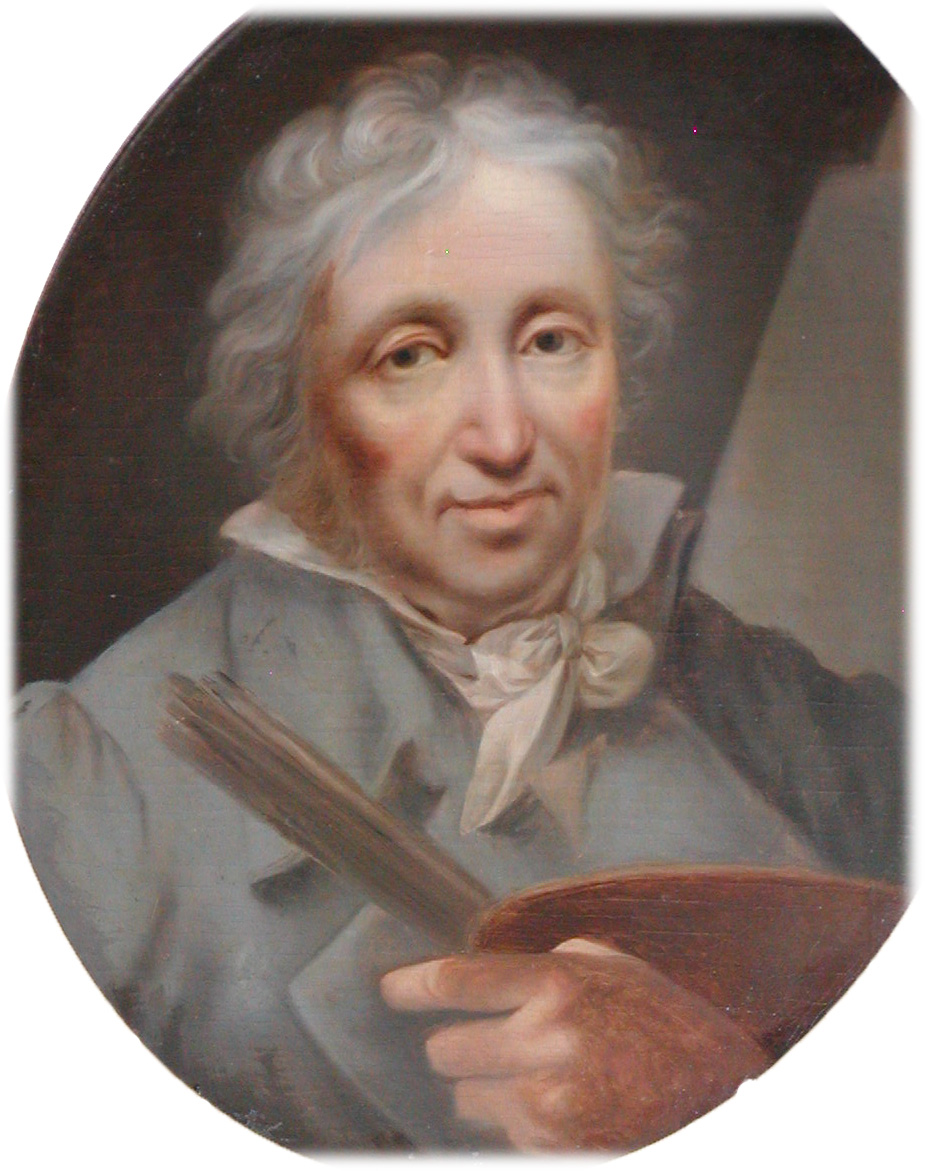
- Self-portrait
- Born: 10 August 1749; Sønderborg
- Died: 8 May 1828 (aged 78); Copenhagen
- Known for: Painter
- Movement: Neoclassicism

Christian August Lorentzen (10 August 1749 – 8 May 1828) was a Danish painter.

== Early life and education ==
Christian August Lorentzen was born in Sønderborg, Denmark. He was the son of Hans Peter Lorentzen and Maria Christina Hansdatter. His father was a watchmaker. He arrived in Copenhagen around 1771 where he frequented the Royal Academy of Fine Arts but it is unclear whether he received formal training. After arriving in Copenhagen, he was soon used as a portrait painter. From 1779 to 1782 he went abroad to develop his skills, visiting the Netherlands, Antwerp and Paris where he copied old masters. In 1792 he traveled to Norway to paint prospects.

== Career ==
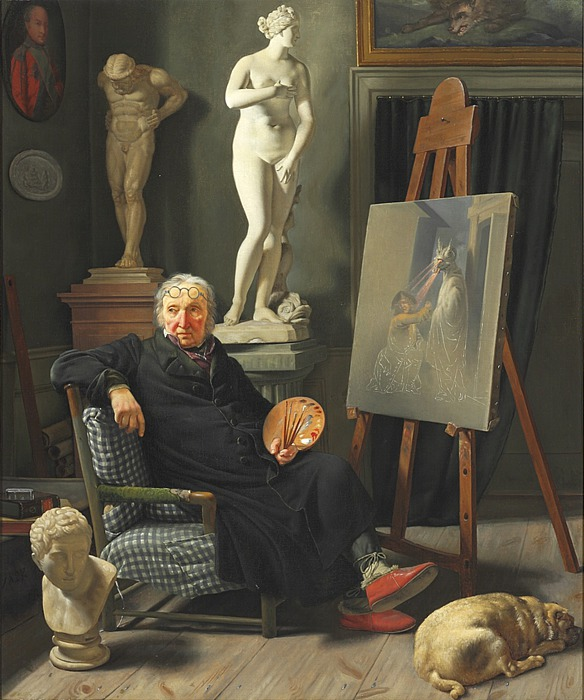
C. A. Lorentzen in his studio by Martinus Rørbye, painted before 1828

After returning home in 1782, he became a more versatile artist. In a number of painting, such as Slaget på Reden (Battle of Copenhagen. 1801) at Danish Museum of National History and Den rædsomste nat (The Awful Night. 1807) at Danish National Gallery, he documented key events from the English Wars between 1801 and 1814. Later in his career he mainly painted portraits, landscapes and scenes from the comedies of Ludvig Holberg (1684–1754).

He was professor at the Royal Academy in Copenhagen from 1803 and until his death in 1828. He followed Nicolai Abildgaard (1743–1809) as the Academy Director from 1809 to 1810. He exercised great influence on the next generation of painters such as Martinus Rørbye (1803–1848) among others.

== Gallery ==
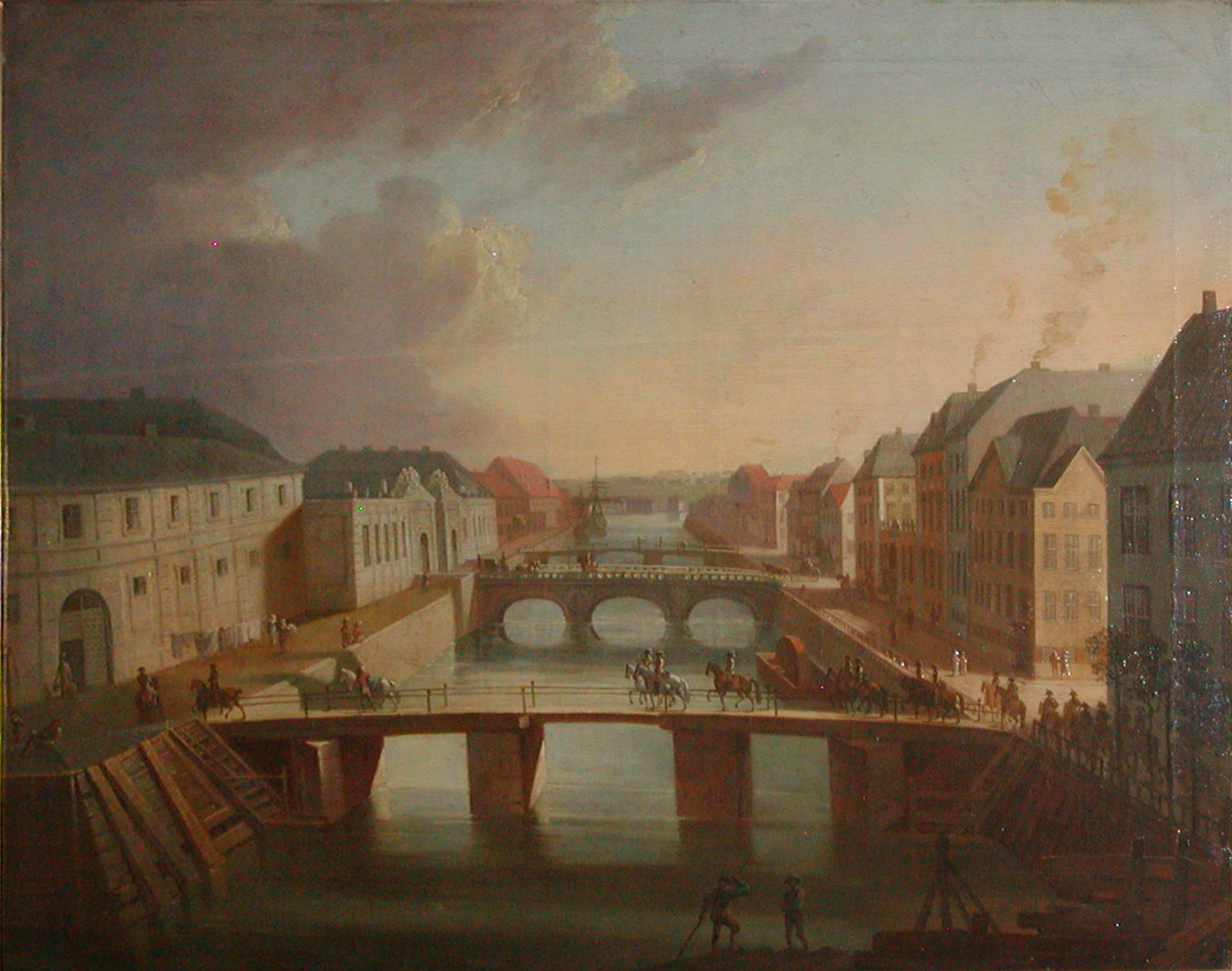
Frederiksholm Canal in Copenhagen (1794)

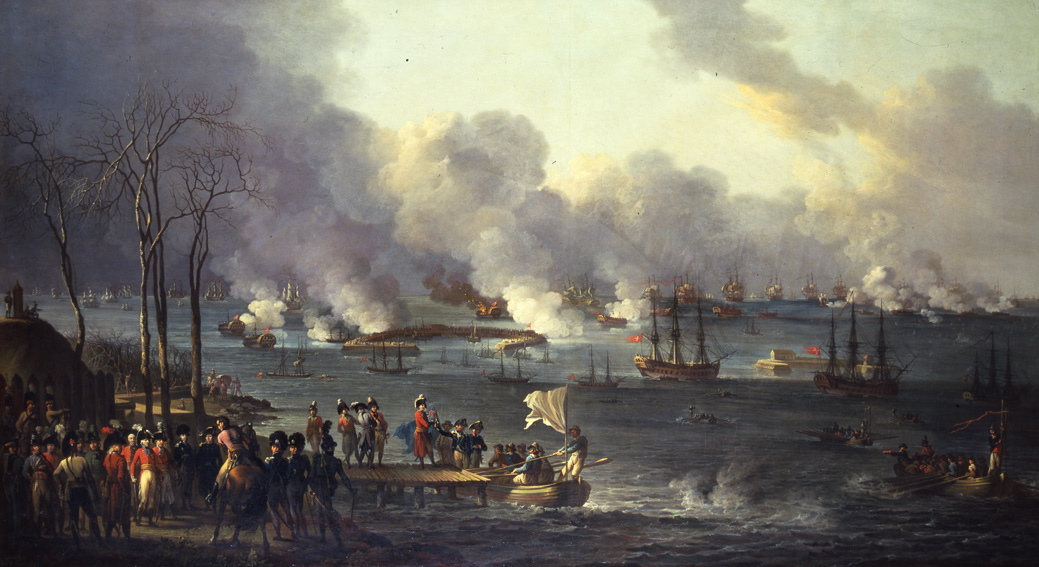
Battle of Copenhagen (1801)

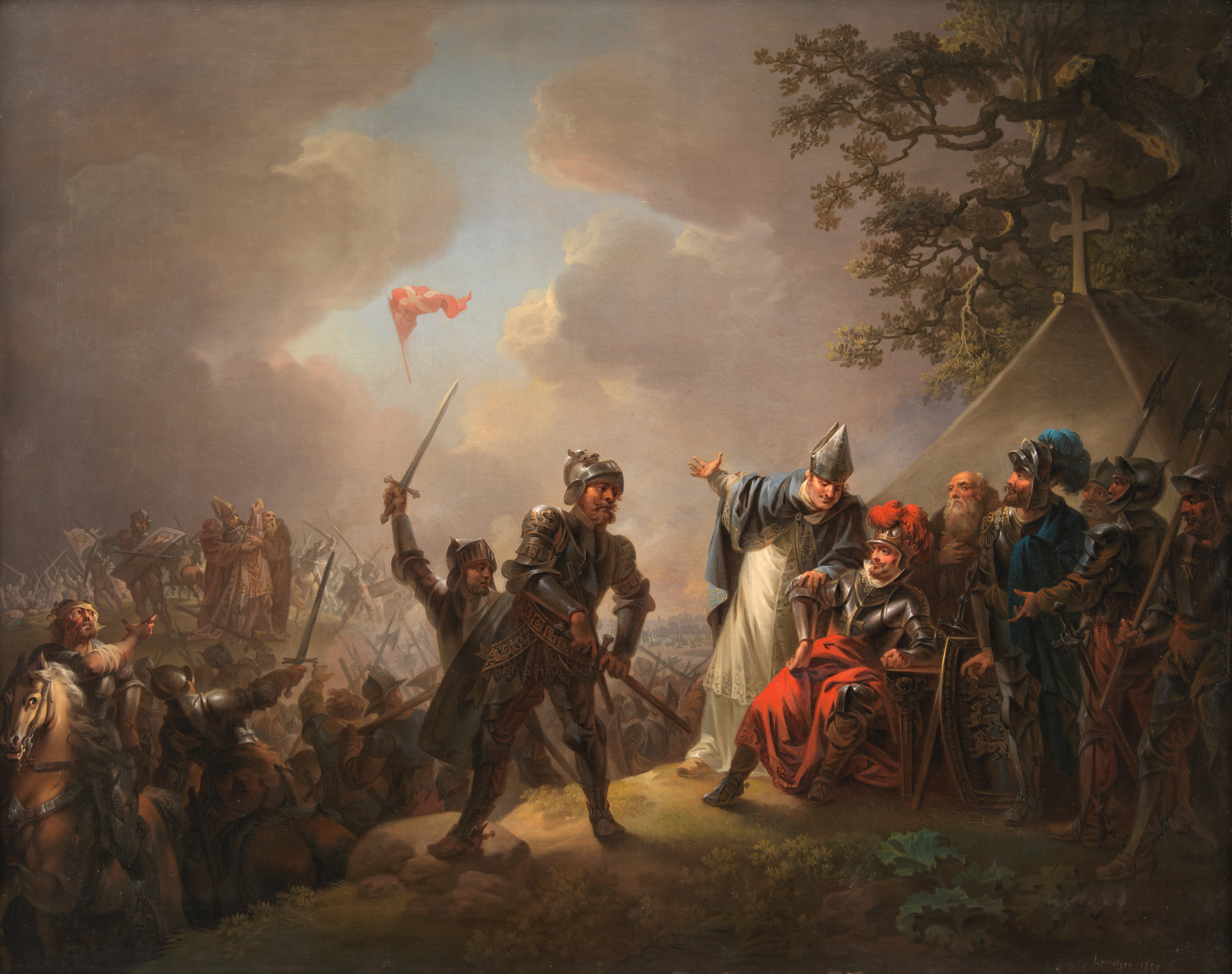
Dannebrog falling from
heaven during the
Battle of Lindanise (1809)

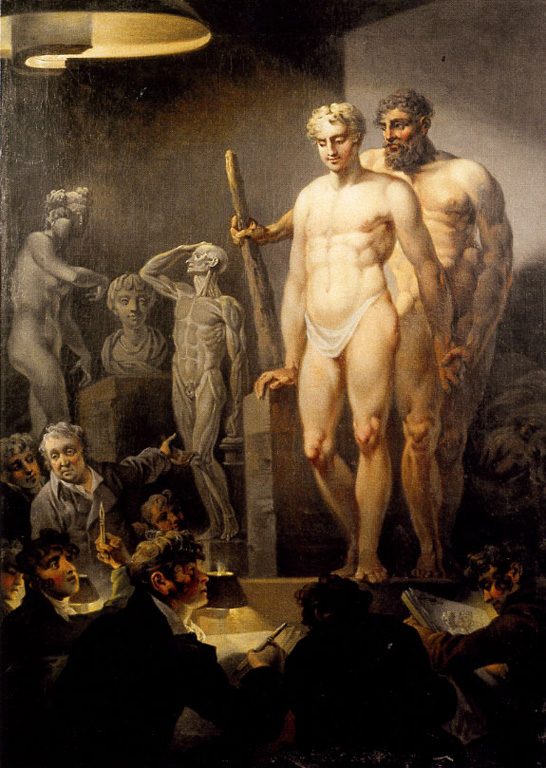
Model class at the Danish Academy (ca. 1824)

== See also ==
- Art of Denmark

Cultural offices
| Preceded by Nikolaj Abraham Abildgaard | Director of the Royal Danish Academy of Fine Arts; 1809–1810 | Succeeded by Christian Frederik Hansen |
