= Martinus Rørbye =

Danish artist (1803–1848)

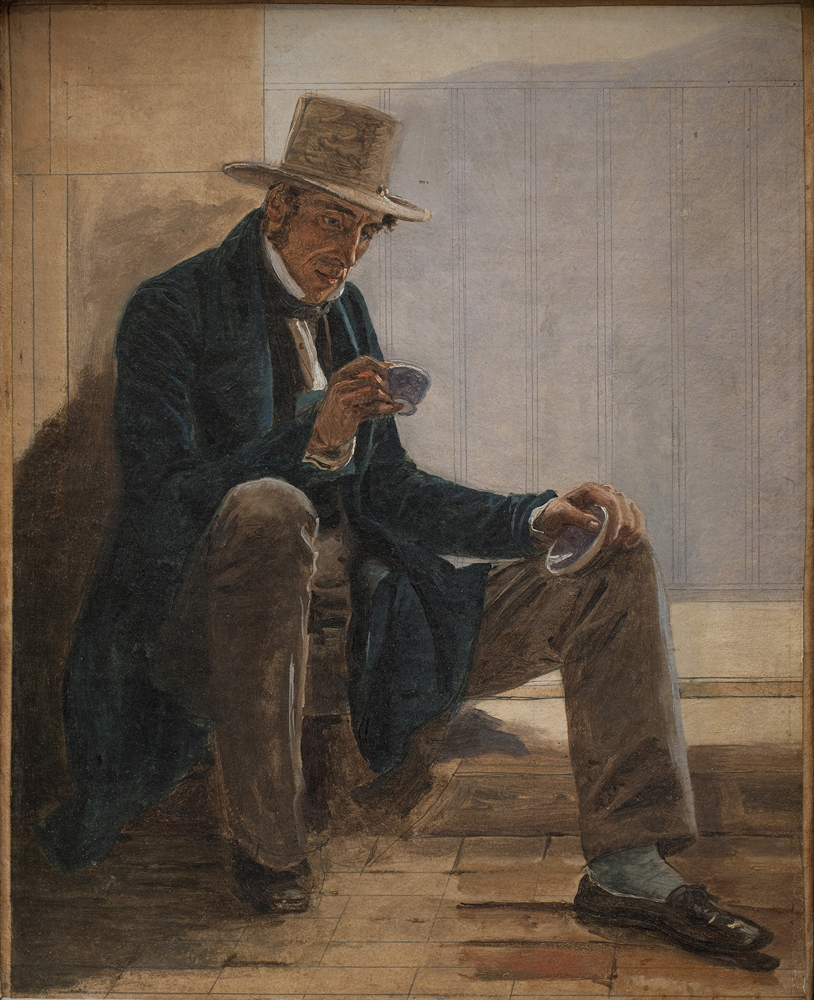
- Portrait study of the Painter Rörby, by Constantin Hansen (1837)
- Born: Martinus Christian Wesseltoft Rørbye; 17 May 1803; Drammen, Denmark–Norway
- Died: 29 August 1848 (aged 45); Copenhagen, Denmark
- Resting place: Holmen Cemetery, Copenhagen
- Education: Royal Danish Academy of Fine Arts
- Known for: Painting
- Movement: Danish Golden Age

Martinus Christian Wesseltoft Rørbye (Danish: [mɑˈtsʰiːnus ˈʁɶɐ̯ˌpyˀ]; 17 May 1803 – 29 August 1848) was a Danish painter, known both for genre works and landscapes. He was a central figure of the Golden Age of Danish painting during the first half of the 19th century.

The most traveled of the Danish Golden Age painters, he traveled both north to Norway and Sweden and south to Italy, Greece and Constantinople. He was also the first Danish painter to take to painting in Skagen at the northern top of Jutland, almost half a century before the thriving community of Skagen Painters formed and came to fame, through Michael Ancher, Anna Ancher and P.S. Krøyer.

== Early life and education ==
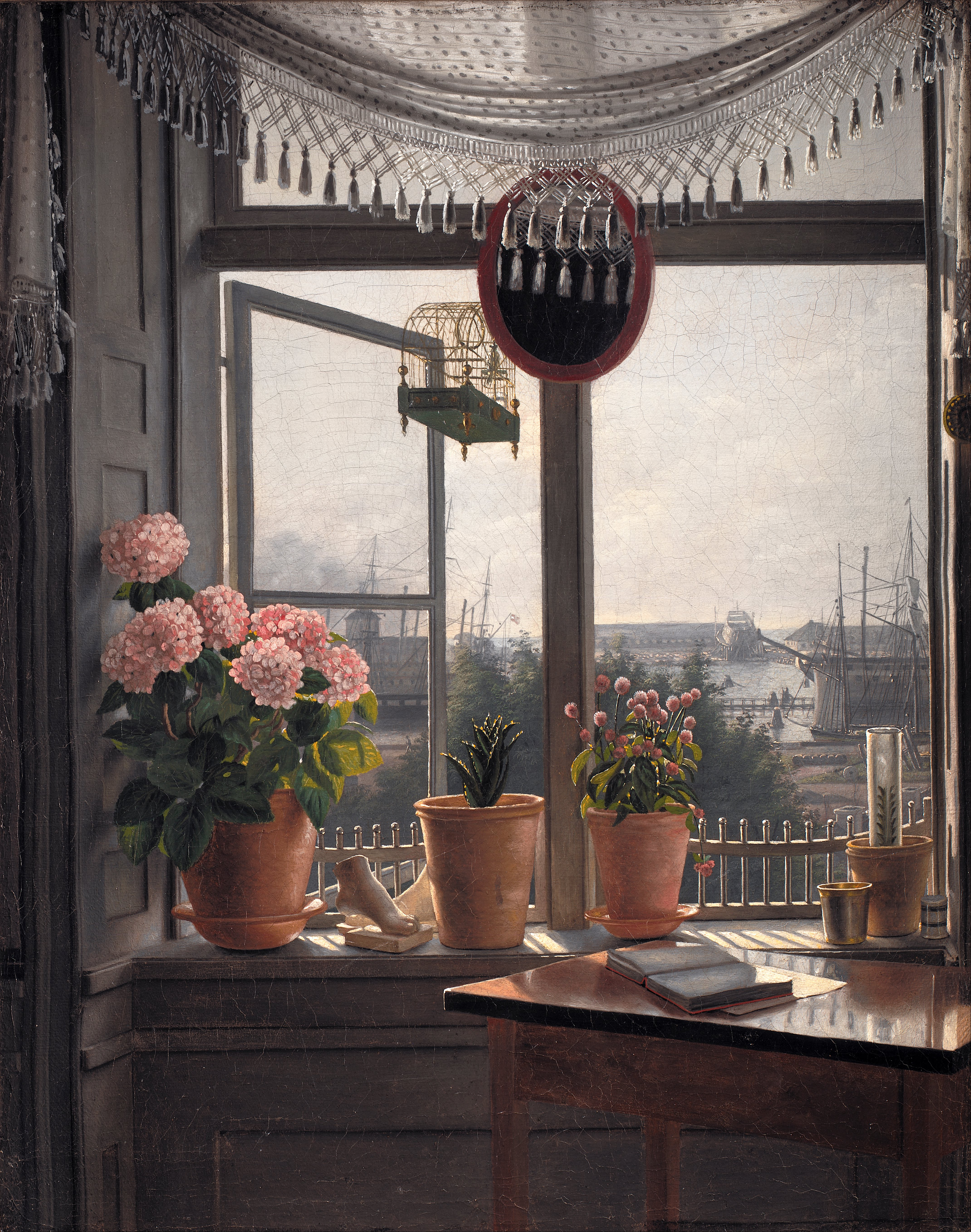
View from the Artist's Window

Martinus Rørbye was born in Drammen in Norway on 17 May 1803 to Danish parents Ferdinand Henrik Rørbye and his wife Frederikke Eleonore Catherine de Stockfleth. Martinus was not inclined to schooling, but in 1820 started his studies at the Royal Danish Academy of Fine Arts at 17 years of age. He studied under Christian August Lorentzen and Christoffer Wilhelm Eckersberg, a strong influence on a generation of artists during the Danish Golden Age. Rørbye was a favorite student of Eckersberg, and they formed a close association. He took to Eckersberg's careful attention to nature and his strivings to capture details realistically. He was also greatly influenced by Lorentzen's use of color.

He won the Academy's small silver medal in 1824, and the large silver medal in 1828. He competed for the gold medal and won a cash prize. In 1829 he won the small gold medal for his painting Christ healing the blind, which remains in the ownership of the Royal Danish Academy. He never won the large gold medal in spite of repeated attempts.

View from the Artist's Window, is a painting by a young Rørbye around 1825, heralding the many travels he would later make with its depiction of a caged bird in an open window, on the border between the safety of his parents' home and the wide, unknown world represented by a berthed ship.

== Early career ==
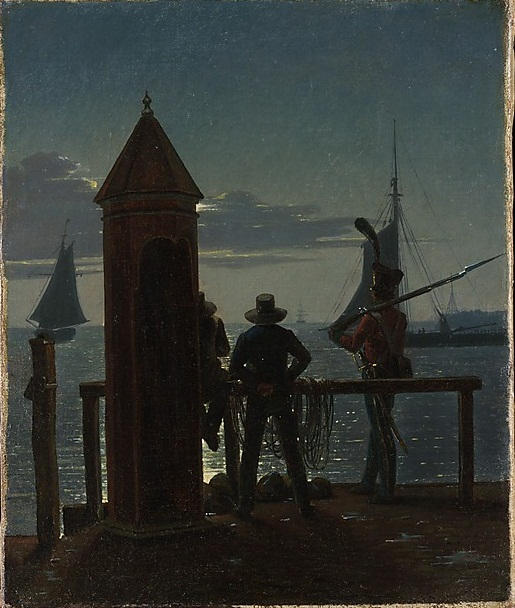
View from the Citadel Ramparts in Copenhagen by Moonlight

Rørbye first exhibited his paintings at Charlottenborg in 1824 and would do so almost every year until 1848. His works were modestly priced, and he found sufficient buyers for his pieces. The majority of his works in the 1820s consisted of views from Copenhagen and the island of Zealand, although he also painted a number of portraits including one of Lorentzen, his painting instructor.

Twice, in 1830 and 1832, he traveled to Norway. On the first of these journeys he visited Jutland on the way, a rare destination for painters at that time. On 31 May 1830 he went to Århus on the paddle steamer Dania. Another passenger on the ship was Hans Christian Andersen and the two artists decided to travel together for a while. From Århus they went north, staying at the Rosenholm, Clausholm and Tjele estates. After that, Rørbye parted with Andersen, continuing to the remote and seldom-visited Thy province of north-western Jutland to visit relatives in Thisted. From his journals it can be concluded that he found the place deeply exotic, making detailed sketches and notes of everything from women's costumes and markets to the scenery. However, he found the landscape unsuitable for painting due to the lack of trees. On 7 July he left Thisted bound for Norway.

In Norway he painted landscapes under the influence of Johan Christian Dahl and Caspar David Friedrich.

== Adventurous travels and later career ==
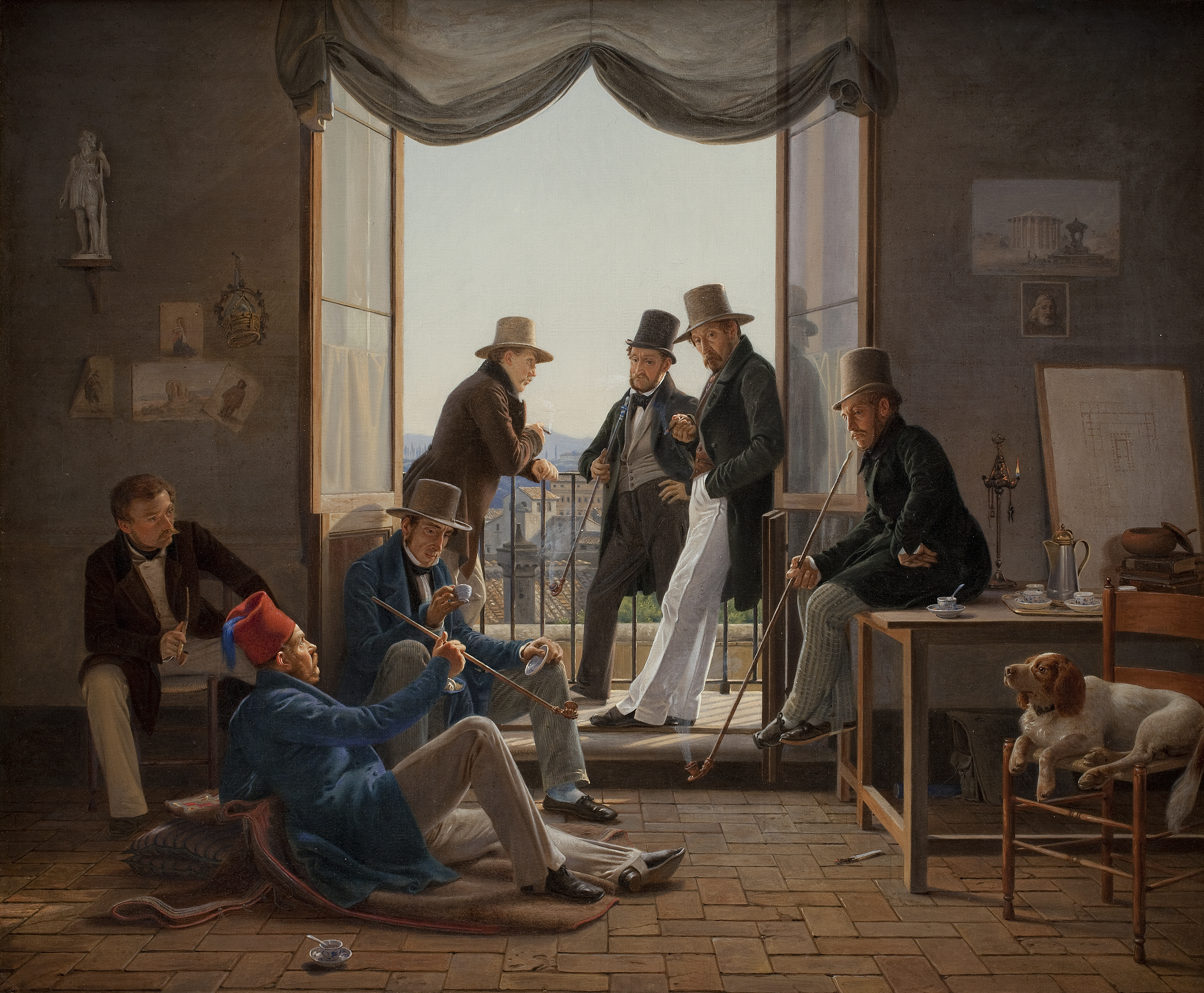
A company of Danish artists in Rome

In 1834 Rørbye received a travel scholarship from the Academy on account of his talents as a portraitist. He traveled by way of the Netherlands and France to Rome, In Paris he met Peter Andreas Heiberg, August Bournonville and the French painter Jean Auguste Dominique Ingres.

When he arrived in Rome, he joined the city's thriving Danish artists community which had Bertel Thorvaldsen as its central figure. A Group of Danish Artists in Rome, is a painting depicting the artist in Rome, painted by Constantin Hansen. Rørbye is number two from the left sitting behind Bindesbøll who is lying on the floor with a fez he often wore after their visit to Constantinople. Also appearing in the picture are the painter himself, Marstrand, Küchler, Blunck and Jørgen Sonne, sitting on the table.

In Italy he traveled to Sorrento, the Sabine Mountains, and Sicily. The following year Rørbye traveled to Athens accompanied by the architect Michael Gottlieb Bindesbøll, one of the compatriots he had met in Rome. From there they continued to Constantinople in the Ottoman Empire, a rare adventure in those days. He sketched prodigiously during his travels.

== Return to Denmark ==
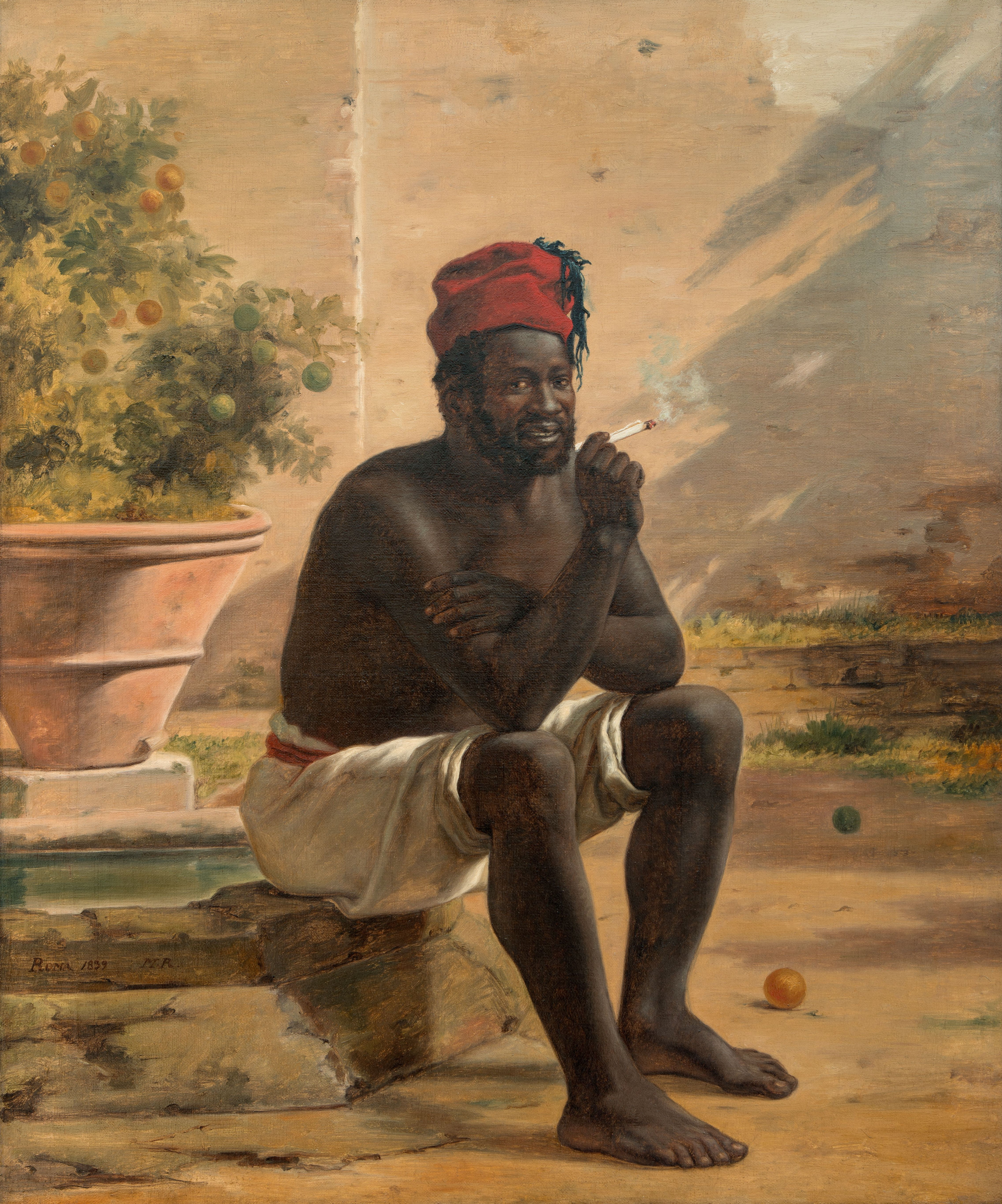
A Sitting Nubian

In 1837 he returned home to Copenhagen. His excellent orientalist studies from these exotic locales brought him the Danish public's attention. The Academy, recognizing the excellence of his work during his travels, invited him to apply for membership by submitting a painting. His task was to create a Turkish folk scene. His motif came from a study of a Caravan near Smyrna. It was finished in 1838 and he was unanimously voted into the Academy. His studies from Greece and Turkey continued to serve as the basis for his creative output. In this regard he admired the work of French painter Horace Vernet.

That same year at the Spring Exhibition he received the Exhibition Medal, the first time it had been given out, for a painting of a scene outside the Kılıç Ali Pasha Complex, A Turkish notary witnesses a marriage contract. Typical of Rørbye are the rich colours and careful attention to detail.

He married Rose Frederikke Schiøtt on 29 August 1839. His health was not good, however, and that same autumn he traveled again to Italy in the hope of renewing his strength. He painted "Torvet i Amalfi" ("The plaza in Amalfi") during this stay, and it was exhibited in 1842. He returned home in 1841.

He gave private painting lessons to Christen Dalsgaard, and in 1844 became professor at the Academy's school of modelling. His health deteriorated, and he died on 29 August 1848 in Copenhagen, leaving his young wife widowed and with several small children. She exhibited twelve of his paintings, mostly of Italian subjects, in 1849.

== Works ==
He is remembered for his genre paintings, his landscapes and his architectural paintings, as well as for the many sketches he made during his numerous travels. He painted numerous scenes of life in Copenhagen, as well as large compositions showing Italian and Turkish landscapes and scenes of folk life. He painted few portraits.

He was one of the most traveled of the Golden Age painters, and distinguished his artistic production by his interpretations of lands rarely explored at that time for their artistic motifs, as well as for his anecdotal genre paintings depicting the Copenhagen of his day.

== Discovering Skagen ==
Rørbye visited Skagen on three occasions, painting the local fishermen and the North Sea environs. The first time was in 1833, the year before he set out on his travels to the Mediterranean area and almost half a century before the community of Skagen Painters formed in the town and came to fame. He returned to Skagen towards the end of his life, in the summers of 1847 and 1848. His painting of Men of Skagen on a summer evening in fair weather was one of the last he completed. His works appear in a number of Danish art museums, including the Danish National Gallery (Statens Museum for Kunst), the Ny Carlsberg Glyptotek, and the Hirschsprung Collection.

Martinus Rørbye's works

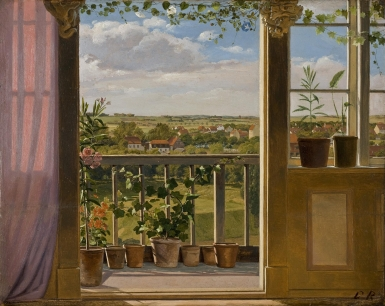
Nørrevold mod Bellahøj, c. 1830

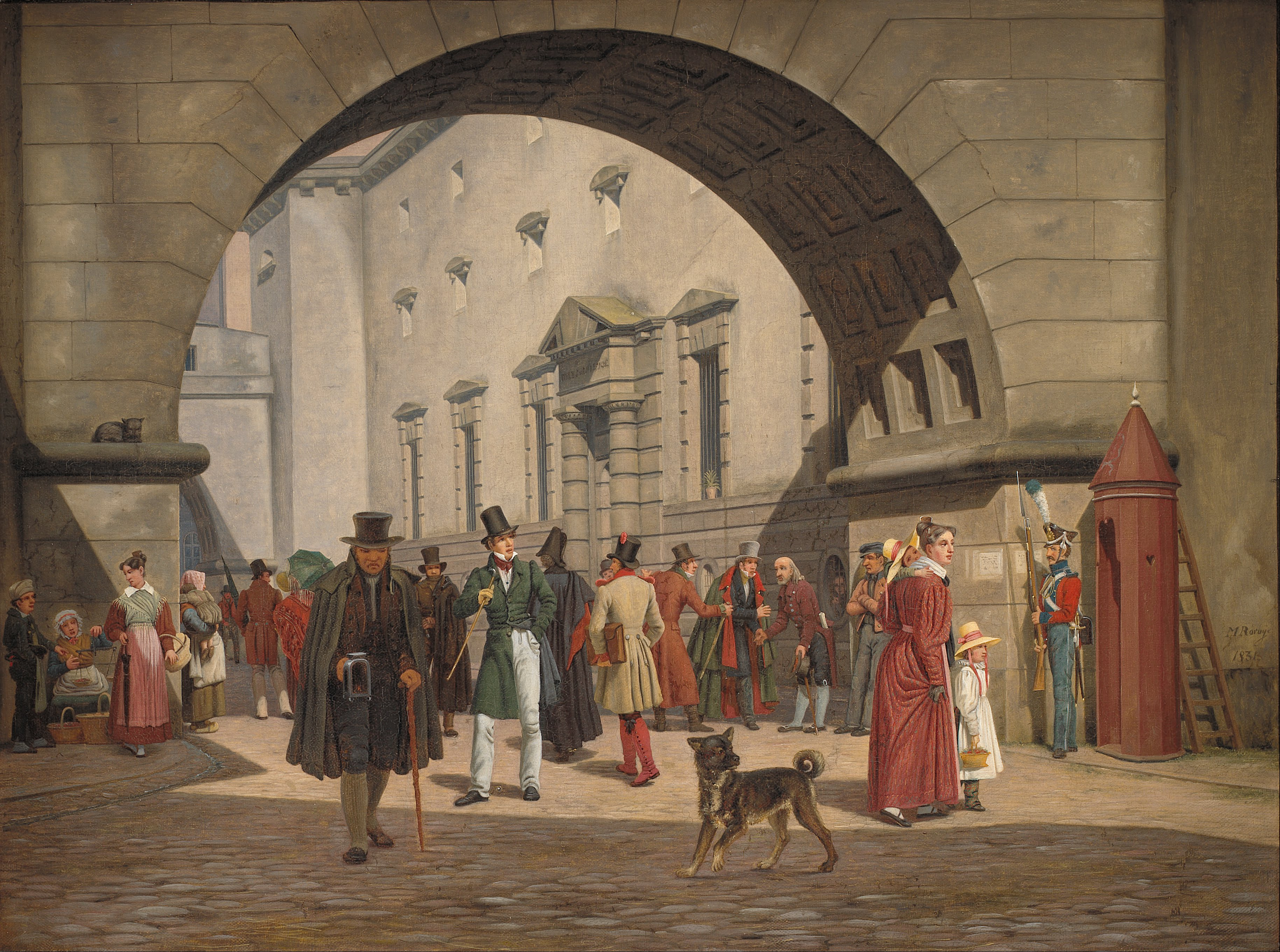
Arrestbygningen ved råd- og domhuset, 1831

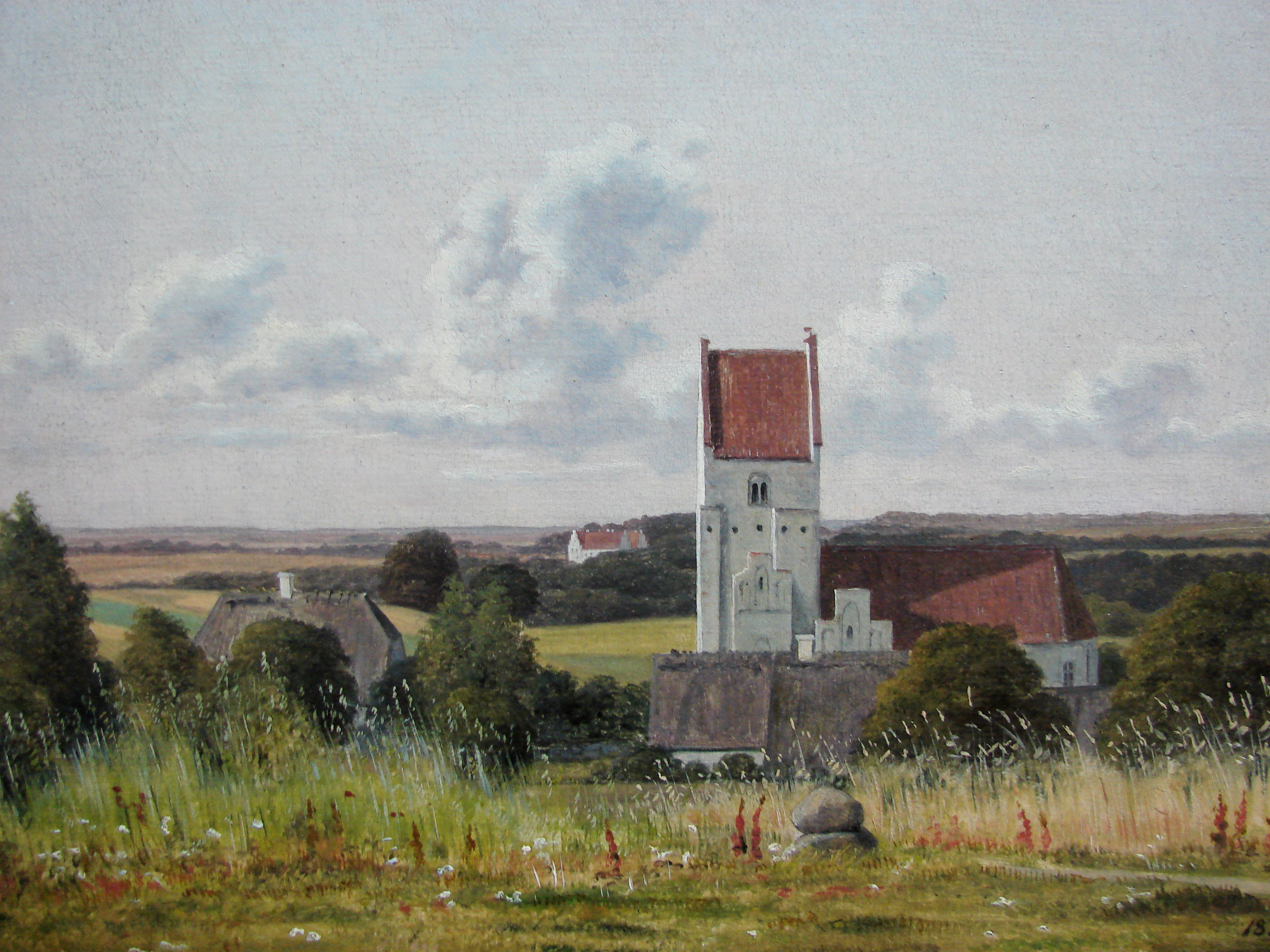
Vester Egede church, 1832

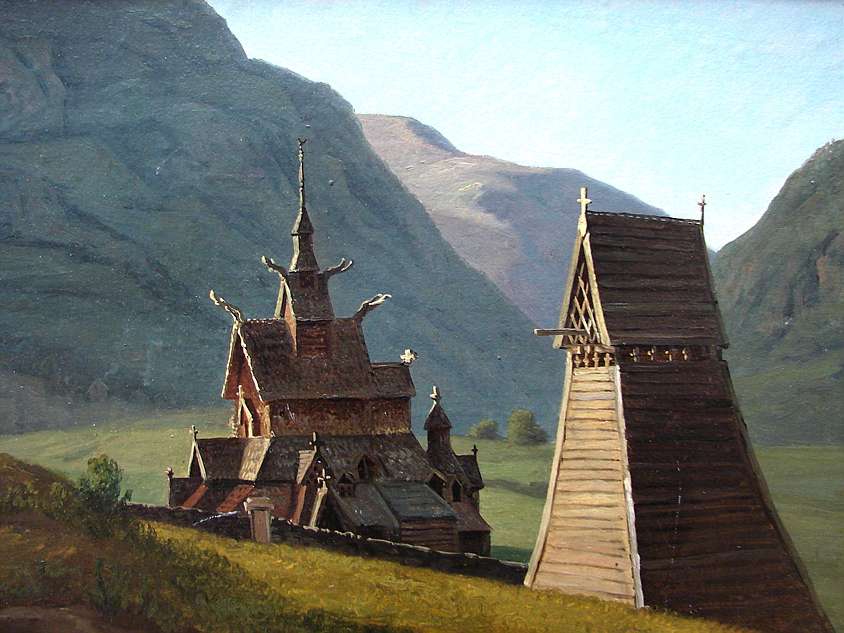
Stavkirken Borgund, 1833

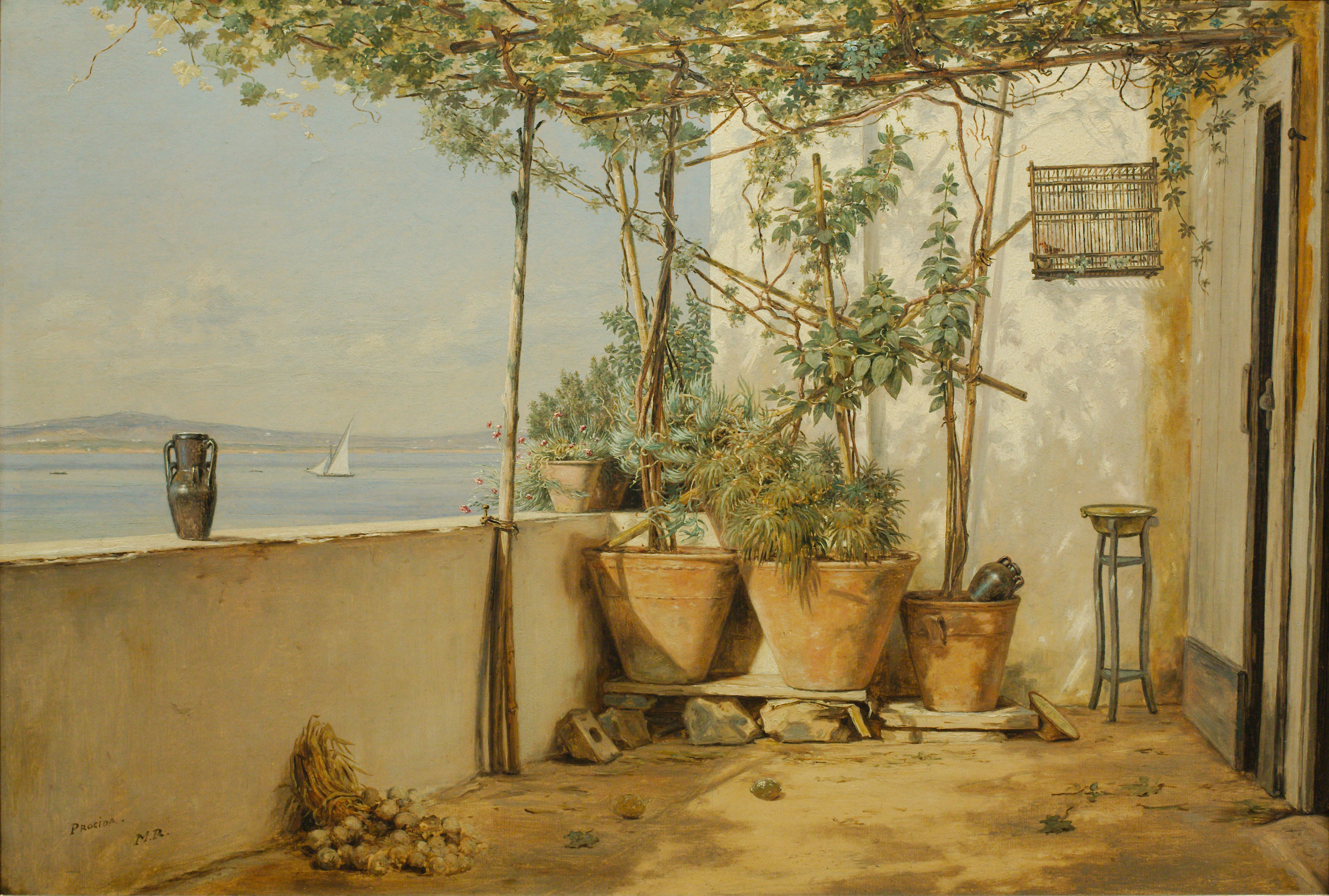
A loggia in Procida, between 1834 and 1841

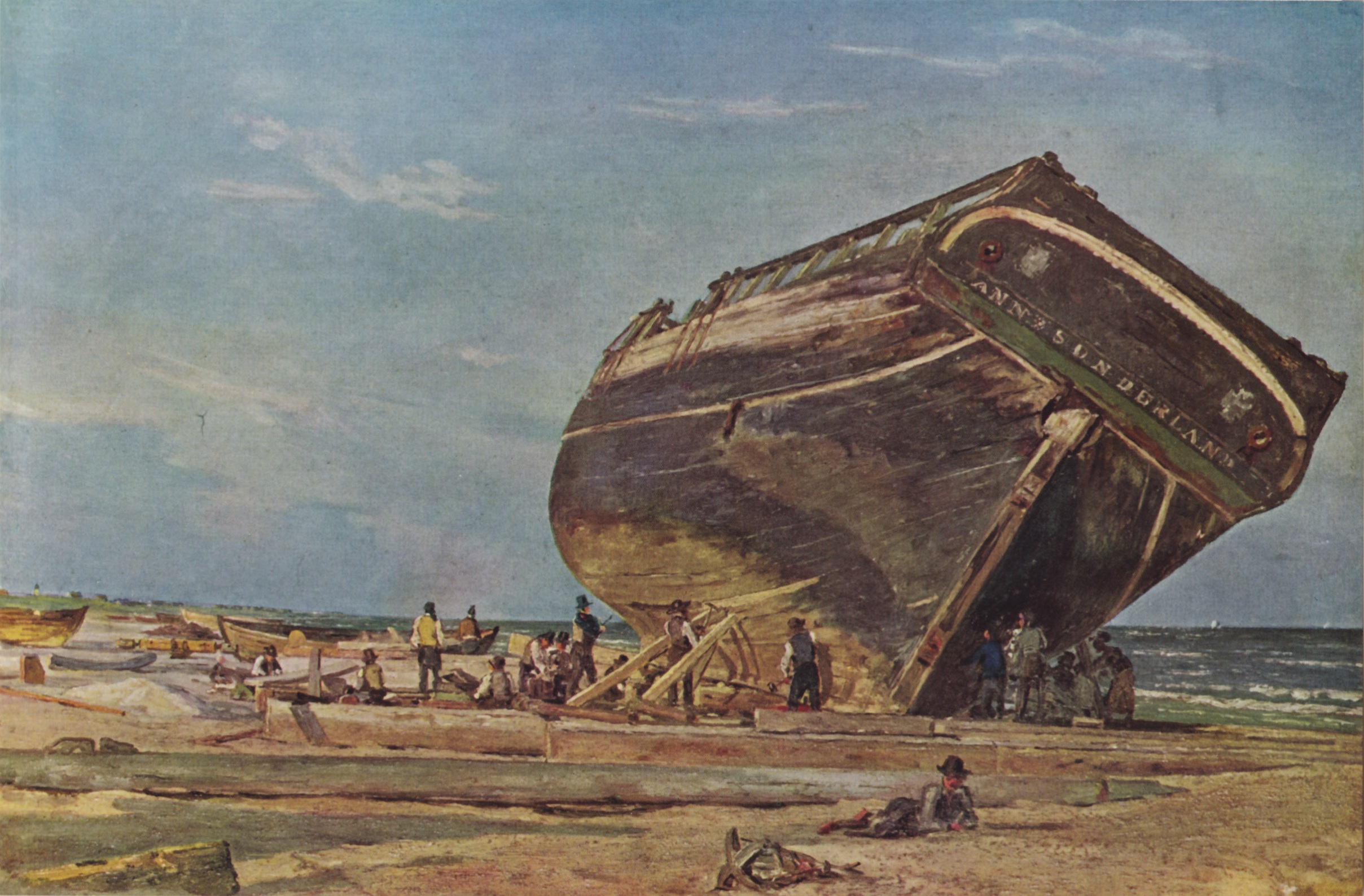
A Large Ship Under Caulking at Frederikshavn

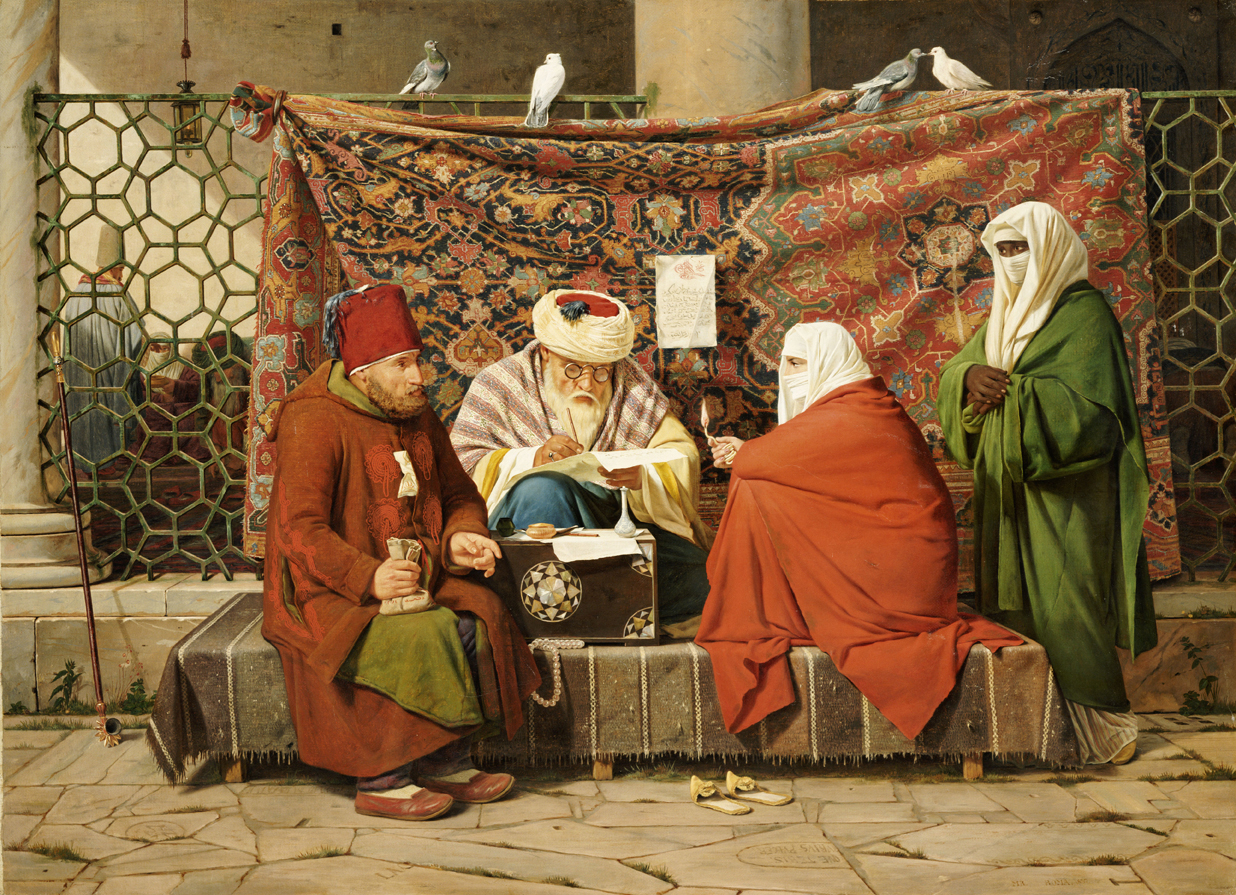
A Turkish notary drawing up a marriage contract the painting for which Rørbye won the Thorvaldsen Medal, 1837

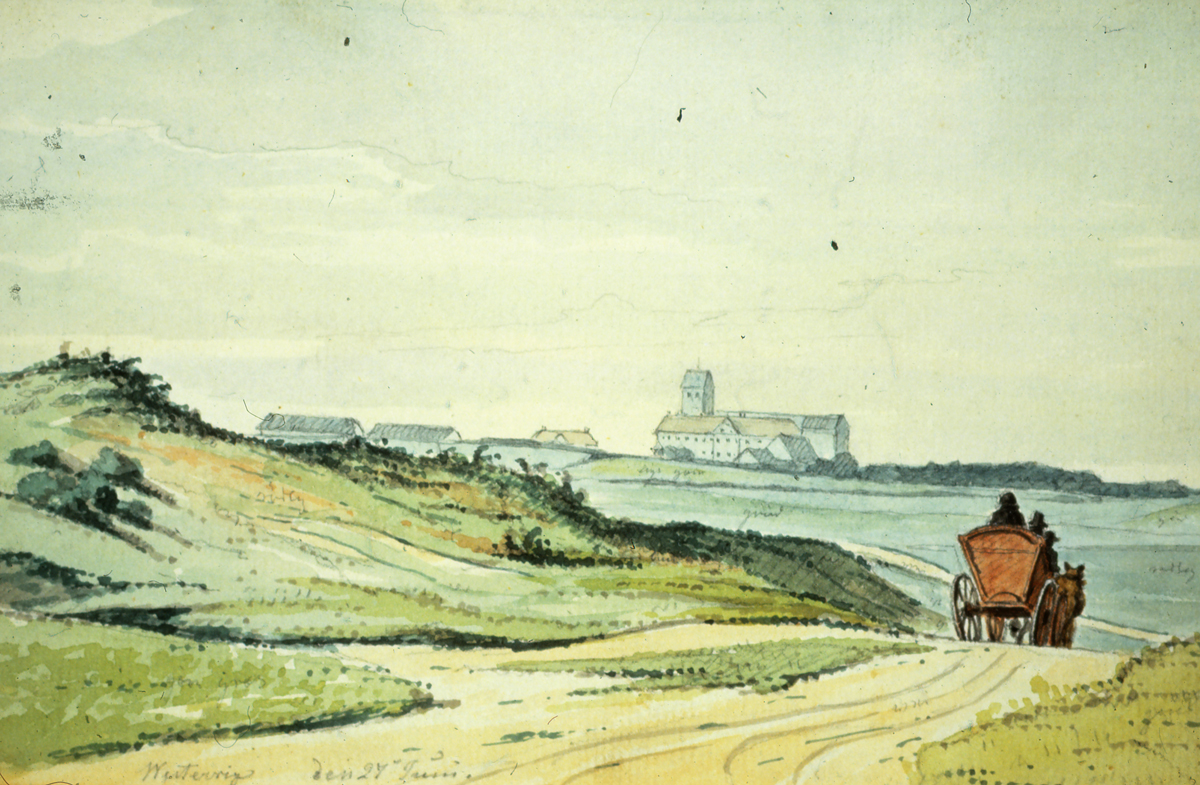
A horse carriage on the road, c. 1840

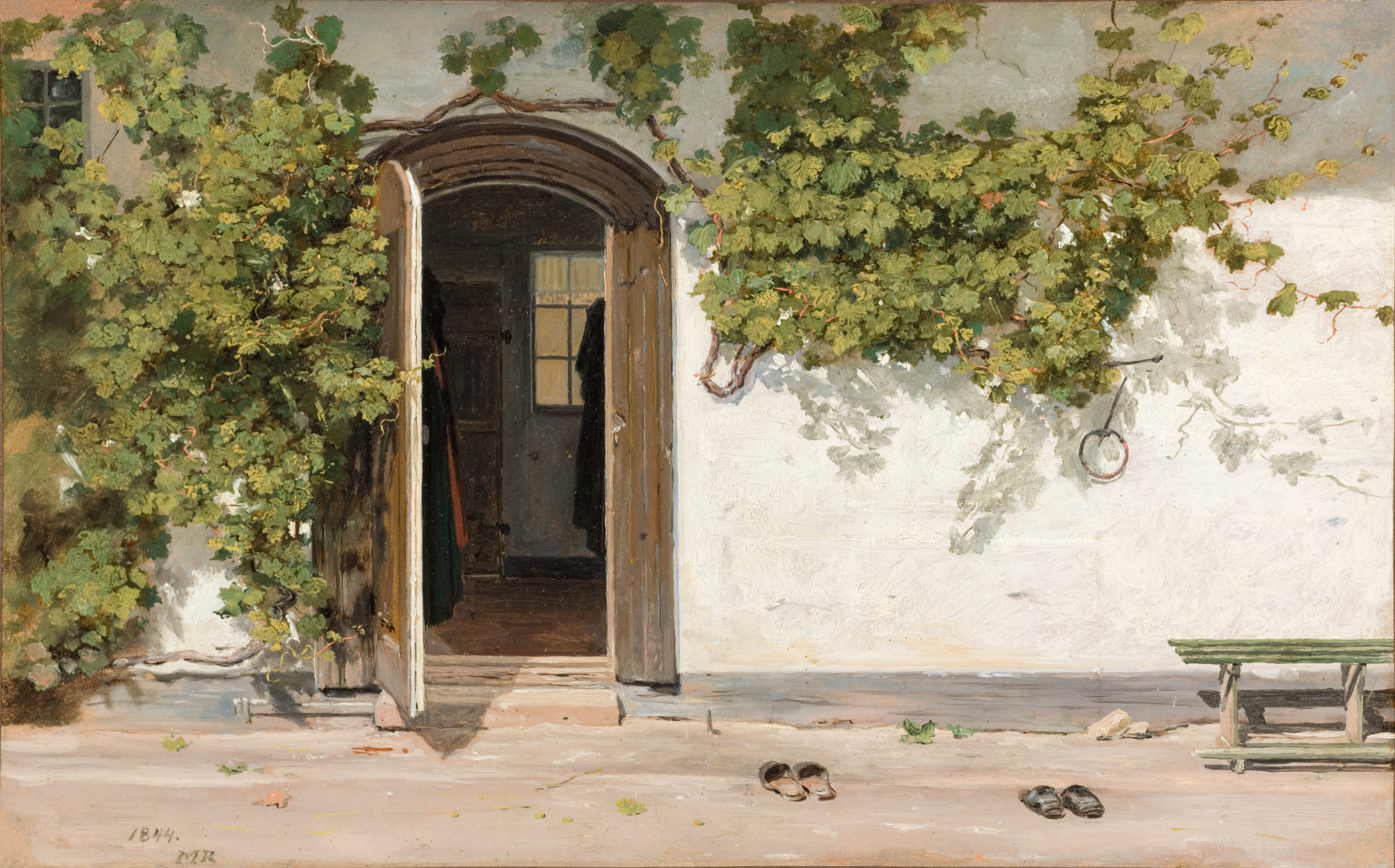
Ingangen til præstegården ved Hillested, 1844

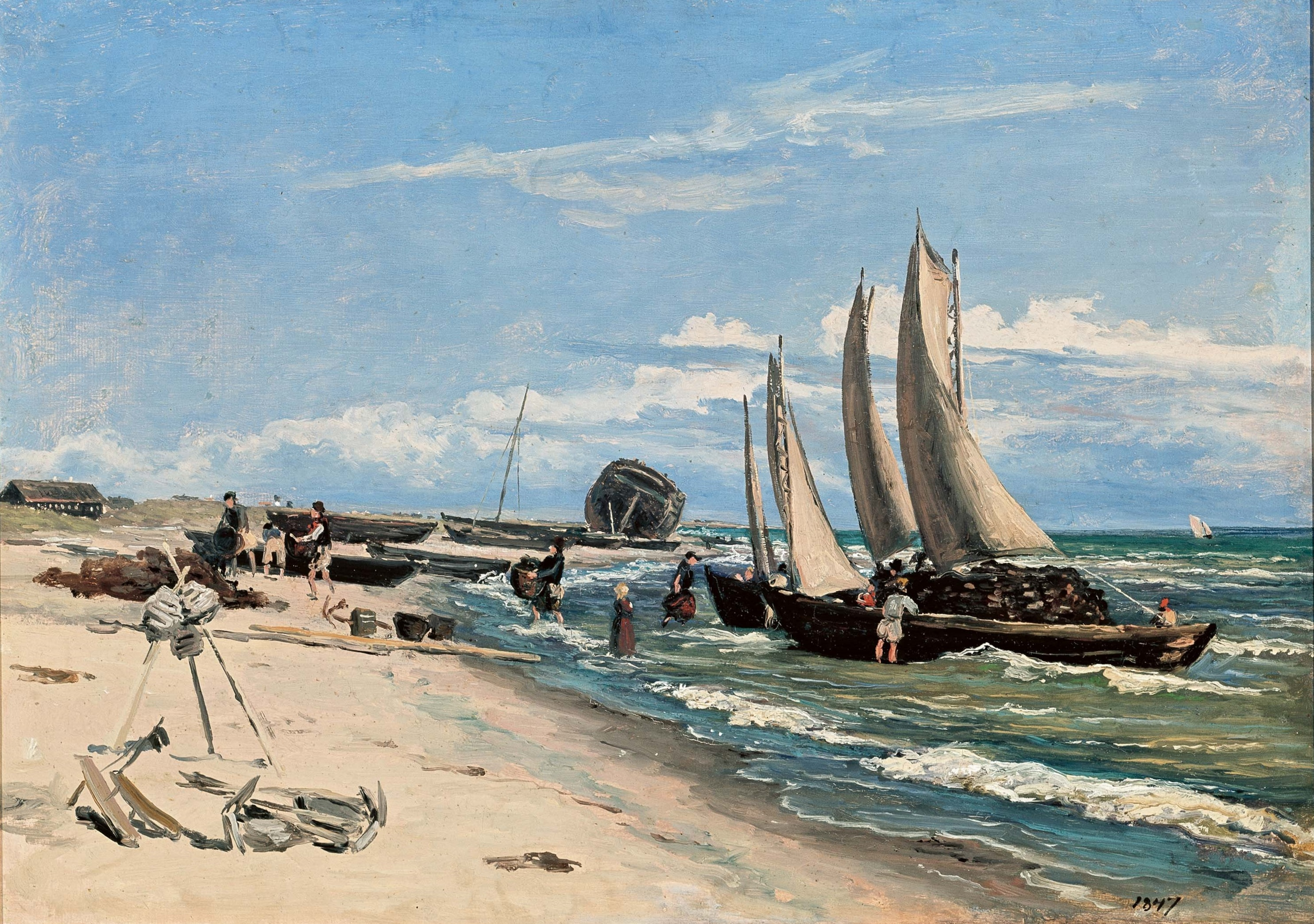
Stranden ved Skagen Vesterby, 1847

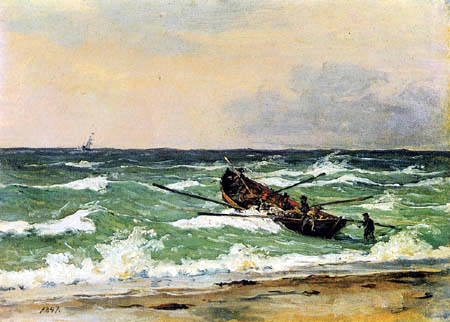
Fishermen returning from the sea, 1847

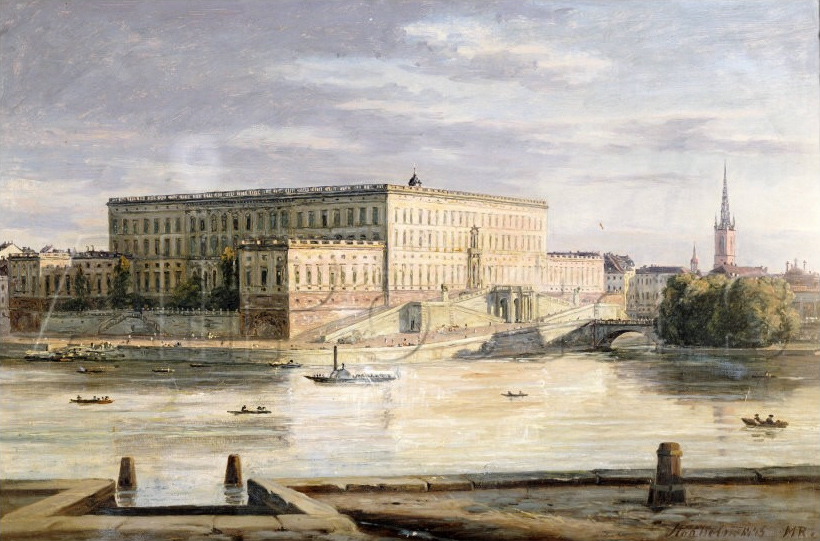
Stockholm Palace, 1848

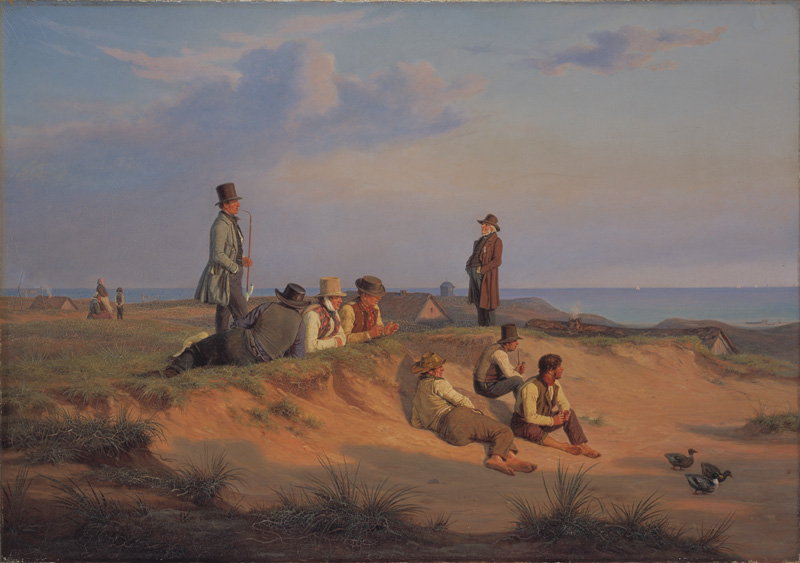
Men of Skagen on a summer evening in fair weather, one of Rørbye's last paintings, painted in Skagen in 1848

== See also ==
- List of Danish painters
- Art of Denmark
