= Georg Wolff (merchant) =

Georg Wolff (1736–1828) was a Norwegian-born merchant who served as the Danish Consul to Great Britain from 1787 to 1804.

== Biography ==
In 1759 Georg Wolff moved to London and worked as an assistant for Jens Pedersen, the owner of a timber export business. The company was part of a small Danish-Norwegian community centered on Wellclose Square in London. Most residents were involved in the export of Norwegian timber to London, a trade following the Great Fire of London in 1666.

In 1760 Wolff married Elizabeth Gorham, an 18-year-old woman from the English parish of St Neots. They had two daughters, Elizabeth (who married John Dorville but later became the mistress of George Montagu) and Martha Ann, as well as one son, Jens. In June 1770 the elder Elizabeth died. Wolff later married Sarah Cheesement, who bore him two additional daughters, Sarah Augusta, and Inger Maria. Following Sarah's death in 1790, Wolff never remarried.

In 1767 Georg was joined in London by his brother, Ernst Wolff. Together they established Geo. & Ernst Wolff. In 1792 Georg Wolff's son-in-law John Dorville became a partner and the firm name was changed to Wolffs & Dorville. The firm of Wolffs & Dorville flourished until it went bankrupt in 1812 largely due to the English Wars.

In 1787 Wolff was appointed the Danish Consul in London. The Danish consulate in London was responsible for Danish-Norwegian interests throughout the southern coasts of England, the Channel Islands, and the Isle of Man. All Danish-Norwegian ships arriving in London were required to report information concerning their cargo and journey to the consulate, placing Georg Wolff and his firm at the center of the northern timber trade.

Upon Britain's entry into the War of the First Coalition in 1793, the Royal Navy began taking Dano-Norwegian ships as prizes. In 1804, Georg Wolff's son, Jens Wolff was appointed Adjunct Consul and spent most of his time assisting Dano-Norwegian captains whose ships had been captured. Though few timber shipments from Norway were taken as prizes of war, in total nearly 1,000 Dano-Norwegian ships were seized between 1793 and 1807. Jens Wolff served as acting consul until the closing of the consulate in 1807 following the Bombardment of Copenhagen.

Wolff died in 1828. He and his wife Elizabeth were buried at the Danish Church in Wellclose Square.

== Other sources ==
- Polak, Ada (1968). Wolffs & Dorville: Et norsk-engelsk handelshus i London under Napoleonskrigene. (Oslo: Universitetsforlaget).
