= Bethlehem Church, Copenhagen =

Bethlehem Church
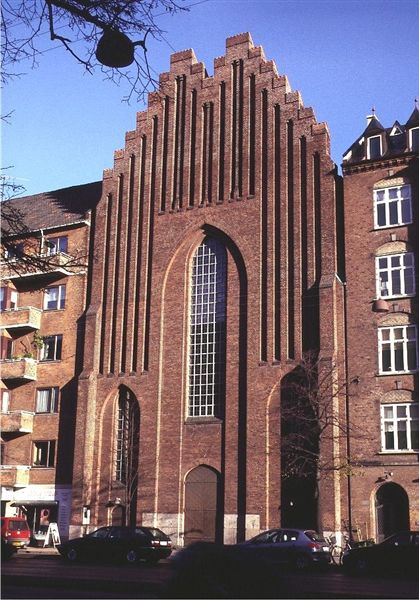
- The facade on Åboulevard
- Bethlehem Church
- 55°40′59.3″N 12°33′24.7″E
- Location: 8 Åboulevard; Vesterbro, Copenhagen
- Country: Denmark
- Denomination: Church of Denmark

History
- Status: Church

Architecture
- Architect: Kaare Klint
- Architectural type: Church
- Groundbreaking: 1935
- Completed: 1937

Specifications
- Materials: Brick

Administration
- Diocese: Diocese of Copenhagen

Bethlehem Church (Danish: Bethlehemskirken) is a church in the Nørrebro district of Copenhagen, Denmark, located on Åboulevard, close to Peblinge Lake and the municipal border with Frederiksberg. Peder Vilhelm Jensen-Klint made the first sketches for the church but after his death it was completed by his son, Kaare Klint, and built from 1935 to 1937. Its style is remniscient of Grundtvig's Church, Jensen Klint's most famous work, which was also completed posthumously by Kaare Klint, although on a much smaller scale.

== History ==
Bethlehem Church is one of many churches in Copenhagen built by the Copenhagen Church Trust, founded in 1890 to collect money and build new churches in the rapidly growing Danish capital, and Peder Vilhelm Jensen-Klint was charged with the design. He had already designed Anna Church and the monumental Grundtvig's Church in Copenhagen as well as Gedser Church on the island og Falster and St. Hans Tveje' Church in Odense. Jensen-Klint also designed a congregation house close by which was completed in 1931.

After Jensen-Klint's death on 1 December 1930, Kaare Klint, his son, completed the design process based on his father's initial sketches. The church was built from 1935 to 1937 and consecrated on 13 February 1938 by the Bishop of Copenhagen.

== Architecture ==
The church building is integrated in the row of houses and the facade toward the street is built in red brick. Its style is strongly remniscient of Jensen Klint's other churches with elements from Gothic Revival architecture and Brick Expressionism.

== Interior ==
The three nave church room is relatively short and therefore appears strikingly high. All inside walls are clad in yellow brickwork.

== Furnishings ==
Kaare Klint designed all furnishings and fittings. All but the font are executed in light-coloured timber with a minimum of detail. The ciborium above the altar is inspired by the altar in the Church of the Nativity in Bethlehem. The canopy over the pulpit is decorated with a Star of David.

The church is the first church in Denmark to use individual chairs instead of benches. Designed specifically for the church, the chair later won great popularity, both for use in other churches and when it became commercially available for private homes.

== See also ==
- Architecture of Denmark
