= Anna Church, Copenhagen =

Anna Church
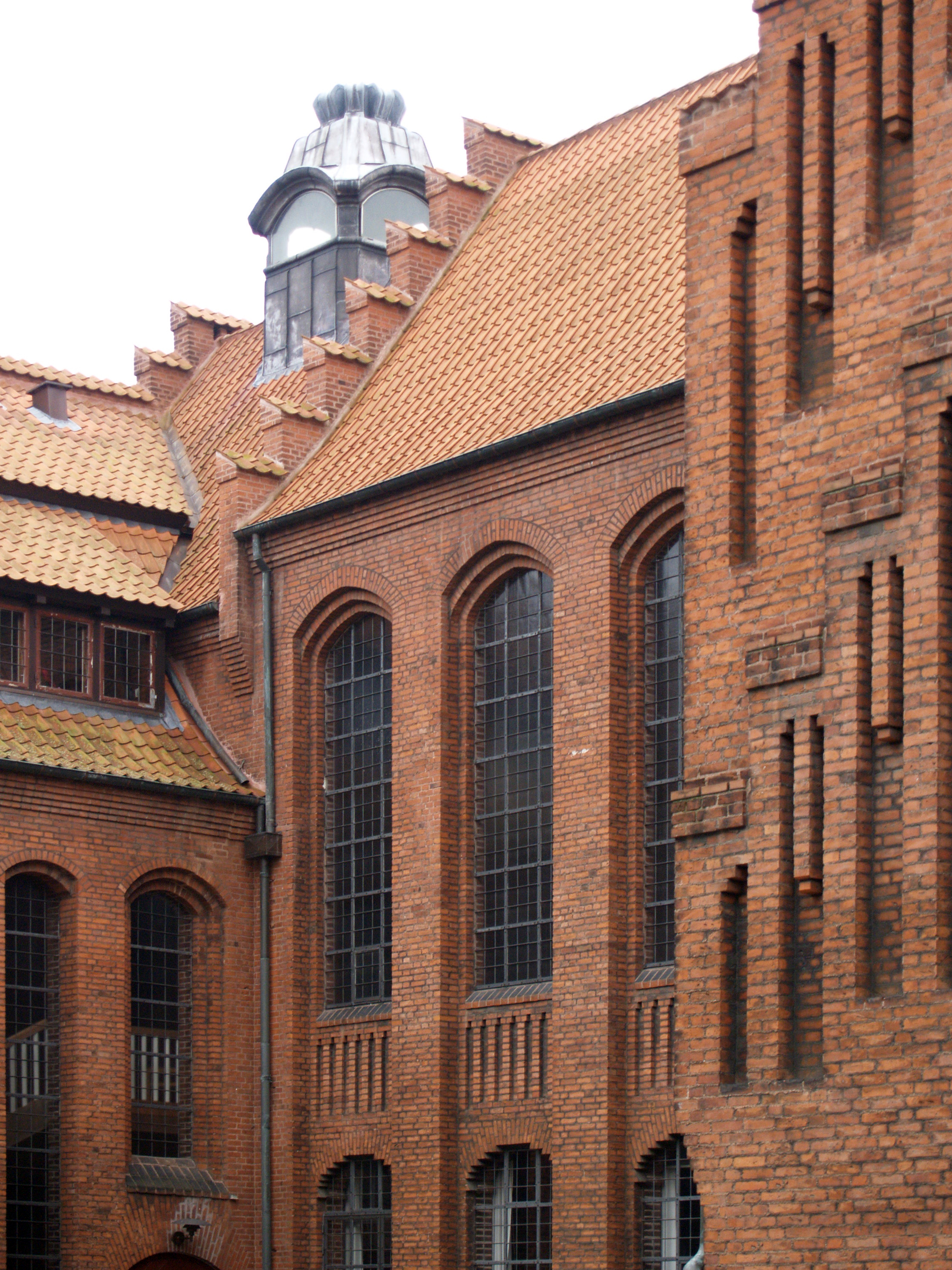
- Anna Church
- Anna Church
- 55°41′34.8″N 12°32′38.9″E
- Location: Nørrebro, Copenhagen
- Country: Denmark
- Denomination: Church of Denmark

History
- Status: Church

Architecture
- Architect: Peder Vilhelm Jensen-Klint
- Architectural type: Church
- Completed: 1914, 1921, 1928

Specifications
- Materials: Brick

Administration
- Archdiocese: Diocese of Copenhagen

Anna Church (Danish: Anna Kirke) is a Lutheran church in the Nørrebro district of Copenhagen, Denmark. It was designed by Peder Vilhelm Jensen-Klint, best known for his design of Grundtvig's Church, also in Copenhagen. Built in three stages, it was completed between 1914 and 1928.

== History ==
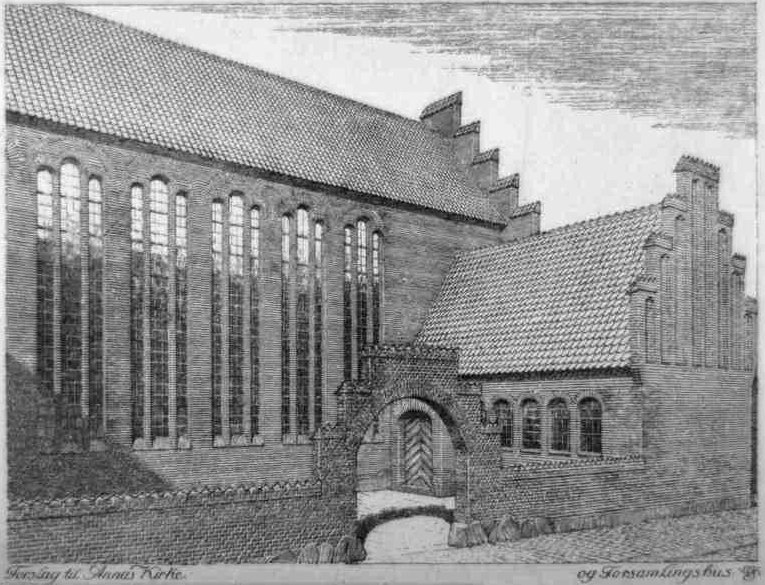
Early draft, differing from the final design in several ways including a lower lateral wing

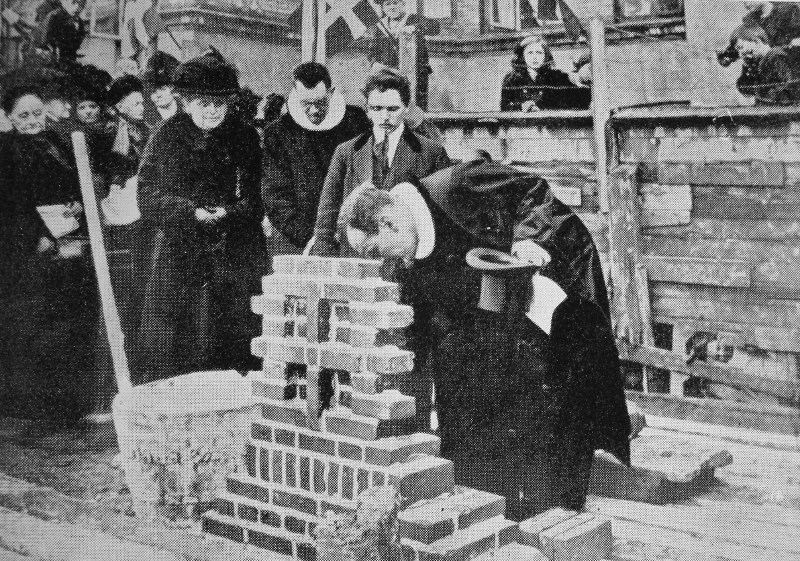
Foundation stone ceremony

At the turn of the 20th century the population grew rapidly in Copenhagen and the city authorities decided to employ an assistant pastor to work in the southern part of St. Stephen's Parish, one of the poorest working-class neighbourhoods of the city, until it could be disjoined as an independent parish. In 1907 the Copenhagen Church Trust acquired a cheap plot of land but it proved difficult to raise funds for the building of a church in the poor community. An Anna Committee was therefore set up, consisting of women named Anna from throughout the country, which endorsed everybody named Anna to donate DKK 1 for the project.

Peder Vilhelm Jensen-Klint was commissioned to make a design in 1911 and it was built from 1913 to 1914. The church is named after Anna the Prophetess who appears in the passage from the Gospel about the Presentation of Jesus at the Temple which was read at the opening on 27 December 1914.

After some years the church had become too small and Jensen-Klint was asked to design an extension. Once again the Anna Committee raised the necessary funds. This extension added a parish hall in a lateral which had a gable toward the street. The last extension was carried out from 1924 to 1928 and added a second lateral wing at the other end of the nave.

== Architecture ==
The church consists of three wings built in red brick. The two lateral wings have stepped gables facing the street and flank a U-shaped space in front of the main wing. The roof is of red tiles and has two flèches with the bells. The brickwork is an exemplar of Jensen Klint's style.

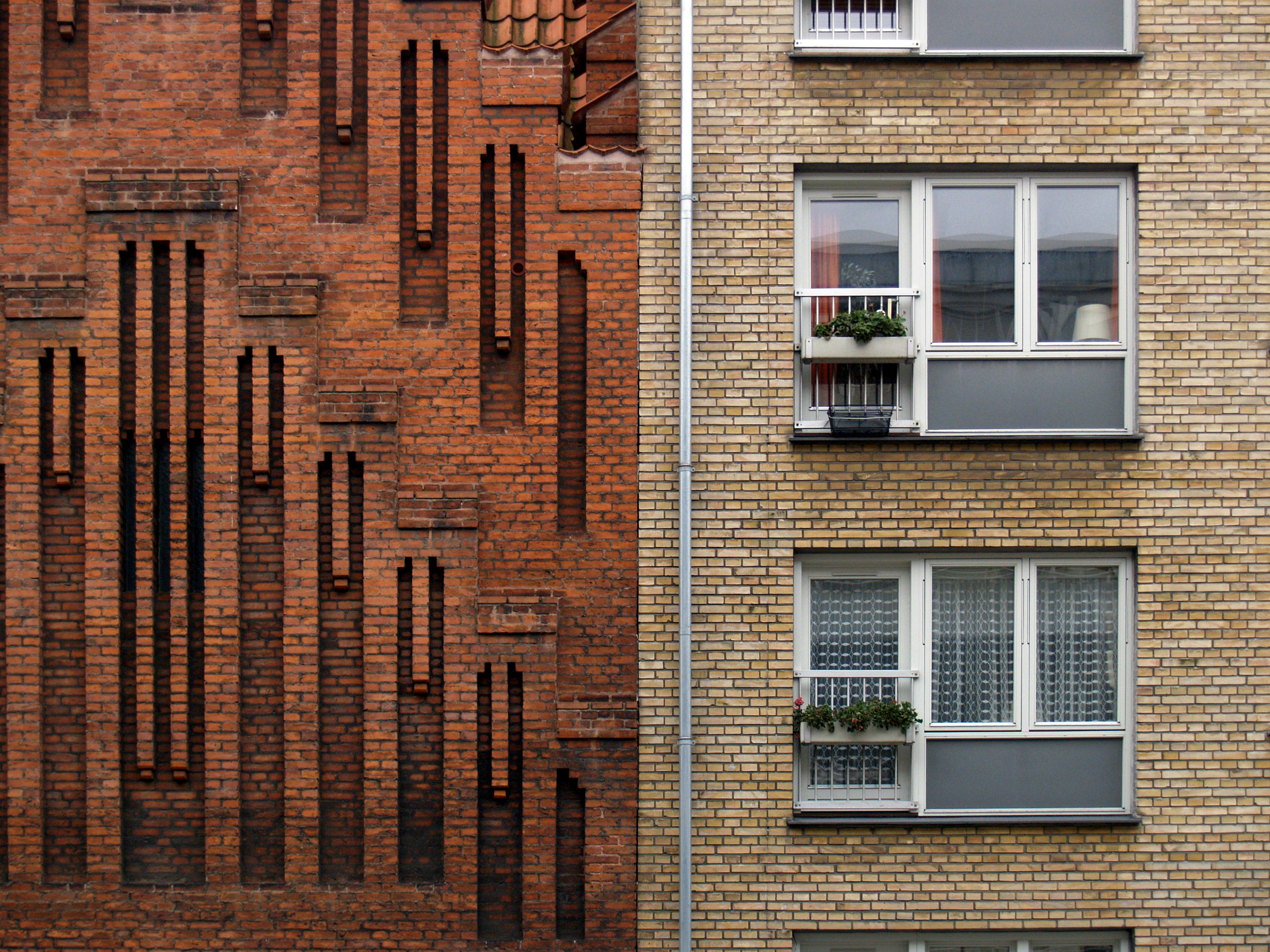
Facade detail showing Jensen-Klint's characteristic brickwork next to the facade of the neighbouring building

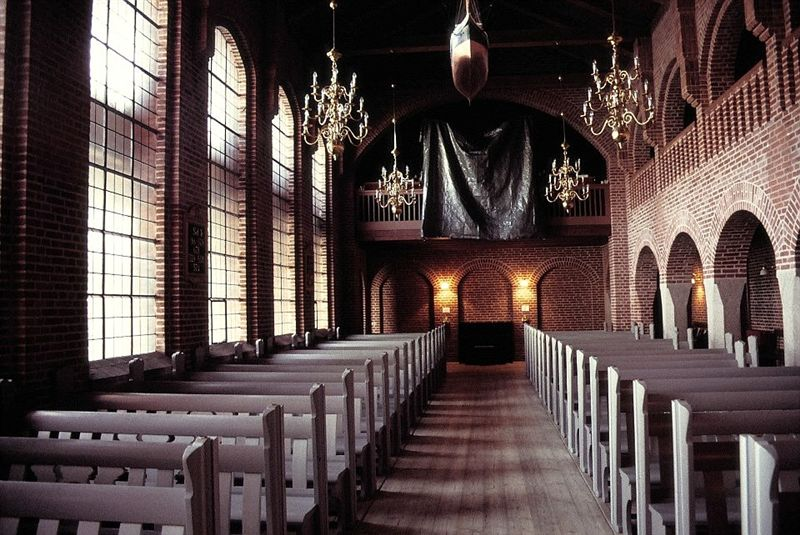
The nave, view toward south-east

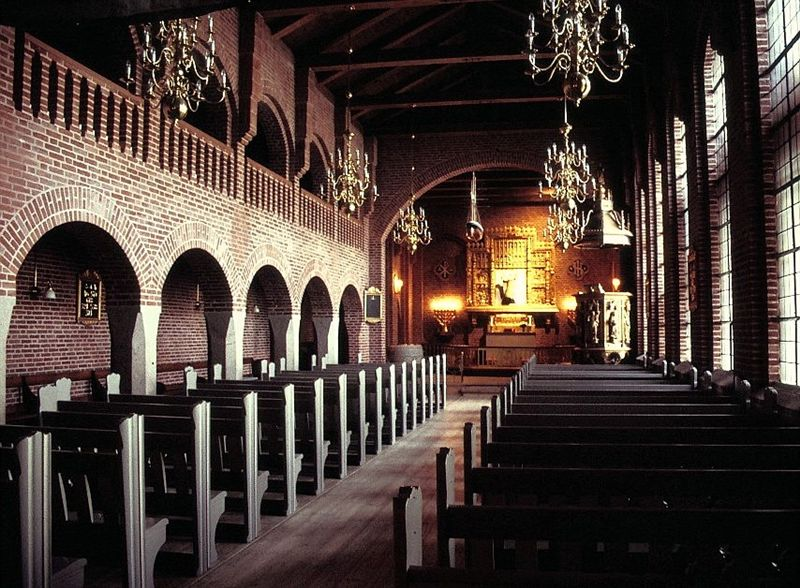
The nave, view toward north-west

== See also ==
- Gedser Church
