= Trianglen Waiting Hall =

Listed building in Copenhagen, Denmark

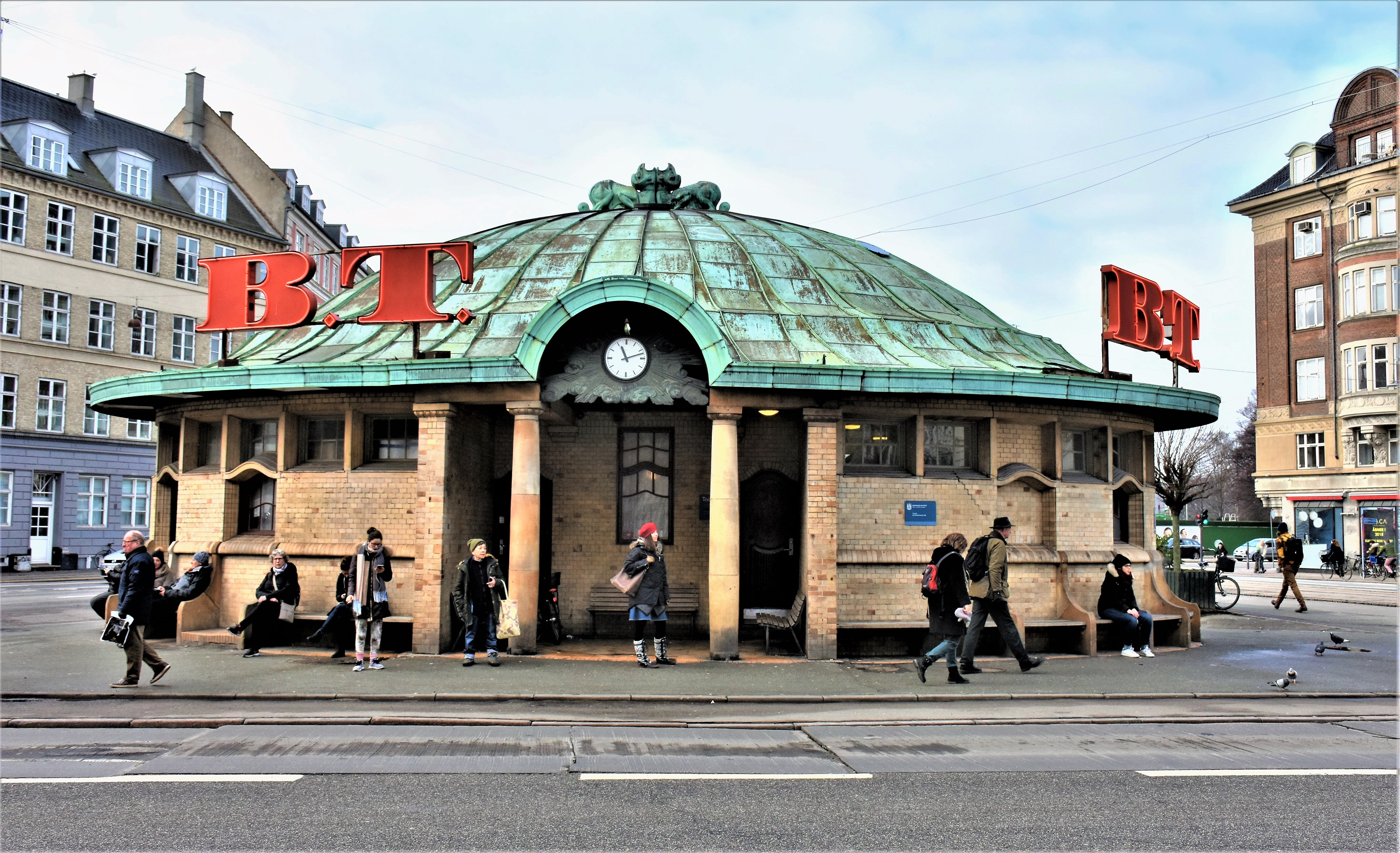
- Interactive map of the Trianglen Waiting Hall area

General information
- Architectural style: Art Nouveau
- Location: Copenhagen, Denmark
- Coordinates: 55°41′57.3″N 12°34′38.9″E
- Completed: 1751
- Renovated: 1907

Design and construction
- Architect: Peder Vilhelm Jensen-Klint

Trianglen Waiting Hall, also known as The Bee (Danish: Bien), or more rarely as the Soup Bowl (Danish: Suppeterrinen)) or The Turtle (Danish: Skildpadden), as a reference to the plump shape of the building, is a former tramway waiting hall on Trianglen in the Østerbro district of Copenhagen, Denmark. The Art Nouveau style building was constructed in 1907 to designs by Peder Vilhelm Jensen-Klint in collaboration with his employee Povl Baumann.

== History ==
The architect Peder Vilhelm Jensen-Klint was charged with designing the building in 1904. It is not known why Jensen-Klint—a young architect who had recently completed Gotved Gymnasium but had little other experience—was selected for the assignment, but another waiting hall, on City Hall Square, designed by the city architect, had been subject to heavy criticism for its design. Østerbro Landowners Association (Østerbro Grundejerforening) had preferred an underground solution, stating that a building of that size would completely dominate the square. Jensen-Klint had to create five different design proposals before the association was satisfied with the design. Jensen-Klint's employee Povl Baumann influenced the final design of the building.

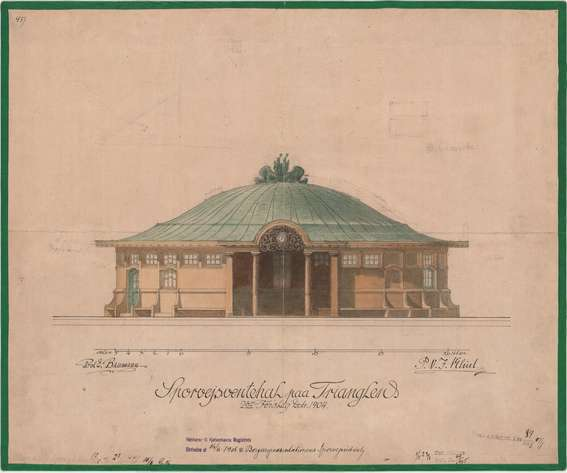
Rendering

During the negotiations in Copenhagen City Council, in 1904, its chairman, Emil Slomann, who found the building's exterior interesting but expected some controversy about it, observed "it will probably be called a tureen lid by some people [...] but a tureen lid can also be beautiful".

The design was finally approved in 1907. The Association for the Beautification of the Capital (Foreningen til Hovedstadens Forskønnelse) was consulted on the matter and approved of the project.

The building was later operated as a kiosk under the name "The Bee" (Danish: Bien), possibly as a reference to an existing colloquial. The name of the kiosk was probably instrumental in giving the name "The Bee" a quasi-official status as the name of the building even after it closed.

The building was listed in the Danish registry of protected buildings and places on 11 February 1986.

== Gallery ==
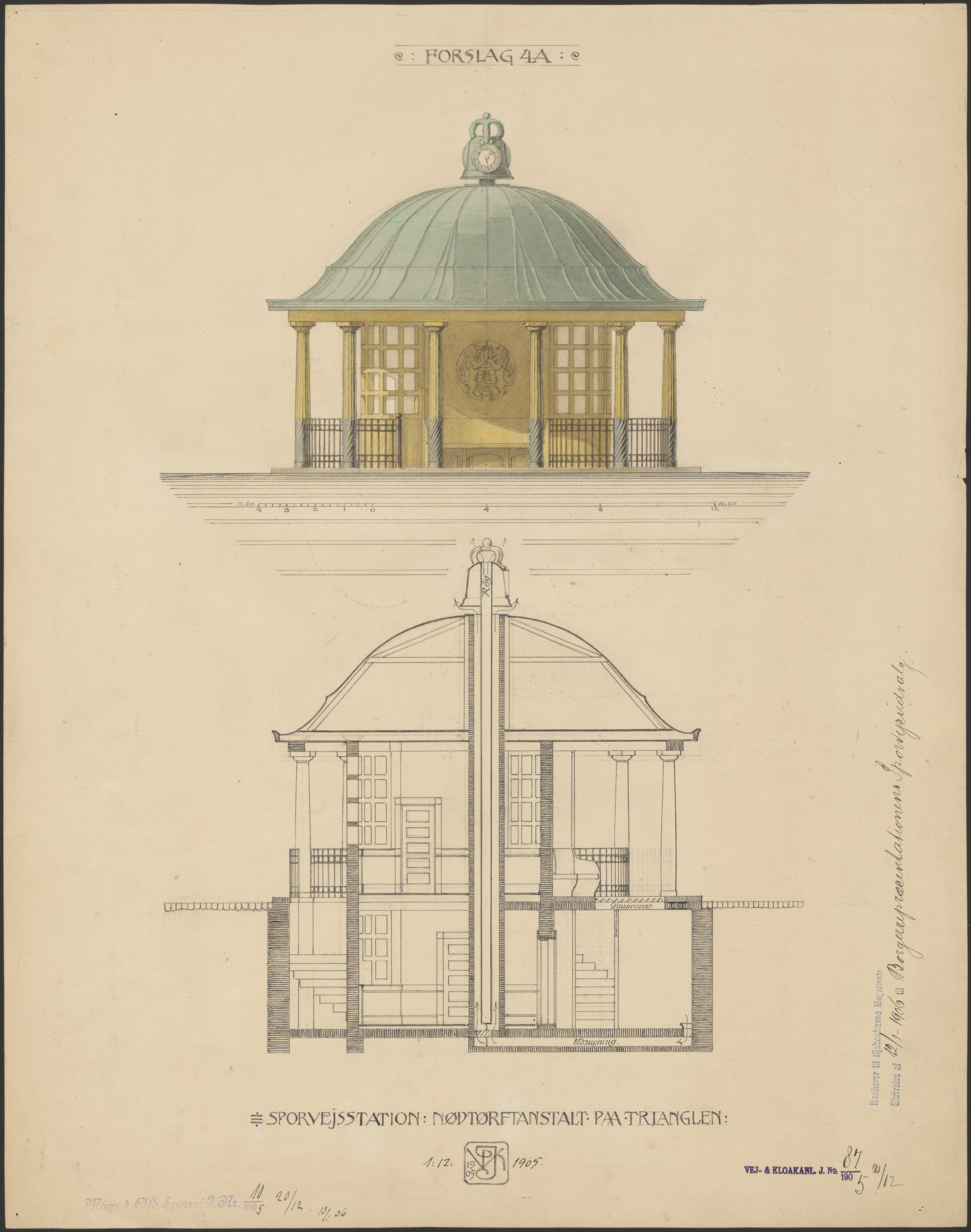
Jensen-Klint proposal

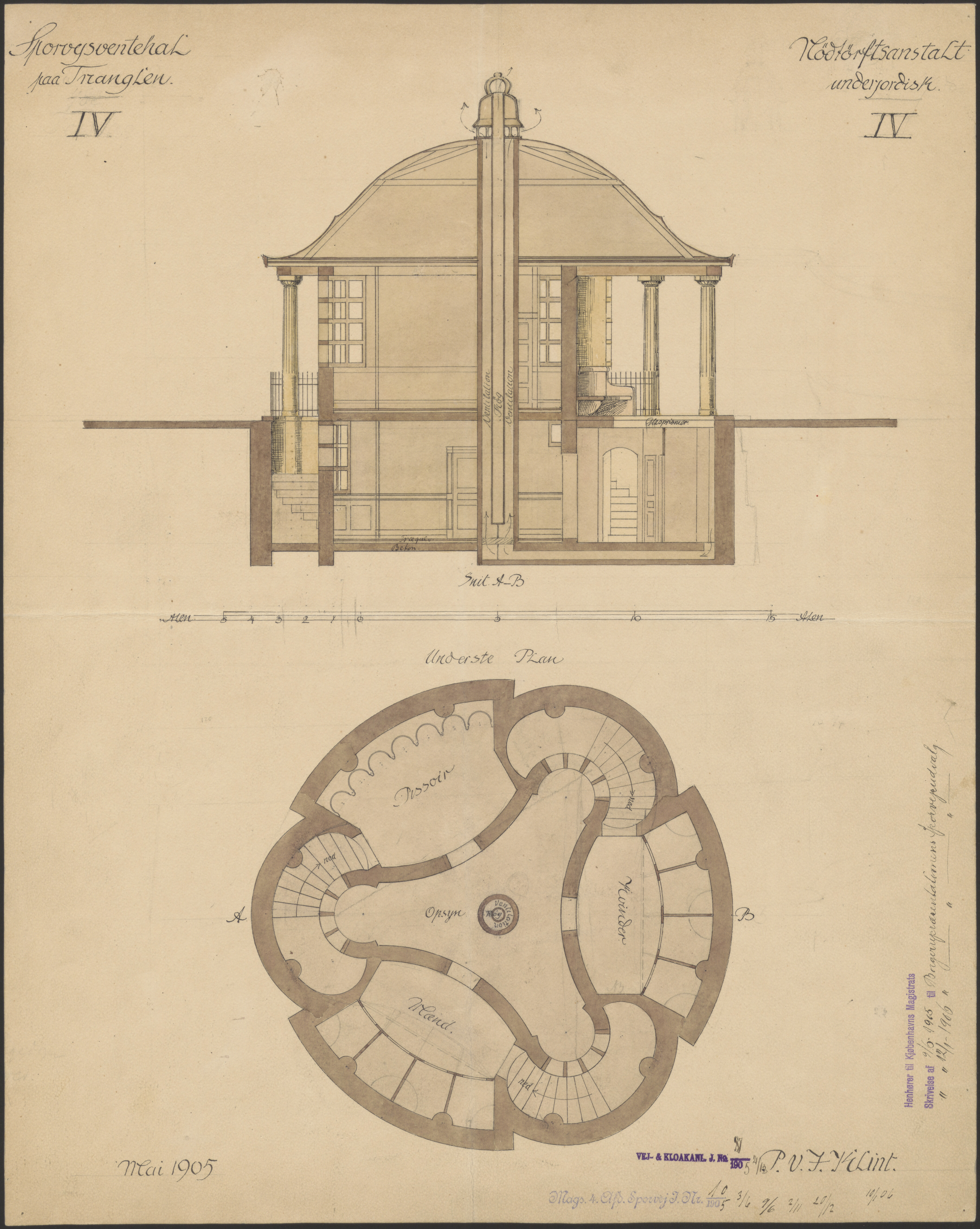
Jensen-Klint proposal

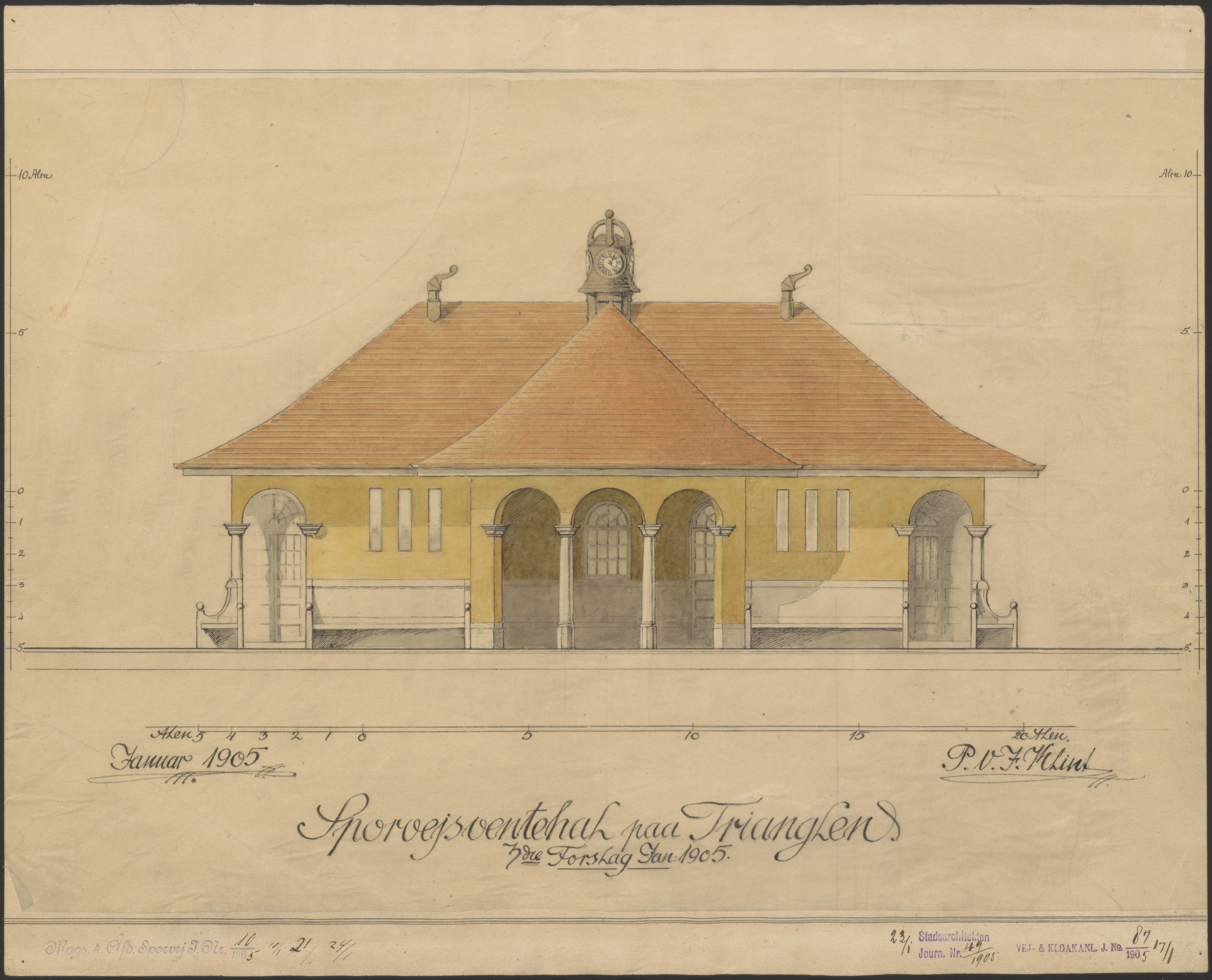
Jensen-Klint proposal

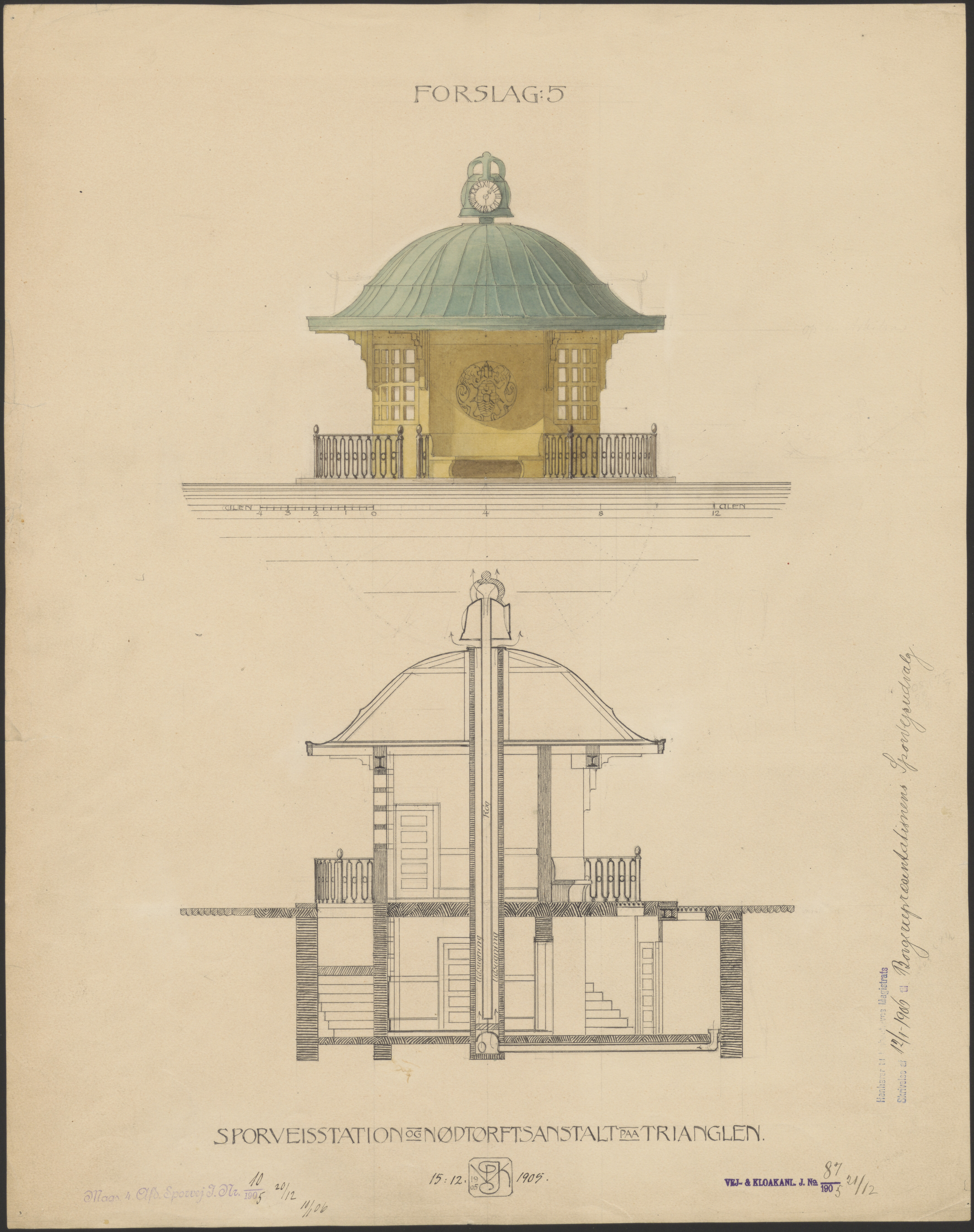
Jensen-Klint proposal

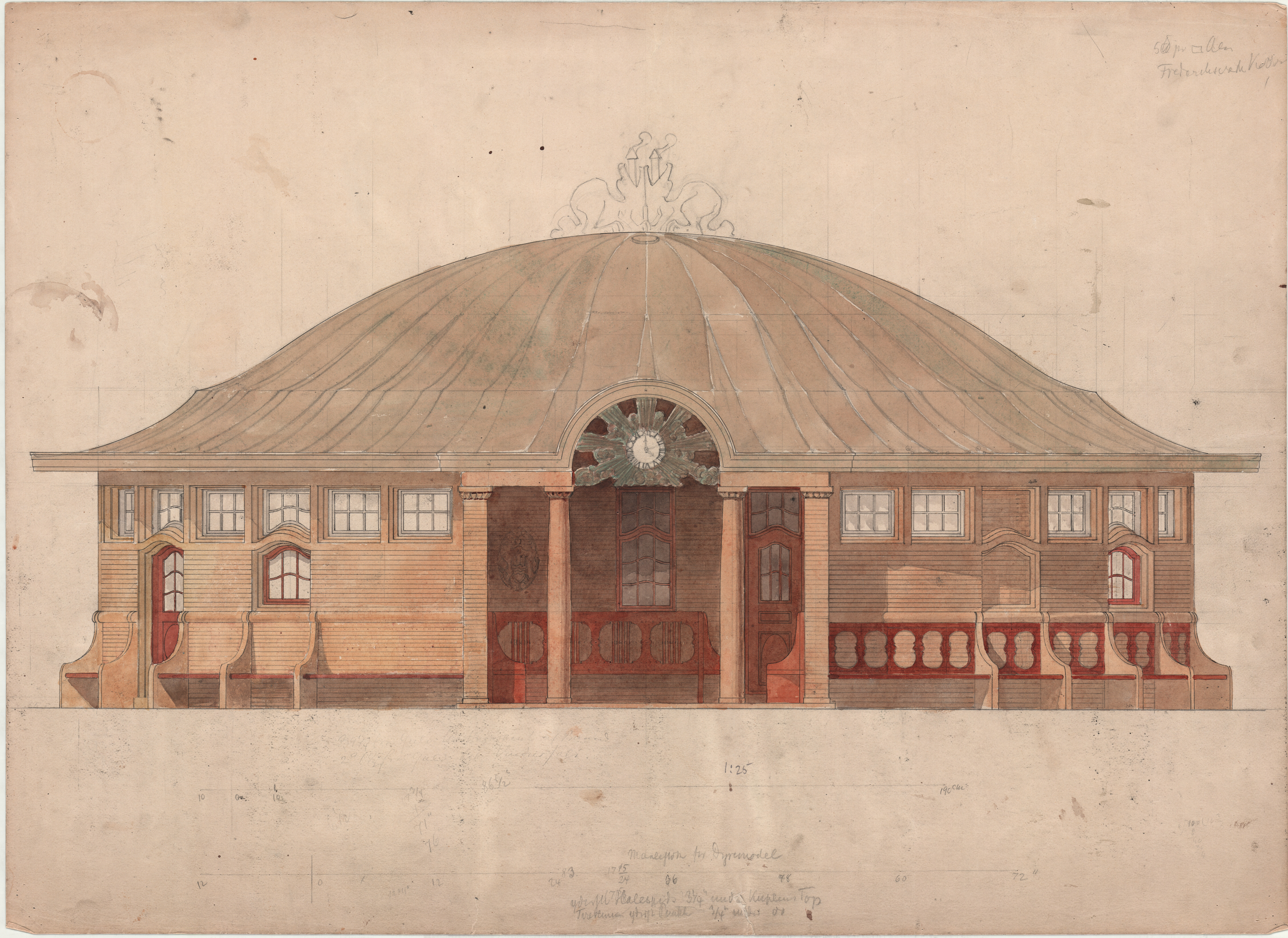
Jensen-Læint proposal
