= Peder Vilhelm Jensen-Klint =

Danish architect, designer, painter and architectural theorist

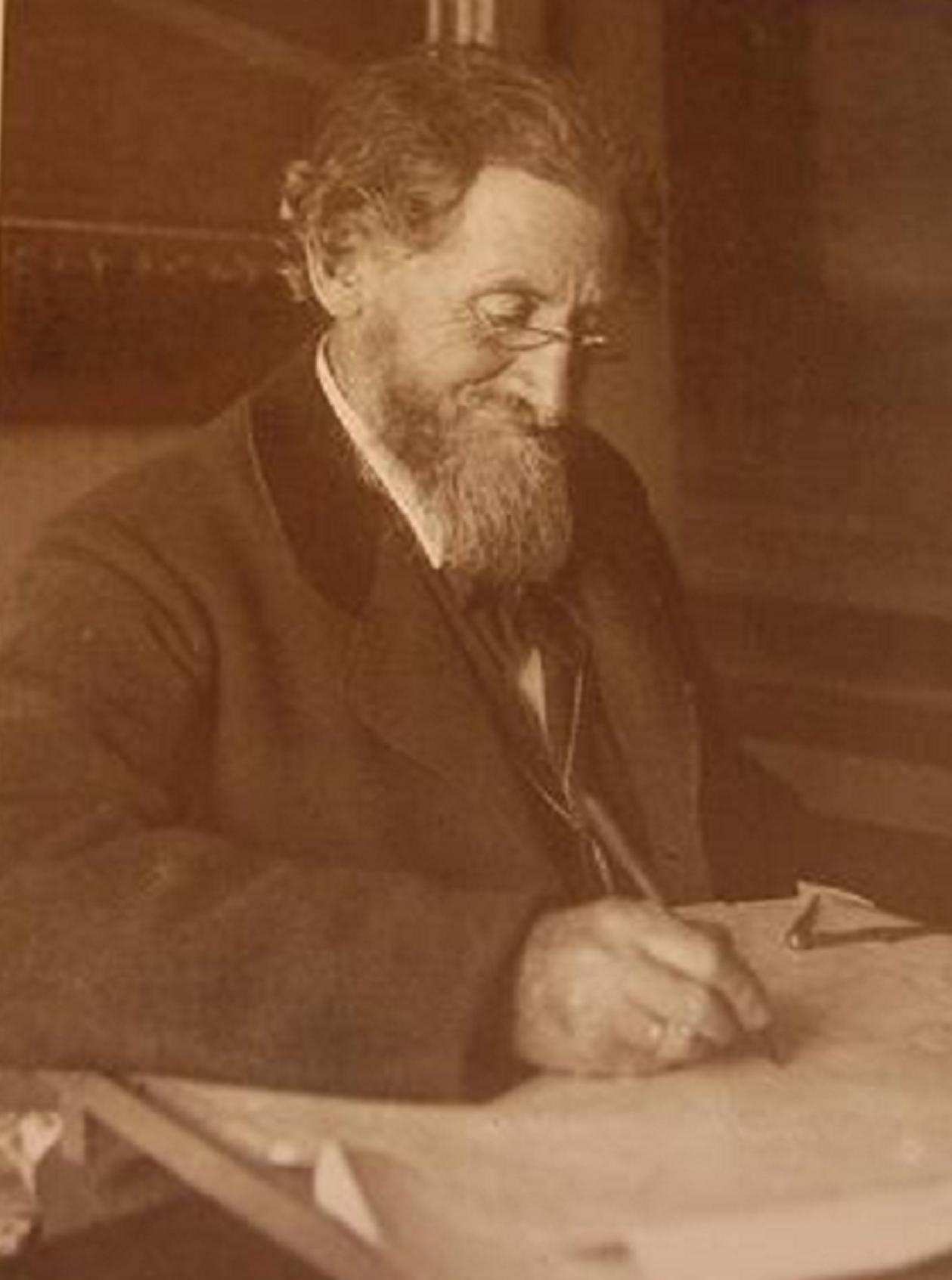
- Peder Vilhelm Jensen-Klint at his desk
- Born: 21 June 1853; Mineslyst ved Holsteinborg, Denmark
- Died: 1 December 1930 (aged 77); Copenhagen, Denmark
- Occupation: Architect
- Awards: C. F. Hansen Medal (1924)
- Buildings: Grundtvig's Church; Gedser Church; Anna Church, Copenhagen

Peder Vilhelm Jensen-Klint (21 June 1853 – 1 December 1930) was a Danish architect, designer, painter and architectural theorist, best known for designing Grundtvig's Church in Copenhagen, generally considered to be one of the most important Danish architectural works of the time. Its Expressionist style relies heavily on Scandinavian brick Gothic traditions.

Jensen-Klint was the father of fellow architect Kaare Klint who assumed responsibility for completing work on Grundtvig's Church after his father's death in 1930.

== Early life and career ==
Peder Vilhelm Jensen-Klint was born in 1853 as Peder Vilhelm Jensen but changed his name on 10 November 1890. He was admitted to the College of Advanced Technology in 1870 and graduated as a building engineer in 1877. One of his teachers was Johan Daniel Herholdt—who with his Copenhagen University Library started a trend with the use of red bricks for landmark buildings in Danish architecture—and he greatly influenced Jensen-Klint's understanding of materials and knowledge of early Danish architectural traditions. In May 1878, Jensen-Klint was admitted to the Royal Danish Academy of Fine Arts School of Painting where he took all the classes but never graduated. He wanted to pursue a career as an artist but had to teach mathematics to make a living. In the end he had to give up his aspirations to live as an artist and from 1889 to 1897 he worked as an assistant for the City Engineer in Copenhagen and from 1892 to 1916 he also gave drawing classes at the Royal Veterinary and Agricultural University. In 1891 he travelled in Italy and in 1910 he visited England.

== Breakthrough as an architect ==
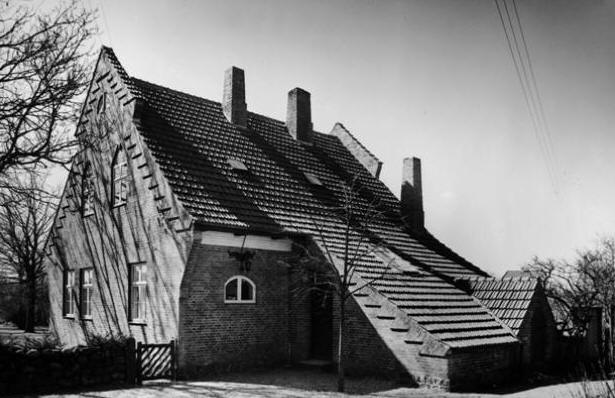
The Thorkild Aagaard House

Jensen-Klint became increasingly interested in architecture and his first architectural work was a villa in Hellerup designed for a good friend, the goldsmith W. Holm, after a small private competition also involving the architect Eugen Jørgensen. After that followed several more villas in the same area which all demonstrate various experiments with masonry in red brick. Following completion of the Gym House in Frederiksberg, he was admitted into the Architects' Association of Denmark in spite of his lack of formal training. His principal inspiration came from Danish manor houses, churches and stout, simple Baroque houses.

In 1907 he designed a house for the Danish composer Thorvald Aagaard in Ryslinge on the island of Funen and subsequently another house in Svendborg.

== Fine and decorative arts ==
=== Painting and sculptural work ===
As a painter, Jensen-Klint first concentrated on landscape painting until Carl Bloch replaced Jørgen Toed as professor at the academy. After he gave up his artistic career, he still painted occasionally but also started to show an interest in sculptural work. He participated in the competition for a new fountain for Amagertorv in Copenhagen which led to the Stork Fountain with an entry depicting a merry Amager peasant sitting on a cabbagehead (1890).

=== Ceramics ===
With inspiration from Joakim Skovgaard he also began working with ceramics and eventually other decorative works such as gravestones, bookbindings and particularly furniture.

== Selected buildings ==
- Villa for W. Holm (Sofievej 27), Hellerup (1896)
- Gotved Gymnasium, Vodroffsvej 49–51, Frederiksberg (1898)
- Trianglen Waiting Hall, Trianglen, Copenhagen (1904–07)
- Villa Rødsten (Onsgårdsvej 12), Hellerup (1905–06)
- Aagaard's House, Ryslinge, Funen (1907–08)
- Bentzon's House, Svendborg, Funen (1908)
- Anna Church, Nørrebro, Copenhagen (1911, construction 1913–14, 1921, 1924–28)
- Gedser Church, Gedser, Falster (1913–15)
- Grundtvig's Church, Bispebjerg, Copenhagen (1913, construction 1921–40)
- Villa (Høyrups Allé 35), Hellerup (1915)
- Villa (Gardes Allé 36), Hellerup (1915–20)
- Klintegården, Nyrup Strand (1916–17)
- St. Hans Tveje' Church, Odense, Odense (1916–20)
- On the Hill housing, Bispebjerg, Copenhagen (1924–26)
- Bethlehem Church, Copenhagen (with Kaare Klint, 1930)

== Gallery ==
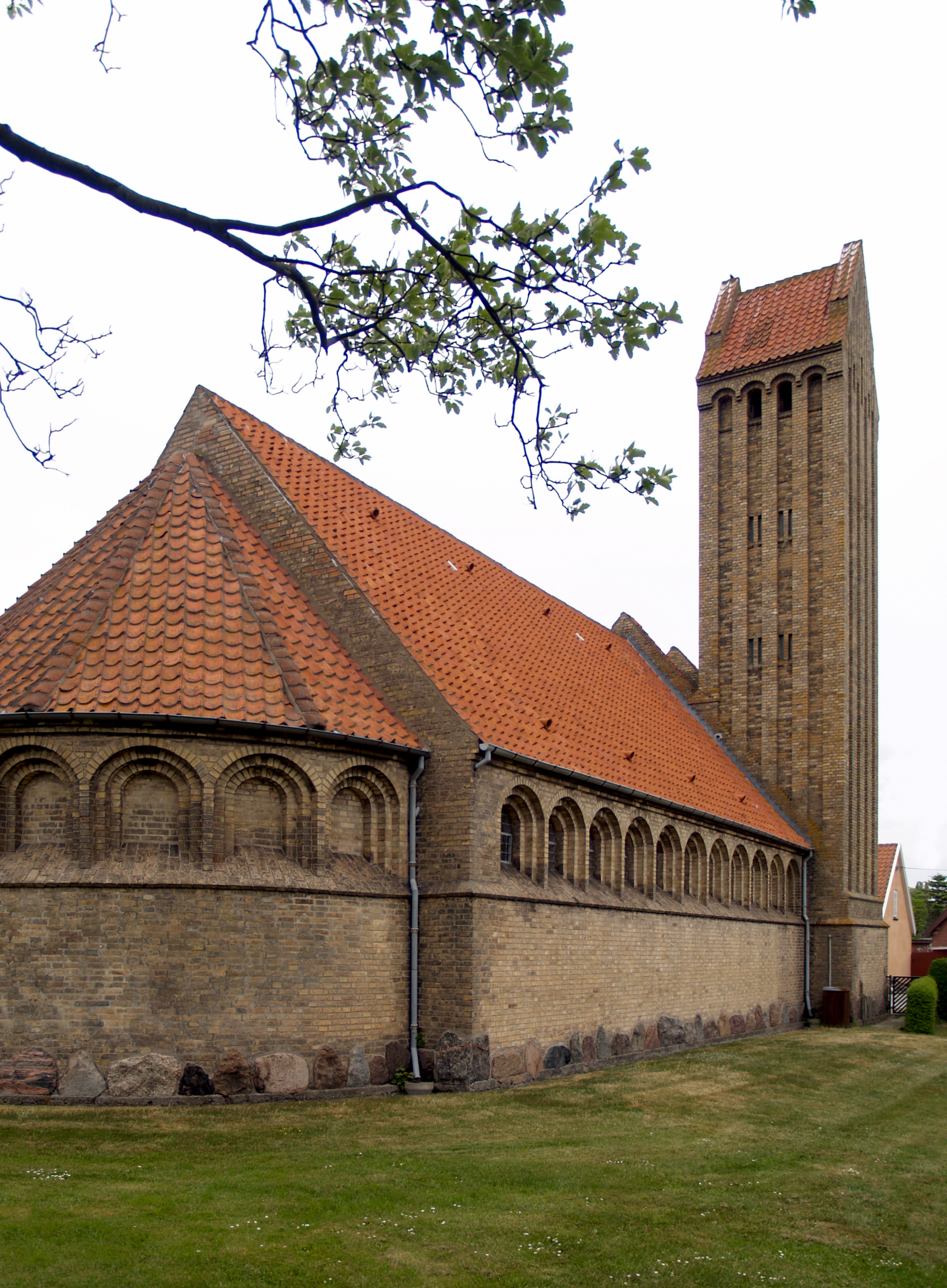
Gedser Church, Gedser, Denmark

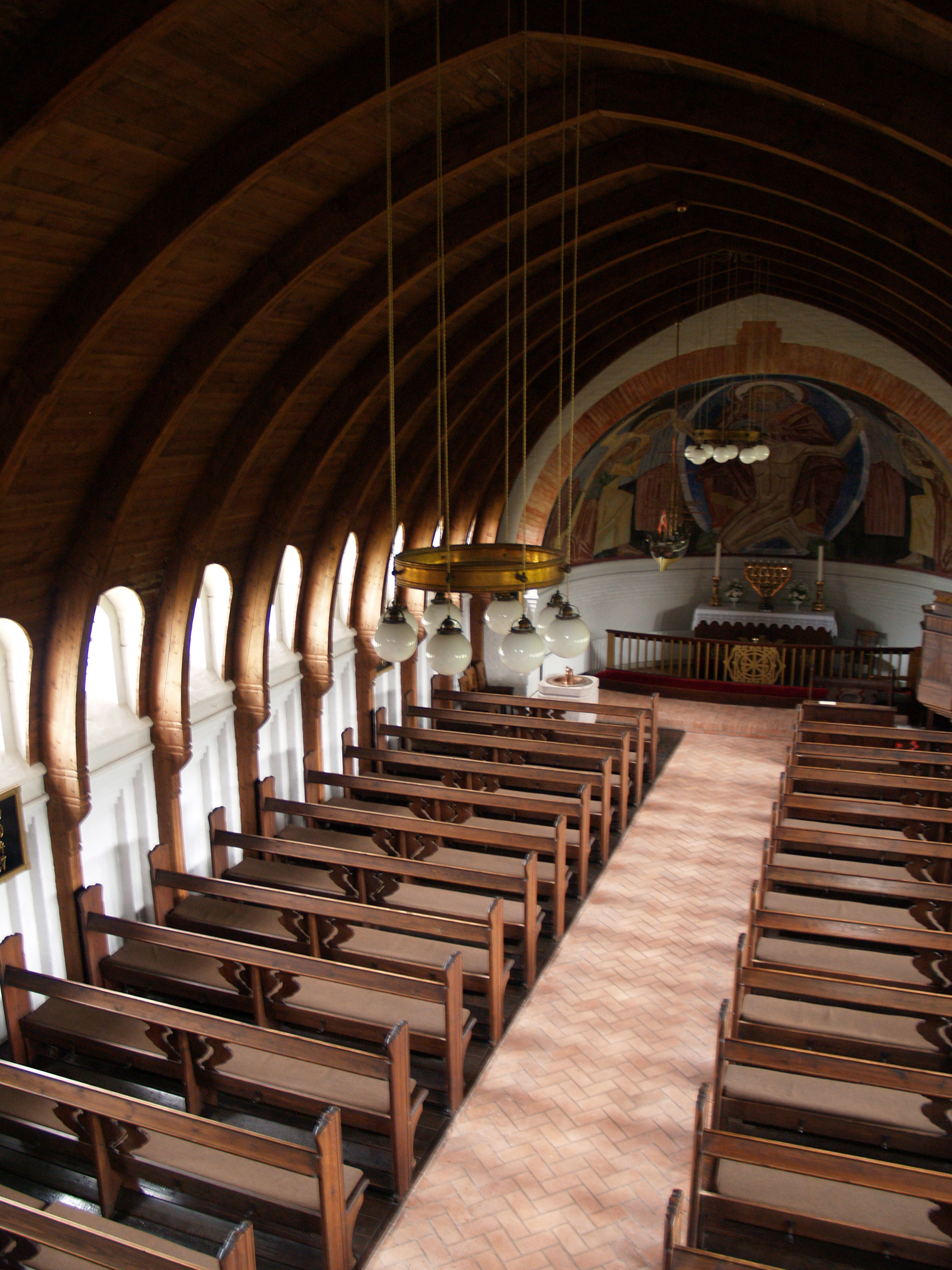
Gedser Church

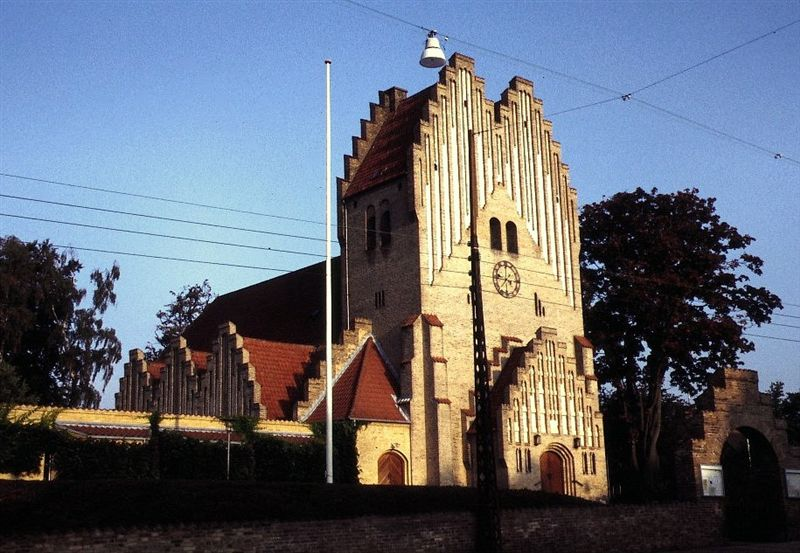
Peace Church, Odense

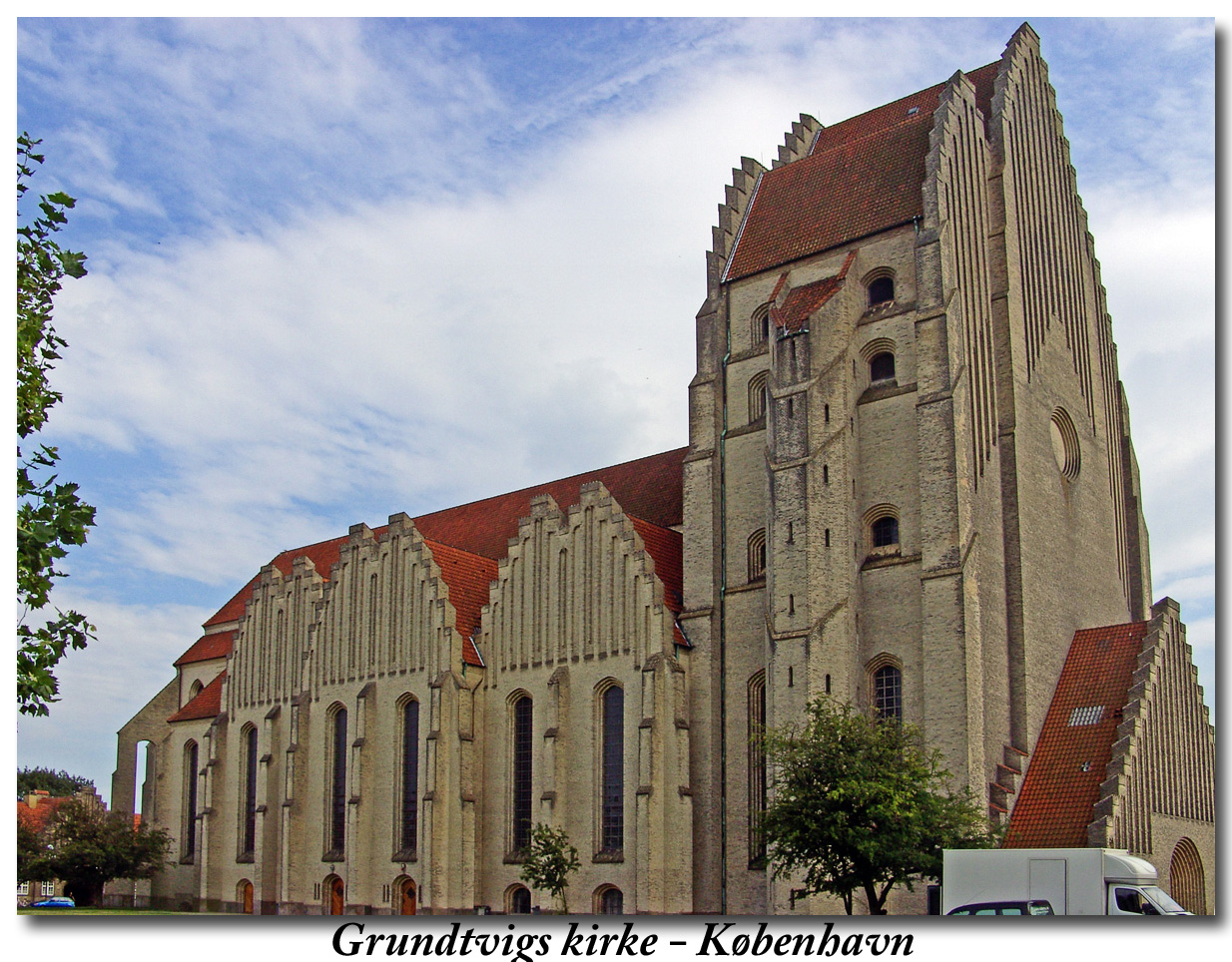
Grundtvig's Church

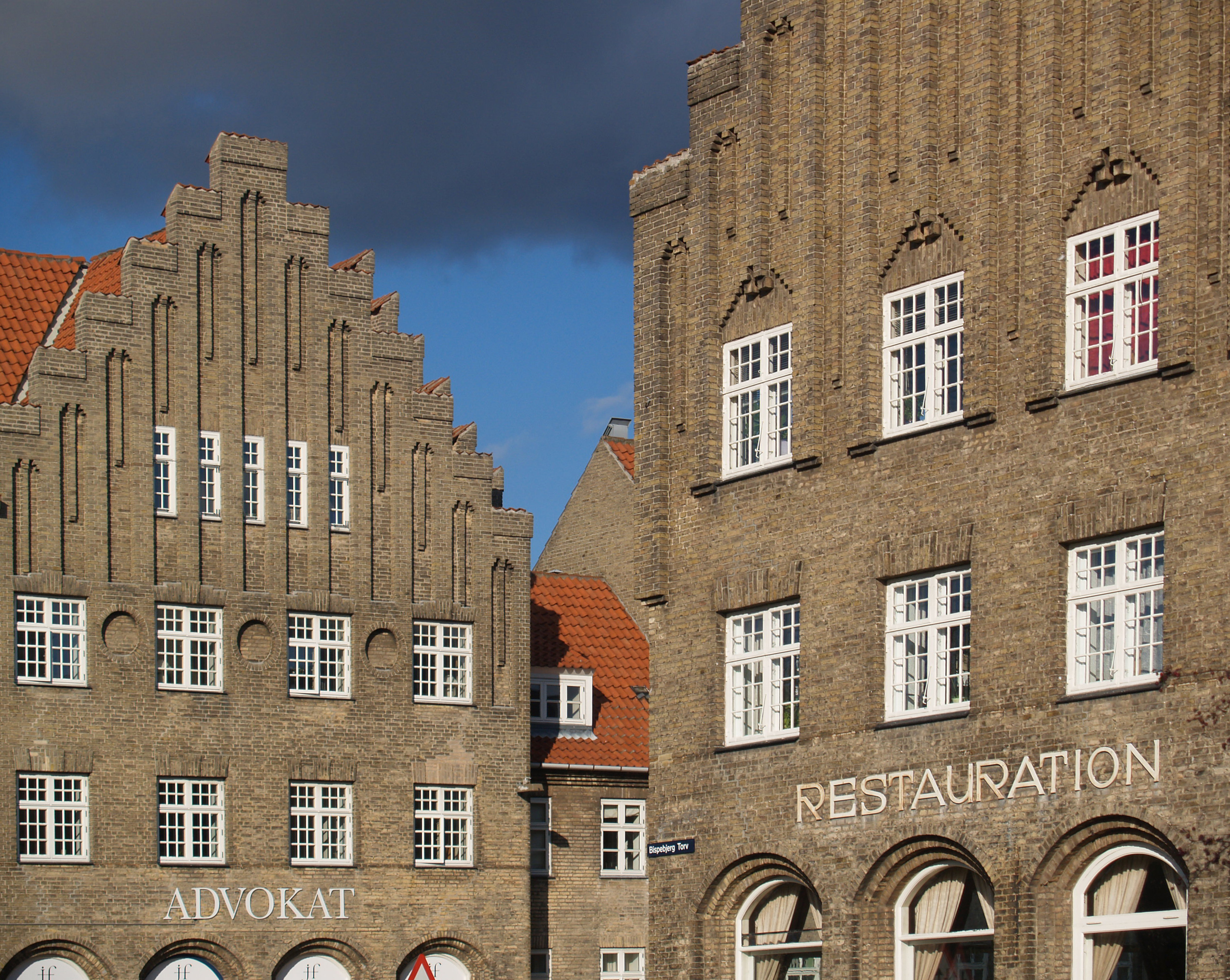
Houses surrounding Grundtvig's Church

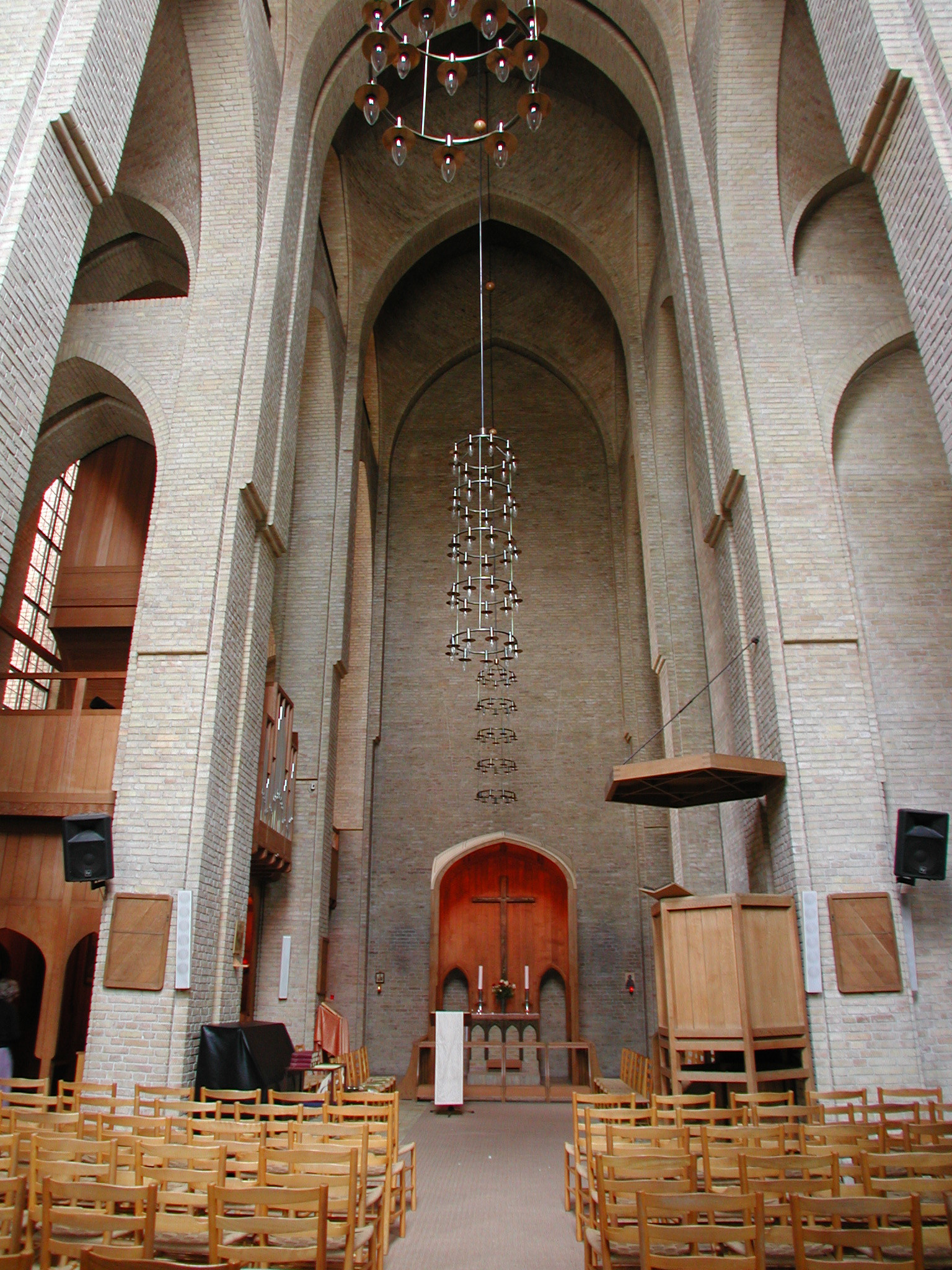
Bethlehem Church, Copenhagen

== See also ==
- Architecture of Denmark
