= Kaare Klint =

Danish architect and furniture designer

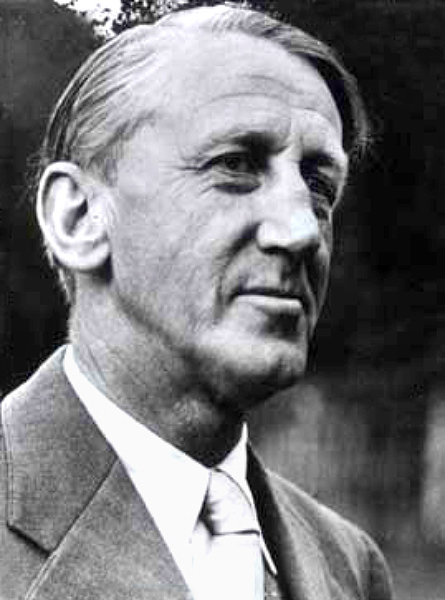
- Born: 15 December 1888; Frederiksberg, Copenhagen
- Died: 28 March 1954 (aged 65)
- Occupation: Architect
- Awards: C. F. Hansen Medal (1954)
- Buildings: Bethlehem Church

Kaare Klint (15 December 1888 – 28 March 1954) was a Danish architect and furniture designer, known as the father of modern Danish furniture design. His style was epitomized by clean, pure lines, use of the best materials of his time and superb craftsmanship.

He was the son of the equally influential architect Peder Vilhelm Jensen-Klint whose monumental Grundtvig's Church he completed after his father's death in 1930.

== Early life and education ==
Kaare Klint was born on 15 December 1888 in the Frederiksberg district of Copenhagen, the son of Peder Vilhelm Jensen-Klint, then a struggling painter about to abandon his artistic career in place of a more secure career in architecture.

Klint apprenticed as a furniture maker in Kalundborg and Copenhagen from 1893 and took classes at technical school in Copenhagen, Jens Møller-Jensens furniture school, and the Artists' Studio Schools under Johan Rohde. He was then articled to Carl Petersen and was also taught the architectural trade by his father, who had completed his first architectural project in 1896.

== Design career ==
In 1914, Klint designed his first piece of furniture, the Faaborg Chair, for Carl Petersen's Faaborg Museum in 1914. He went on to create furniture and fittings for a number of other museums.

From 1921 to 1926 he was responsible for the conversion of Frederiks Hospital into the Danish Museum of Art & Design together with Thorkild Henningsen and Ivar Bentsen. In 1927 he also created a chair in mahogany for the museum which was inspired by English 18th-century chairs.

Klint's carefully researched furniture designs are based on functionality, proportions adapted to the human body, craftsmanship, and the use of high-quality materials. Notable examples of his work include the Propeller Stool (1927), the Safari Chair and the Deck Chair (both 1933), the Church Chair (1936), and the Circle Bed (1938) featuring curved sides and rounded ends, with hand-woven textiles by Lis Ahlmann.

He founded the furniture school at the Royal Academy in 1924. As a result, Klint had a strong influence on Danish furniture, inspiring designers such as Poul Kjærholm and Børge Mogensen.

He also designed textiles, lamps, and organs.

== Completion of his father's unfinished works ==
After his father's death in 1930, Kaare Klint completed his monumental Grundtvig's Church in Copenhagen. Construction had started in 1921 but was not completed until 1940. He also designed the Bethlehem Church, also in Copenhagen, on the basis of his father's sketches. It was built from 1935 to 1937.

== Awards and distinctions ==
- 1949 Honorary Royal Designer for Industry, London
- 1954 C. F. Hansen Medal

== Notable designs ==
Image	Name and description	Original manufacturer (Current manufacturer)	Year
	Faaborg Chair (KK-96620)	Rud. Rasmussen (Carl Hansen & Søn)	1914
	Thorvaldsen Chair The chair was created for Thorvaldsens Museum in Copenhagen in 1922.		1922
	Mix Chair (KK43960)		1930
	Safari Chair (KK47000)	(Carl Hansen & Co.)	1933
	Red Chair (KK-47510)	Rud. Rasmussen	1933
	Church Chair	Fritz Hansen Eftf and Bernstorffsminde Møbelfabrik A/S	1936
	Spherical Bed	Rud. Rasmussen	1936
	Barcelona Chair (KK-3758)	Rud. Rasmussen	1940

== See also ==
- Le Klint
- Danish modern

== Literature ==
- Harkær, Gorm: Kaare Klint, 2010, Copenhagen: Klintiana, Vol 1: 660 p., Vol 2: 160 p. ISBN 978-87-994184-2-8.
