= Gotved Institute =

Gymnastics centre in Copenhagen, Denmark

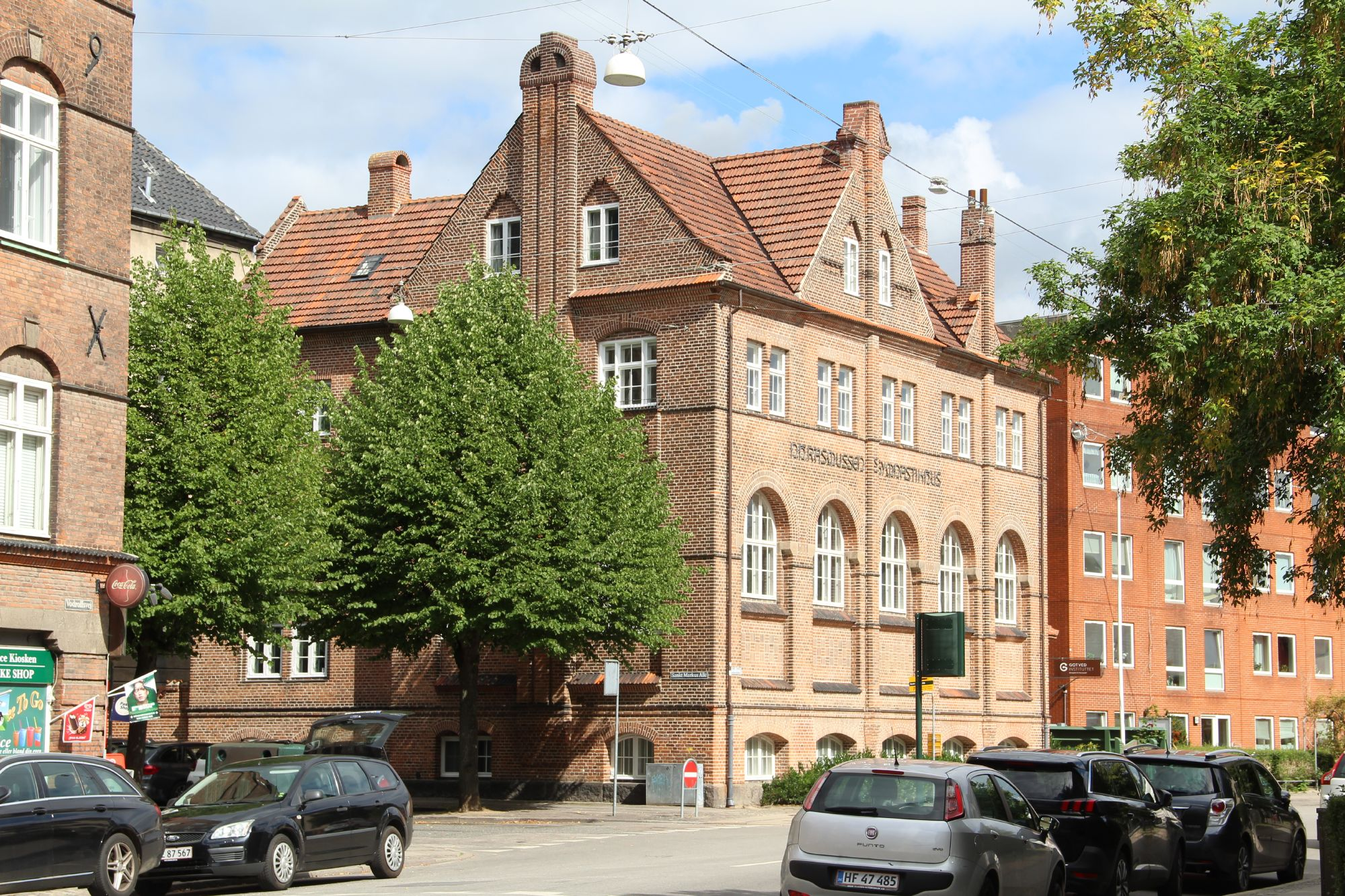
The Gotved Institute in Frederiksberg,

The Gotved Institute is a gymnastics centre on Vodroffsvej in the Frederiksberg district of Copenhagen, Denmark. Its building was completed in 1898 to design by Peder Vilhelm Jensen-Klint and is listed as a national heritage building.

== History ==
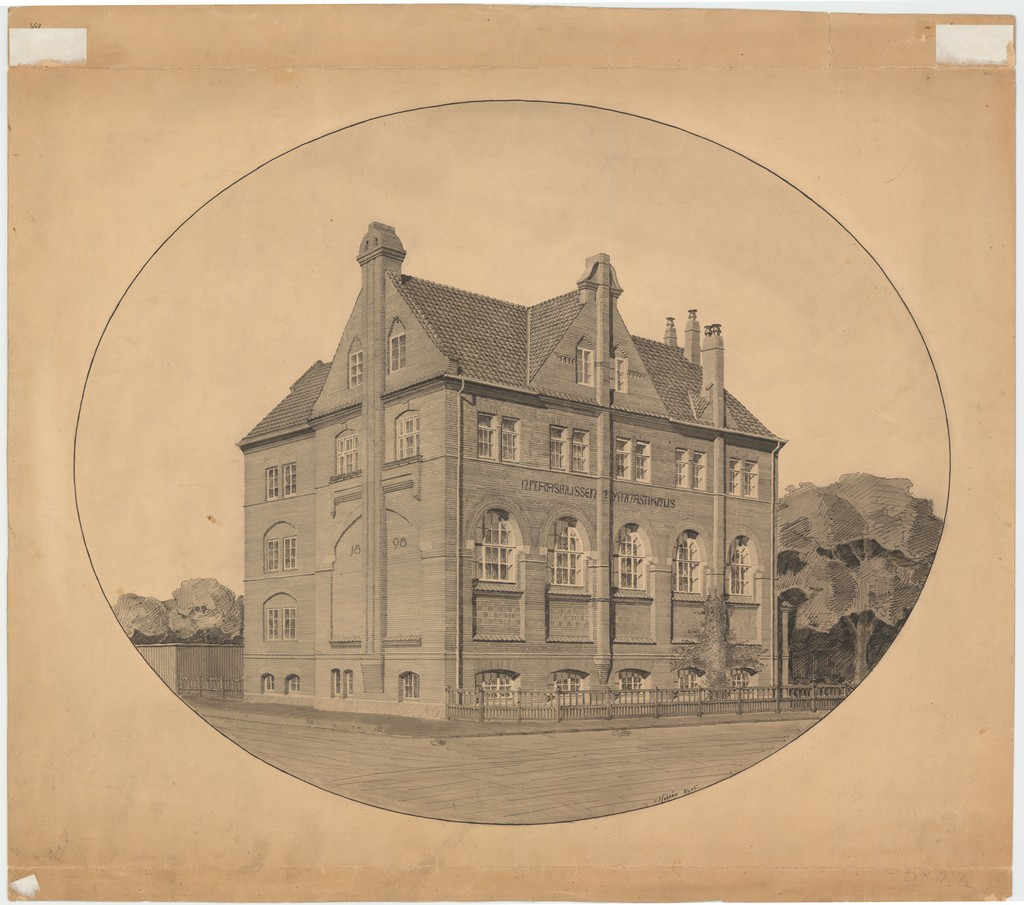
Drawing of the building by Jensen-Klint

The Gymnastics House was built for N. H. Rasmussen in 1898. He had previously been associated Vallekilde Folk High School in Odsherred. The new building was designed by Peder Vilhelm Jensen-Klint while the artist Niels Larsen Stevns created all decorative works and carvings. The institute was later taken over by his daughter, Helle Gotved, who developed her own principles in the 1940s.

The Gotved Institute was turned into a self-owning institution in 2007. The A.P. Møller og hustru Chastine McKinney Møller Foundation financed a renovation of the roof and façade in 2009. Realdania, the Velux Foundation and the Knud Højgaard Foundation funded a renovation of the interior in 2011.

== Today ==
The Gotved Institute is today led by Søren Ekman og Henriette Bolt Mortensen.
