= Gedser Church =

- Gedser Kirke
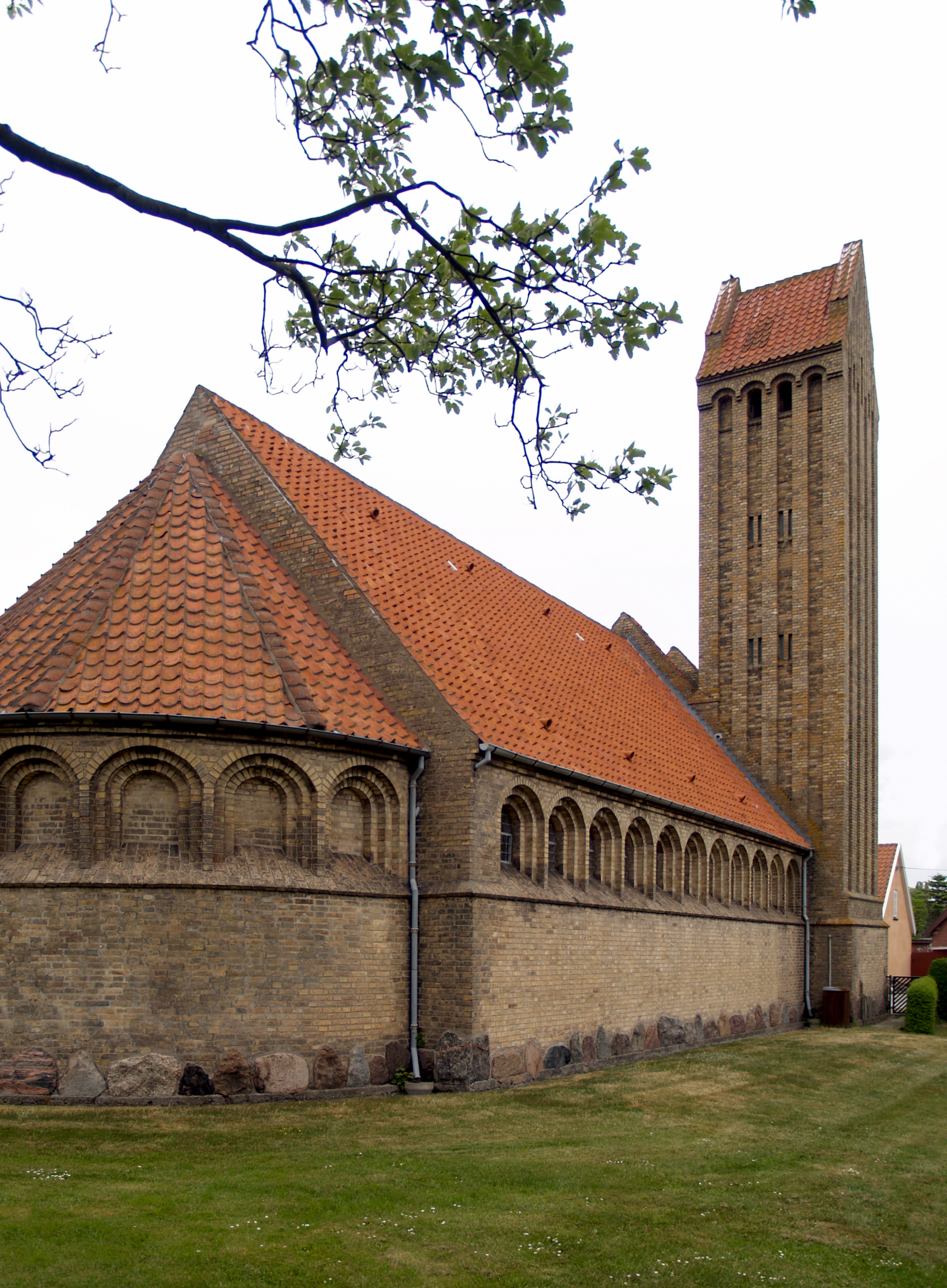
- Gedser Church
- Location: Gedser, Falster
- Country: Denmark
- Denomination: Church of Denmark

Architecture
- Architect(s): Peder Vilhelm Jensen-Klint, Carl Andersen
- Years built: 1913–1915

Administration
- Diocese: Diocese of Lolland–Falster
- Deanery: Falster Provsti
- Parish: Gedser Sogn

Gedser Church lies in the town of Gedser on the southern tip of the Danish island of Falster. It is the church of Gedser Parish. Completed in 1915, it was designed by Peder Vilhelm Jensen-Klint, best known for designing Grundtvig's Church in Copenhagen.

== History ==
Over the centuries, the two parish churches of southern Falster had been located in Skelby and Gedesby. When Gedser grew to a community of 1,000 to 1,300 around the end of the 19th century, the need for a church became stronger. While visiting the town, the crown prince, later King Frederik VIII, is quoted as saying: "It is too far to Gedesby and it is good to hear God's word every once in a while."

In 1907, a church committee was set up and Peder Vilhelm Jensen-Klint was commissioned to design the building. Despite a very tight budget, construction began in 1913 and the church was consecrated on Palm Sunday 1915.

Legend has it that the day a church is completed in Gedser, the sea will wipe away the town. Somewhere or other, there is therefore a missing brick so that it can never be said that the church has been completed.

== Architecture ==
With its yellow brickwork and vertical ornamentation resembling organ pipes, the exterior bears similarities to Jensen-Klint's later and much more famous work, Grundtvig's Church in Copenhagen. But this does not extend to the inside which is dominated by the imposing timber structure of the roof which looks like an inverted ship's hull, reflecting the town's nautical traditions as a port and important ferry terminal. The ribs work as supporting columns. The most striking ornamentation of the interior is the fresco in the demi-domal vault above the choir. When the church was completed, there were no funds for a painting but by 1924, public collections and gifts had provided the necessary means. On Jensen-Klint's recommendation, a still young Elof Riseby was charged with the assignment. The fresco is inspired by John 3:16: For God so loved the world that He gave His only begotten Son.

== Gallery ==
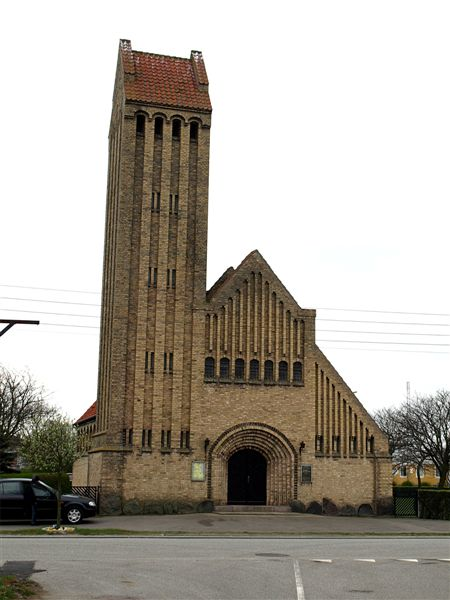
Facade with main entrance

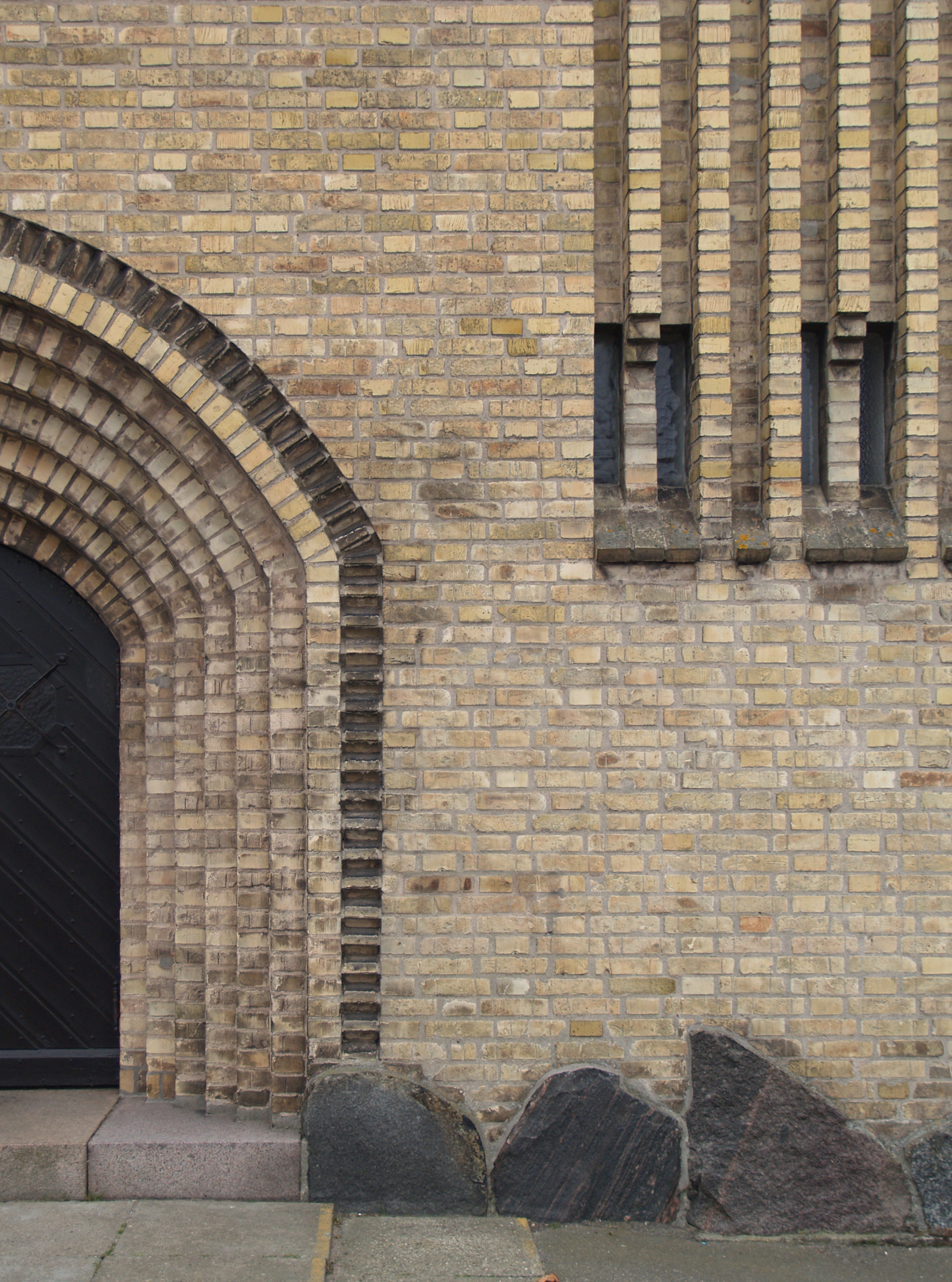
Facade detail

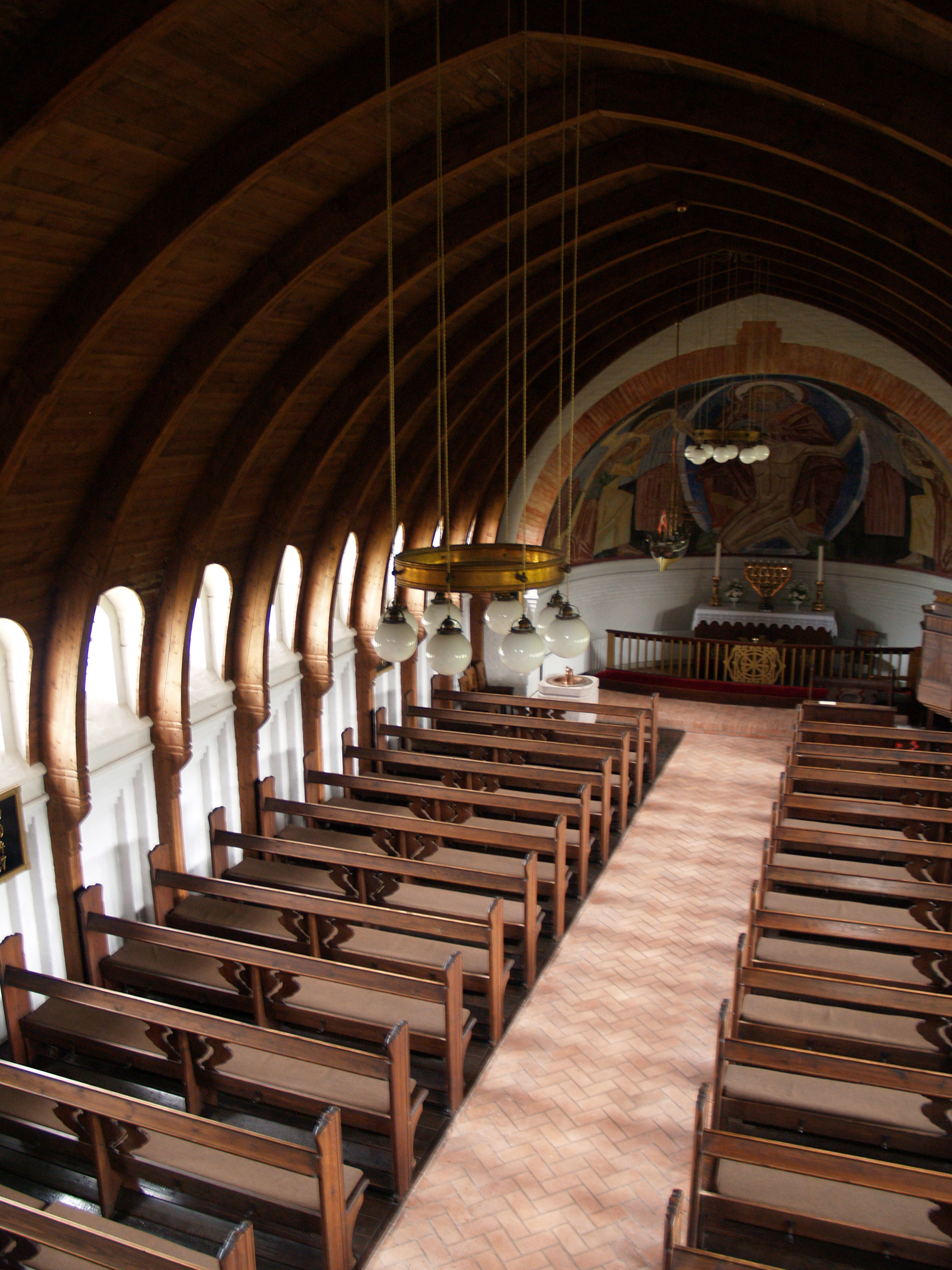
The interior

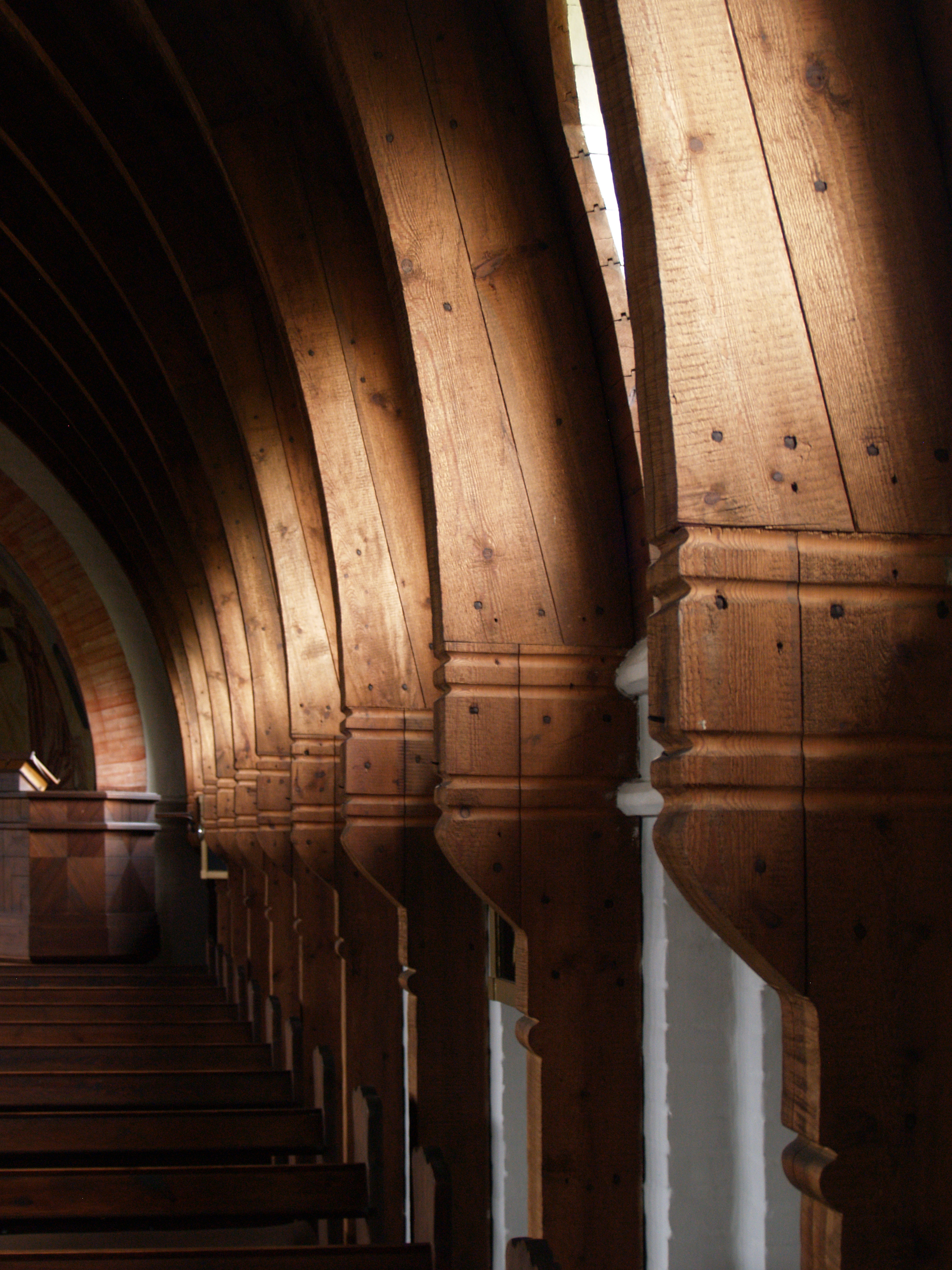
Ribs used as supporting columns

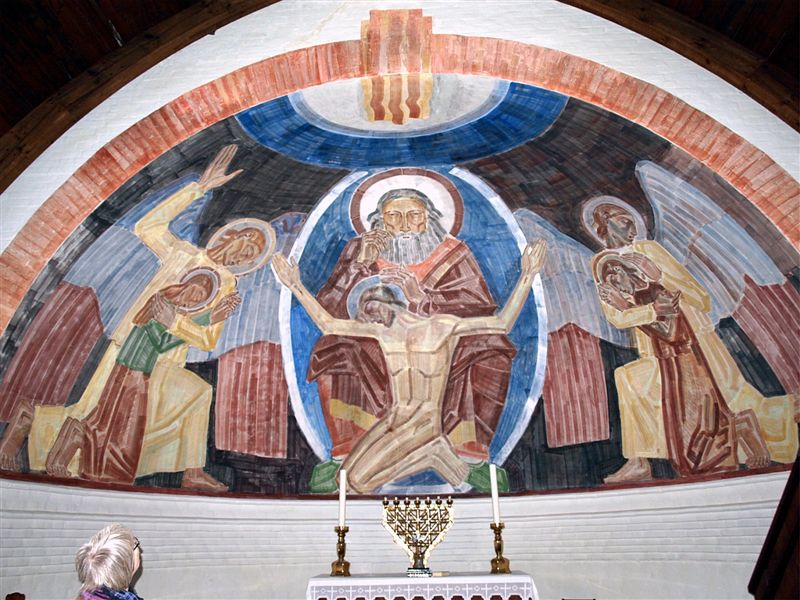
Altar painting

== See also ==
- Architecture of Denmark
