= Grundtvig's Church =

Coordinates: 55°42′59.7″N 12°32′01″E

- Grundtvig's Memorial Church
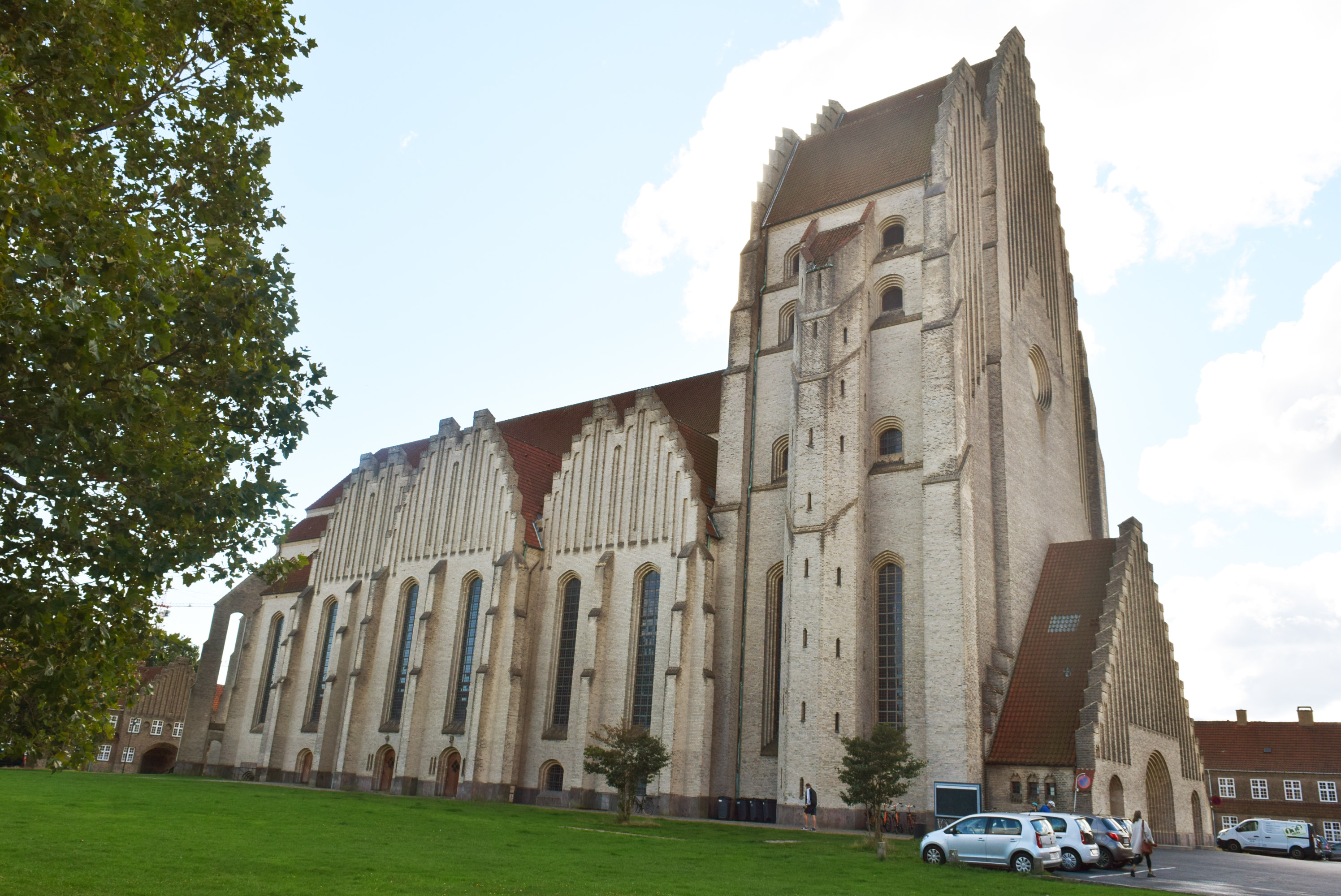
- Grundtvig's Church
- Location: Copenhagen, Denmark
- Denomination: Church of Denmark
- Website: www.grundtvigskirke.dk

Architecture
- Architect: Peder Vilhelm Jensen-Klint
- Architectural type: Expressionism
- Completed: 1927 (inaugurated); 1940 (completed)

Specifications
- Capacity: 1440 seats
- Length: 76 metres (249 feet)
- Width: 35 metres (115 feet)
- Height: 49 metres (161 feet)

Administration
- District: Bispebjerg

Grundtvig's Church (Danish: Grundtvigs Kirke) is located in the Bispebjerg district of Copenhagen, Denmark. It is a rare example of expressionist church architecture. Due to its originality, it is one of the best known churches in the city.

== History ==
The commission for the construction of a church to be named after the Danish philosopher, pastor and hymn writer N. F. S. Grundtvig was decided through a competition, won by Peder Vilhelm Jensen-Klint in 1913. The foundation of the new church was only laid after World War I, on 8 September 1921, Grundtvig's birthday. Building took place mainly from 1921 to 1926 when the tower section was completed, leading to the initial inauguration of the so-called Tower Church in 1927. Further work on the interior and on adjacent buildings continued until 1940 and was completed by Klint's son Kaare Klint after his father's death in 1930. The church stands at the centre of a residential development (1924–36), also in yellow brick, designed by Jensen-Klint in harmony with the church.

== Architecture ==
Jensen-Klint's design for Grundtvig's Church is a synthesis of architectural styles. In preparation for the project, the architect studied many Danish village churches, particularly those on the island of Zealand with stepped gables. Their traditional building techniques, materials and decoration inspired his design. Klint merged the modern geometric forms of Brick Expressionism with the classical vertical of Gothic architecture.

The most striking feature of the building is its west façade, reminiscent of a westwork or of the exterior of a church organ. It includes the 49 m (160 ft) tall bell tower. The imposing façade with its strong verticality guides one's eyes towards the sky. The bottom half of the tower is simple brick while the upper reaches present the appearance of one solid, rippling surface.

Klint decorated the nave with a version of the stepped gables common on Danish churches, but reinterpreted by doubling the apex. The nave was designed with generous dimensions: the triple-aisled hall church is 76 m (259 ft) long in total and 35 m (115 ft) wide; the nave has a height of 22 m (72 ft).

== Interior ==
The interior, inspired by Gothic architecture and comparable in size to Copenhagen cathedral, holds a congregation of 1,440. Some five million yellow bricks, a typical Danish building material, were used for the edifice. In its floor plan, the interior resembles that of a typical Gothic church with a nave, two lateral aisles and a small transept. Its proportions are also Gothic: a long, narrow nave, an extremely high ceiling, the columns which rise up to pointed arches and the ribbed groin vaults above the nave and aisles. But it is the yellow brick and the lack of ornamentation which contribute to the Gothic verticality while adhering to the minimalist modern aesthetic.

== The two organs ==
The church has two organs. The one on the north side of the nave near the chancel was built in 1940 by Marcussen & Søn, the façade being designed by Kaare Klint. It has 14 stops, two manuals and a pedalboard. The much larger Marcussen instrument at the western end of the nave was added in 1965 with a façade designed by Kaare Klint's son, Esben Klint. It has 55 stops, four manuals and a pedalboard. The largest of its pipes weighs 425 kg (937 lb) and, with a length of 32 feet (11 m), is the longest organ pipe in Scandinavia.

== Integration and flanking buildings ==
The scheme also included the construction of a number of buildings collectively known as On the Hill (da. På Bjerget) on each side of the church, placing it in a symmetrical context to enhance its visual impact. Designed by Jensen-Klint in collaboration with Vilhelm Wittrup, Charles I. Schou and Georg Gøssel, the buildings contain the parish hall and apartments and were built from 1924 to 1926.

A long tree-lined road leads through Bispebjerg cemetery directly towards the church and the flanking buildings, creating a viewing axis similar to those of the Baroque period.

== Grundtvig's church today ==
The church is open to visitors all year, not just at the times of services. The great Marcussen organ is regularly used for concerts.

The church is equipped with a wheelchair stair lift for the disabled people.

== Gallery ==
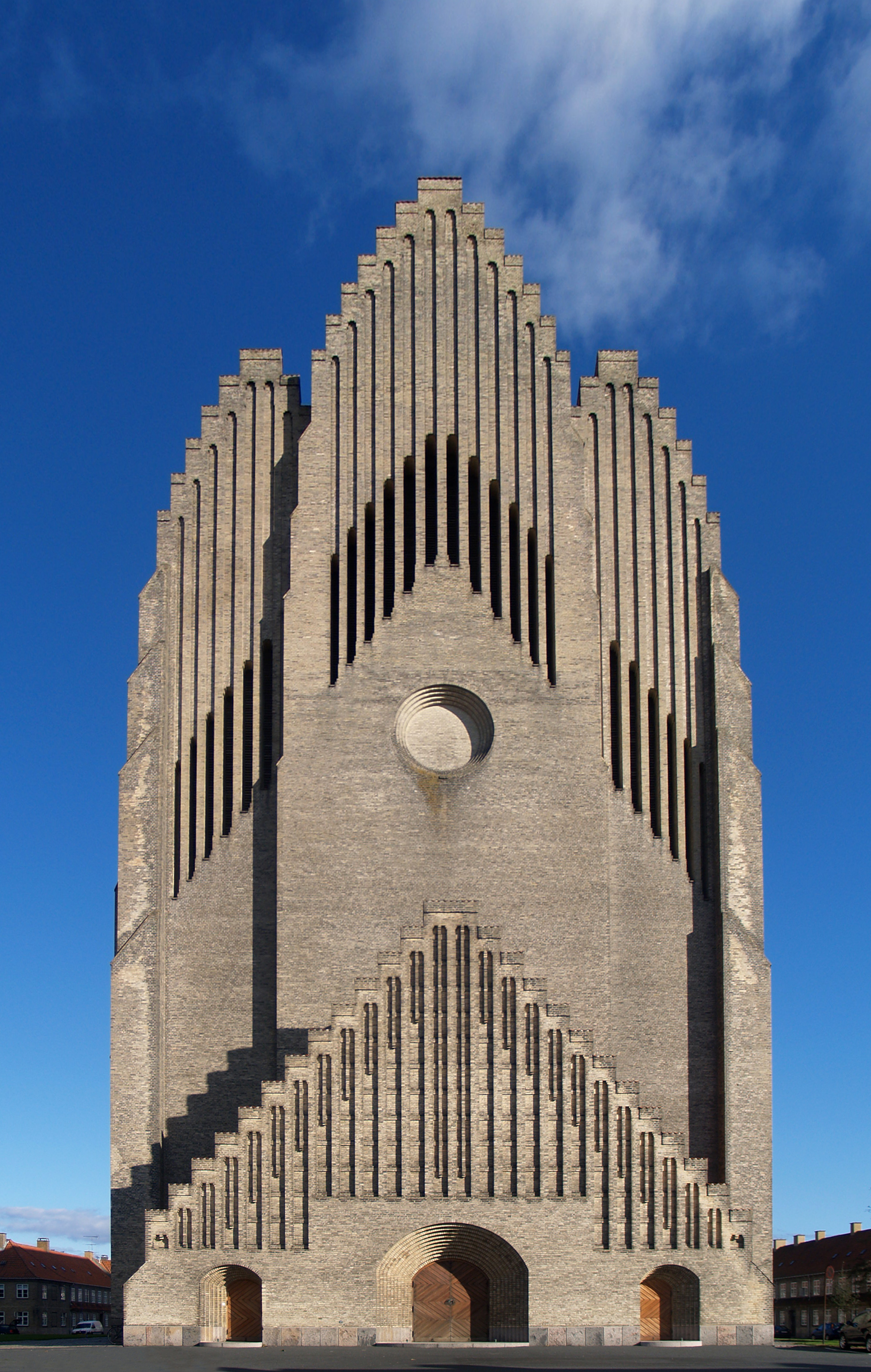
Façade

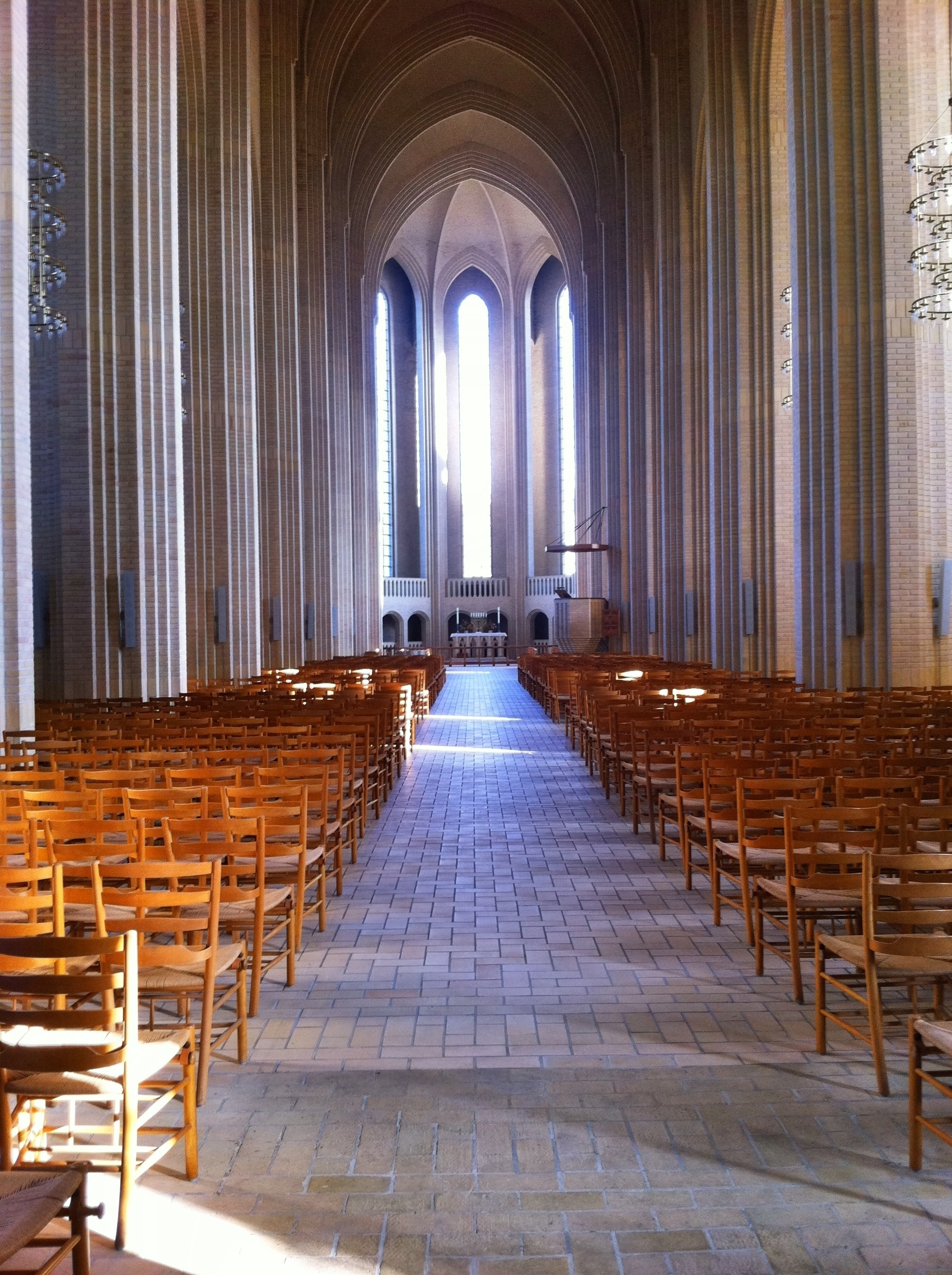
Nave, looking towards choir

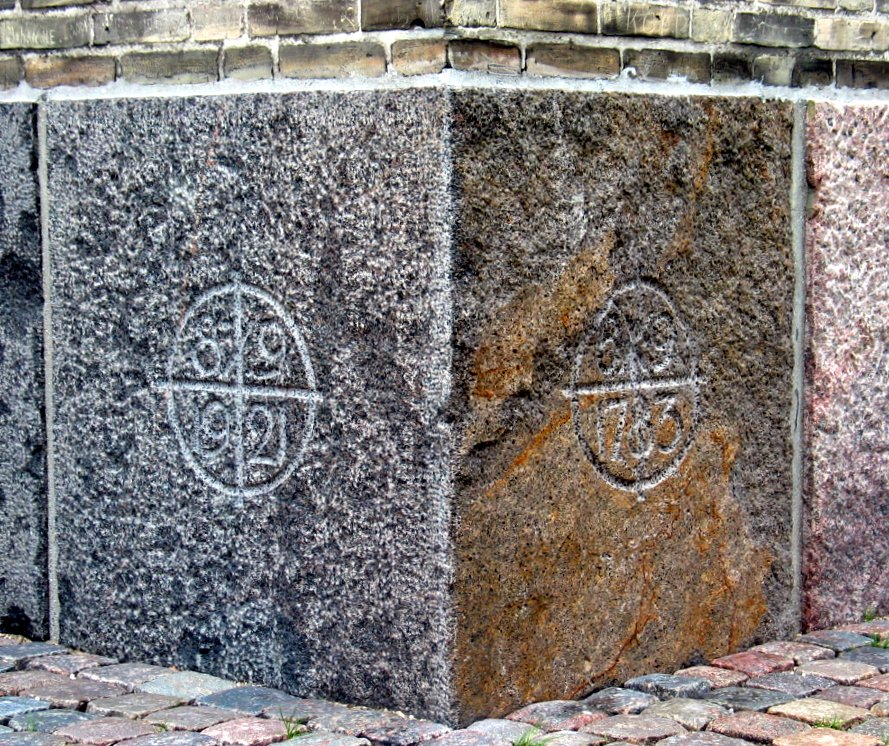
Foundation stone

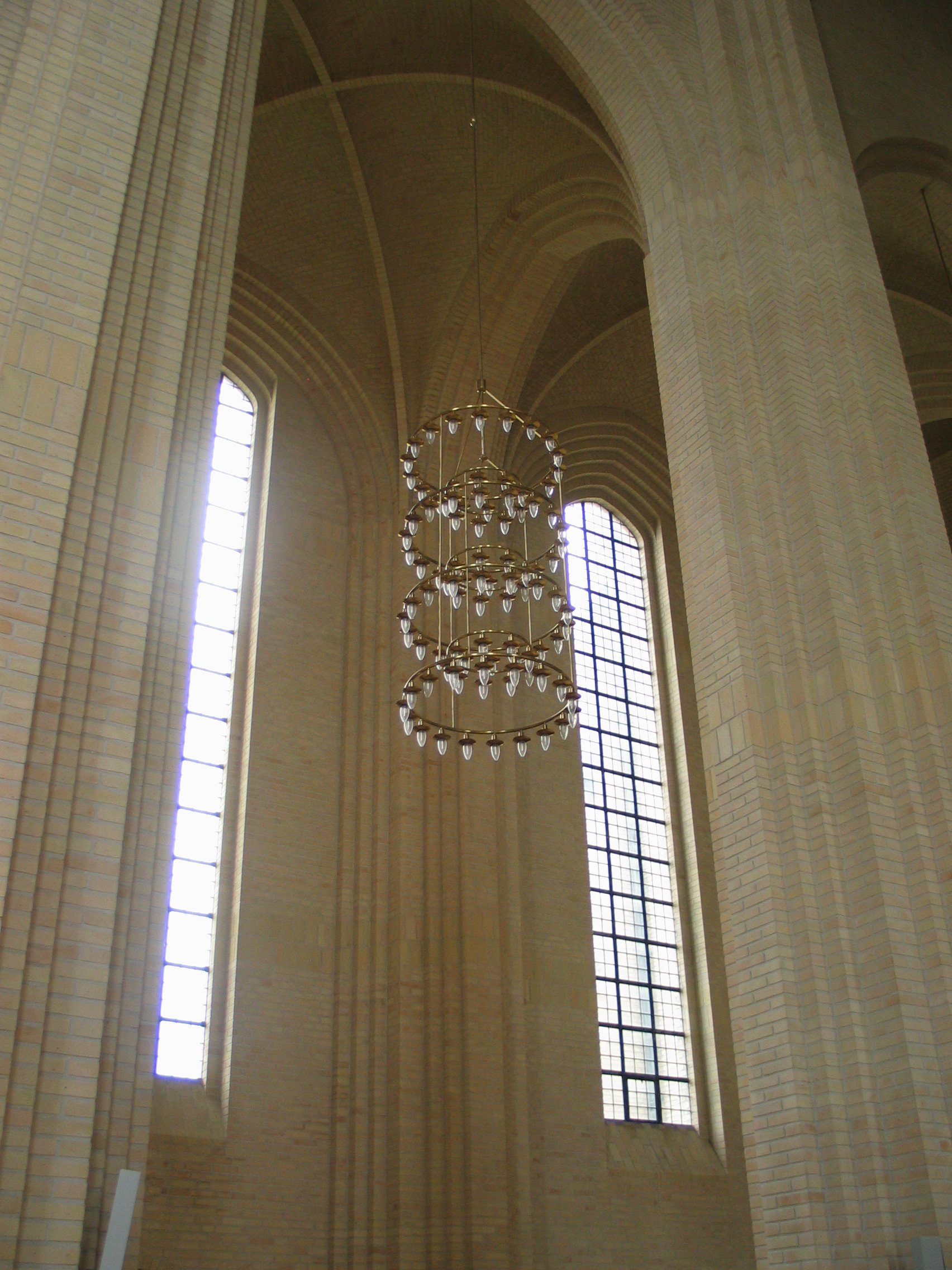
Chandelier

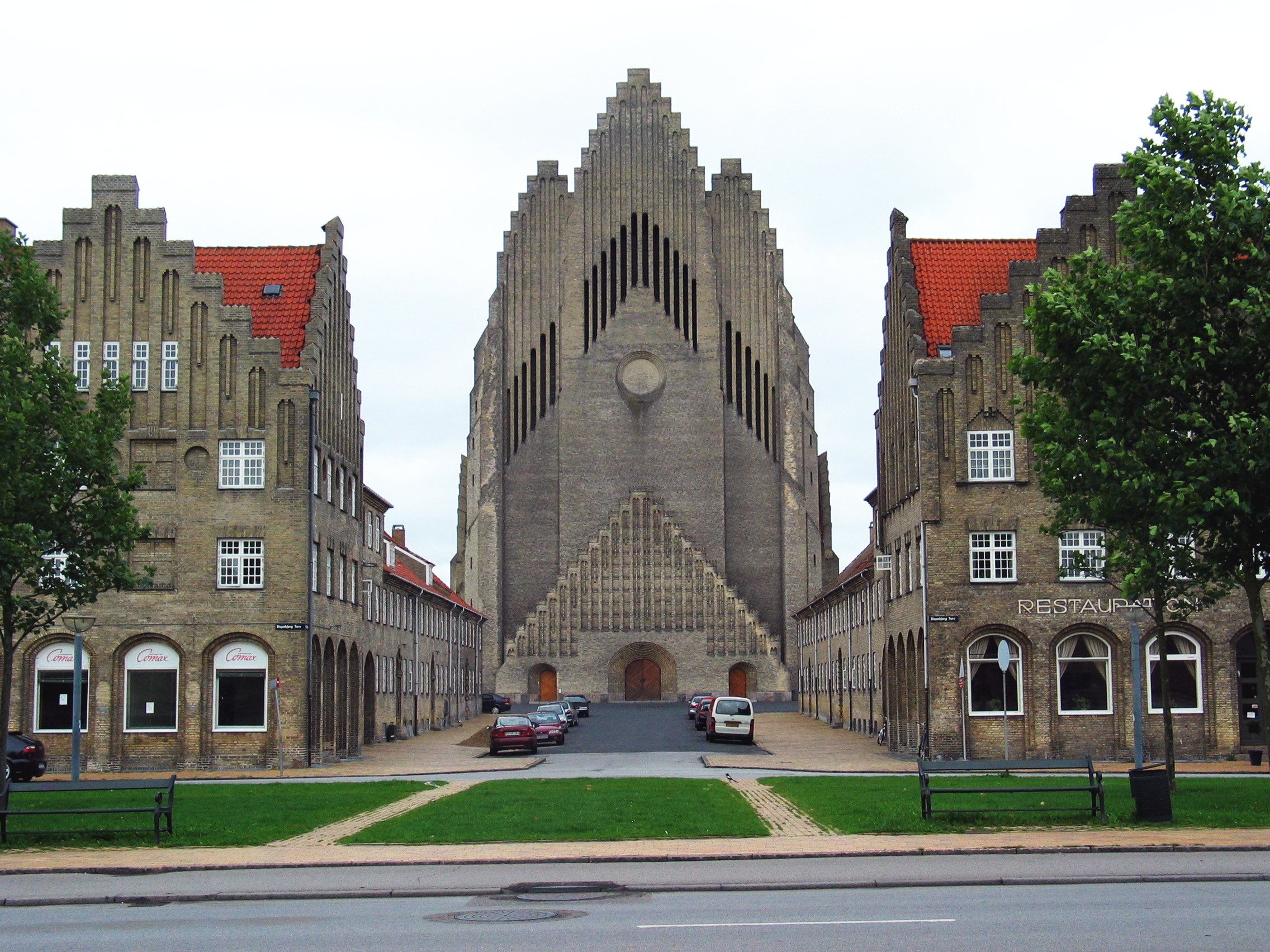
West façade

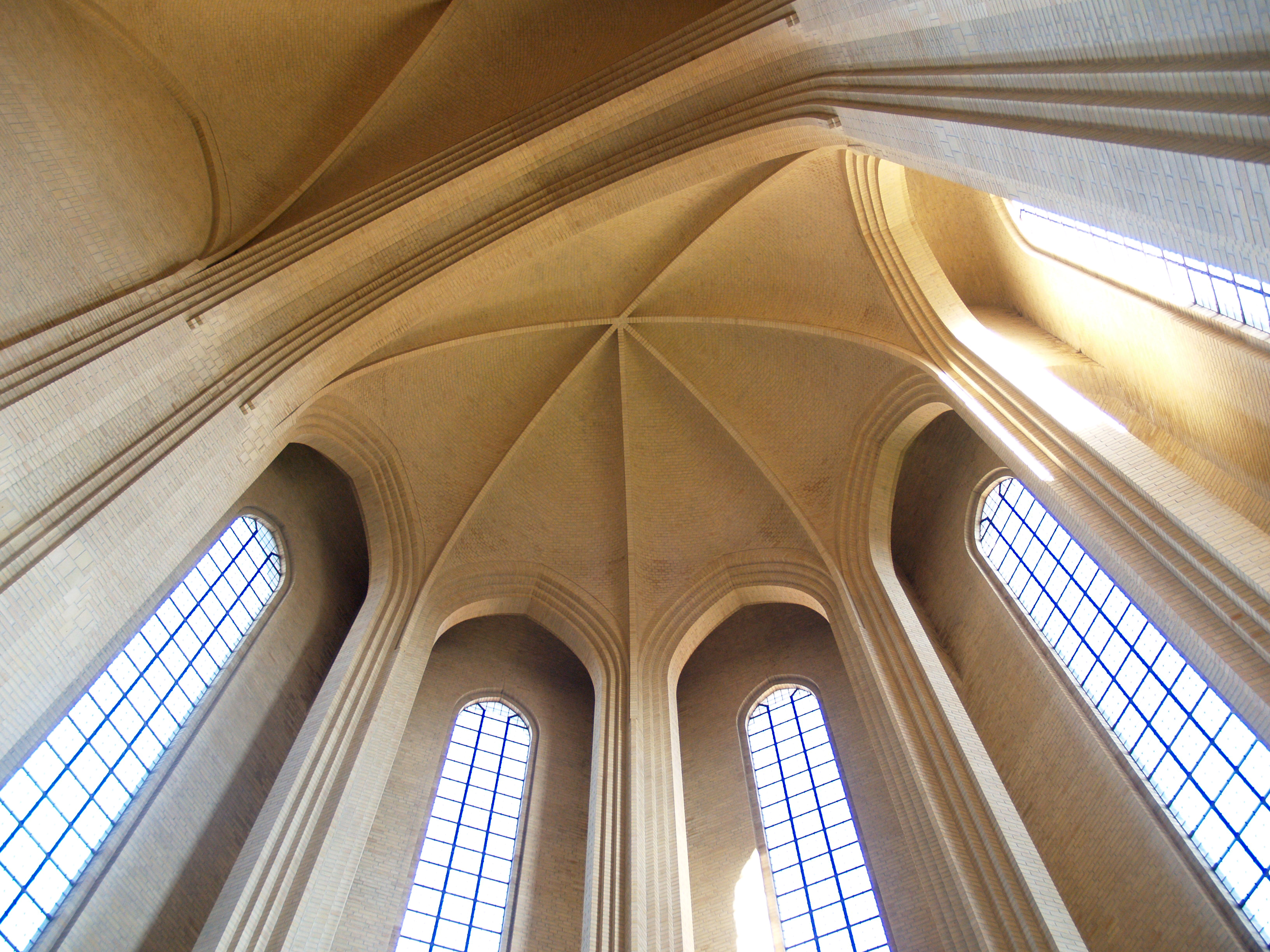
Vaulting detail

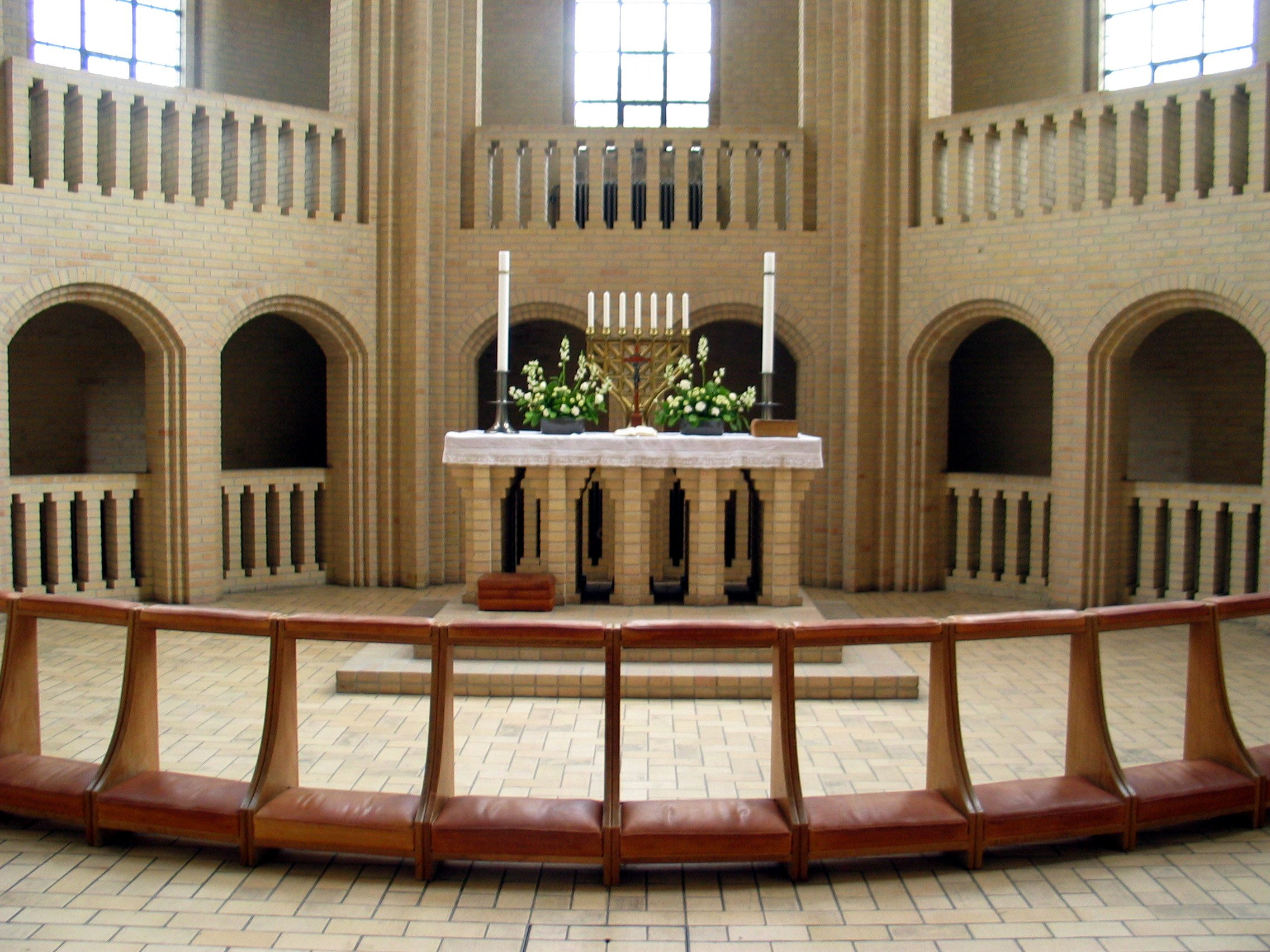
Altar

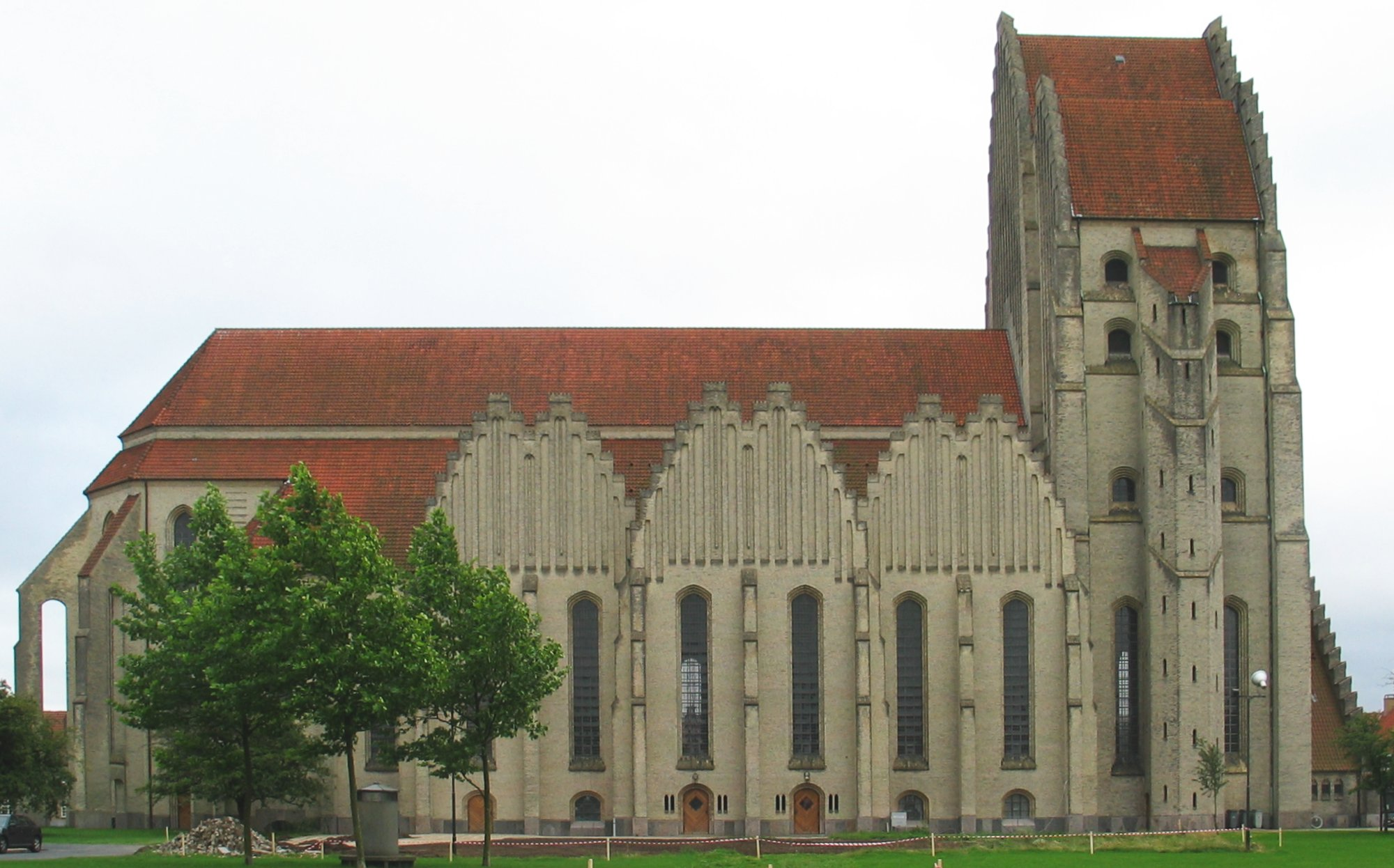
Nave, north side

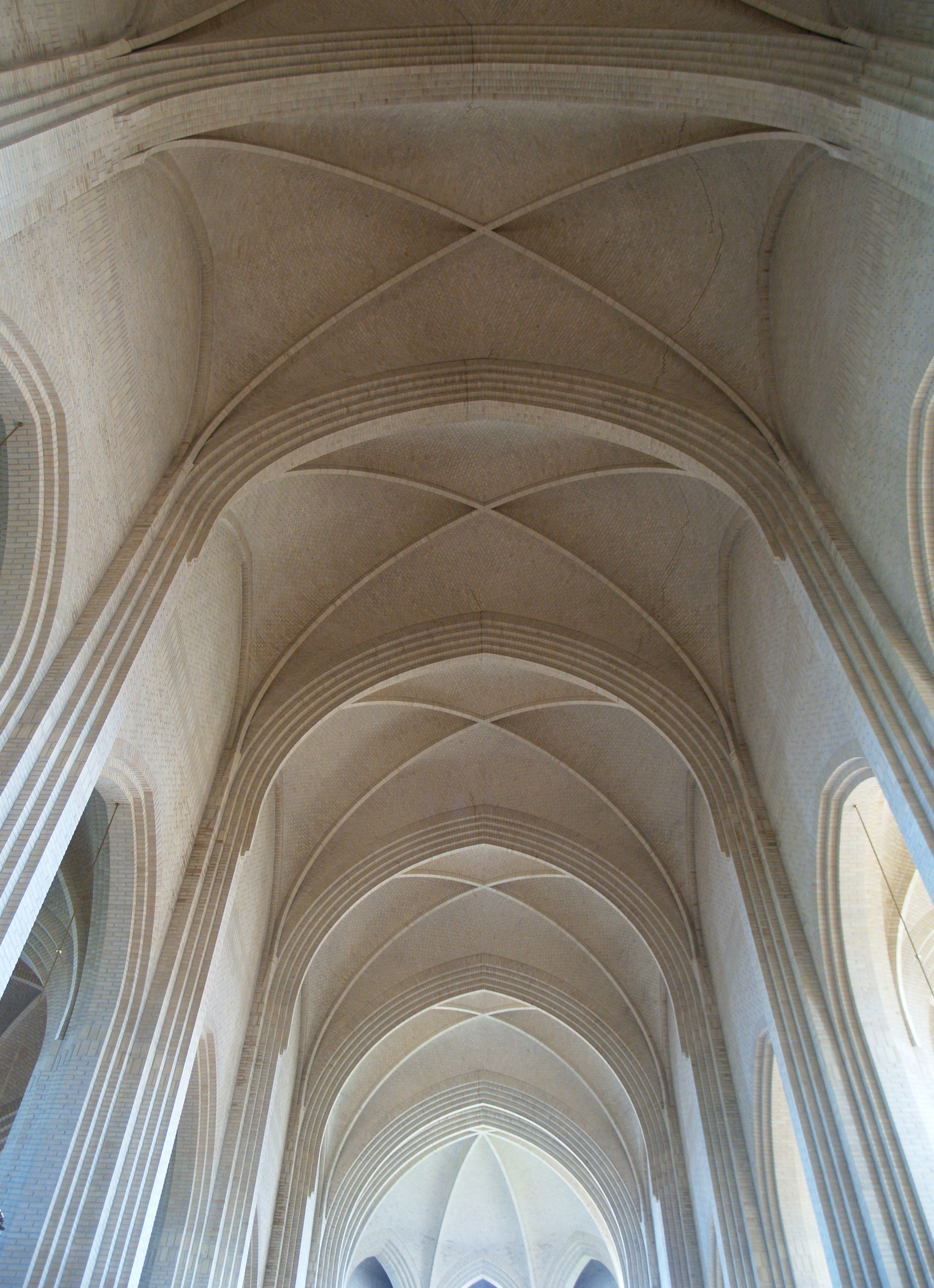
Vaulting in the southern section of the nave

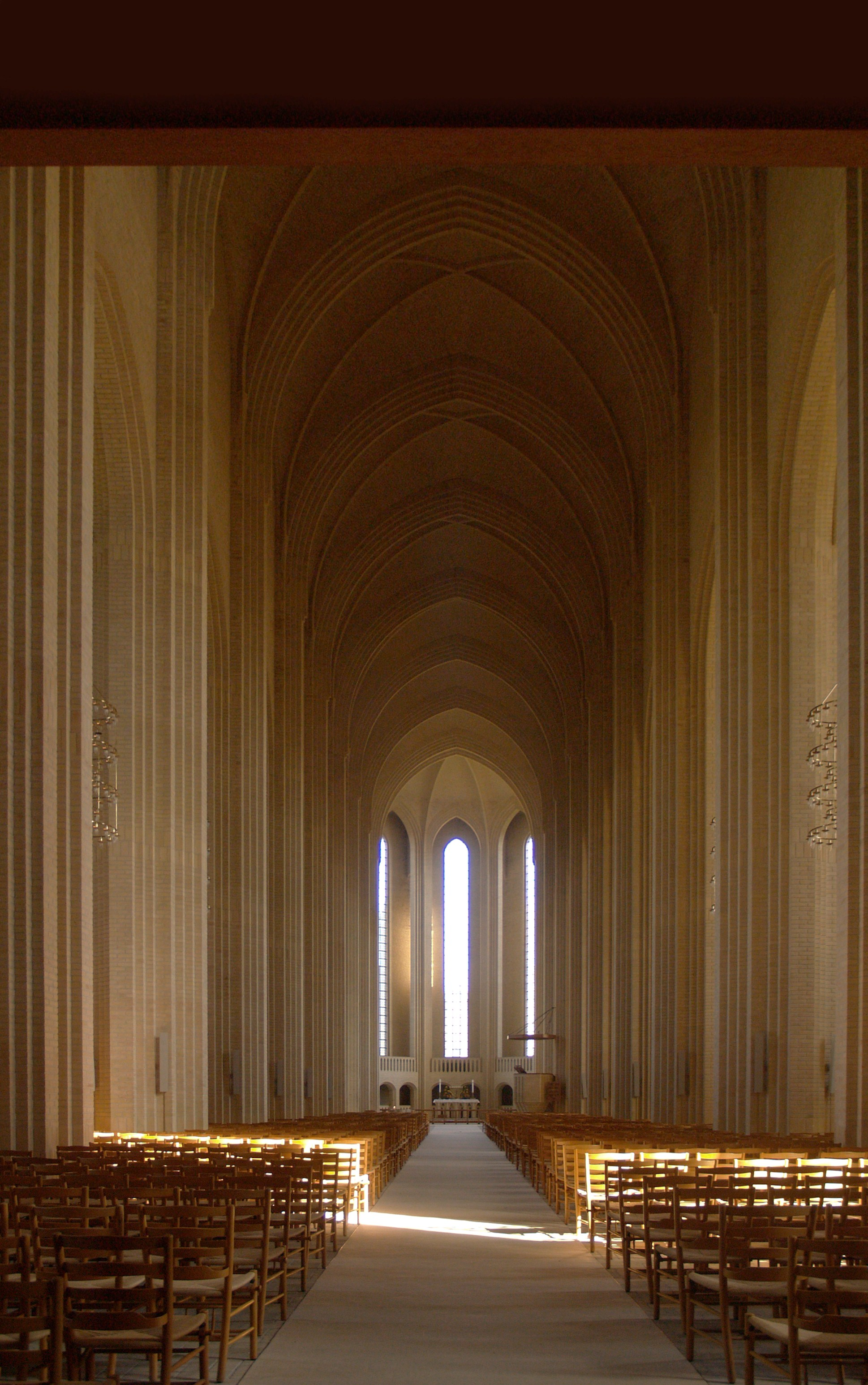
Interior

== See also ==
- Hallgrímskirkja in Reykjavík, begun a few years after Grundtvig's Church, is a comparable synthesis of Gothic and modern stylistic elements.

== Bibliography ==
- Harkær, Gorm (2010), Kaare Klint, Klintiana.
