= Arnold Krog =

Danish architect (1856–1931)

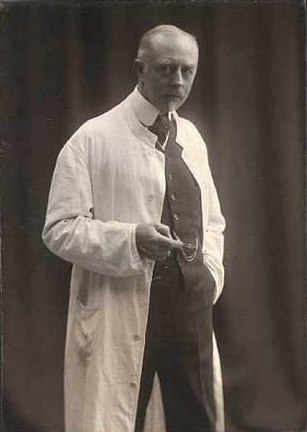
- Born: 18 March 1856; Frederiksværk, Denmark
- Died: 7 June 1931 (aged 75); Tisvildeleje, Denmark
- Education: Royal Danish Academy of Fine Arts
- Occupation: Porcelain designer
- Known for: Royal Copenhagen (1774-1916)

Arnold Krog (18 March 1856 - 7 June 1931) was a Danish architect, painter and designer who is remembered for his achievements as artistic director of Royal Copenhagen from 1884 to 1916. He revived the company after a period of decline, moving away from the stiff Empire style of previous decades in favour of a more Impressionist style which combined underglaze painting techniques with inspiration from Japanese imagery and European naturalism. He designed the Polar Bear Fountain for the Peace Palace in The Hague. He has also designed furniture and silverware and took up landscape painting after his retirement from the porcelain factory in 1916.

== Early life and education ==
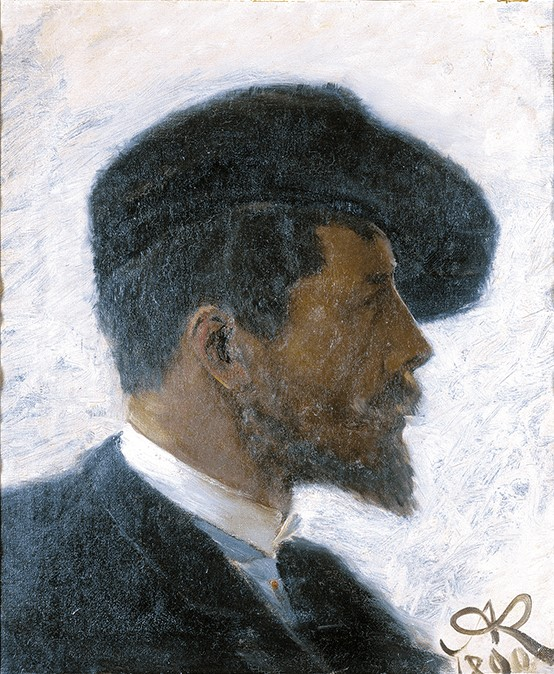
Self-portrait by Arnold Krog

Krog was born in Frederiksværk, the son of inspector at Frederiksværk Iron Works Hans Jacob Grøgaard Krog (1822–88) and Jenny Meyer (1824–1905).

He graduated from Efterslægtselskabets Skole in 1873. He then apprenticed as a mason for half a year C. Wienberg and studied drawing under C. V. Nielsen. He enrolled at the Royal Danish Academy of Fine Arts' School of Architecture in October 1874, graduating in 1880. In 1877–78, together with Martin Nyrop, Hack Kampmann and Martin Borch, he contributed to Hans J. Holm's Surveying of Kronborg Castle. He studied Majolica ceramics on a journey to Italy in 1877–83. He also worked as a draftsman for Ludvig Fenger and contributed to Ferdinand Meldahl and Heinrich Hansen's interior restoration of Frederiksborg Castle and received attention for his Moorish Hall at the Panopticon Building in Copenhagen.

== Royal Copenhagen ==
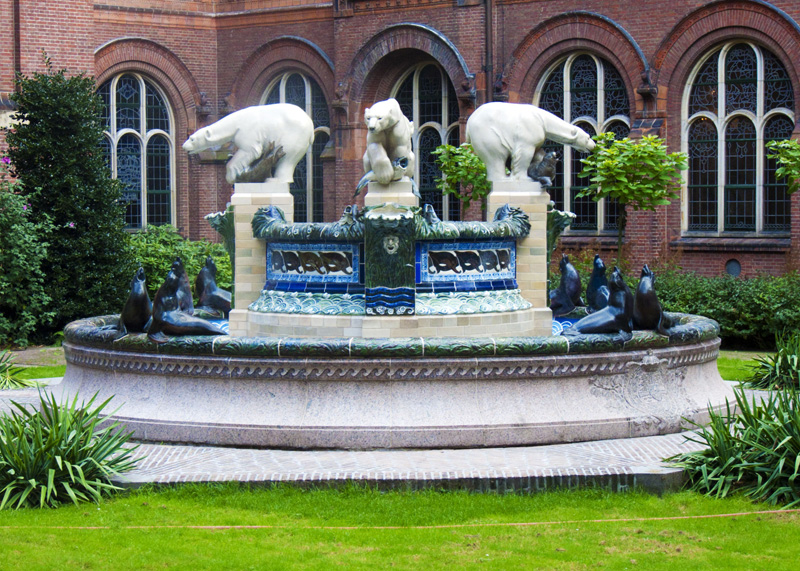
Krog's Polar Bear Fountain in front of the Peace Palace in The Hague

After Aluminia's acquisition of the Royal Copenhagen Porcelain Manufactury in 1882, its director, Philip Schou (1838–1922), was looking for someone who could revive the stagnating company artistically. In 1884 he asked the xylographer Frederik Hendriksen for advice on the matter and he proposed Krog as a possible candidate for the job. Krog was hired on a trial basis in October 1884 and was appointed to artistic director of the company on a permanent basis in January 1885.

Krog introduced a new style with inspiration from Japanese porcelain and nature. His achievements won recognition at the Nordic Exhibition of 1888 in Copenhagen and international attention at the 1891 General Land Centennial Exhibition in Paris where the company won the grand prix. It was also for the Nordic Exhibition 1888 that Arnold Krog introduced the first underglazed memorial plate from Royal Copenhagen, which would become the inspiration for the later Danish Christmas plates.

== Furniture, and silver ==
Krog has also designed silver, for instance for A. Michelsen. He has also designed furniture and bookbinding.

== Memberships and awards ==
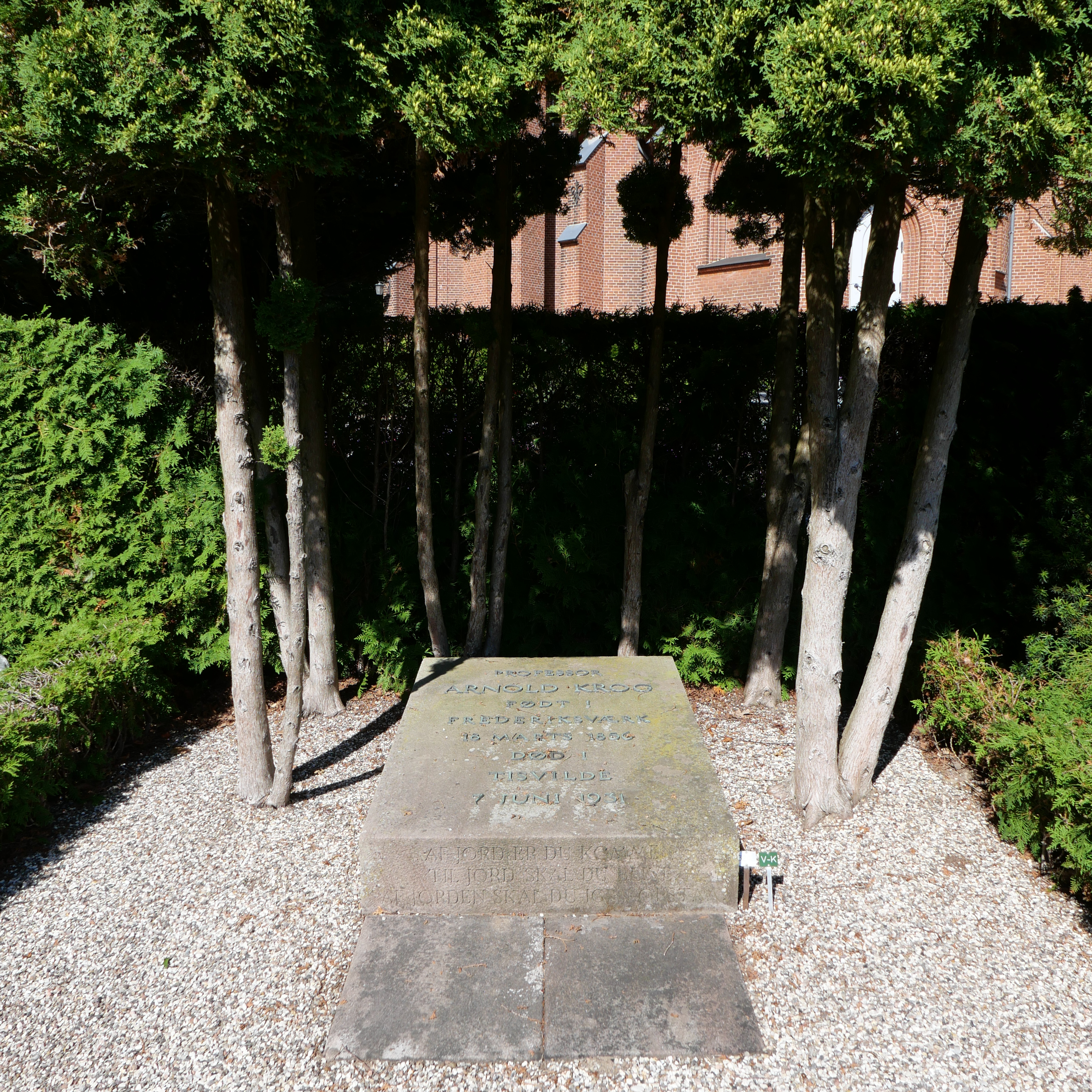
Krog's grave

He became a member of the academy's plenary session in 1911 and he was a member of the academy council from February 1911 to February 1919. He was appointed Knight of the Order of the Dannebrog in 1890 and a titular professor in 1892.

== Painting ==
Late in his life, he took up landscape painting and etching. He held a solo exhibitions at Kleis' gallery in Østergade in 1919 and 1923. He was represented at the Charlottenborg Spring Exhibition in 1887, 1891, 1916, 1919–21 and 1923.

== Personal life ==
Krog was married to Euphemia Magdalene Henningsen on 8 September 1882 in Hvedstrup Church. She was a sister of the painters Frants Henningsen and Erik Henningsen. They lived in Tisvildeleje after his retirement. He died on 7 June 1931 and was buried in Vinderød Cemetery.

== See also ==
- Gundorph Albertus
- Henning Koppel
