= A. Michelsen =

Danish Jeweller (1841)

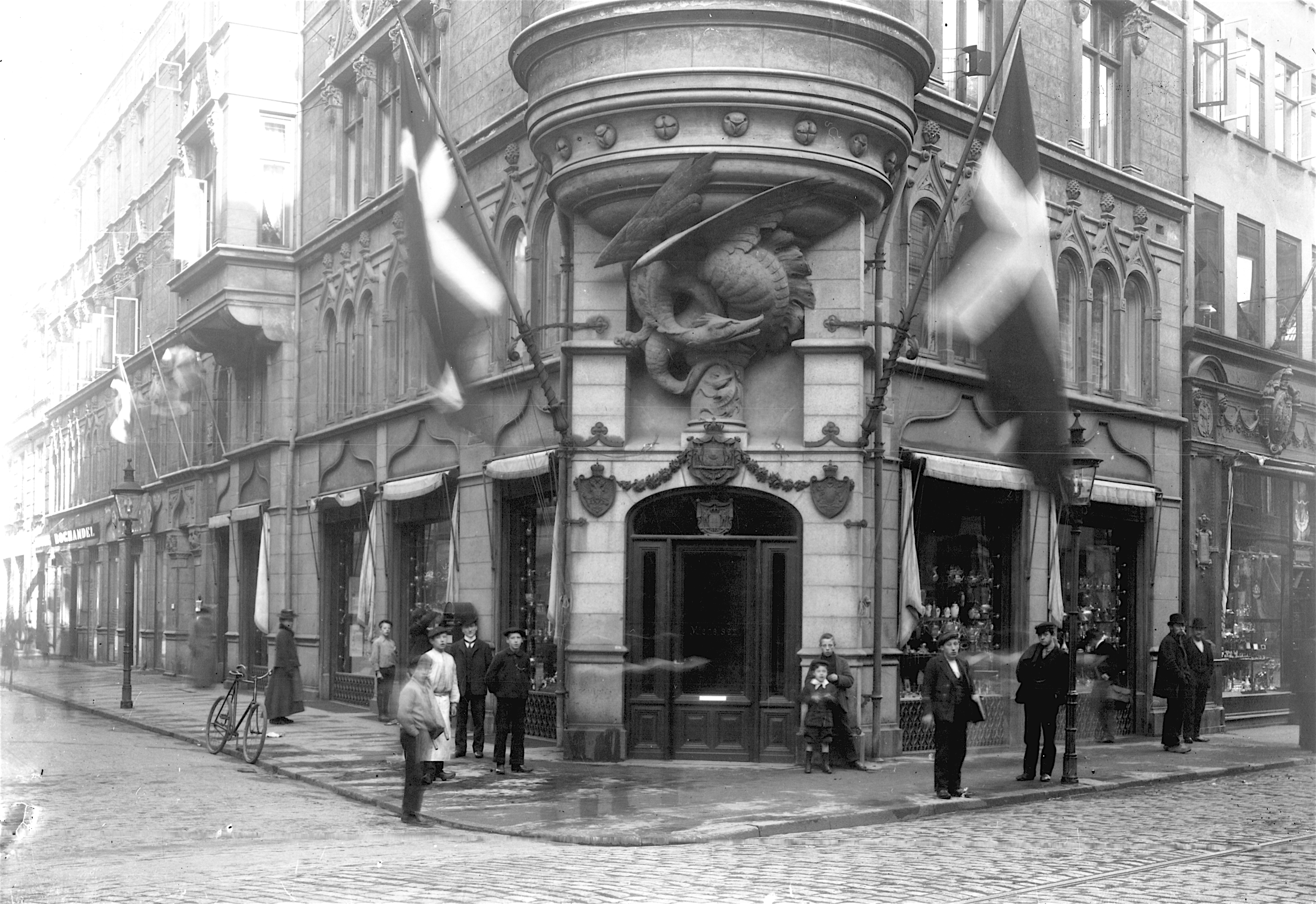
The shop at Bredgade 11 in Copenhagen

A. Michelsen was a leading Danish jeweller founded in 1841 by Anton Michelsen in Copenhagen. It was responsible for executing all Danish orders. It was absorbed by Georg Jensen A/S in 1985.

== History ==
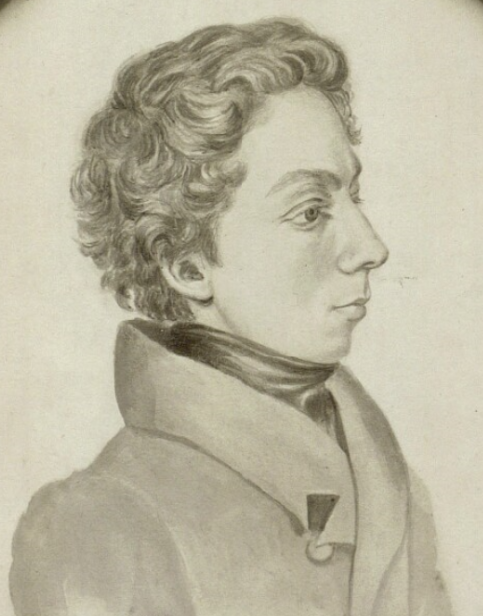
Anton Michelsen

Anton Michelsen (1809–1877) was born in 1809 in Copenhagen. His family, which can be traced back to the 17th century, had for generations been metalsmiths. He completed a goldsmith's apprenticeship in Odense in 1839 before moving to Copenhagen, where he continued his training in Dyrkoph's and court goldsmith J.B. Dalhoff's workshops. He also attended the Royal Danish Academy of Fine Arts, where he was influenced by Gustav Friedrich Hetsch. In 1836, he went on a long journey abroad, working in some of the leading goldsmiths' workshops in Germany and Paris. He established his own goldsmithy in Gothersgade in Copenhagen when he returned to Denmark in 1841. He immediately attracted the attention of the royal family. Christian VIII charged him with executing all Danish medals and granted him the title of royal court and order jeweller (kgl. hof- og ordensjuvelerer). Michelsen was the only Danish goldsmith who was represented at the Exposition Universelle in Paris in 1855. In 1900, he was the only Danish jeweller to exhibit silver during the Paris Exposition.

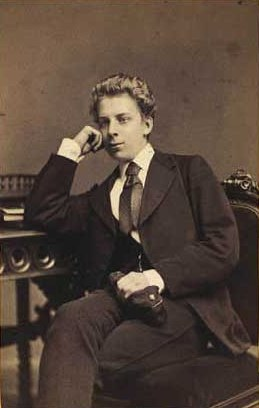
Carl Michelsen

Michelsen's son Carl Michelsen (1853–1921), a jurist and merchant, continued the company when his father died in 1877. He collaborated with artists such as Arnold Krog, Harald Slott-Møller, Hans Tegner, Martin Nyrop and especially Thorvald Bindesbøll. Carl Michelsen served for a time as president of Industriforeningen and was the first chairman of the Museum of Arts and Crafts. His son, Poul Ulrich Michelsen (1881–1957), joined the company as a partner in 1914. He had received a commercial education at Landmandsbanken and continued the company alone when his father died in 1921. The artists with whom he collaborated included Svend Hammershøi, Ib Lunding, Olaf Stæhr-Nielsen, Palle Suenson and Arne Bang. The most important works from the period were created in the years after 1925 to designs by professor Kay Fisker. Later collaborators included Ole Hagen, Erik Herløw and Edvard Kindt-Larsen.

Poul Ulrich Michelsen was appointed Commander of the Order of the Dannebrog in connection with the company's one-hundredth anniversary in 1941, and the Danish Museum of Arts and Crafts arranged a retrospective exhibition.

Poul Michelsen's son, Jørgen Michelsen (born 1912), an art historian and silversmith, joined the company in 1940 and became a partner in 1943. A Swedish subsidiary, AB A. Michelsen, Stockholm, was established in 1946.

In 1985, A. Michelsen was merged with the Royal Porcelain Factory, Holmegaard Glasværk and Georg Jensen under the name Royal Copenhagen.

== Location ==
Anton Michelsen's workshop was originally located in Gothersgade. The company later established a factory at Sturlasgade 14 in Islands Brygge while its shop was situated at Bredgade 11.

== Works ==
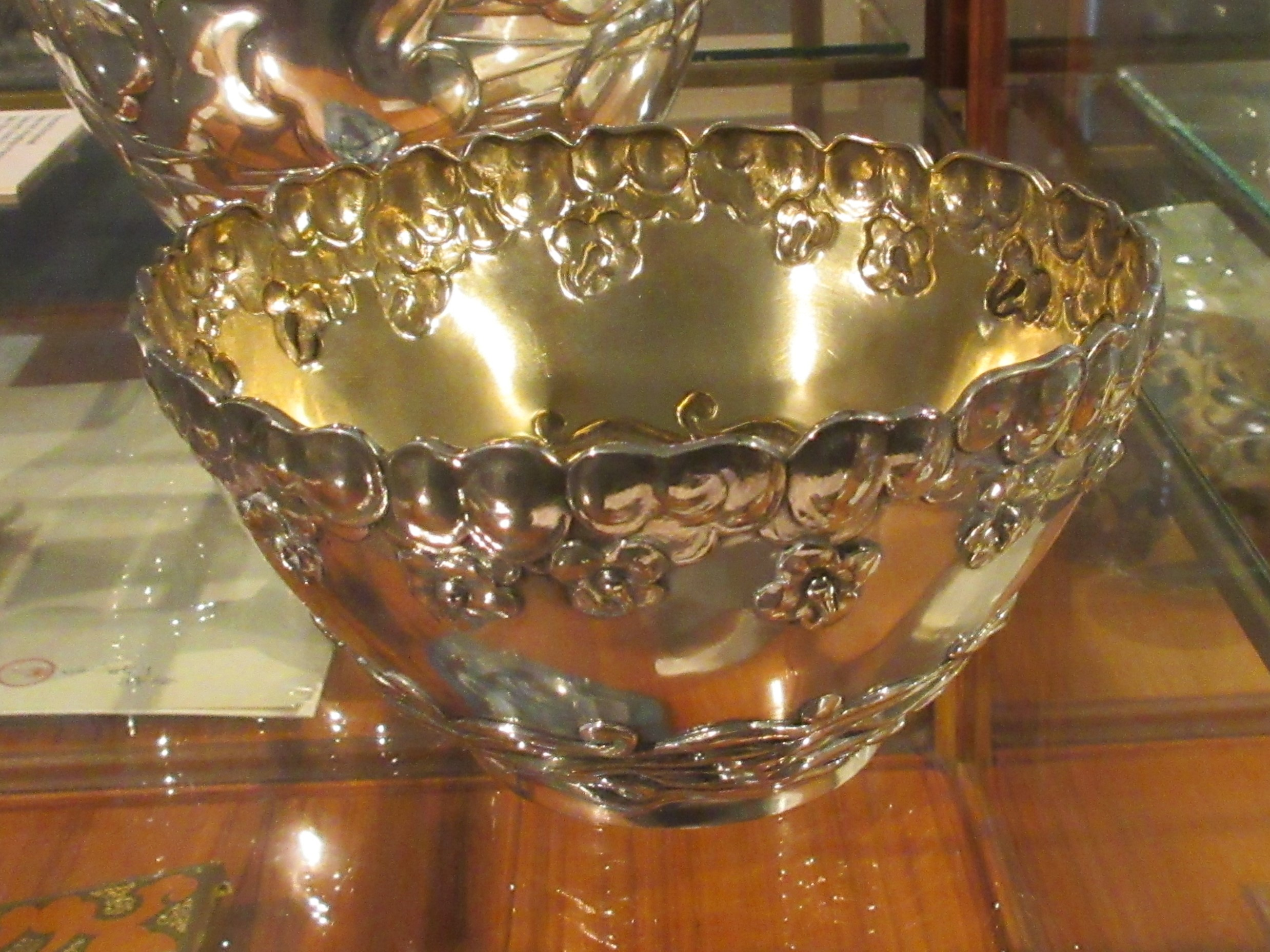
Candy bowl in silver designed for A. Michelsen by Thorvald Bindesbøll

Anton Michelsen was one of the first to work in the so-called Old Nordic style.
