= Harald Christian Nielsen =

Danish designer

Harald Nielsen
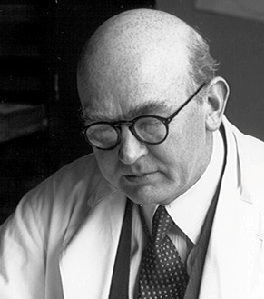
- Born: 20 July 1892; Bårse, Denmark
- Died: 22 December 1977 (aged 85); Hellerup, Denmark
- Occupation: Silver designer

Harald Nielsen (20 July 1892 – 22 December 1977) was a Danish designer of silver for Georg Jensen. The younger brother of Georg Jensen's third wife, he joined the company at 17 as a chaser's apprentice but later became one of the company's leading designers in the 1920s and 1930s and Jensen's closest colleague. One of his most well-known designs being the pyramid flatware pattern. In the early 1950s he headed the company's apprentice school and in 1958 became its artistic director.

== Early life ==
Nielsen was born in Bårse, Vordingborg Municipality, the youngest child of parish priest Søren Nielsen and Lydia Kold. His father died when he was just one year old and his mother then moved the family to Copenhagen. He had aspirations to become a painter but the family's difficult economic situation did not allow it. His eldest sister, Johanne, married Georg Jensen in 1907. In 1909, Nielsen began an apprenticeship as a chaser in his brother-in-law's silver workshop. The company paid for his drawing lessons with Carl V. Meyer.

== Career ==
Still an apprentice, Nielsen created the drawings for one of the workshop's catalogues. He briefly made another attempt to become a painter but was shortly thereafter once again employed by Georg Jensen, creating drawings based on Jensen's and Johan Rohde's sketches for the silversmiths to work after. He also began to create his own designs, developing his own style.

He received the K. A. Larssens Legat in 1921. He was appointed to deputy director of the company in 1958. He retired in 1962 but remained an artistic consultant until 1967.

== Works ==
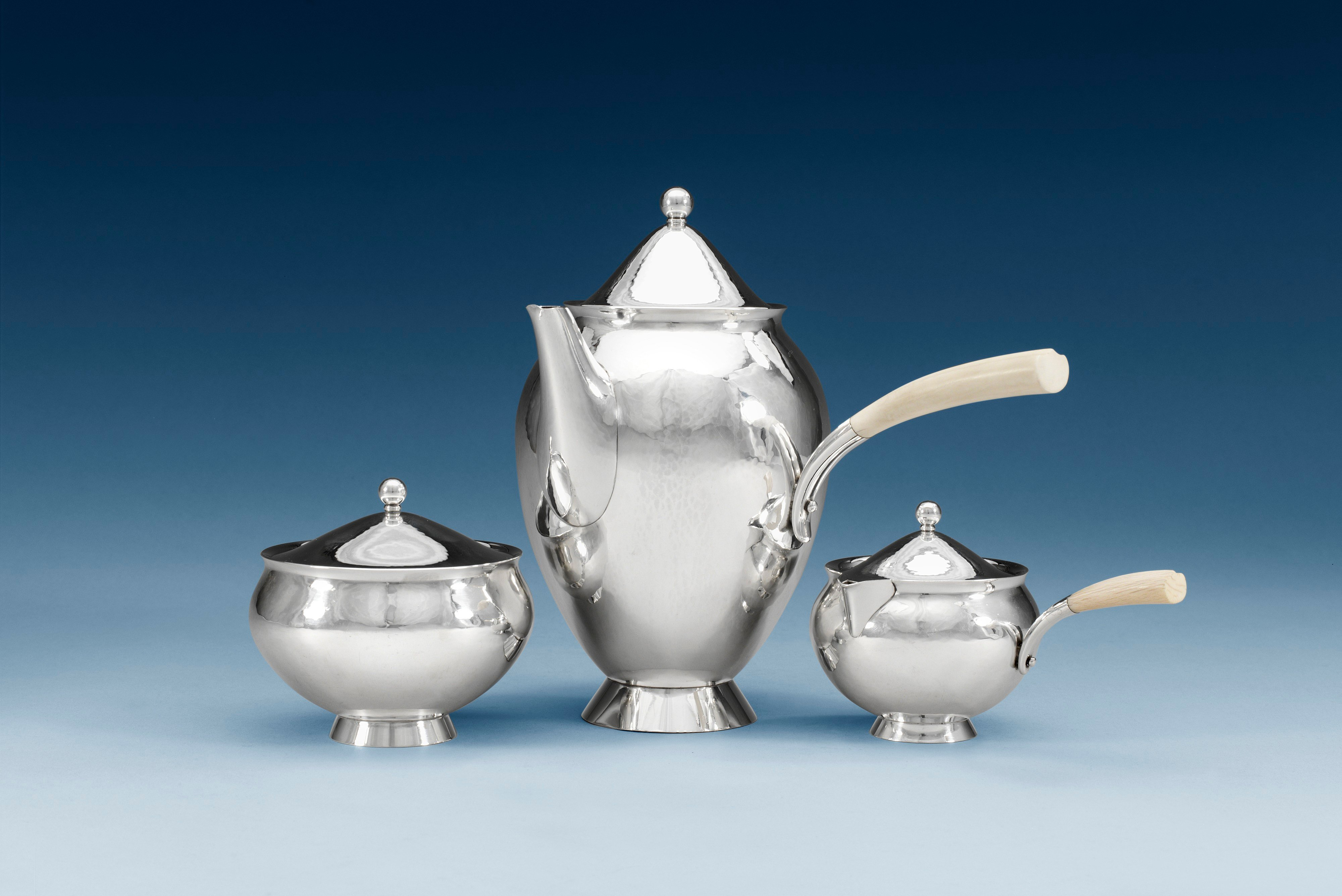
Silver by Harald Nielsen

Nielsen mostly designed hollow ware. His works are well-proportioned and characterized by a refined sense of style.

He also designed two sets of cutlery, Pyramid (1927–29) and Dobbeltriflet (1947) as well as a few pieces of jewellery.

== Exhibition ==
His works were part of Georg Jensen's contribution to the International Exhibition of Modern Decorative and Industrial Arts in Paris in 1925 and he was also represented at all other Georg Jensen exhibitions over the next decades. His 60 years birthday in 1932 was celebrated with a special exhibition at Georg Jensen & Wendel in Copenhagen.

Nielsen's works are represented in the collections of the Danish Design Museum as well as several international museums.

== See also ==
- Erik Magnussen
