= Raadvad =

- Village
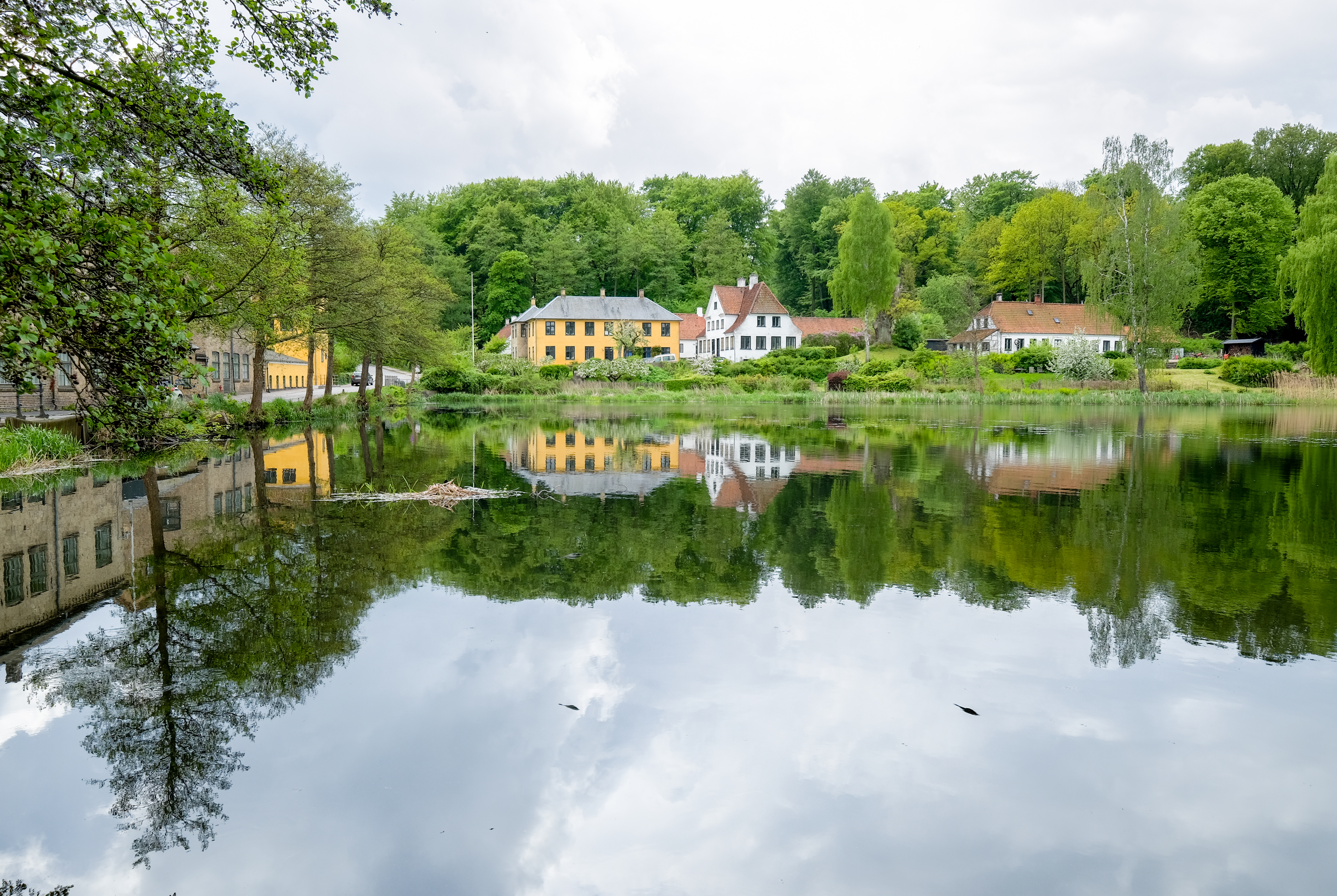
- Raadvad

- Location in the Capital Region of Denmark
- Coordinates: 55°48′19″N 12°33′34″E
- Country: Denmark
- Region: Capital Region
- Municipality: Lyngby-Taarbæk
- Time zone: UTC+1 (CET)
  - Summer (DST): UTC+2 (CEST)

Raadvad, or Rådvad is a former industrial development located on both sides of the Mølleåen river which at this point marks the border between Lyngby-Taarbæk and Rudersdal municipalities in the northern suburbs of Copenhagen, Denmark. It was built around a watermill in the second half of the 18th century and has given name to a well-known Danish brand of knives and other kitchen equipment. The buildings are now all heritage listed. They include Raadvad Kro from 1861 and a hostel based in a former school from 1894. Other buildings include a centre for building conservation and a local nature school.

== History ==
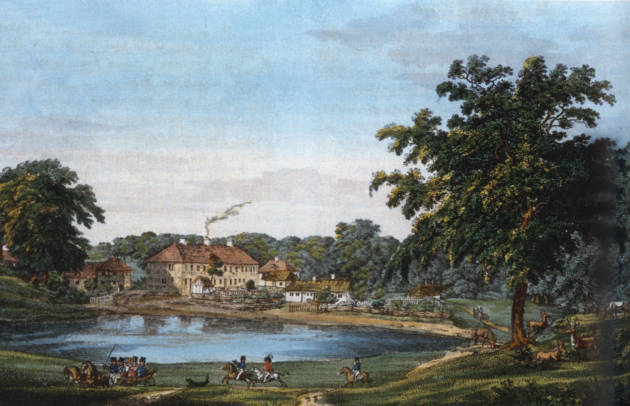
Raadvad painted by Heinrich Gustav Ferdinand Holm in the middle of the 19th century

On 30 April 1643, Christian Alckenbrecht obtained a royal license to build the first watermill at the site. Four years later he ran three waterworks at the site: A sharpening mill, a hammer mill and a fulling mill. The installations were destroyed by Swedish soldiers in 1658 but reopened in 1664, now as a gunpowder and sharpening mill. In 1671, the king took over ownership of the premises which a few years earlier had been included in the Royal Deer Garden. The site was from then on exclusively used for the manufacture of gunpowder until 1869 when the activities moved to Frederiksværk.

Raadvad was then gifted by king Frederick V to his servant Nicolai Jacob Jessen. He expanded the complex and operated a flour mill at the site but went bankrupt in 1765. Raadvad was then taken over by the Iron Mongers' Guild in Copenhagen. They founded Raadvaddams Fabrikker at the site, producing mostly kitchen equipment.

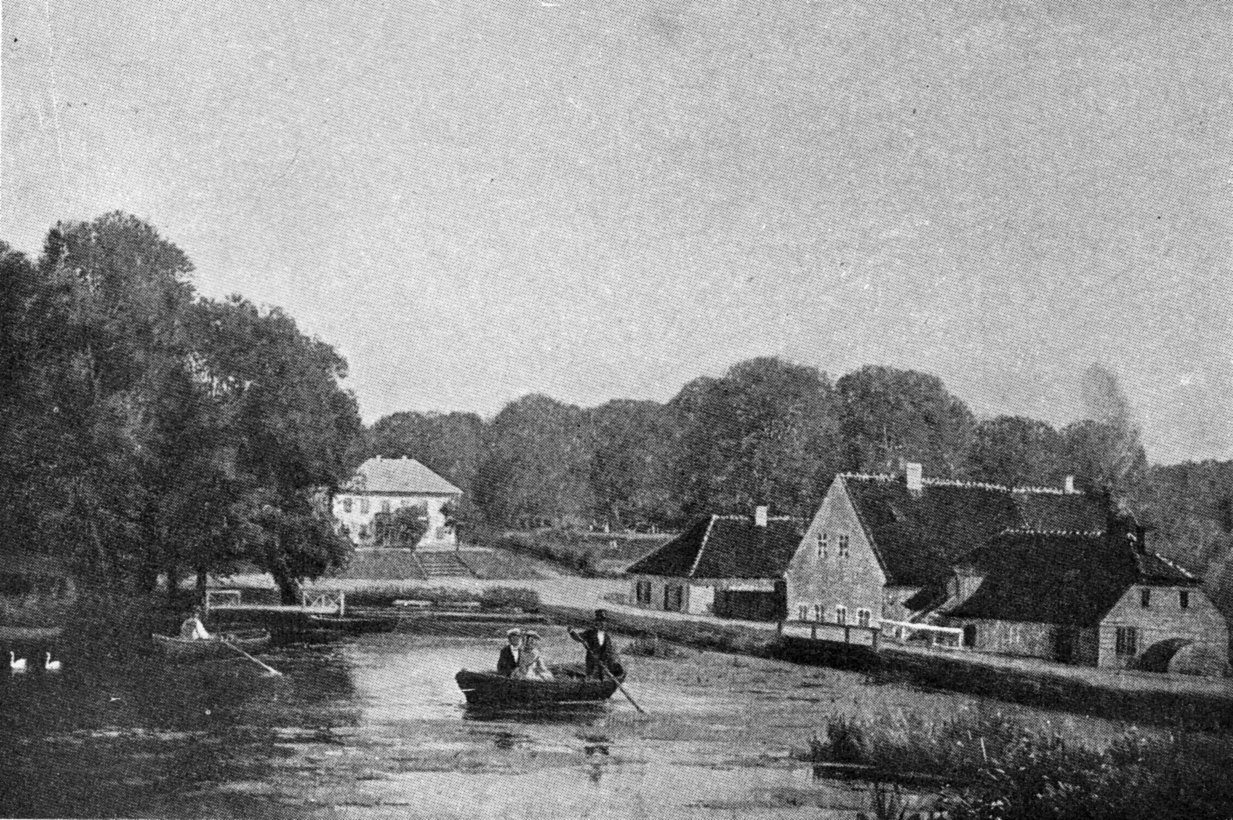
Raadvad in 1872, painting by Anders Andersen-Lundby

Raadvad Kro ("Raadvad Inn") opened on 27 December 1861 to supplement the income from the factory which experienced a difficult period. With its proximity to Copenhagen and scenic surroundings in the middle of the forest, it was an instant success. The guests included members of the royal family who sometimes lunched there in connection with hunts. However, when the Coast Line opened in 1897, people started to venture further up the coast and in 1916 Raadvad Kro had to close. It was then for a while used as headquarters of the knife factory but reopened as an inn in 1930.

After the First World War, the company changed its name to Raadvads Knivfabrikker and, for a period, it produced exclusively knives and bread-cutters. In the 1970s, the company moved to Brønderslev, and is now a part of the Fiskars group.

The Ministry of Environment took over the abandoned buildings and let them to Håndværksrådet in 1981. In 1986, they went through a major refurbishment.

== Notable buildings ==
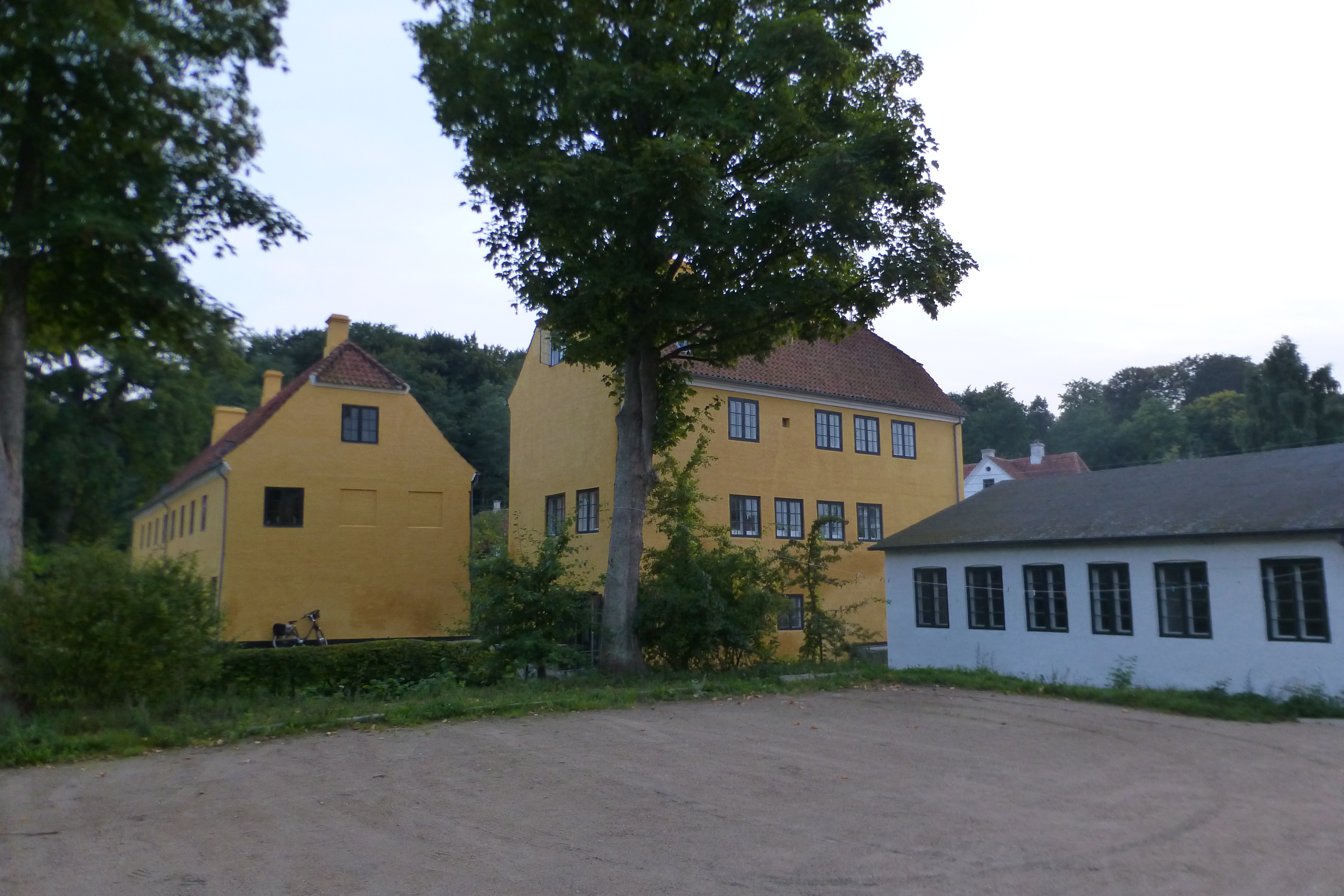
Raadvad

The development comprises 19 listed buildings on the south side of Mølleåen (in Lyngby–Taarbæk Municipality) and six buildings on its north side (in Rudersdal Municipality).

The buildings on the south bank include Damhuset, the Inspector's House (c. 1770); Kildehuset (before 1779); Fileværket (before 1779); the forge (Smedien, 1805); Længen (between 1835 and 1846); Egehuset, the first school (before 1835); Møllehuset (c. 1846); four residential blocks (1917–18). A new school was built on the top of a small hill in 1918–19 to a Historicist design by Harald Lønborg-Jensen. It is now operated as a hostel under the name Raadvad Vandrehjem.

The buildings on the north side include the main factory building from 1879.

== Today ==
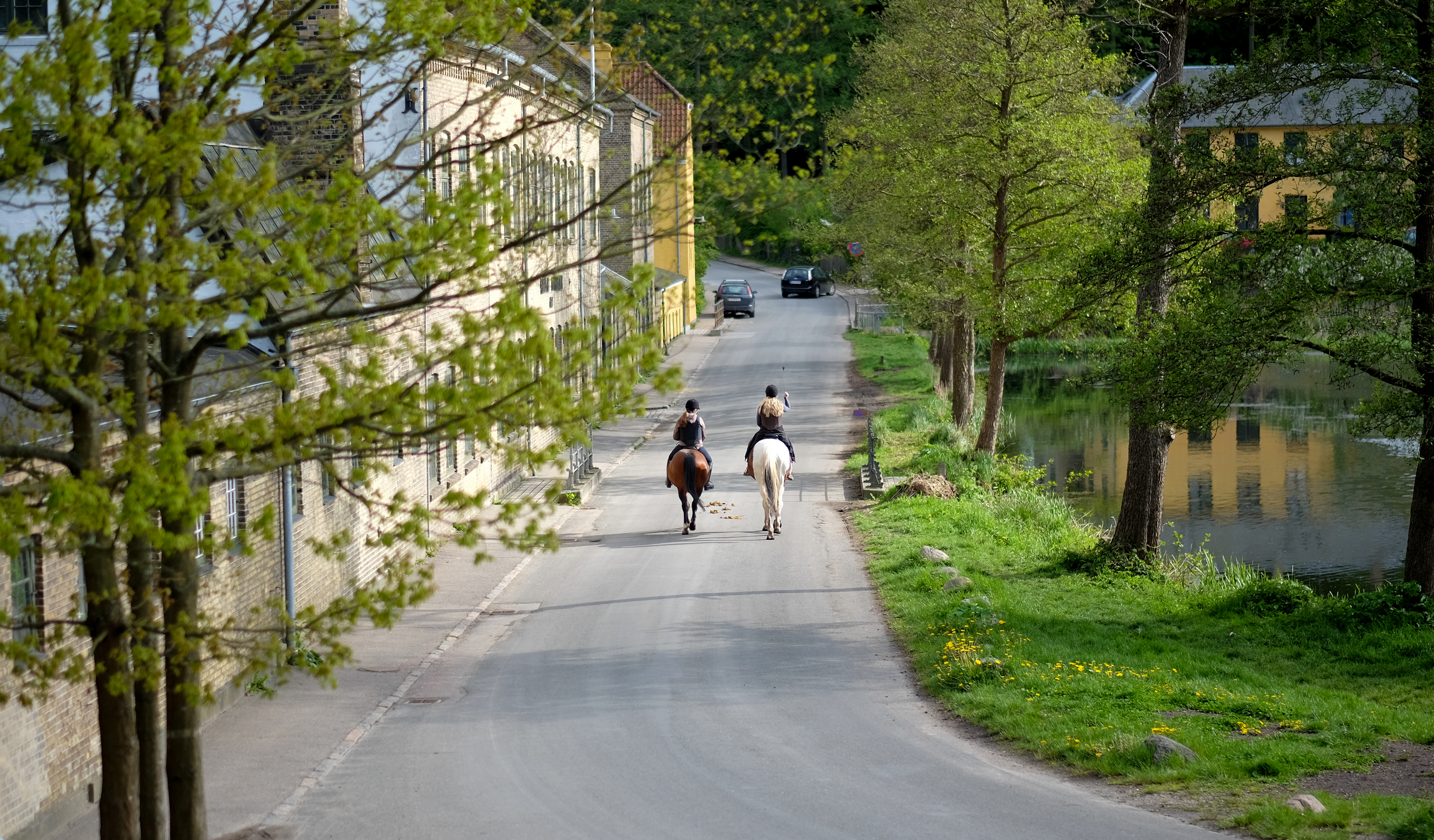
Horseback riding at Raadvad

Today some of the buildings house Center for Bygningsbevaring, a centre for building conservation and the preservation of traditional crafts.

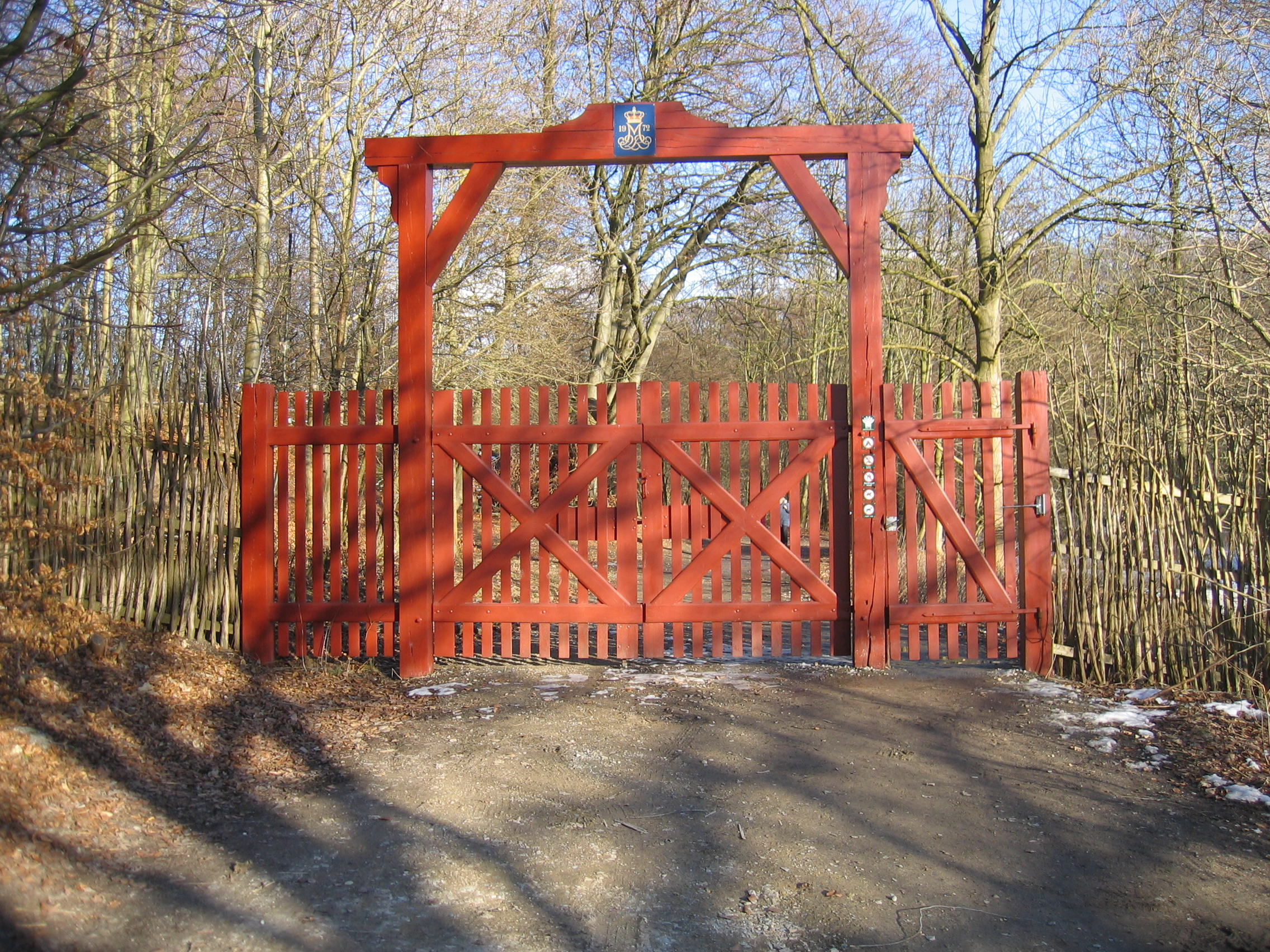
The Raadvad Gate to Jægersborg Dyrehave

Other buildings are home to Radvad Nature School, a collaboration between Lyngby-Taarbæk, Rundersdal and Gentofte municipalities and the Danish Nature Agency's local department (Naturstyrelsen Hovedstaden). Raadvad Kro is a restaurant which also hosts meetings and other events. The former school now houses a hostel, Lyngby Danhostel.

Raadvad is also the site of one of the red-painted entrance gates to Jægersborg Dyrehave.

== Notable persons ==
- Georg Jensen (1866 – 1935), Danish silversmith and founder of Georg Jensen A/S
- Axel Lind (Danish Wiki) (1907 in Rådvad – 2011), painter
