= Christian Thomsen (sculptor) =

Danish sculptor (1860–1921)

Christian Thomsen (1860–1921) was a Danish sculptor. He was employed at the Royal Porcelain Manufactory Royal Copenhagen from 1898, and is considered one of the most influential royal Danish sculptors of the 20th century. He produced over 100 figurines, including figures from Hans Christian Andersen's fairy tales, animals, and 36 commemorative plaques; Thomsen was the one who produced the Danish Christmas plates in 1908.
