= Ib Georg Jensen =

Danish ceramist (1927–2021)

- Born: 5 August 1927; Hellerup, Denmark
- Died: 25 May 2021 (aged 93); Lindely, Hellerup, Denmark

Ib Georg Jensen (5 August 1927 – 25 May 2021) was a Danish ceramist, designer and author by the alias 'Muk'.

He was the youngest child of Danish silversmith and designer Georg Arthur Jensen (1866–1935) and his wife Magdalene Hanna Agnes Christiansen (1888–1966).

Ib Georg Jensen trained as a potter at Herman A. Kähler ceramics in 1947, and followed much in his father's footsteps, opening his own pottery shop, Muk Pottery, adopted from a childhood pseudonym, in 1949. Soon after he joined Den Permanente and Danish Crafts, displaying his works alongside many other notable designers and craftsmen. Later on he would work for the Georg Jensen Silversmithy for a brief period of time and later move on to Gero in the Netherlands where he would design their modern style of flatware and cutlery. He then returned in 1962 to Denmark where he opened up a new pottery workshop and began to produce in addition to bowls, plates and other tableware, teapots, jewelry, and even flower pots. The teapots would later be featured in an exhibit, “Teapots and Light” as well as a secondary feature of his silver jewelry designs, manufactured by Thor Selzer at Den Permanente. He then moved on to design more stoneware lines which were very comprehensive, spanning from roasting pans to egg dishes, and a few years later became development manager for Bing & Grøndahl.

His vast experience with pottery has led him to write a number of books on the subject, including "Pottemagerens håndbog" (The ceramists handbook) and on the subject of his father, "Der var engang en sølvsmed – Historien om min far Georg Jensen" (Once there were a silversmith – the story of my father).

The subject of his father has always been dear to his heart. In 2004 he had helped to organize the exhibition “The Unknown Georg Jensen” and was involved in the previous signature dispute with the Georg Jensen Silversmithy. Ib Georg Jensen's primary dispute with the firm has been primarily a heartfelt concern about his father's image and rich history, and he has desired to uphold the Georg Jensen name and the quality and artistic beauty. He has also been known to state his distress at the Georg Jensen name being attached to “all sorts of small items” and odd items not affiliated with his father's work. The dispute with Georg Jensen Silversmithy resulted in a mutual understanding and respect which lasted and with the dispute behind him, he remained happy and cheerful with his own family and his memories and continued his quest to promote his father's work through “The Georg Jensen Society”, a group that is unaffiliated with the Silversmithy and founded in 2000, as well as the “Georg Jensen Magazine”.

His work was exhibited in 2008 at Designmuseum Danmark in Copenhagen, Denmark and again in 2016 at Sophienholm, an exhibition hall in Lyngby-Taarbæk outside Copenhagen, as part of the “GEORG JENSEN – 150 ÅR” (Georg Jensen - 150 years). His work was show latest in 2017 at Galleri Alfio Bonanno in Rudkøbing, Langeland in Denmark.

== CV ==
- Trained at Herman Kähler’s ceramics workshop in the city of Næstved, Denmark.
- Muk Pottery, workshop in Birkerød, Denmark
- Designer at Gero in the Netherlands. Designed the Gero Zilvium 90 silver-plated cutlery series as well as cutlery for KLM.
- Pottery workshop on Langeland, Denmark
- Designer at Bing & Grøndahl, Denmark
- Pottery workshop in Copenhagen, Denmark

== Exhibitions ==
Latest exhibitions:

2008, Designmuseum Danmark (at that time named the Danish Museum of Art & Design or in Danish: Kunstindustrimuseet). Designmuseum Danmark is Denmark's largest museum for Danish and international design.

2016, Sophienholm (an exhibition hall, owned by Lyngby-Taarbæk town council in Denmark) as part of the “GEORG JENSEN – 150 ÅR” (Georg Jensen - 150 years) exhibited between 9 July – 4 September 2016

2017, Galleri Alfio Bonanno in Rudkøbing, Langeland

== Books ==
Jensen is the author of the following books:

- "Pottemagerens håndbog" (The ceramists handbook). Published in Danish by publishing house Politiken in 1979. ISBN 87-567-3156-6, 160 pages. Photos by Søren Wesseltoft. Also published in Swedish in 1982, titled ”Keramik från början” ISBN 91-534-0683-4
- "Der var engang en sølvsmed – Historien om min far Georg Jensen" (Once there were a silversmith – the story of my father). Published in Danish by publishing house Aschehoug, Denmark, in 1999 (1st Edition) ISBN 9788755334410, 227 pages. Also published in Danish by publishing house Forum (Forlaget Forum), Denmark, in 2004 (2nd Edition) ISBN 9788755334410, 227 pages. Photos by Gine Georg Jensen, Anders Carøe, Michael Larsen among others.
- "Ib Georg Jensen – retrospektivt". Published in Danish by Kunstindustrimuseet (Danish Museum of Art & Design, today called 'Designmuseum Danmark') in 2007, 40 pages. Editor: Liv Carøe, Text: Hannah Georg Jensen, Photos by Anders Carøe & Michael Larsen
