= Hippopotamus service =

Dinner service made by the Royal Copenhagen Porcelain Manufactory

The Hippopotamus Service is a hand-painted 144 piece dinner service commissioned by the American porcelain collector Richard Baron Cohen from the Royal Copenhagen Porcelain Manufactory, and completed in 2006. The porcelain service features different views of hippopotamuses based on photographs of over 275 hippos taken in zoos all around the world. Cohen commissioned photographer Sarah Louise Galbraith to travel to 101 zoos in 33 countries and photograph the animals. Featured hippos included Penelope from the Louisiana Purchase Gardens and Zoo in Monroe, Louisiana. The service was first exhibited at Sotheby's New York City galleries in September 2006. It has subsequently been exhibited at the Charlottenburg Palace in Berlin, and the Liechtenstein Museum in Vienna.

Other famous services themed and named after animals include the Meissen porcelain Swan Service, and the Wedgwood Frog Service commissioned by Empress Catherine the Great of Russia.
