= Danish Christmas plates =

Collectible porcelain plates made in Denmark

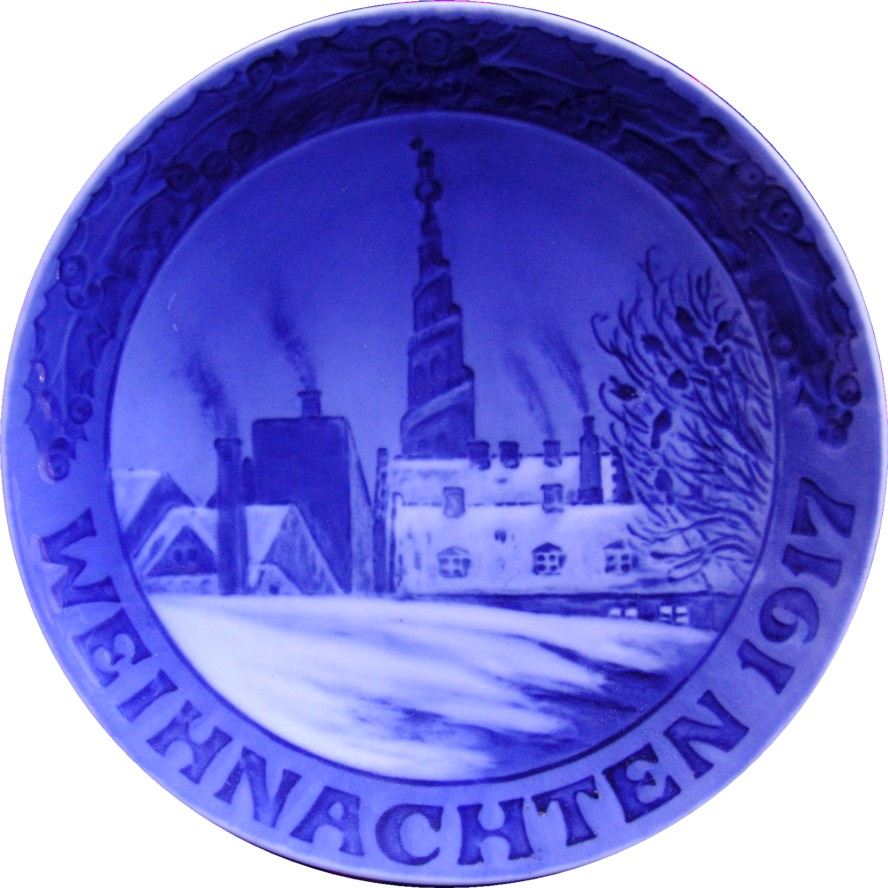
Christmas plate manufactured by Royal Copenhagen for the year 1917.

Danish Christmas plates are collectibles which are issued annually by porcelain manufacturers in Denmark. The first annual Christmas plate was produced by Bing & Grøndahl in 1895, with Royal Copenhagen following suit in 1908. Blue and white in color, and bearing the year of issuance, the mold is discontinued after Christmas Eve.

== History ==
The first Christmas plate was issued by Bing & Grøndahl in 1895. Harald Bing came up with the idea, hoping to develop a series with Danish scenes. Designed by Frans August Hallin (1865–1947), the first plate is titled Bag den Frosne Rude (Behind the Frosted Pane) with a view of some of Copenhagen's landmark buildings at night as seen through the icy windows of Frederiksberg Palace. Hallin was a Swede who came to Copenhagen in 1885. He also designed the plates for 1896 and 1897 and later became the company's deputy director.

When Royal Copenhagen began its own series in 1908, its first plate Maria med Barnet (Mary with the Child) was designed by Christian Thomsen (1860–1921), a sculptor who joined the factory in 1898. The simple yet modern-looking style of the factory's plates began in 1888 when Royal Copenhagen (then Den Kongelige Porcelainsfabrik) designed a series of plates with its well-known logo of three waves and a royal crown, all in blue. Crown Princess Louise liked them so much that she immediately bought one. The news spread quickly, causing people to rush out to buy them.

== Designs ==
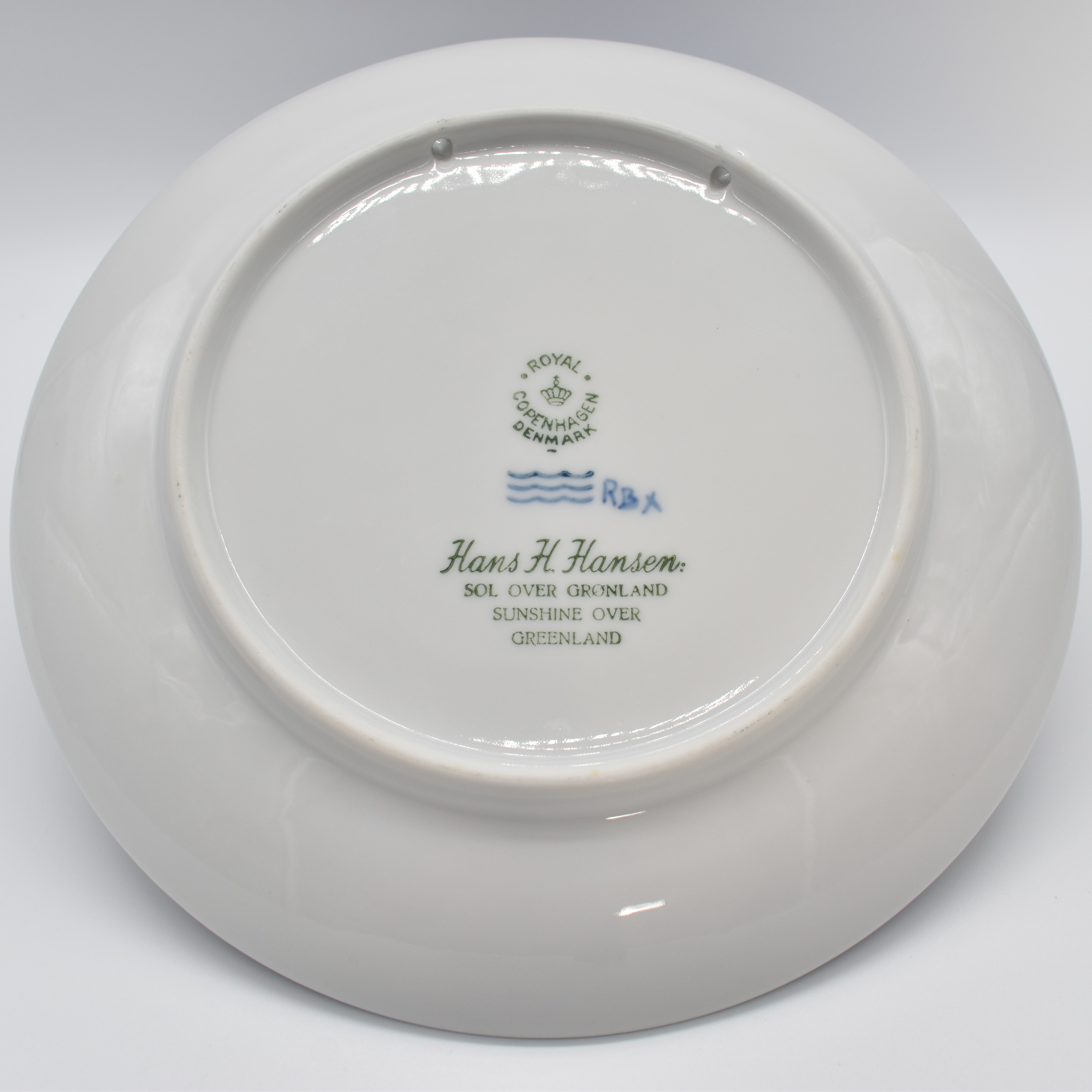
The underside of Royal Copenhagen's 1958 Christmas Plate showing the factory markings and pre-drilled holes meant for hanging the plates on walls.

The design of Royal Copenhagen's first Christmas plate in 1908 was the result of a competition which produced quite a variety of scenes. Thereafter, different artists were invited to provide subjects for the plates, often on the basis of current events. In 1935, for example, the recently completed Little Belt Bridge was shown. One of the best known subjects is a kneeling angel which, in 1945, symbolized a thankful prayer from those who had survived the war. Other well-known symbols of Denmark which have appeared include The Little Mermaid and Tivoli's Pantomime Theatre. Hans Christian Andersen's childhood home appeared in 2005 on the occasion of the author's 200th anniversary.

Christmas plates are produced using a special technique known as Danish underglaze. On the basis of the artist's drawing, the design is copied to a plaster mold from which the plates are produced. Each plate is individually painted with a blue underglaze after which it is glazed and fired.

== See also ==
- Royal Copenhagen 2010 plaquettes
