= Yuki Ferdinandsen =

Japanese-Danish silversmith

Yuki Ferdinandsen (born 1958) is a Japanese-Danish silversmith who combines influences from Modern Danish Design with the Japanese arare technique.

== Biography ==
Ferdinandsen was born and raised in Kyoto. She received her first training as a silversmith in her home town, first at Saga Junior College of Art (1979) and then at Tsuibu Metal Art School (1882). In 1988, she moved to Denmark. In 1988 and again in 1997–1999, she studied at the Goldsmith High School in Hellerup.

She later worked for Georg Jensen before establishing her own studio in Copenhagen. She has exhibited throughout Europe and Japan.

== Works ==
Her work is represented in a wide range of public and private collections, including those of the Danish Design Museum, National Museum of Sweden (Stockholm) Nordensfjeldske Kunstindustrimuseum (Trondhjem), Koldinghus (Kolding) and the Danish Art Foundation.

== Awards ==
In 2012, Ferdinandsen received the Jarl Gustav Hansen Award. In 2015, she was awarded the Schoonhoven Silver Award.
