= Georg Jensen A/S =

Danish designer company with a focus on silverware

- Type: Subsidiary
- Industry: Luxury goods
- Founded: 19 April 1904; 122 years ago in Copenhagen, Denmark
- Founder: Georg Jensen
- Headquarters: Søndre Fasanvej 7, 2000 Frederiksberg, Denmark
- Key people: Hazem Ben-Gacem (chairman); Francesco Pesci (CEO)
- Parent: Fiskars (2023–present)
- Website: georgjensen.com

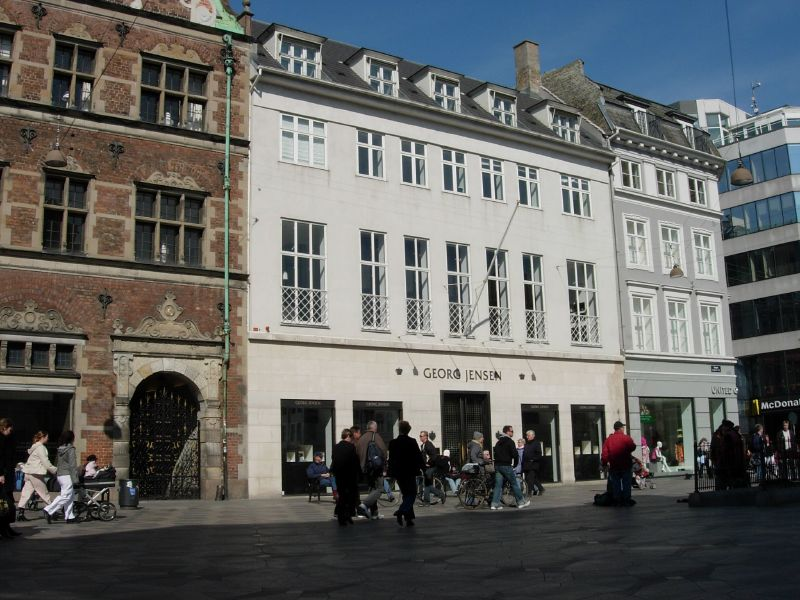
A Georg Jensen shop at Strøget, Copenhagen

Georg Jensen A/S (originally Georg Jensens Sølvsmedie A/S) is a Danish designer company with a focus on silverware. It was founded in 1904 by Danish silversmith Georg Jensen. In December 2023, the company was acquired by the Fiskars Group for 155 million euros.

== History ==
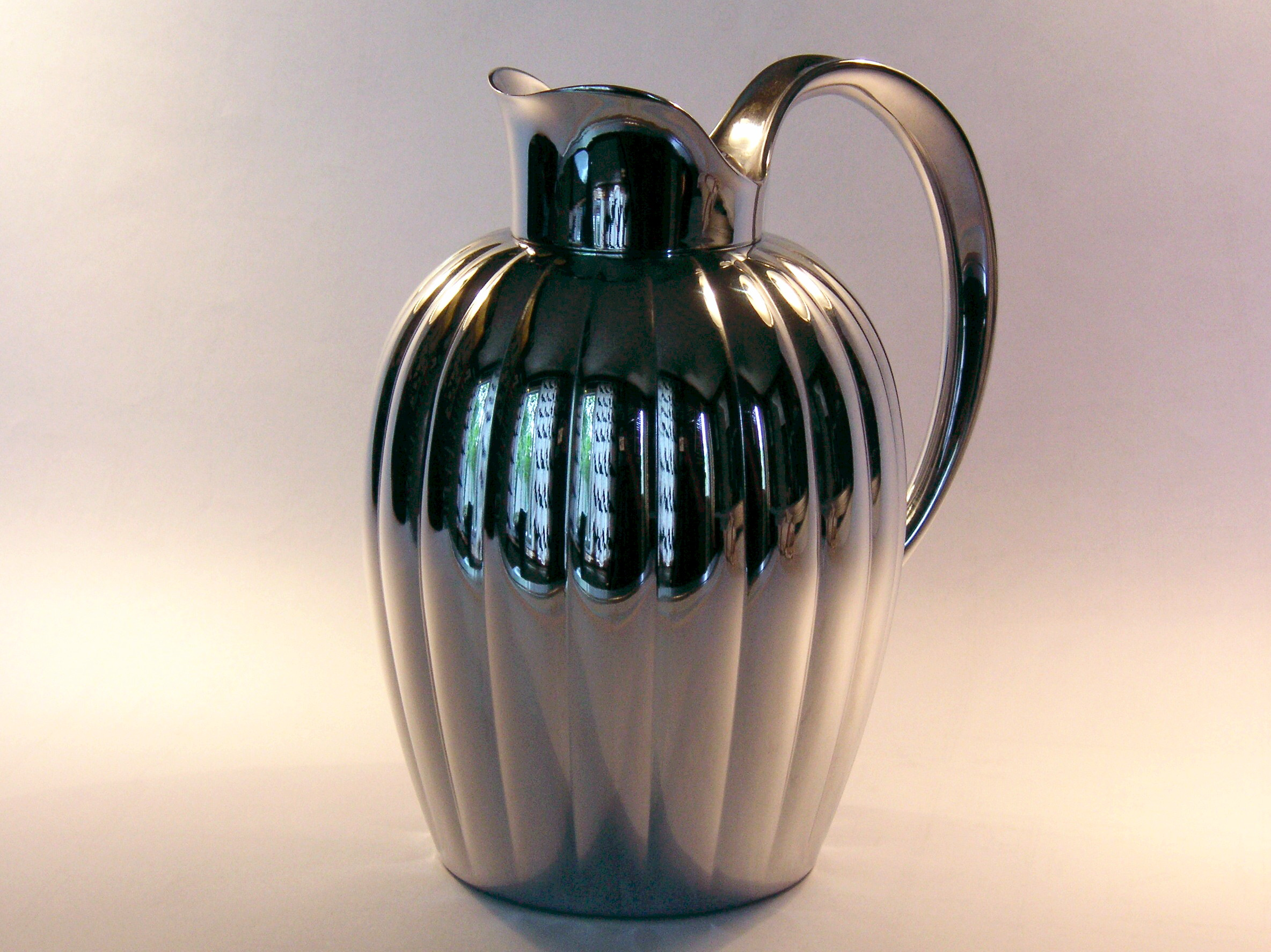
A Georg Jensen Thermos

After finishing at the Royal Academy of Fine Arts in 1892, Georg Jensen tried his hand at clay sculptures, before moving to the applied arts. He began as a modeller at the Bing & Grøndahl porcelain factory and, in 1898 he had small pottery workshop. In 1901, he abandoned ceramics and resumed work as a silversmith and designer with the master, Mogens Ballin. This led Jensen to make a landmark decision, when in 1904, he risked what small capital he had and opened his own little silversmithy at 36 Bredgade in Copenhagen.

In 1909, Jensen opened his first shop in Berlin, and the following year, he received a gold medal for the work he displayed at the International Exhibition in Brussels. In 1912, he opened a larger workshop and a larger retail shop in Copenhagen.

The company's Berlin store entered a period of financial trouble with the beginning of World War I. The company did, however, enjoy international success, winning the grand Prix at the 1915 world's fair, with William Randolph Hearst reportedly buying the whole exhibition.

By 1917, the business, also due to lack of silver during WWI, was suffering, and to rescue the business Georg Jensen asked help from his brother-in-law, Thorolf Møller, and one of his earliest important clients, Peder Anders Pedersen (1869–1937), who had made a fortune building the first power stations in Denmark. The two invested 440,000 crowns, topping it up two years later and taking the share capital of the company to 1.2 million crowns. P.A. Pedersen also took over the chairmanship, but the post-war years proved to be challenging, amid recession and bankruptcies, and as the business struggled, in 1924, Pedersen became the firm's managing director too. Georg Jensen would concentrate on the artistic side of the business, but probably felt his pride violated when control of the silversmith was thus lost. In 1925, Georg Jensen moved to Paris when he opened a branch of the silversmith, but the following year, he returned to Copenhagen and reconciled with P.A. Pedersen, continuing as its creative leader until he died in 1935.

Together with Thorolf Møller, P.A. Pedersen wanted to expand further, and in 1924 had financed the opening of a branch in New York. This was to become a very important branch, and its agent, Frederik Lunning (1881–1952) its indefatigable driver. He began displaying in the lobbies of the finest hotels in the city, and with orders flooding in, arguably helped save Georg Jensen from the crisis at home. It was Lunning who established the Georg Jensen store on 5th Avenue. Meanwhile, at the beginning of the 1930s, Pedersen established a metalware factory (PLATA), which could produce silverplated and steel products, something which Georg Jensen opposed, but was probably a necessity during the economic depression.

In 1931, P.A. Pedersen's son, Anders Hostrup-Pedersen (1902–1980) joined the company's management. In 1937, after his father's death, he took the role of managing director, a post he maintained until 1970. A. Hostrup Pedersen put his mark on the company's development particularly in the post-war years, attaching to the company's silversmith workshop a number of prominent artists, including Sigvard Bernadotte, Henning Koppel, Søren Georg Jensen, Magnus Stephensen and Nanna Ditzel, giving them ample freedoms to further the founder's high-quality standards and develop new styles. As a result, Georg Jensen's international standing became even more recognized. A. Hostrup-Pedersen was a great organizer and worked actively in several industry organizations, not just as board member of the Gold and Silverware Manufacturers' Association (Guld- og sølvvarefabrikantforeningen) and the Goldsmith's Joint Council (Guldsmedefagets fællesråd), but especially between 1958–1971 as chairman of the National Association of Arts and Crafts (Landsforeningen for kunsthåndværk). As the driving force behind a number of large exhibitions of Danish handicrafts abroad, such as in 1958 at the Louvre in Paris, in 1960 at the Metropolitan Museum of Arts in New York (1960) and in 1962 at the Victoria & Albert Museum in London, A. Hostrup Pedersen was able to also promote Georg Jensen abroad.

Royal Copenhagen purchased Georg Jensen in 1972 and merged it with Orrefors Kosta Boda, Boda-Nova Höganäs Keramik and the Venini, to create the Royal Scandinavia Group. In 2001, the private equity group Axcel Capital Partners bought Royal Scandinavia Group. In 2012, Investcorp acquired Georg Jensen from Axcel for US$140 million. In 2022, Prince Felix of Denmark became a model for the brand.

Fiskars acquired the company from Investcorp in 2023.

== See also ==
- Hans Christensen
- Harald Christian Nielsen
- Yuki Ferdinandsen
