= Georg Jensen =

Danish silversmith (1866–1935)

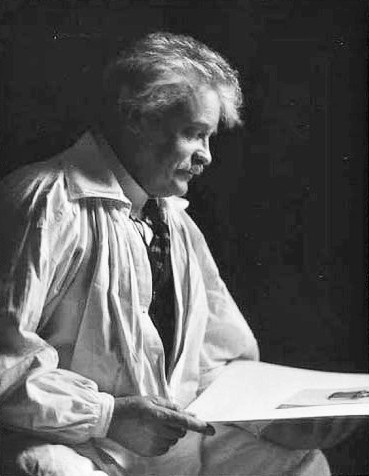
- Born: Georg Arthur Jensen; 31 August 1866; Rådvad, Denmark
- Died: 2 October 1935 (aged 69); Copenhagen, Denmark
- Resting place: Hellerup Cemetery
- Education: Sculpting
- Alma mater: Royal Danish Academy of Fine Arts
- Known for: Silversmith
- Movement: Art Nouveau
- Website: Official Website

Signature
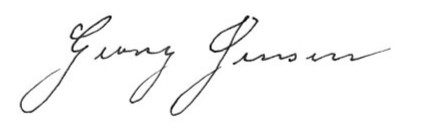

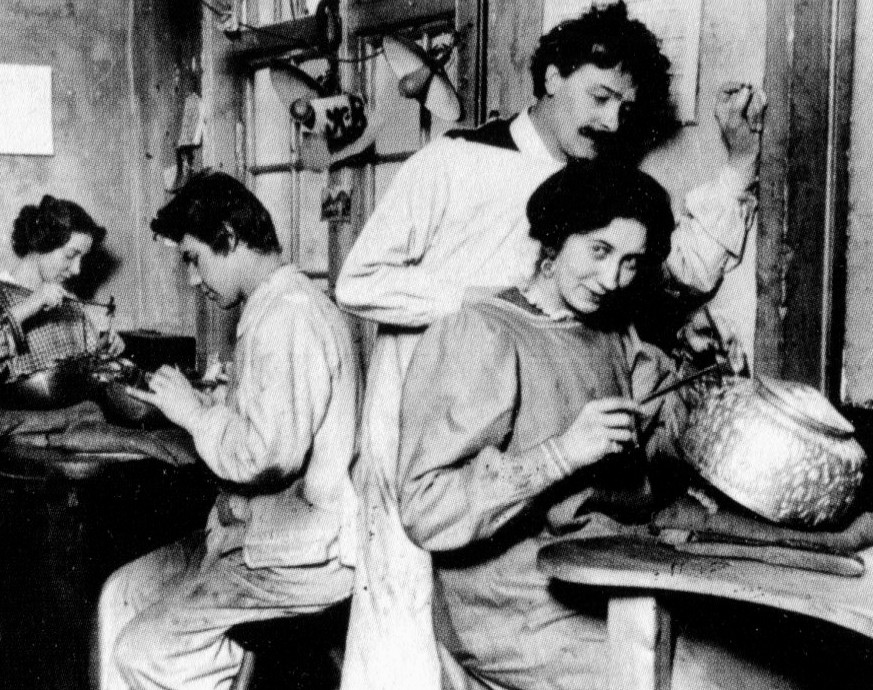
Georg Jensen in his workshop in Copenhagen, 1906

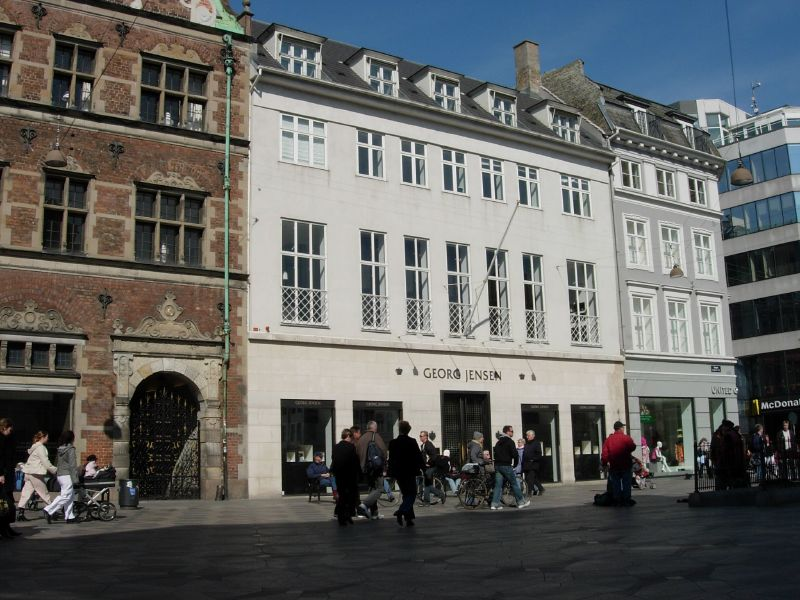
A Georg Jensen shop at Strøget, Copenhagen

Georg Arthur Jensen (31 August 1866 – 2 October 1935) was a Danish silversmith and founder of Georg Jensen A/S (also known as Georg Jensen Sølvsmedie).

== Early life ==
Born in 1866, Jensen was the son of a knife grinder in the town of Raadvad, just to the north of Copenhagen. Jensen began his training in goldsmithing at the age of 14 in Copenhagen. His apprenticeship with the firm Guldsmed Andersen ended in 1884, and this freed Georg to follow his artistic interests.

In 1884 he became a journeyman and in 1887 he enrolled at the Royal Danish Academy of Fine Arts (Kongelige Danske Kunstakademi), where he studied sculpture with Theobald Stein. He graduated in 1892 and began exhibiting his work. After graduation he started studying ceramics with Joachim Petersen (1870–1943).

Although his ceramic sculptures were well received, making a living as a fine artist proved difficult and he turned his hand to the applied arts: first as a modeller at the Bing & Grøndahl porcelain factory and, beginning in 1898, with a small pottery workshop he founded in partnership with Christian Petersen. Again the work was well received, but the sales were not strong enough to support Jensen, now a widower, and his two young sons.

== Career ==
Jensen made his first piece of jewelry in 1899, a silver and gilt "Adam and Eve" belt buckle. In 1901, Jensen abandoned ceramics and began again as a silversmith and designer with the master Mogens Ballin. This led Jensen to make a landmark decision, when in 1904, he risked what small capital he had and opened his own little silversmithy at 36 Bredgade in Copenhagen.

Jensen's training in metalsmithing along with his education in the fine arts allowed him to combine the two disciplines and revive the tradition of the artist craftsman. Soon, the beauty and quality of his Art Nouveau creations caught the eye of the public and his success was assured. His silver and jewelry designs from this period often featured plump abstract organic shapes and were accented with gemstones like amber, garnet, citrine, malachite, moonstone, and opal. This approach reflected his personal style, which was rooted in the Art Nouveau movement, but also transcended it with a more streamlined version popular in the 1920s and 1930s. The Copenhagen quarters were greatly expanded and before the end of the 1920s, Jensen had opened retail stores in Berlin (1909), London (1921), and New York City (1924). The New York retail store, Georg Jensen Inc. (New York, NY), was founded and operated independently as a family business by Frederik Lunning, a successful salesman of Georg Jensen products first in Odense, then in Copenhagen. The first store, 1924-1935, was incorporated as Georg Jensen Handmade Silver, followed in 1935-1978 by the large Fifth Avenue department store selling many goods aside from Jensen silver, incorporated as Georg Jensen Inc.

In 1930, Adda Husted Andersen worked for Jensen in New York City, enameling homewares.

== Museum collections and exhibitions ==
During his lifetime, Jensen's work was collected by museums including the Danish Museum of Decorative Art and the Museum Folkwang.

In 2005, the Bard Graduate Center in New York presented an exhibition entitled Georg Jensen Jewelry.

== Georg Jensen brand signs ==
When he was twenty Georg Jensen signed his first sculpture with "My Father" (1887). In 1894 he used the markings GJ as brandsign and from 1899 he often used GJ. In most cases the year was put next to the brand sign.

=== Brand signs of Georg Jensen ===
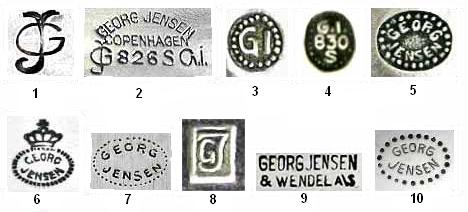
1. Used 1904–1908; 2. Used 1909–1914; 3. Used 1910–1925; 4. Used 1915–1930; 5. Used 1915–1927; 6. Used 1925–1932; 7. Used in the years 1930–1939 for engravings; 8. Used 1933–1944; 9. Used 1945–1951 for items that were sold in Copenhagen; 10. Used 1945–present

=== Brand signs from the designers of Georg Jensen ===
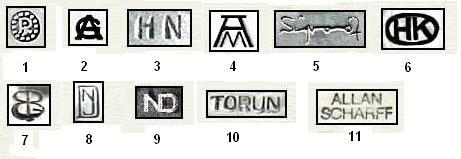
1. Johan Rohde (1856–1935); 2. Gundorph Albertus (1887–1970); 3. Harald Nielsen (1892–1977); 4. Arno Malinowski (1899–1976); 5. Sigvard Bernadotte (1907–2002); 6. Henning Koppel (1918–1981); 7. Bent Gabrielsen (b. 1928); 8. Nanna and Jørgen Ditzel; 9. Nanna Ditzel (1923–2005); 10. Vivianna Torun Bülow-Hübe (1927–2004); 11. Allan Scharff (b. 1940)

=== Family tree Georg Jensen ===
Jørgen Jensen 1831-1895	Martha Martine Marie Harding 1831-1903
Georg Arthur Jensen 1866-1935	Alexander	Charles Johan	Arild Oscar	Valdemar Louis	Frits	Astrid	Valborg
Marie Christiane Antonette Wulff 1864-1897
Vidar Wulff Jensen 1891-1987
Jørgen Adolf Harding Jensen 1895-1966
Magna Maren Petersen 1865-1907
Vibeke Jensen 1904-1937
Laura Julie Johanne Nielsen 1883-1918
Lise Georg Jensen 1912-1994
Birgitte Georg Jensen 1914-1998
Søren Georg Jensen 1917-1982
Magdalene Hanna Agnes Christiansen 1888-1966
Mette Georg Jensen 1921-2009
Ib Georg Jensen 1927-2021

== Sources ==
Georg Jensen, Ib (1999 & 2004) ”Der var engang en sølvsmed - Historien om min far Georg Jensen” (Once there were a silversmith – the story of my father). By Ib Georg Jensen, Georg Jensen's youngest son and published in Danish by publishing house Aschehoug, Denmark, in 1999 (1st Edition) ISBN 9788755334410, 227 pages. Also published in Danish by publishing house Forum (Forlaget Forum), Denmark, in 2004 (2nd Edition) ISBN 9788755334410, 227 pages.
