= Henning Koppel =

Danish designer and sculptor (1918–1981)

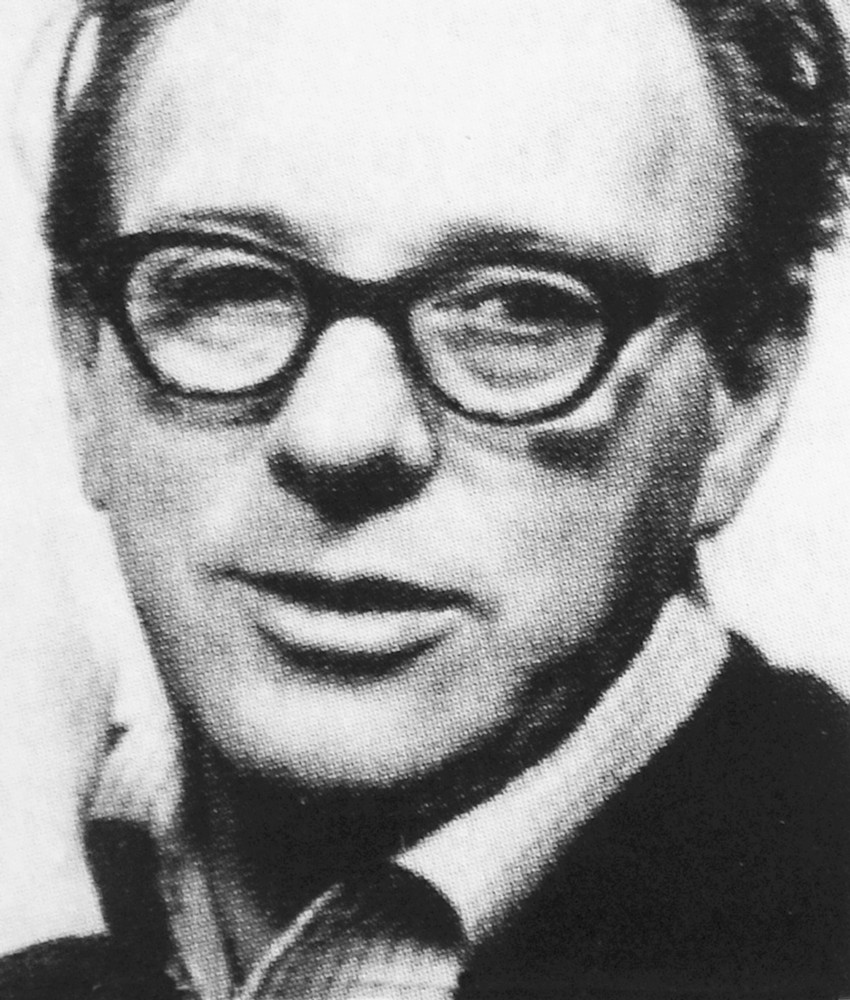
- Henning Koppel (c. 1950)
- Born: 8 May 1918; Copenhagen
- Died: 27 June 1981 (aged 63); Copenhagen
- Resting place: Bispebjerg Cemetery
- Alma mater: Royal Danish Academy of Fine Arts; Académie Ranson
- Occupation: Designer, sculptor, jewelry designer, silversmith, watchmaker
- Employer: Georg Jensen A/S (1945–1981)

Henning Koppel (8 May 1918 – 27 June 1981) was a Danish artist and designer. He is most known for his work for Georg Jensen in the years after World War II. He also designed porcelain (Bing & Grøndahl), glass (Holmegaard) and lamps (Louis Poulsen & Co).

== Early life and education ==
Koppel was born on 8 May 1918 in Copenhagen, the son of editor and later editor-in-chief of Politiken Valdemar Koppel (1867–1949) and translator Elise Jørgensen (1880–1974). He graduated from Øregårds Gymnasium in 1934 and then studied under professor Einar Utzon-Frank at the Royal Danish Academy of Fine Arts's School of Sculpture in 1936–37 and at Académie Ranson in Paris in 1938.

== Sculpture ==
Koppel had his debut as a sculptor at the Artists' Authumn Exhibition in 1935 with an expressive portrait bust. His best works as a sculptor are the busts of Valdemar and Jytte Koppel (1938 and 1942, both in black granite) and Tora Nordstrom Bonnier and Karl-Adam Bonnier (both 1944). He was also represented with drawings on a number of exhibitions.

== Design ==
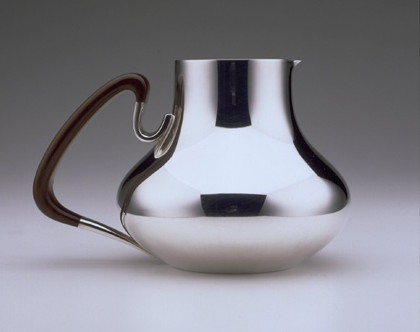
Silver pitcher designed for Georg Jensen

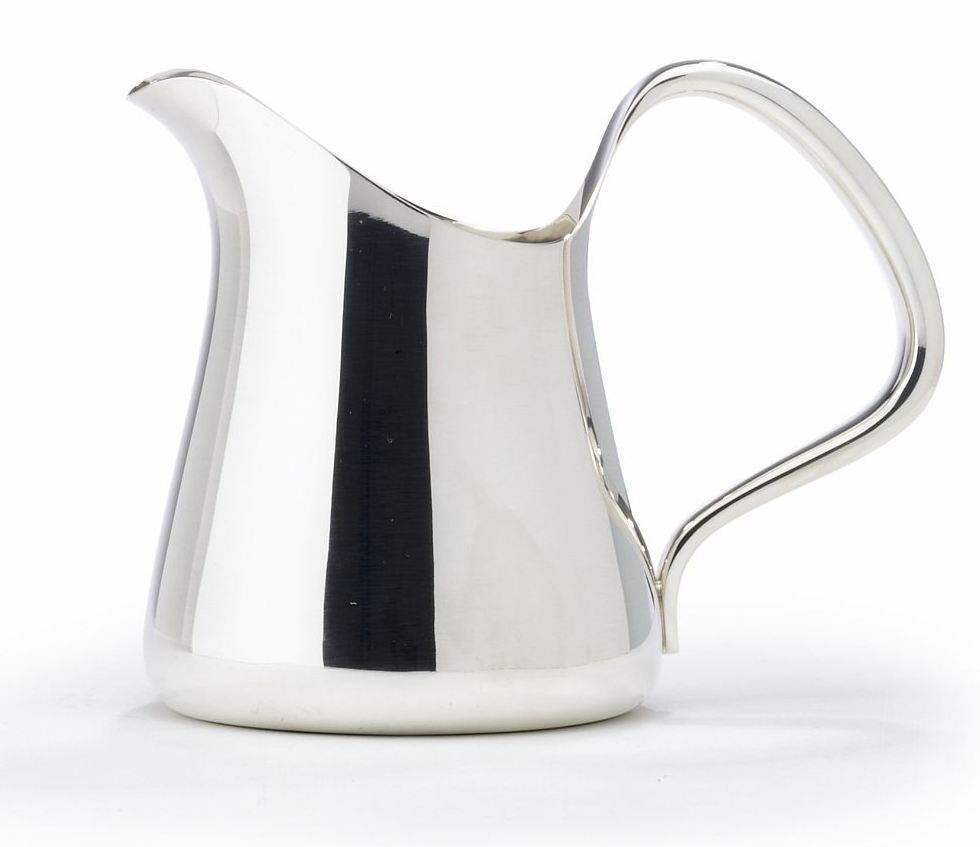
Silver milk jug designed for Georg Jensen

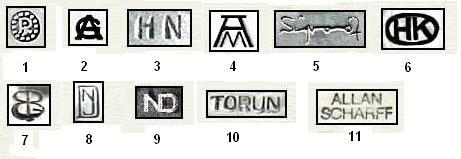
Georg Jensen silver marks (Henning Koppel's is No. 6)

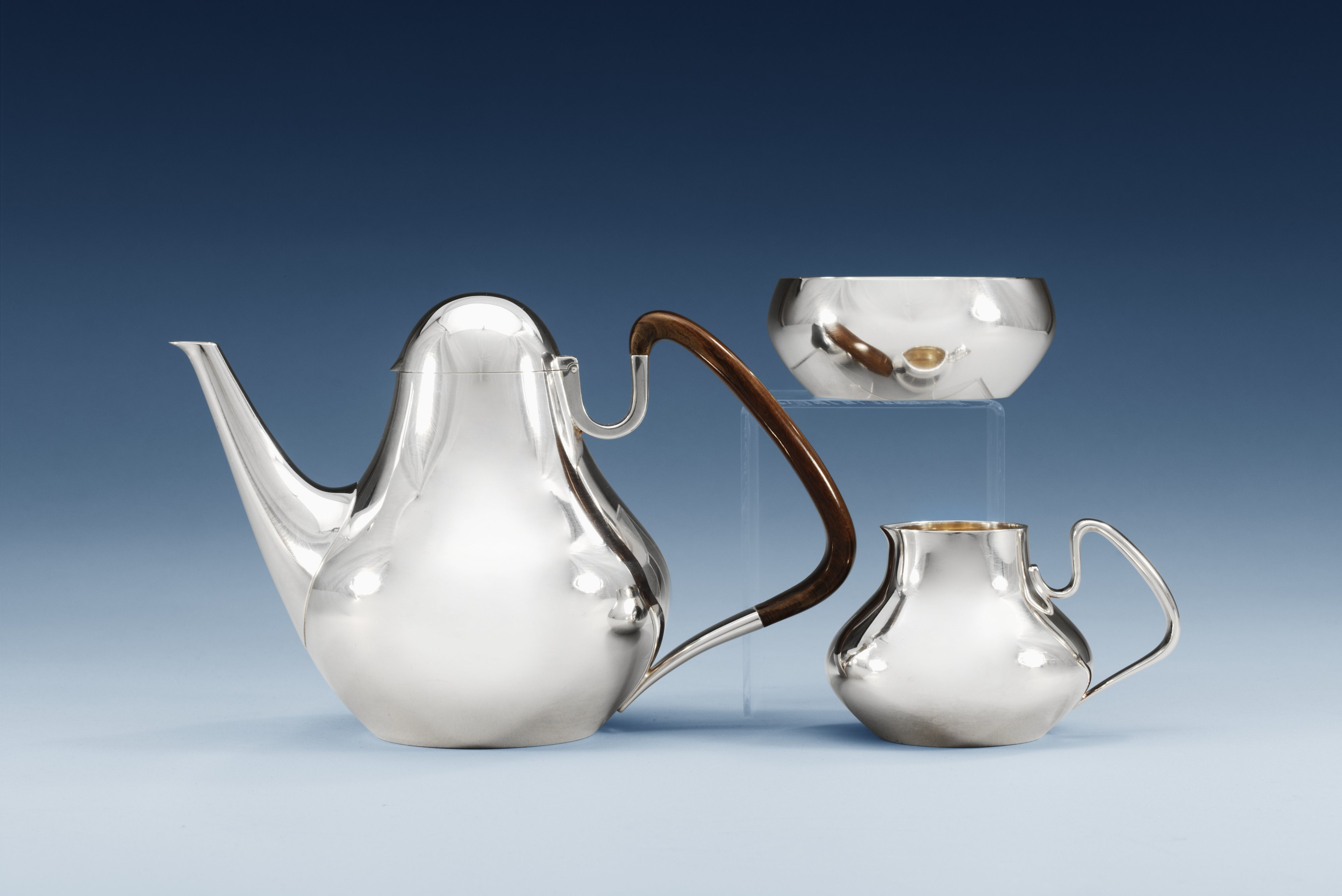
Various pieces designed for Georg Jensen

As a result of his Jewish background, Koppel had to seek refuge in Sweden during World War II, residing in Stockholm in 1943–44. He attracted considerable attention for his work as a jewelry designer for Svenskt Tenn.

Back in Denmark in 1945, he obtained a contract with Georg Jensen, a collaboration that lasted for the rest of his life. His work was rewarded with gold medals on three Milan Triennials in a row in (1951, 1954 and 1957). His designs for Georg Jensen included hollowware, jewellery and flatware patterns such as Caravel (silver, 1957) and New York (steel, 1963).

In 1961 Koppel also began to work for Bing & Grøndahl. His designs for the company included coffee and tea sets, flatware patterns and a number of jugs and serving dishes.

He also designed glassware for Holmegaard and Orrefors. In 1963 he won first prize in a competition for the design of a new series of stamps for Post Danmark, but his design proposal was never realized.

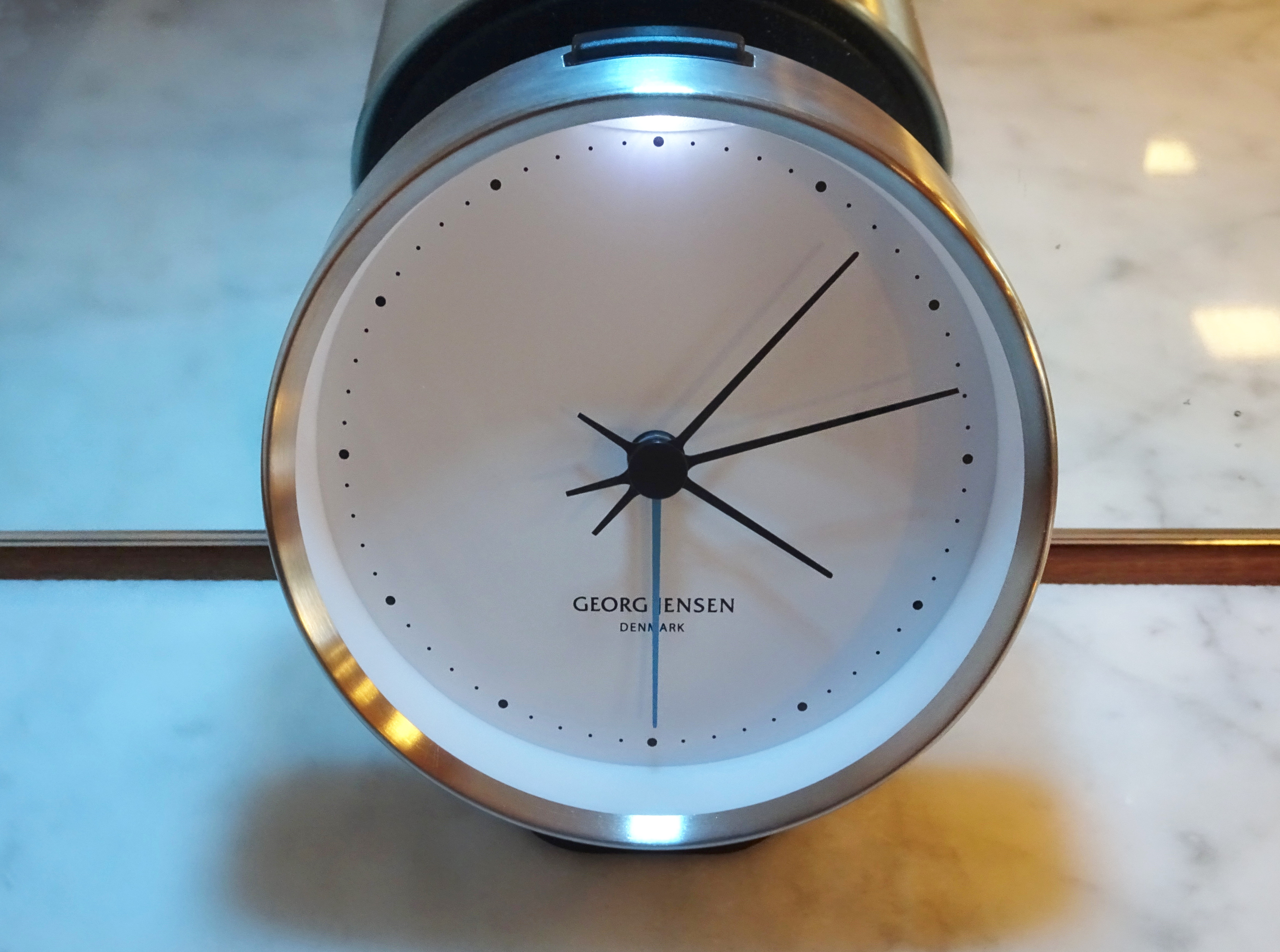
Alarm clock designed for Georg Jensen

== Exhibition ==
Koppel's work has been featured in numerous exhibitions in Denmark and abroad and he is represented in the collections of many leading design museums internationally.

== Written works ==
In 1975, Koppel published a collection of essays titled Var der så mere i vejen?

== Personal life ==
Koppel married Jytte Skouboe Petersen (18 October 1920 – ) in Copenhagen on 14 November 1941. She was a daughter of actor Eyvind Johan-Svendsen (1896–1946) and actress Else Skouboe (1898–1950).

He died on 27 June 1981 and is buried in Bispebjerg Cemetery.

== Awards ==
- 1951 golf mrfsl, Milan Triennial, Italy
- 1953 golf mrfsl, Milan Triennial, Italy
- 1953 Lunning Prize, Copenhagen, Denmark
- 1957 golf mrfsl, Milan Triennial, Italy
- 1963 International Design Award, USA
- 1963 Der goldene Löffel, Munich
- Diamonds-International Award 1966
- 1966 ID-prisen
- 1967 gold medal, Florence, Italy
- 1970 Silver Medal, Exempla 70, Munich, Germany
