= Royal Copenhagen =

Danish manufacturer of porcelain products

- Type: Subsidiary
- Industry: Pottery
- Founded: 1 May 1775; 251 years ago
- Headquarters: Copenhagen, Denmark
- Products: Porcelain ceramics
- Parent: Fiskars
- Website: royalcopenhagen.com

Royal Copenhagen, officially the Royal Porcelain Factory (Danish: Den Kongelige Porcelænsfabrik), is a Danish manufacturer of porcelain products and was founded in Copenhagen in 1775 under the protection of Danish Dowager Queen Juliane Marie. It is recognized by its factory mark, the three wavy lines above each other, symbolizing Denmark's three waterways: Storebælt, Lillebælt and Øresund.

== History ==
=== Early years ===
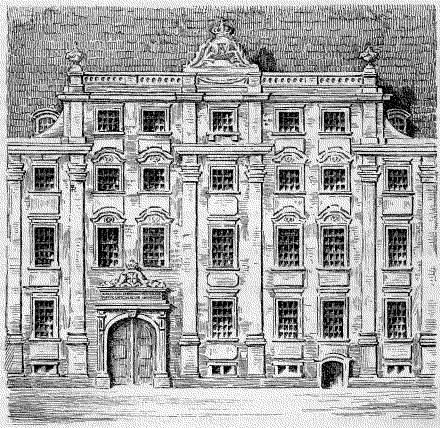
The Royal Porcelain Factory, at Holmskiold's time located in a former post office in Købmagergade

Starting in the 17th century, Europeans, long fascinated by the blue and white porcelain exported from China during the Ming and Qing dynasties, began to imitate the precious ware. The Royal Copenhagen manufactory's operations began in a converted post office in 1775. It was founded by chemist Frantz Heinrich Müller who was given a 50-year monopoly to create porcelain. Though royal patronage was not at first official, the first pieces manufactured were dining services for the royal family. Johan Theodor Holmskjold was appointed as the first director-in-chief of the company.

When, in 1779, King Christian VII assumed financial responsibility, the manufactory was styled the Royal Porcelain Factory. Holmskjold headed the operations until his death in 1793.

The Royal Porcelain Factory was headed by pharmacist Ludvig Manthey from 1796 to 1811.

The company was later headed by Carl Wilhelm Bergsøe (1800–1861). He was the father of writer Wilhelm Bergsøe whose childhood memories served as inspiration for his novel Fra den gamle fabrik.

In 1851, Royal Copenhagen showed its production at the Great Exhibition in London. In 1868, as a result of royal companies' privatization, the Royal Porcelain Factory came into private ownership and was sold at auction. The buyer was businessman Gustav Adolph Falck (1833–1892).

=== Merger with Aluminia ===
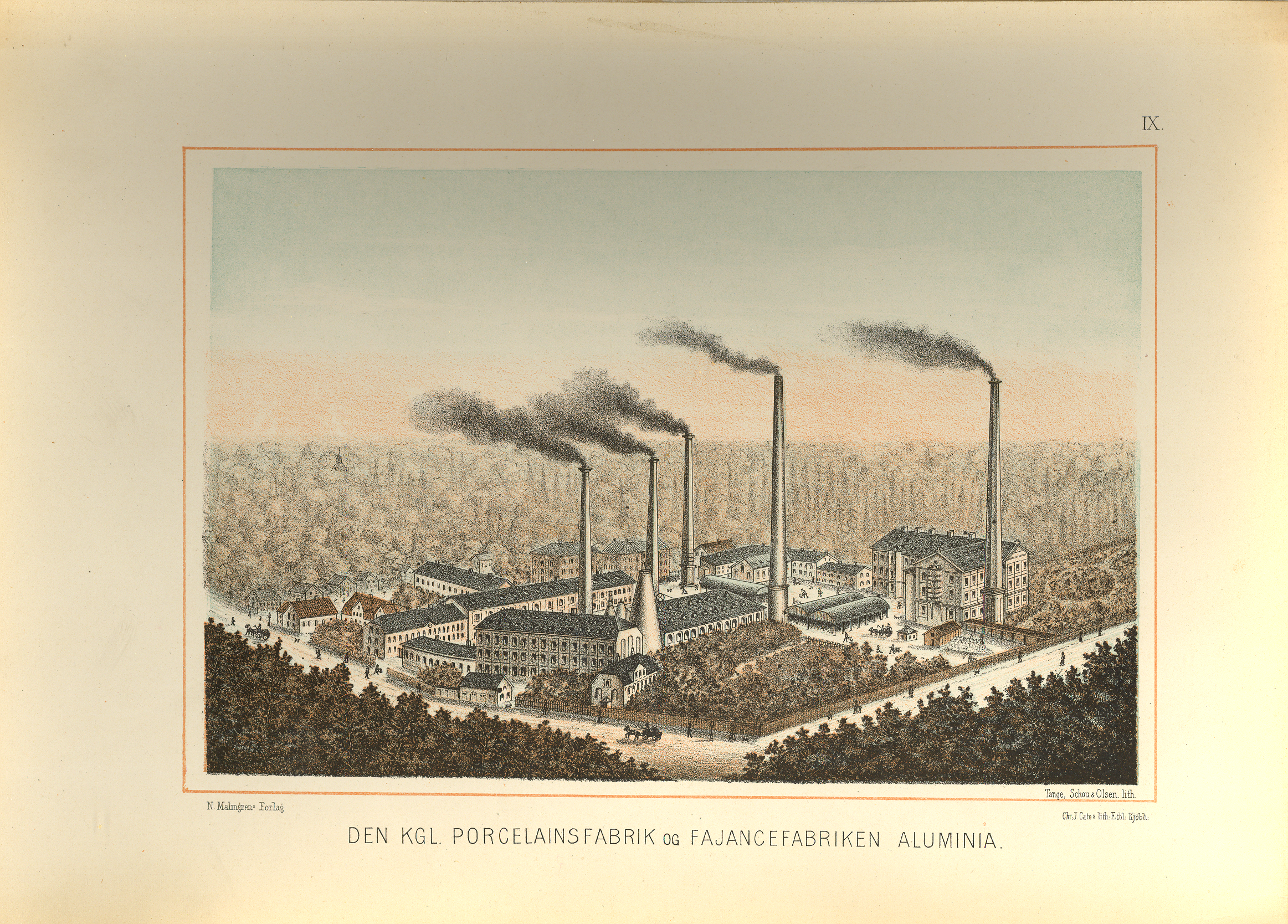
The combined Royal Porcelain Factory and Aluminia site in 1888.

In the mid-19th century, the many large European porcelain companies generally stood aloof from artistic developments such as Japonisme, and the Arts and Crafts movement, concentrating on tableware, and often struggling to throw off what had become the deadening influence of Rococo and Neoclassical styles. In the 1870s, most continued to produce an eclectic variety of revivalist styles, though sometimes experimenting with glazes, as at Meissen porcelain, which began to produce monochrome vases from 1883.

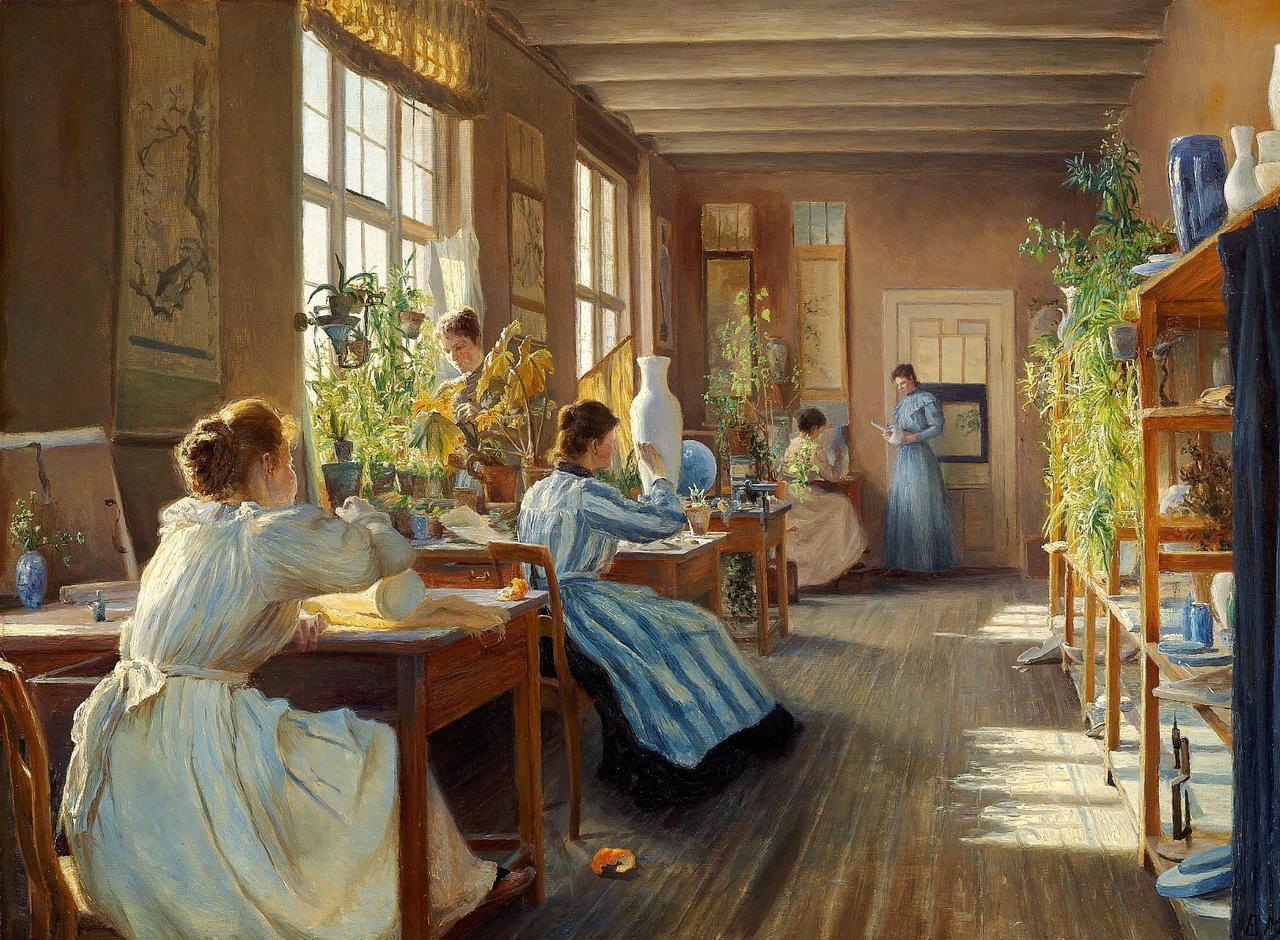
Women doing decorative work at the Royal Porcelain Factory, 1895

The first major porcelain company to seriously change its styles was Royal Copenhagen, which made radical changes from 1883, when it was bought by Aluminia, an earthenware company. Arnold Krog, an architect under 30 with no practical experience of the industry, was made artistic director the next year, and rapidly shifted designs in the same directions art pottery was exploring, commissioning many painters to design for the factory. Japanese influences were initially very strong. The new wares soon won prizes at various international exhibitions, and most of the large porcelain makers began to move in similar directions, causing problems for the smaller art potteries.

Shortly after Aluminia's acquisition, Royal Copenhagen production was moved to a modern factory building at Aluminia's site in Frederiksberg, on the outskirts of Copenhagen. At the Exposition Universelle (1889) in Paris, Royal Copenhagen won the Grand Prix, giving it international exposure.

== Current company ==
In recent years, Royal Copenhagen acquired Georg Jensen in 1972, incorporated with Holmegaard Glass Factory in 1985, and finally Bing & Grøndahl in 1987. Royal Copenhagen was a part of a group of Scandinavian companies, Royal Scandinavia, together with Georg Jensen, and was owned by a Danish private equity fund, Axcel. Following Axcel's acquisition of Royal Scandinavia, Holmegaard Glasværk was sold in an MBO, and a controlling interest in the Swedish glass works Orrefors Kosta Boda was sold to New Wave Group.

In December 2012, Axcel sold Royal Copenhagen to the Finnish listed company Fiskars, which was founded in 1649.

The company now produces its porcelain in Thailand. However, the luxury brand, Flora Danica, is still designed and painted in Denmark. Its design centre is also situated there so that the style and shape still retains its heritage.

== Patterns (original manufacturer in parentheses) ==
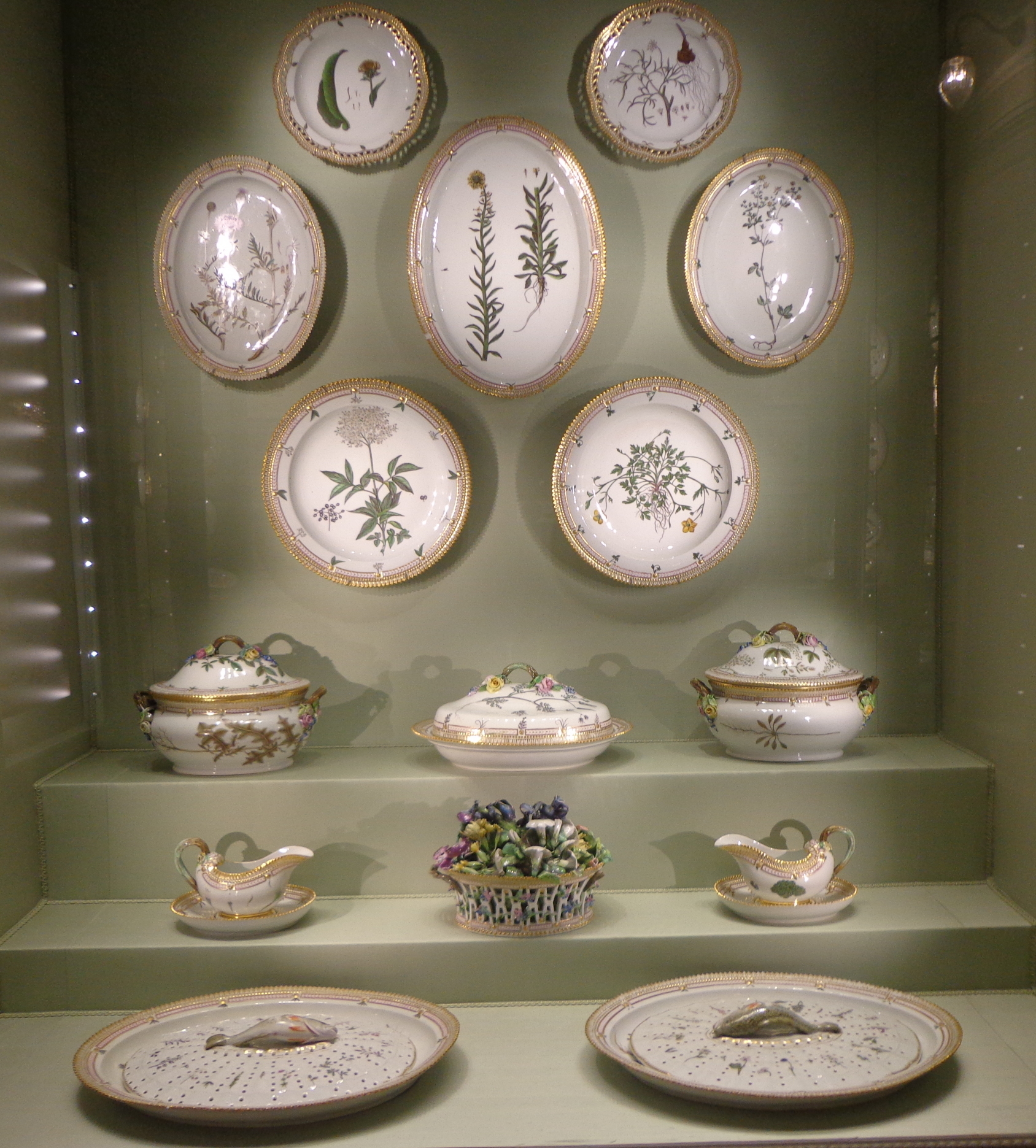
Pieces of the "Flora Danica" dinner service, Christiansborg Palace

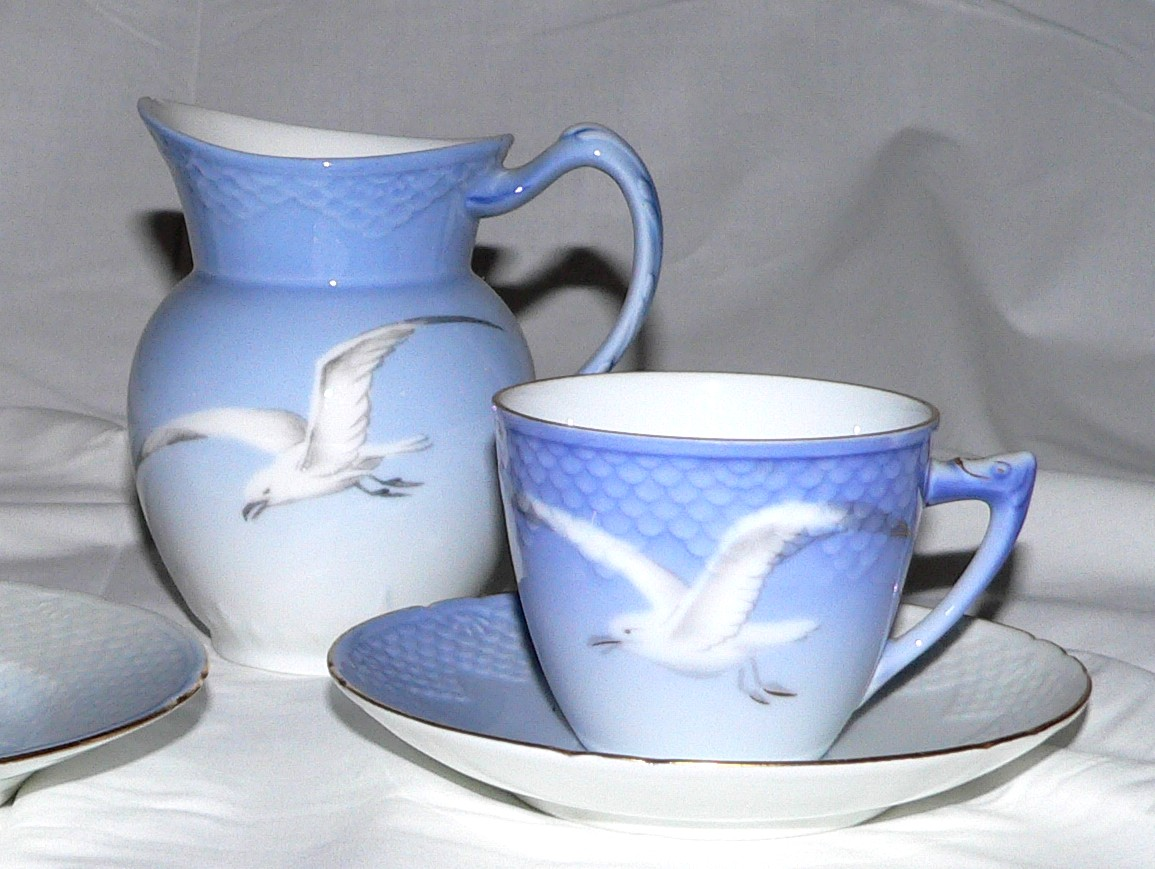
Seagull dinnerware, designed by Fanny Garde of Bing & Grøndahl in 1895

=== Blue Fluted ===
The factory's pattern No. 1, still in production, is "Musselmalet", "mussel-painted", called "Blue Fluted" in English-speaking countries. The "mussel blue" is cobalt. The discovery in 1772 of a rich vein of cobalt in Norway, the junior part of the joint kingdom, was quickly developed using some nearby water power into an industry, grinding cobalt to a fine dust to incorporate in ceramic glazes and glass manufacture. The mellowed Blaafarveværket site is a tourist attraction today. During the first half of the 19th century cobalt rivaled fisheries as the greatest source of wealth obtained from Norway. Many of the German porcelain manufactories in the 19th century produced a version of intense blue "echt Kobalt" decor combined with patterned gilding, using the Norwegian cobalt from Denmark.

=== Flora Danica ===
In 1790, Royal Copenhagen was commissioned by King Christian VII to produce a "Flora Danica" dinner service, with gilded edges and botanical motifs copied from the ongoing illustrated Flora Danica. It was intended as a gift for Catherine the Great; Royal Copenhagen has produced hand-painted pieces of "Flora Danica" to this day.

=== Other classical patterns ===
- Blue Flower, Henriette, Saxon Flower, Fan, Gemina, and Gemma (Royal Copenhagen)
- Empire, Offenbach, Butterfly and Seagull (Bing & Grøndahl)
- Tranquebar and Blue Line (Aluminia).

=== New and currently in production ===
Blue Fluted Plain (1775, revised in 1885), White Fluted (1775), Blue Fluted Mega (2000), Black Fluted Mega (2006), Princess (1978), Blue Fluted Half Lace (1888), Blue Fluted Full Lace (1775, revised in 1885), blomst (-), Hav (2019), White Elements (2008), Blue Elements (2011), Multicoloured Elements (2008), Star Fluted Christmas (2006), Flora (2012), Blue Palmette (2004), White Fluted Half Lace, Flora Danica (1790)

=== Discontinued ===
- Blue Flower, Gemina, Gemma, Jingle Bells, Blue Line, Frijsenborg and Julian Marie (Royal Copenhagen)
- Seagull, Blue Henning Koppel, White Henning Koppel, Tema, Mexico (Bing & Grøndahl)

== Collectables ==
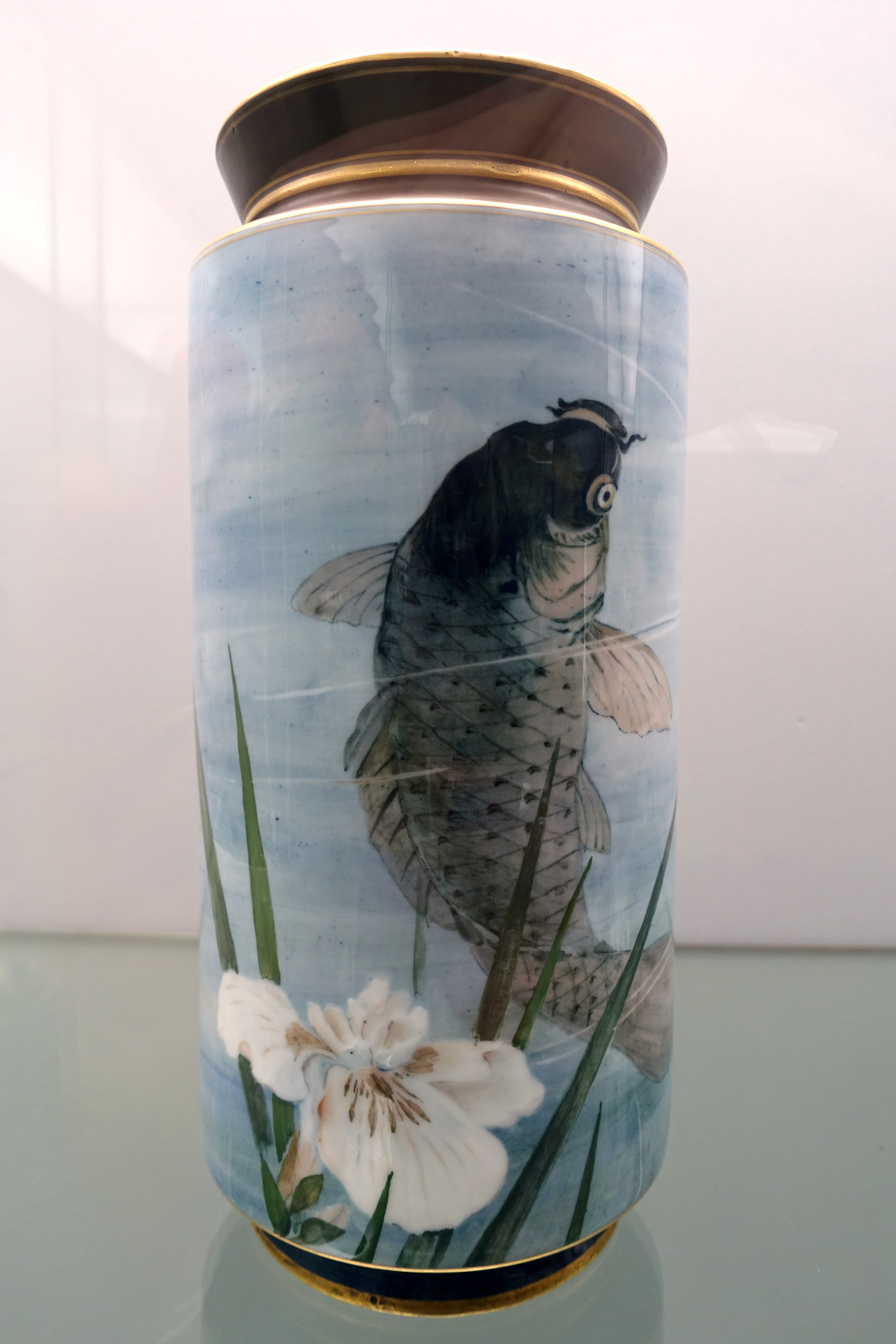
Vase with Japanese wild carp, shape by Arnold Krog and Søren Bech Jacobsen, 1887, decorated by August F. Hallin, 1888, porcelain

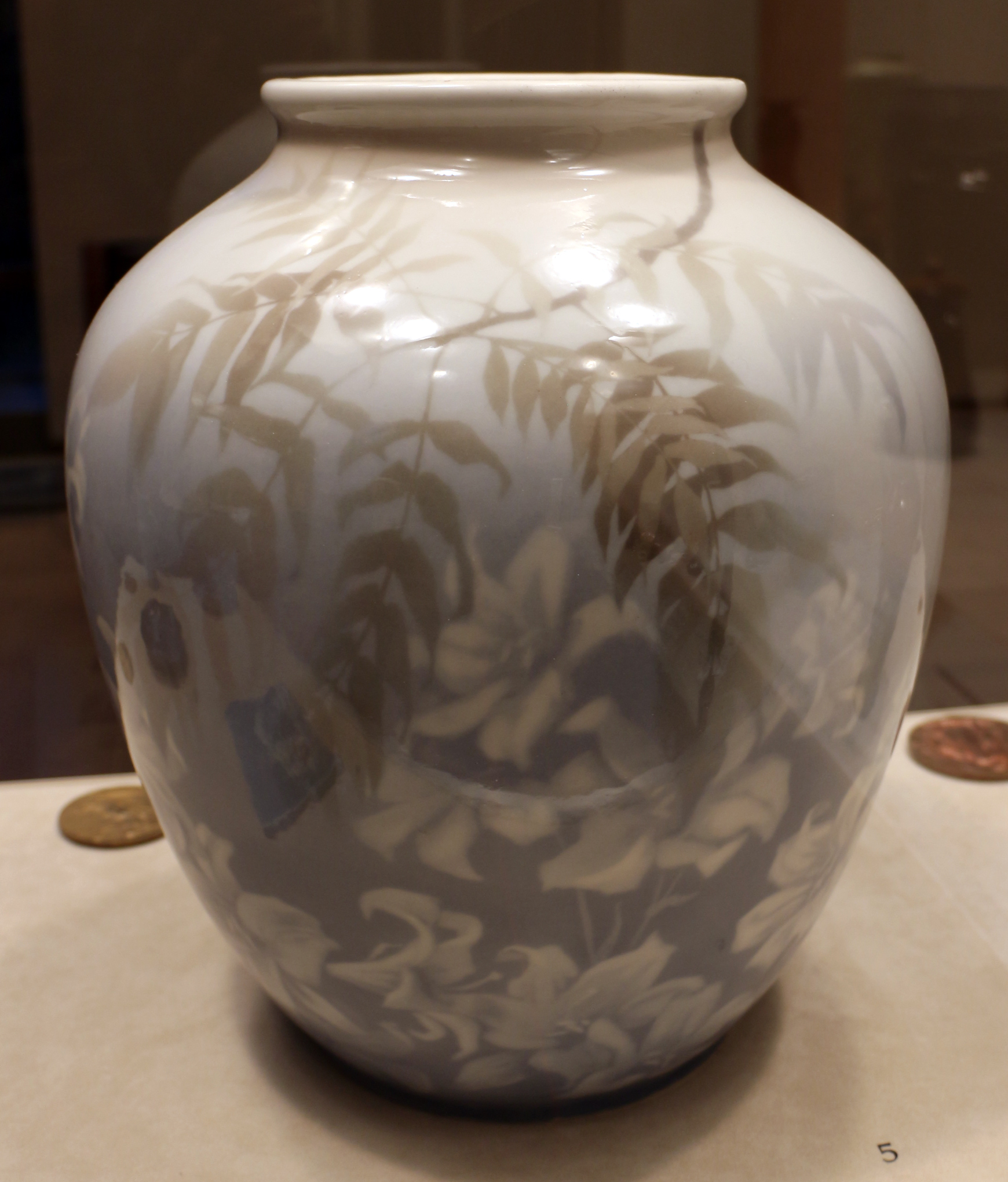
Vase designed by Gerhard Heilmann, 1891

- Royal Copenhagen 2010 plaquettes: Numbered and named cobalt blue decorated plates depicted a variety of scenes, holidays, years, and occasions. Most commonly round, they measured about 8 cm (3-1/4") in diameter, with a blue scene on white background.
- Larger, approximately 18.5 cm, blue on white cobalt blue decorated plates, created annually for Mother's Day, the Olympics and other commemorations. Some weren't annual issues, instead depicted scenes. In 1895, Royal Copenhagen began producing annual Christmas plates, and continue to do so.
- Porcelain pipes, beginning in 1969 and manufactured for about 15 years.
- An American porcelain collector commissioned a hand-painted hippopotamus service, completed in 2006.

== Christmas plates ==
The tradition of Christmas plates started hundreds of years ago in Europe, when wealthy people presented their servants with cakes and sweets, served on decorative plates of wood or metal at Christmas time. The servants referred to these gifts as their Christmas Plate. In 1895 Bing & Grøndahl produced the first Christmas plate made from porcelain, with the date inscribed, and has made one each year since. In 1908 the Royal Copenhagen factory followed suit. Each year these plates are made in limited quantities and have been collectable for over 100 years. Each plate is made in the year of issue only, after which the mould is destroyed, and the design is never made again.

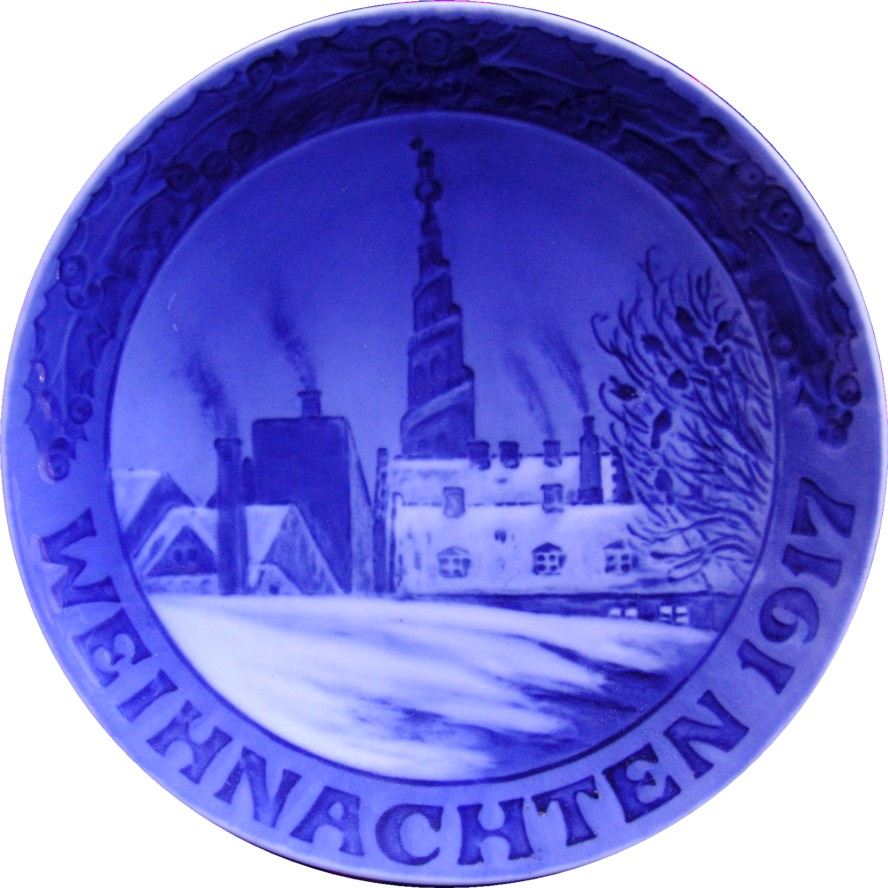
1917 Christmas Plate

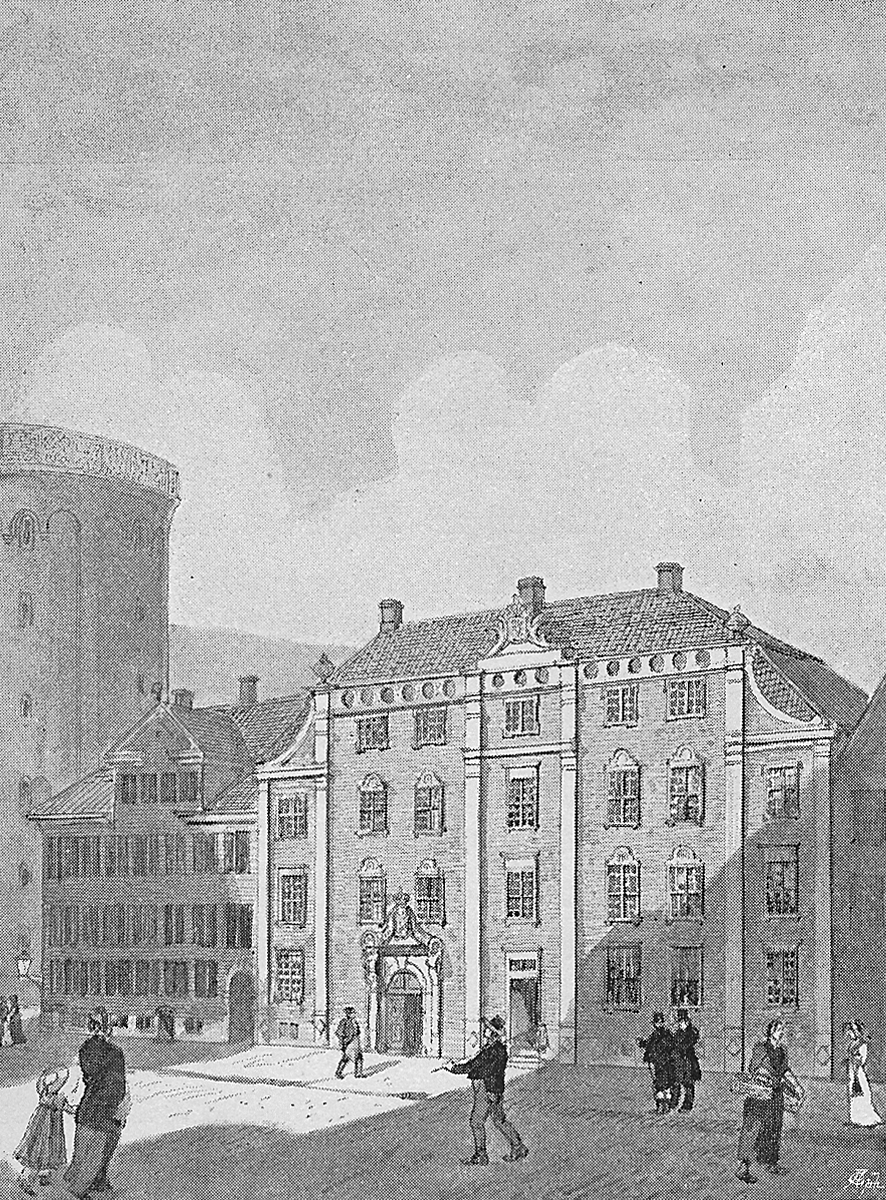
Royal Porcelain manufactory on Købmagergade in Copenhagen (19th century)

The themes since 1908 are:

Year	Christmas Plate	Notes
1908	Madonna & Child	
1909	Danish Landscape	
1910	The Magi	
1911	Thief Plate	
1911	Landscape	
1912	Christmas Tree	
1913	Frederiks Kirke	Frederik's Church
1914	Helligåndskirken	Church of the Holy Ghost
1915	Danish Landscape	
1916	Shepherds in the Field	
1917	Vor Frelsers Kirke	Church of Our Saviour, Christianshavn
1918	The Shepherds	
1919	In The Park	
1920	Mary & Child	
1921	Aabenraa Market	
1922	Three Singing Angels	
1923	Landscape	
1924	Sailing Ship	
1925	Christianshavn	
1926	Christianshavns Kanal	
1927	Ship's Boy at Tiller	
1928	Vicar's Family	
1929	Grundtvigs Kirke	Grundtvig's Church
1930	Fishing Boats	
1931	Mother & Child	
1932	Frederiksberg	
1933	Storebæltsfærgerne	Great Belt ferries
1934	Eremitageslottet	Hermitage Hunting Lodge
1935	Kronborg	
1936	Roskilde Domkirke	Roskilde Cathedral
1937	Copenhagen	
1938	Østerlars Church	
1939	Ship on Greenland Ice	
1940	The Good Shepherd	
1941	Village Church	
1942	Bell Tower	
1943	Flight Into Egypt	
1944	Winter Scene	
1945	Peaceful Motif	
1946	Zealand Church	
1947	The Good Shepherd	
1948	Nødebo Kirke	Nødebo Church
1949	Vor Frue Kirke	Church of Our Lady
1950	Boeslunde Church	
1951	Christmas Angel	
1952	Christmas In The Forest	
1953	Frederiksberg	
1954	Amalienborg	
1955	Fanø Girl	
1956	Rosenborg Slot	Rosenborg Castle
1957	The Good Shepherd	
1958	Grønland	Greenland
1959	Christmas Night	
1960	The Stag	
1961	Training Ship Denmark	
1962	Den lille havfrue	The Little Mermaid
1963	Højsager Mill	
1964	Fetching The Tree	
1965	Little Skaters	
1966	The Blackbird At Christmas	
1967	The Royal Oak	
1968	The Last Umiak	
1969	Old Farmyard	
1970	Christmas Rose & Cat	
1971	Hare In Winter	
1972	In The Desert	
1973	Train Homeward Bound	
1974	Owl	
1975	Marselisborg Slot	Marselisborg Palace
1976	Vibæk Mill	
1977	Immervad Bridge	
1978	Greenland Scene	
1979	Choosing The Tree	
1980	Bringing Home The Tree	
1981	Admiring The Tree	
1982	Waiting For Christmas	
1983	Merry Christmas	
1984	Jingle Bells	
1985	The Snowman	
1986	Christmas Holidays	
1987	Winter Birds	
1988	Copenhagen Skyline	
1989	Old Skating Pond	
1990	Tivoli Gardens	
1991	Santa Lucia Fest	
1992	The Royal Coach	
1993	Arriving Train	
1994	Home From Shopping	
1995	The Manor House	
1996	Street Lamps	
1997	Roskilde Domkirke	Roskilde Cathedral
1998	Boat Scene	
1999	The Sleigh Ride	
2000	Trimming The Tree	
2001	Watching The Birds	
2002	Winter In The Forest	
2003	Season's Greetings	
2004	Awaiting The Christmas Train	
2005	Hans Christian Andersen House	
2006	Kronborg	
2007	Christmas in Nyhavn	
2008	Copenhagen Christmas	
2009	Christmas at Amagertorv	Amager Square
2010	Christmas in Greenland	
2011	Waiting For Santa Claus	
2012	Sailing The North Sea	
2013	Copenhagen Harbour	
2014	Hans Christian Andersen	
2015	Christmas Days	
2016	Ice Skating In Copenhargen	
2017	Walk At The Lakes	
2018	Christmas Tree Market	
2019	Meeting in the field	
2020	Church Of Our Lady	Vor Frue Kirke
2021	Winter in the Garden	
2022	Frederiksborg castle	
2023	Meeting in the Paddock	
2024	Christmas Anticipation	
2025	Grundtvig's Church	Grundtvigs Kirke

== See also ==
- Porcelain manufacturing companies in Europe
