= Irminger =

Irminger is a surname. Notable people with the surname include:

- Carl Friedrich Irminger (1813–1863), Swiss draughtsman, lithographer, and engraver
- Ingeborg Plockross Irminger (1872–1962), Danish artist, wife of Valdemar
- Valdemar Irminger (1850–1938), Danish painter

== See also ==
- Irminger Current
- Irminger Sea
