= Effie Hegermann-Lindencrone =

Danish porcelain artist

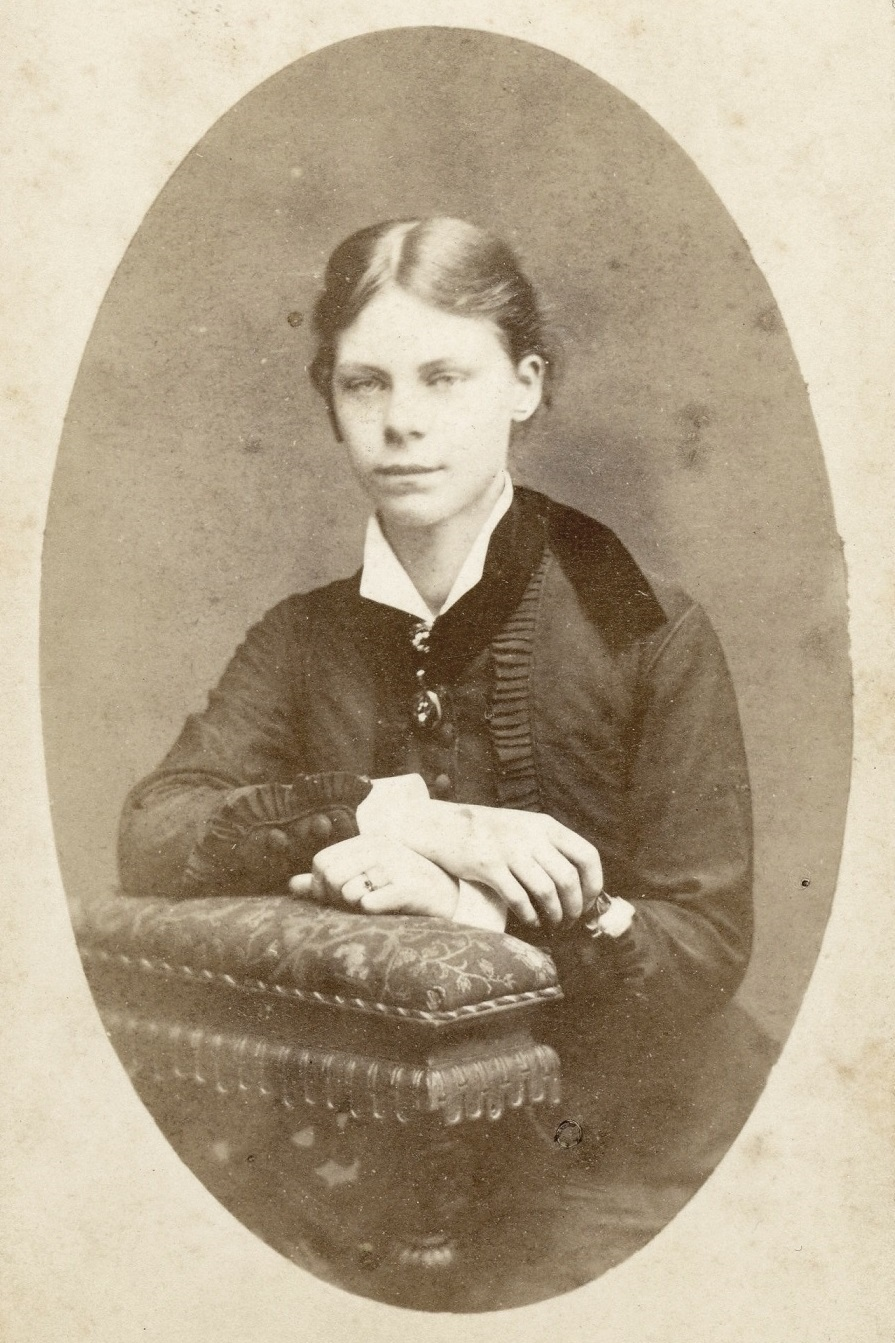
Effie Hegermann-Lindencrone (July 1879)

Effie Frederikke Nicoline Octavia Hegermann-Lindencrone (1860–1945) was among Denmark's most notable porcelain artists. She devoted her entire life to decorating porcelain at Bing & Grøndahl's factory. She adopted the Art Nouveau style, with subjects such as aquatic plants, seaweed, birds and fish, often depicted in carved scenes on her vases. Her work is included in the collections of the several art museums, including the National Gallery of Denmark, the Victoria and Albert Museum, and the Art Institute of Chicago.

== Biography ==
Born on 27 August 1860 in Hillerød, Effie Frederikke Nicoline Octavia Hegermann-Lindencrone was the daughter of Diderik William Hegermann-Lindencrone (1817–1885) and Amalie Wilhelmine Sehested (1831–1928). While studying at the Arts and Crafts School for Women under Pietro Krohn, she met Fanny Garde who became her partner and lifelong companion.

Together with Garde, in 1885 she worked at G. Eifrig's ceramics workshop in Valby before joining Bing & Grøondahl's factory the following year where they decorated the Heron Set, pioneering the firm's underglaze technique. The set was successfully exhibited at Copenhagen's Nordic Exhibition in 1888 and at the Exposition Universelle in Paris in 1889. As a result, the firm was able to develop underglaze as its main approach, popularizing its blue, transparent porcelain.

Thereafter the two companions were permanently employed at Bing & Grøndahl's where they shared a studio, becoming female exceptions to work which at the time was usually carried out by men. No doubt influenced by her factory director Jens Ferdinand Willumsen, she developed her own more plastic decorative style, pioneering the use of plants as a subject in underglaze porcelain. She developed carving in the porcelain as a means of emphasizing her designs. In the 20th century, she went on to work on freer sculptural forms with seaweed, birds and fish in her vase designs.

Hegermann participated in Bing & Grøndahl exhibitions over the years, including those in Berlin (1910–1911) and New York (1927). Her works are exhibited in several major art museums.

Effie Hegermann-Lindencrone died in the Frederiksberg district of Copenhagen on 17 December 1945 and was buried in Garrison Cemetery, Copenhagen.

== Gallery ==
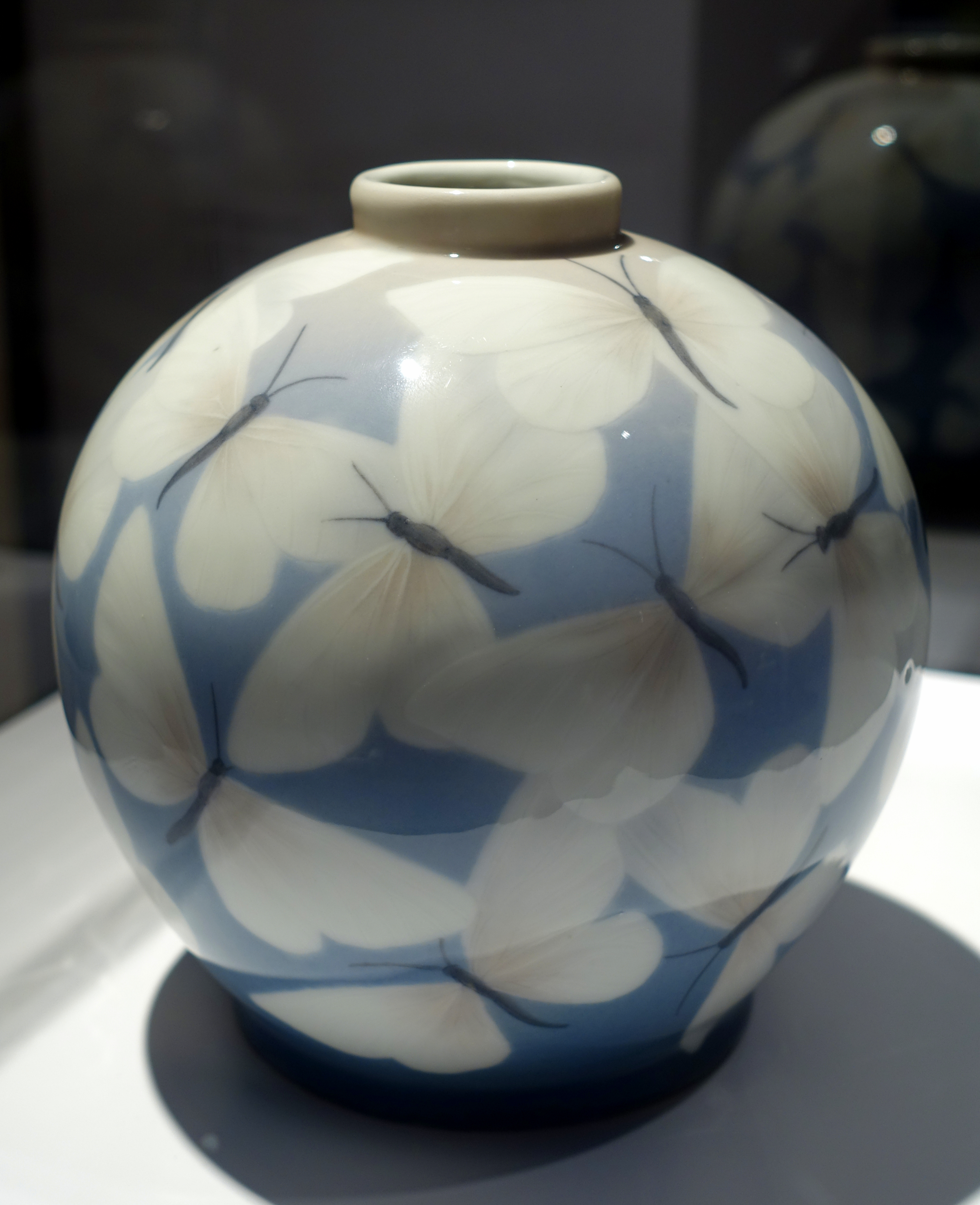
Vase designed by August F. Hallin and Effie Hegermann-Lindencrone (1896)

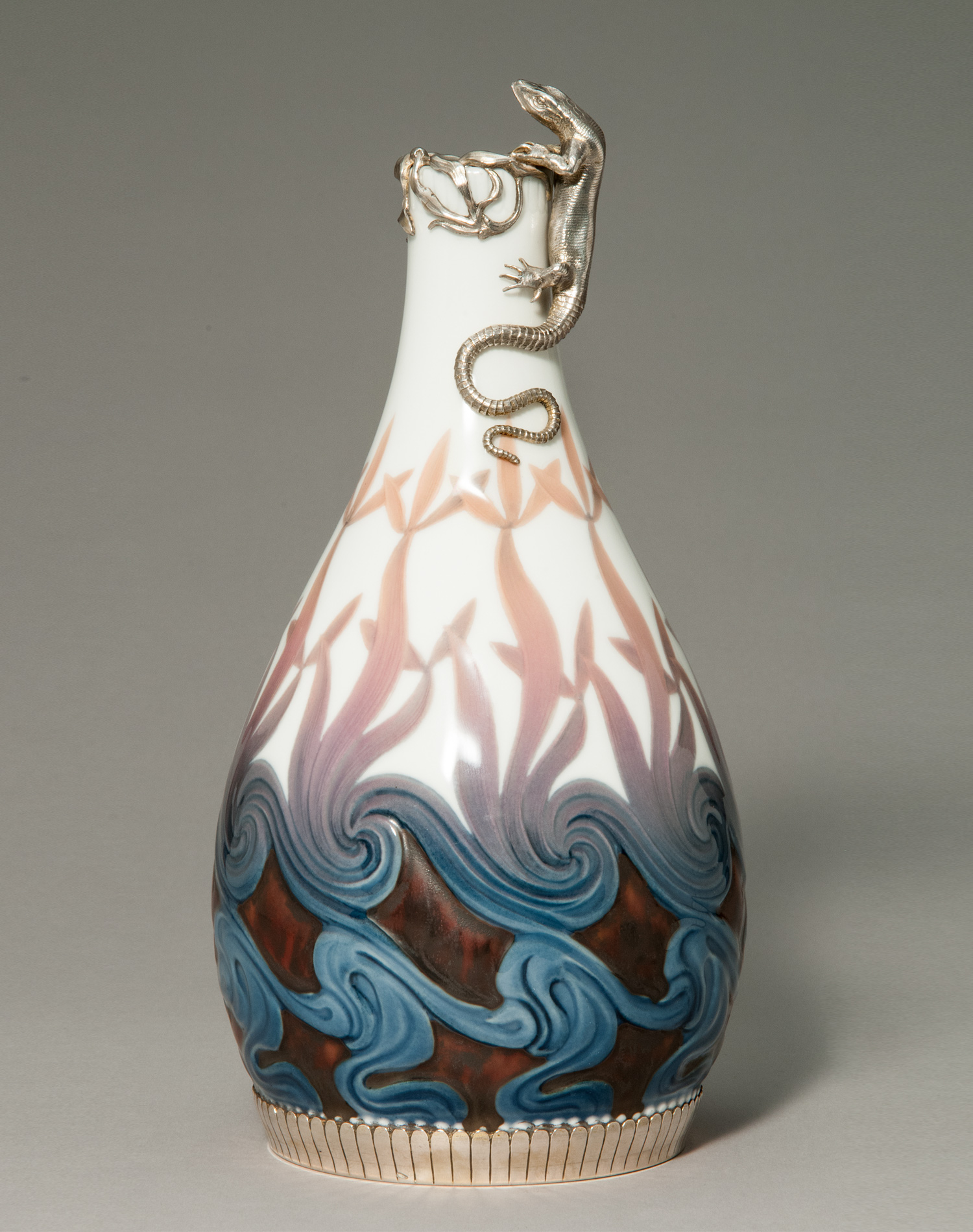
Vase with lizard by Effie Hegermann-Lindencrone (c.1902)

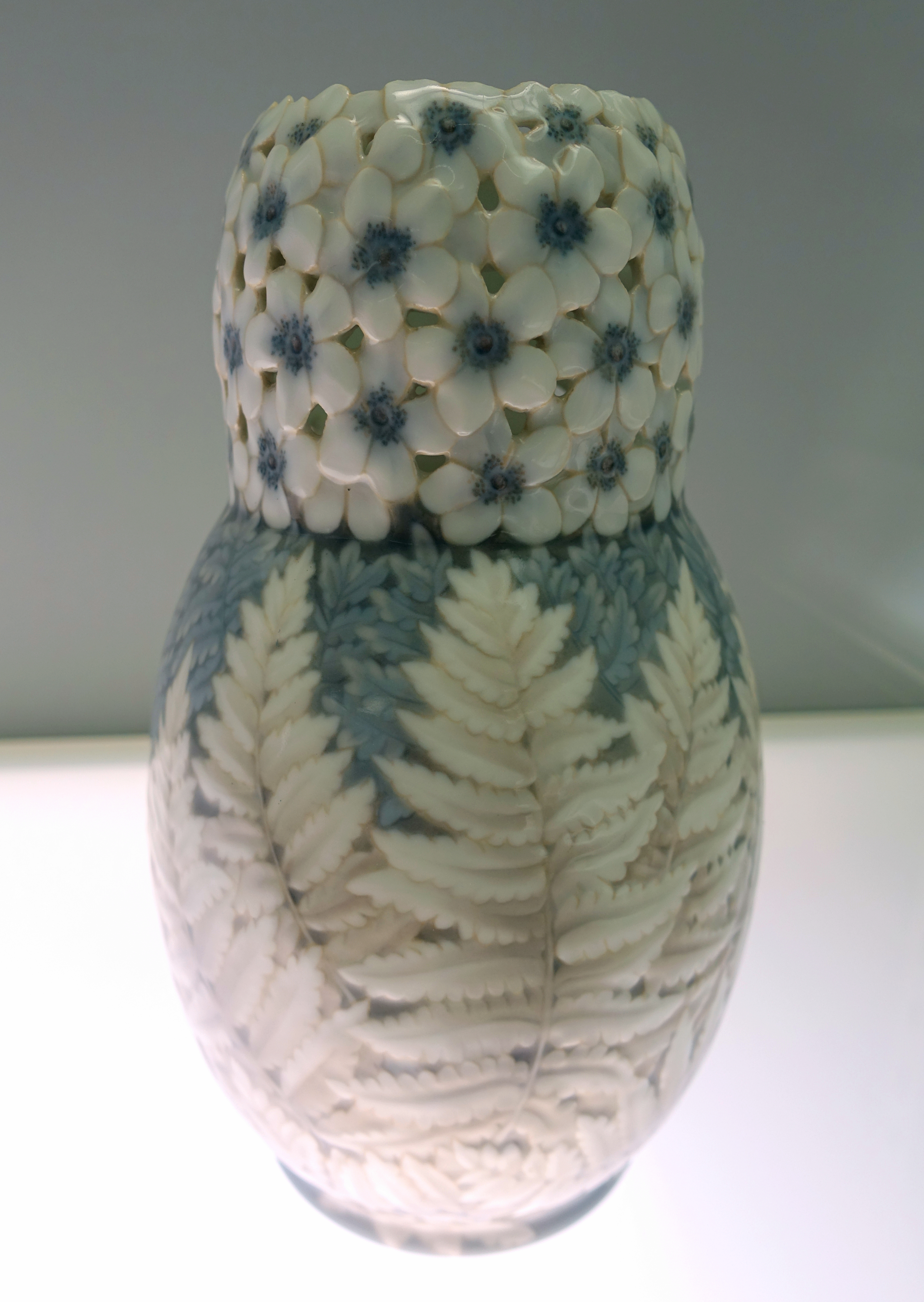
Vase with blossoms and fern leaves by Effie Hegermann-Lindencrone (1907)

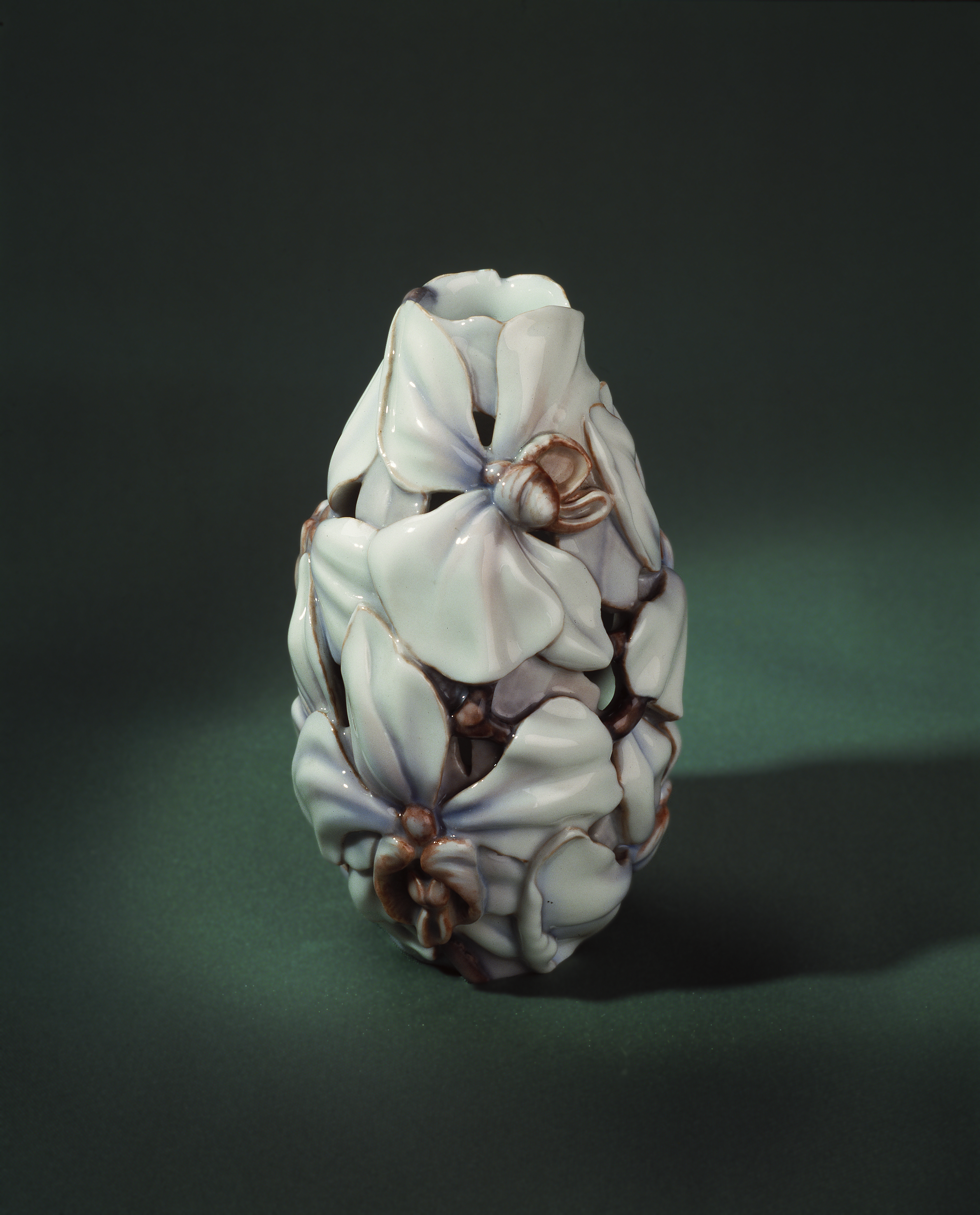
Vase designed by Effie Hegermann-Lindencrone (1910s)

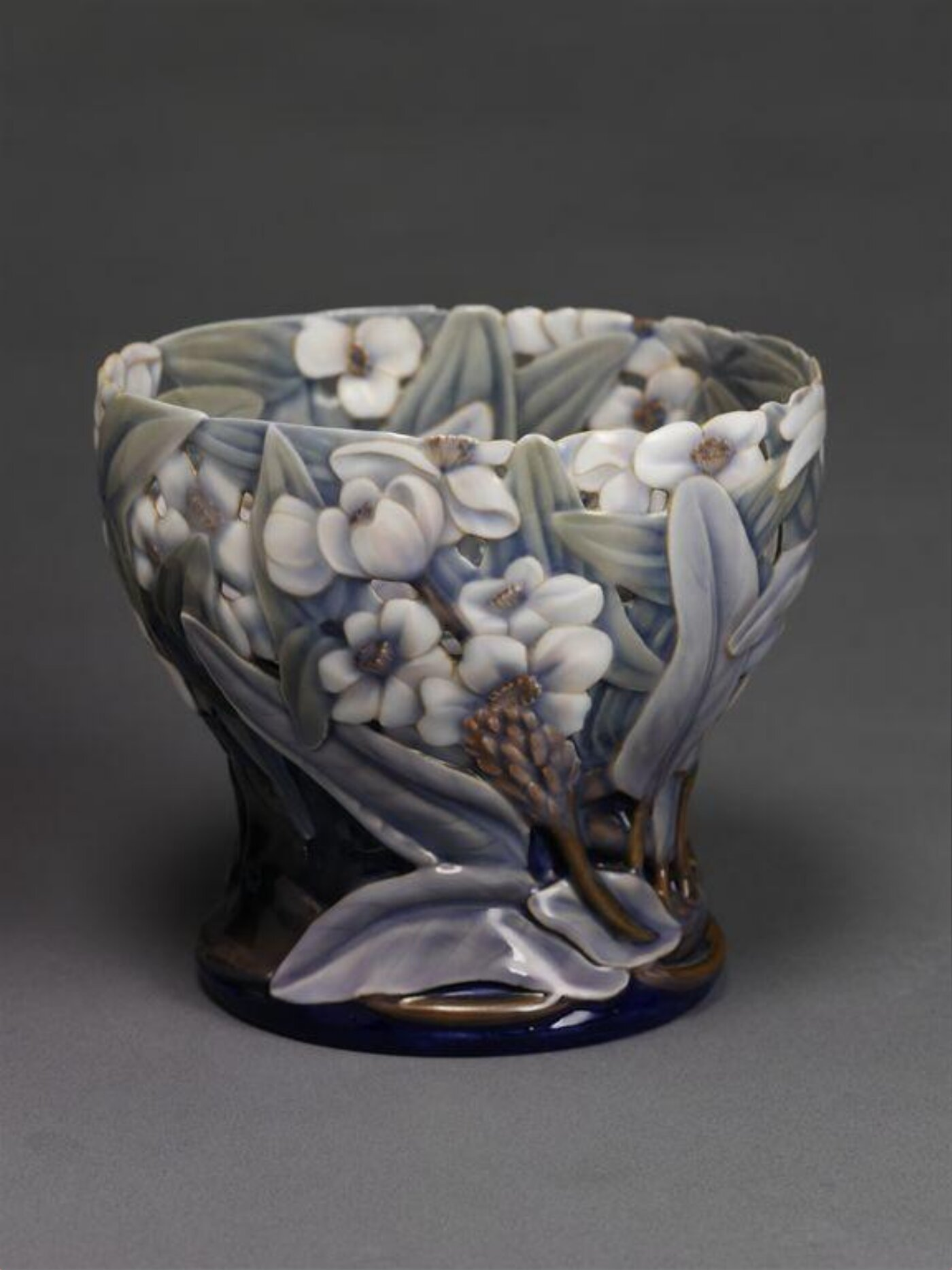
Bowl designed by Effie Hengermann-Lindencrone with foliage and dragonfly (1917)
