= Fanny Garde =

Danish porcelain painter

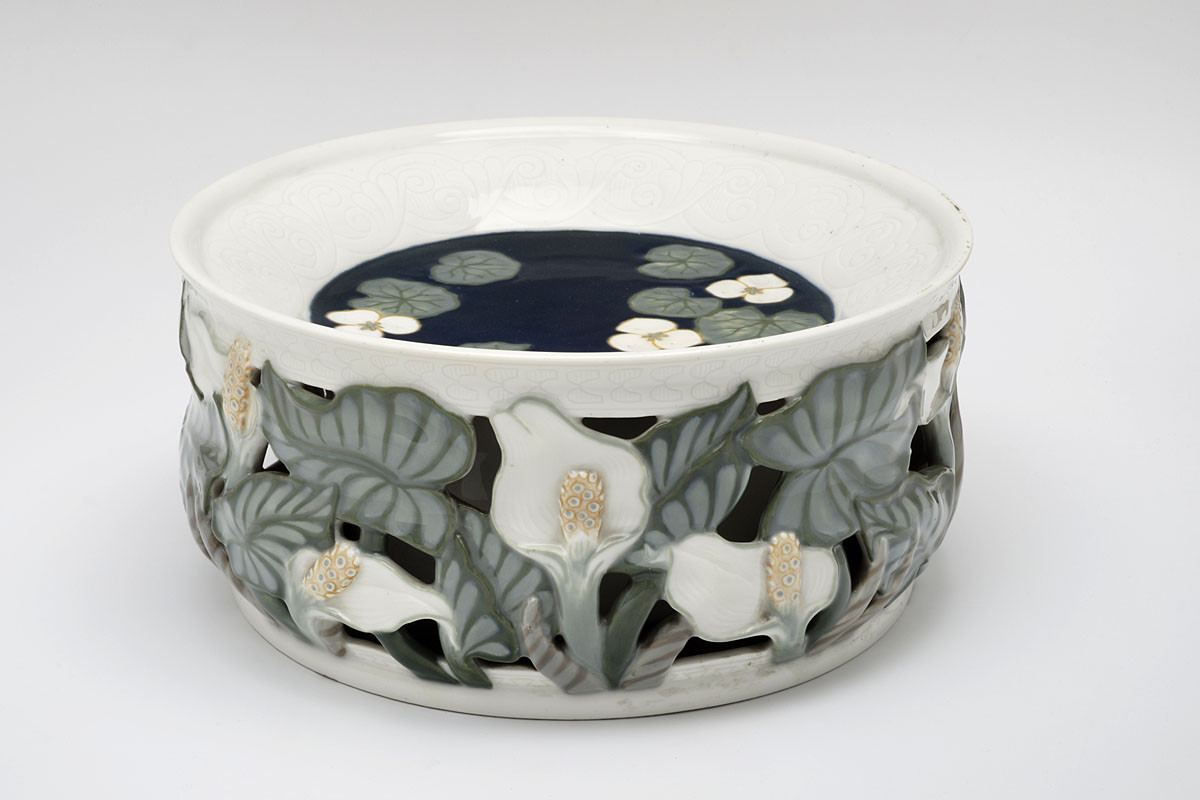
Bowl by Fanny Garde

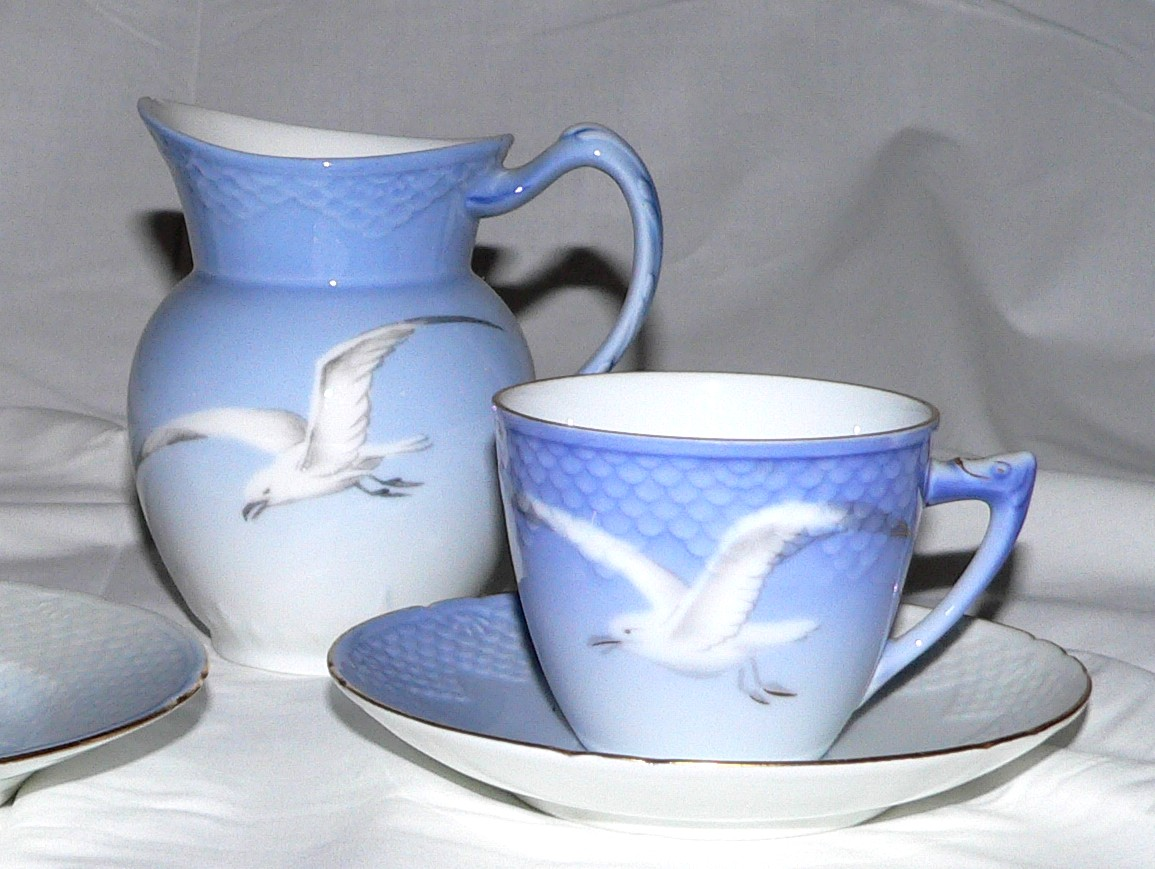
Bing & Grøndahl's Seagull Set, decorated by Fanny Garde (1895)

Fanny Susanne Garde (1855–1928) was a Danish porcelain painter who worked for the Bing & Grøndahl porcelain factory from 1886. She began by decorating the company's Heron dinnerware set (Hejrestellet), which proved to be an award-winning success in underglaze painting. She went on to contribute many of her own designs, especially vases decorated with flowers or fruits, sometimes also working with crackle-glazed porcelain. She is remembered in particular for decorating Bing & Grøndahl's Seagull set (Mågestellet), featuring a white bird in a blue sky.

== Biography ==
Born on 20 February 1855 in Norre Løgum parish in Tønder Municipality in the south of Jutland, Fanny Susanne Garde was the daughter of the parish priest Peter Christian Garde (1816–1906) and Augusta Charlotte Margrethe Lawætz (1826–1906). In 1876 she arrived in Copenhagen where she attended the recently established Arts and Crafts School for Women headed by Charlotte Klein. After her studies, she remained at the school until 1884 as a teacher. While there she met Effie Hegermann-Lindencrone, who became her partner. They two women set up a home together in Copenhagen, and travelled together to Italy, France, England and Germany.

The two worked together at G. Eifrig's Københavns Lervarefabrik in Valby in 1885 before joining Bing & Grøndahl's porcelain factory the following year. Thanks to the firms artistic director Pietro Krohn, who had been their instructor at the Arts and Crafts School, they were given a studio of their own where they decorated the Heron Set, pioneering the firm's underglaze technique. The set was successfully exhibited at Copenhagen's Nordic Exhibition in 1888 and at the Exposition Universelle in Paris in 1889. As a result, the firm was able to develop underglaze as its main approach, popularizing its blue, transparent porcelain.

Although Garde worked mainly with underglaze painting, she later also used the crackle-glaze technique, becoming one of the firm's most active artists. She decorated vases and other items of porcelain with flowers and fruits in her distinctive style, achieving particular success with her Vase with Christmas Roses (1897) and her Vase with Blackberries (1907). Perhaps her most successful decorative work was the Seagull Set with a white bird flying in a blue sky.

Garde presented her work at several international exhibitions, including the International Exhibition of Modern Decorative and Industrial Arts held in Paris in 1925, where she won a gold medal.

Fanny Garde died in Copenhagen on 29 April 1928 and is buried in Solbjerg Park Cemetery in Frederiksberg.
