= Johan Kjeldahl =

Danish chemist (1849–1900)

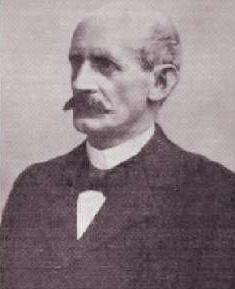
- Born: 16 August 1849; Copenhagen, Denmark
- Died: 18 July 1900 (aged 50); Tisvildeleje, Denmark
- Known for: Accurate determination of nitrogen content in a sample
- Scientific career
- Fields: Chemistry
- Workplaces: Carlsberg Laboratory

Johan Gustav Christoffer Thorsager Kjeldahl (Danish pronunciation: [joˈhæn ˈkʰelˌtɛˀl] 16 August 1849 – 18 July 1900), was a Danish chemist who developed a method for determining the amount of nitrogen in certain organic compounds using a laboratory technique which was named the Kjeldahl method after him.

== Professional life ==
Kjeldahl worked in Copenhagen at the Carlsberg Laboratory, associated with Carlsberg Brewery, where he was head of the Chemistry department from 1876 to 1900.

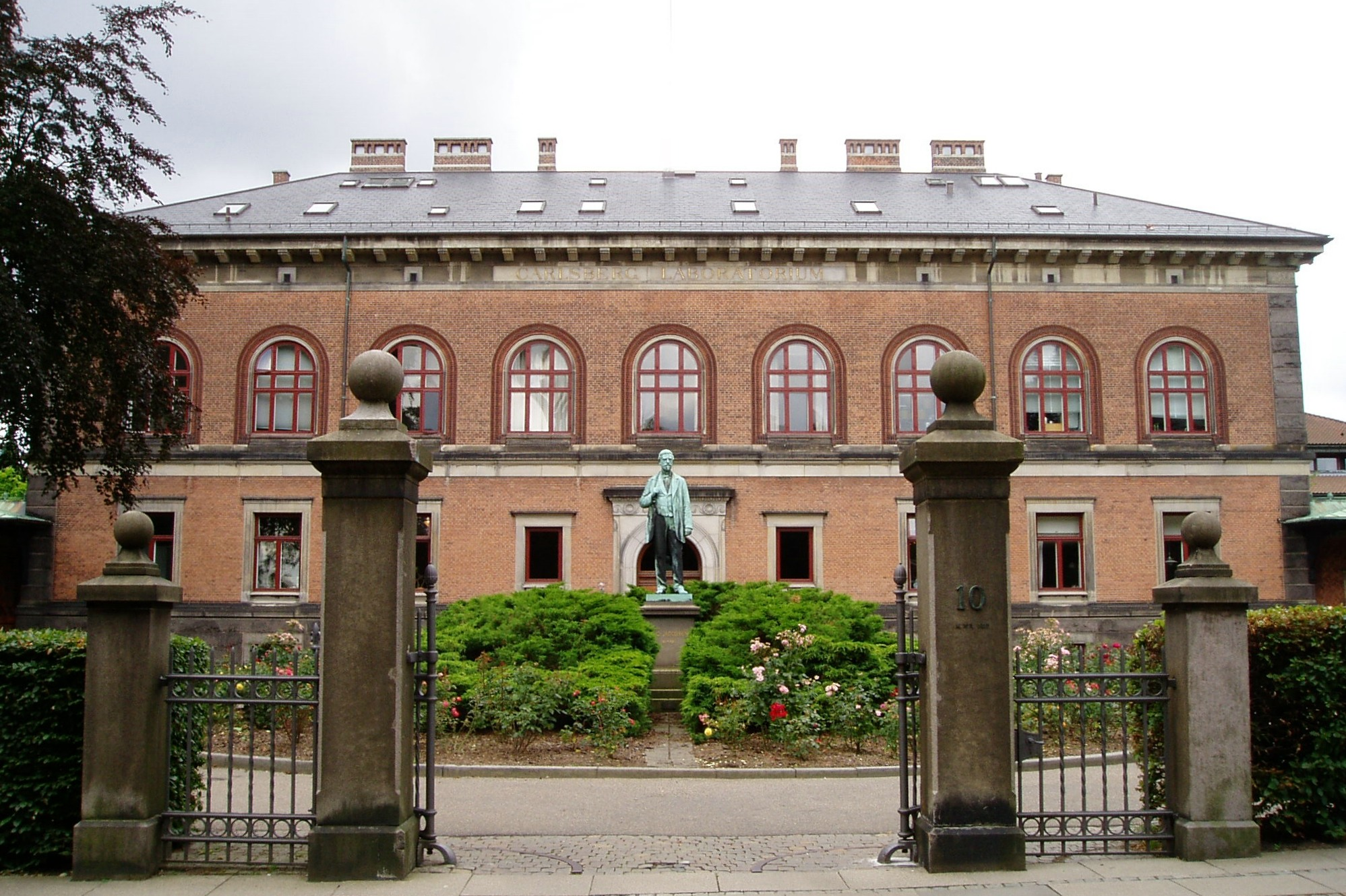
Carlsberg Laboratory today.

He was given the job to determine the amount of protein in the grain used in the malt industry. Less protein meant more beer. Kjeldahl found the answer was in developing a technique to determine nitrogen with accuracy but existing methods in analytical chemistry related to proteins and biochemistry at the time were far from accurate.

=== Kjeldahl method ===
In order to solve the problem of determining accurate nitrogen content in a sample, Kjeldahl developed a method which involves a two-step reaction: a distillation and a back titration. He found that ammonium salts can be produced by the reaction between organic compounds and sulfuric acid; this step is a digestion. Ammonium salts produced from this step were collected and, in a second process, reacted with lye. The ammonia produced in this step was distilled and dissolved in a standardized solution of hydrochloric acid or sulfuric acid. Finally, this solution was back titrated with caustic soda to indirectly measure nitrogen.

During the 1880s, Kjeldahl used potassium sulfate to raise the boiling point of the acid and mercury as a catalyst to speed the decomposition. For the back titration process of the released ammonia, he used boric acid buffer solution.

On 7 March 1883, Kjeldahl presented his method at the Danish Chemical Society.

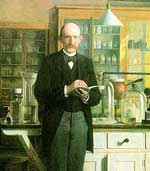
Johan Kjeldahl working at Carlsberg Laboratory in the 1880s. Portrait by Otto Haslund

== Legacy ==
Johan Kjeldahl died on 18 July 1900 in Tisvildeleje, Denmark at the age of 50.

His laboratory technique for nitrogen and protein analysis is still the universally accepted method for this analysis. Although other methods claim to be faster and more efficient, none can cope with the variety of sizes or conditions of samples than Johan Kjeldahl's original method. Kjeldahl equipment is used extensively all over the world.

== Literature ==
- Jessen-Hansen, H. (1932) Johan Kjeldahl, pp. 169–172 in: Meisen, V. Prominent Danish Scientists through the Ages. University Library of Copenhagen 450th Anniversary. Levin & Munksgaard, Copenhagen.
