= Frederik Christopher Krohn =

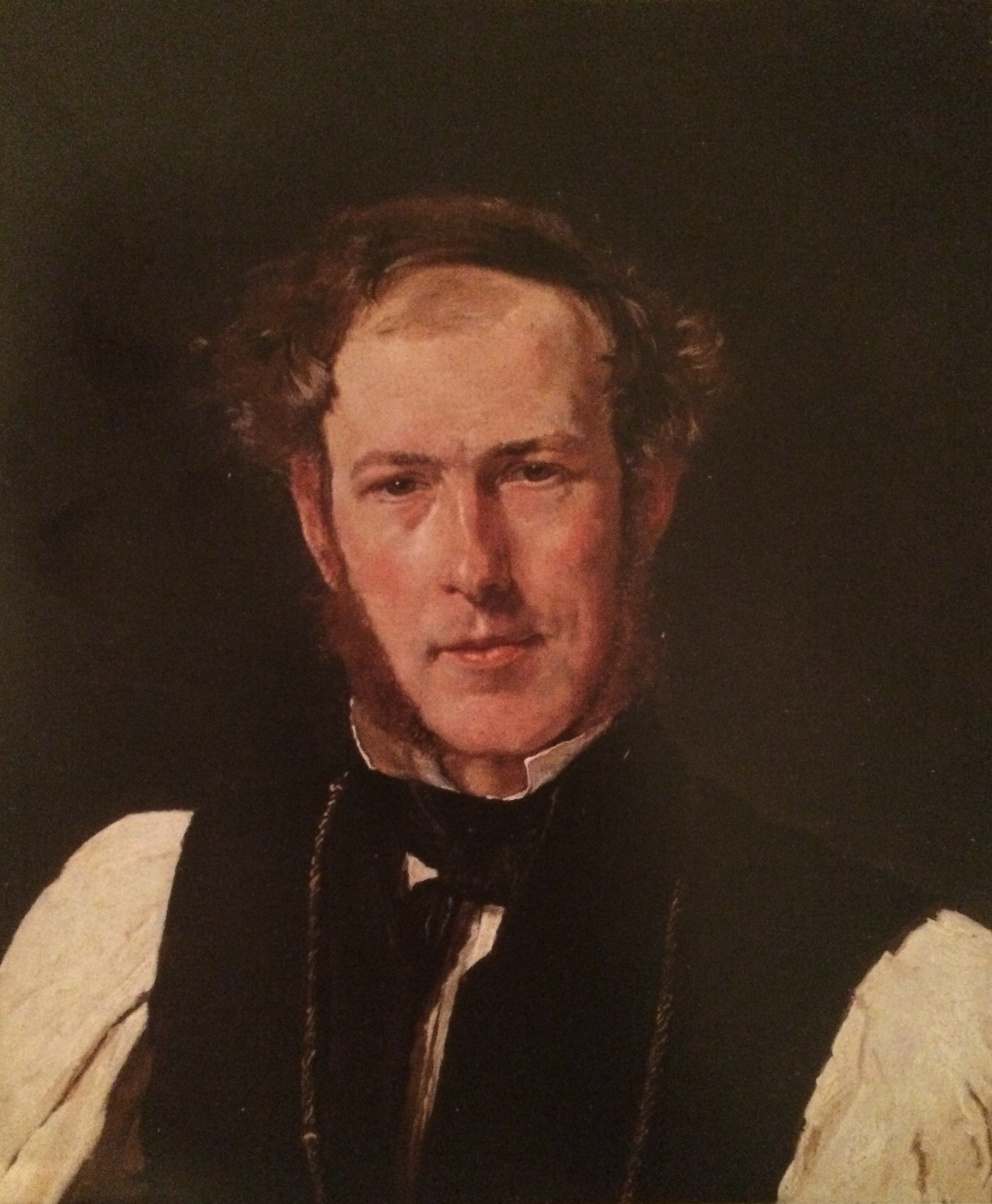
- Born: 4 August 1806; Sorø, Denmark
- Died: 13 September 1883 (aged 77); Copenhagen, Denmark
- Known for: Medal engraver

Frederik Christopher Krohn (4 August 1806 – 13 September 1883), also known as Frits Krohn, was a Danish sculptor and medallist. He was the father of painter and museum director Pietro Krohn.

== Early life and education ==
Krohn was born on 4 August 1806 on the Møllegård estate at Sorø, the son of artillery major Johan Jakob Krohn and Maren Rasmussen.

He studied sculpture at the Royal Danish Academy of Fine Arts from 1823 and trained as a medal engraver under the guidance of H.E. Freund from 1829. He won the Academy's small silver medal in 1825, its large silver medal in 1726 and finally its large gold medal in 1835.

== Career ==
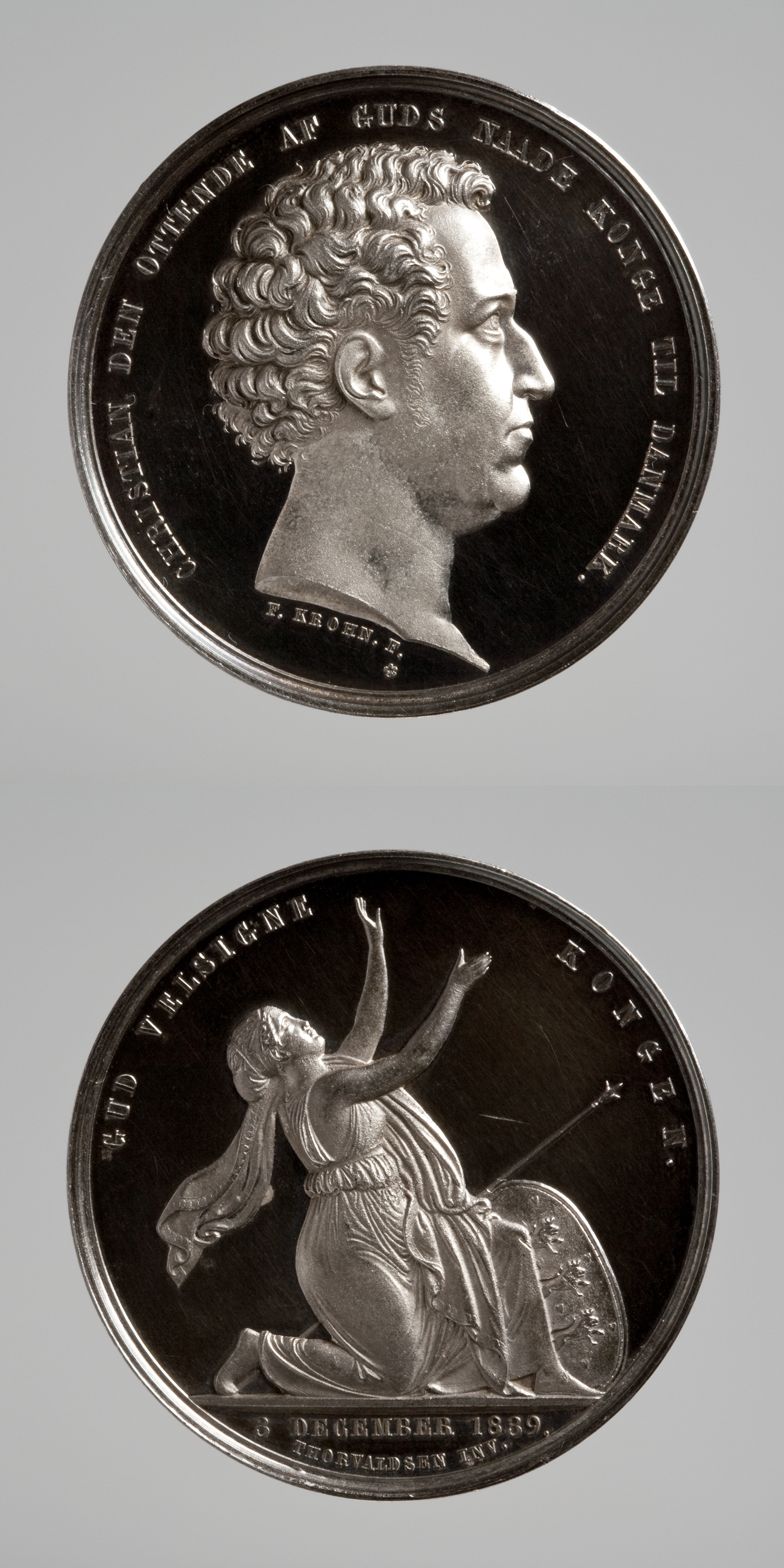
F. C. Krohn: Medal commemorating Christian VIII, 1940

Krohn worked for the Royal Mint in Copenhagen from 1841 to 1 May 1873 and then in Altona from 1841 to 1852.

== Personal life ==
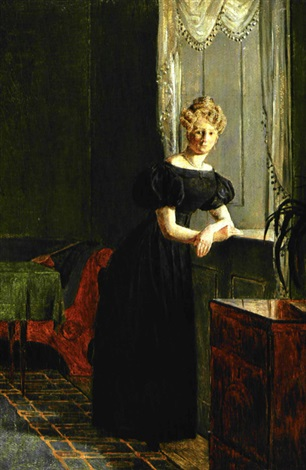
Sophie Krohn, née Købke, painted by her brother in c. 1830

Kroh married twice. His first wife was Sophie Susanne Købke (3 May 1807 - 15 July 1853), a daughter of master baker at Kastellet Peter Berendt Købke and Cecilia Margrethe Petersen. Her brother was the painter Christen Købke. They were married on 3 May 1835 and had four children Pietro Købke Krohn (1840–1905), Johan Jacob Krohn (1841–1925), Herman Freund Krohn (1843–1877) and Mario Krohn (1846–1872). They later also adopted Christen Købke's two children, Hans Peter Carl Købke and Juliane Emilie Købke, who lost their father in 1848 and their mother in 1849.

Krohn was second time married to Emilie Købke (17 July 1812 – 1 January 1880) a daughter of kancelliråd Caspar Berendt Købke and Juliane Dorothea Ratz, on 31 July 1855 in Vester Åby Church on Funen.

Krohn died on 13 September 1883 at Copenhagen Municipal Hospital. He is buried in Assistens Cemetery.

== See also ==
- Harald Conradsen
- Peter Leonhard Gianelli
