= Jens Peter Dahl-Jensen =

Danish sculptor (1874–1960)

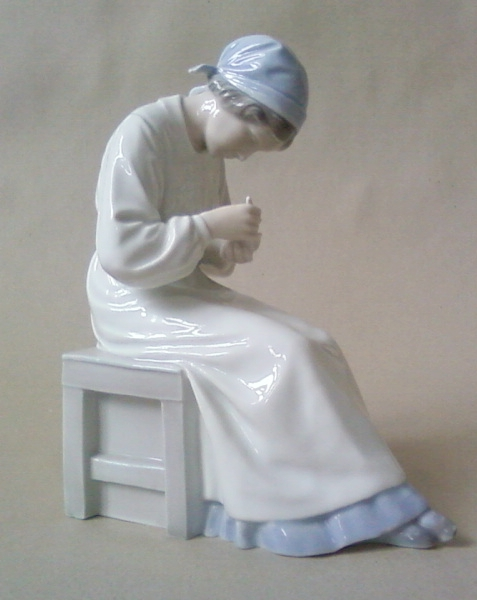
Porcelain painter, 1915, Bing & Grøndahl

Jens Peter Dahl-Jensen ( 23 July 1874 – 12 December 1960) was a Danish sculptor.

== Biography ==
Dahl-Jensen was born at Nibe in Jutland, Denmark. He was the son of Anders Peter Jensen and Karen Kirstine Dahl. Born Jens Peter Jensen, in 1926 he changed his surname from Jensen to Dahl-Jensen. In 1900 he married Martha Elisabeth Bertha Haugaard (1871-1960).

The son of a cabinet maker, he was initially apprenticed to a joiner in Aalborg and won a silver medal for his exemplary work. During this period he learnt to carve in wood and became interested in sculpture. From 1894 to 1897, Dahl-Jensen studied at the Royal Danish Academy of Fine Arts in Copenhagen. On his vacations he travelled to Berlin and Dresden. After his final academy examination, he did additional studies in Switzerland and Italy.

From 1897 to 1917, he was a model master of the porcelain company Bing & Grøndahl in Copenhagen and from 1917 to 1925 he was the artistic director of the porcelain factory Norden, also in Copenhagen.

Between 1901 and 1925 Dahl-Jensen modelled numerous small sculptures of beasts of prey in bronze that were exhibited at Charlottenborg, Malmö, Berlin, Munich and San Francisco, but he became increasingly famous for his work in porcelain, especially animal figurines for Bing & Grøndahl. He was the busiest animal sculptor of his company, some of his Art Nouveau figurines are still produced by Royal Copenhagen.

In 1925 he started his own business, Dahl-Jensen Porcelainfabrik in the Husum suburb of Copenhagen. It exported a lot, mainly to the United States and Italy. In addition to animal figures, he modeled some unusual oriental figurines with deep and strong lower glazes, from 1930 to 1958. Both Dahl-Jensen and his wife died in Copenhagen during 1960 and were buried at Bronshoj Cemetery. Their son Georg Dahl-Jensen (1901-1974) continued the production. The company closed down in 1985.

== Other sources ==
- Anton M. Jensen (1965) Fra Fjerne Lande fortalt i porcelaen af Dahl-Jensen (København: Dahl-Jensens Porcelænsfabrik)
- Caroline Pope, Nick Pope (2003) Dahl-Jensen Porcelain Figurines 1897–1985 (Atglen: Schiffer Publ.) ISBN 978-0-7643-1760-6.
