= Hans Tegner =

Danish artist and illustrator (1853–1932)

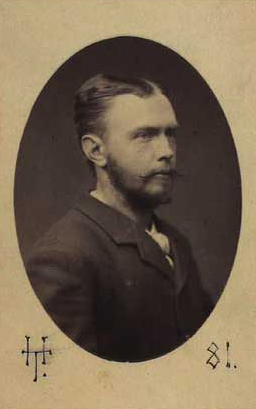
Hans Tegner in 1881. The Royal Danish Library.

Hans Christian Harald Tegner, known as Hans Tegner (30 November 1853 – 2 April 1932), was a Danish artist and illustrator. He is primarily known for his illustrations of literary works by Hans Christian Andersen and Ludvig Holberg and for his work for the Bing & Grøndahl porcelain factory.

== Early life and education ==
Son of lithographer Isac Wilhelm Tegner, Hans studied at the Royal Danish Academy of Fine Arts from 1869 to 1878.

== Career ==
His first art exhibition was in 1882, featuring watercolour illustrations of Hans Christian Andersen's story The Tinderbox. His second, and last, exhibition in 1889 was a watercolour painting celebrating the 50-year jubilee of the Constitution of Denmark, and was bought by king Christian IX of Denmark. From 1883 to 1888, Tegner painted a series of illustrations for the works of Ludvig Holberg, his greatest artistic accomplishment. The second great accomplishment of Tegner, was his exquisite illustrations produced for the so-called international selection (Danish: Verdensudgaven) of Andersen's fairy tales, finished in 1901.

Tegner was made professor at the Royal Danish Academy of Fine Arts in 1897. He illustrated a number of other books, as well as postal stamps, and the first 5-Danish krone note in 1898. He was the leader of Kunsthåndværkerskolen (a part of what is now Danmarks Designskole) from 1901 to 1917, and chief designer at porcelain manufacturer Bing & Grøndahl from 1907 to 1932. He died on 2 April 1932 in Fredensborg.

== Personal life ==
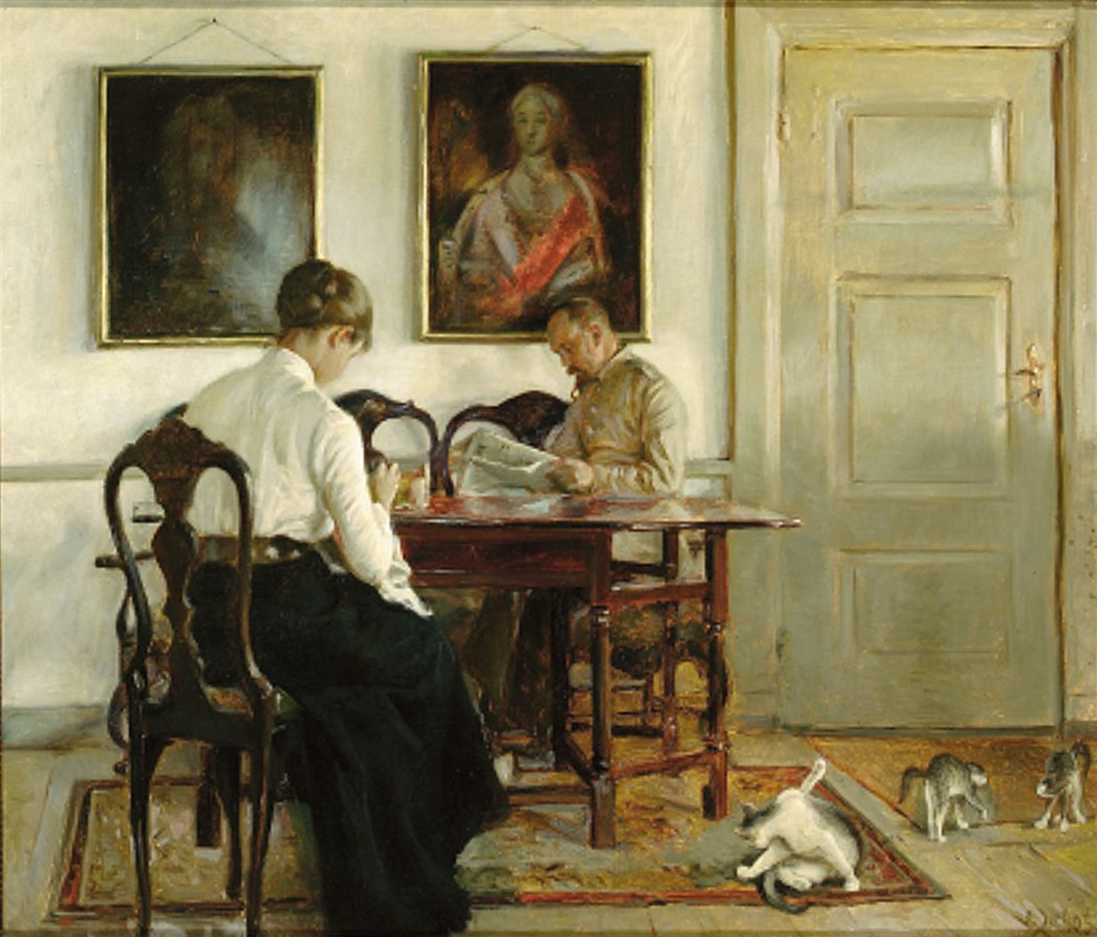
Valdemar Irminger: Interior with Helga and Hans Tegner, 1903

Tegner married Helga Byberg (13 January 1862 - 26 February 1945), a daughter of merchant Ole Strib Hansen Byberg (1812–82) and Karen Møller (1821–89), on 24 November 1896 in Sundby.

He died on 2 April 1932 and is buried in Asminderød Cemetery
