= Harald Conradsen =

Danish sculptor (1817–1905)

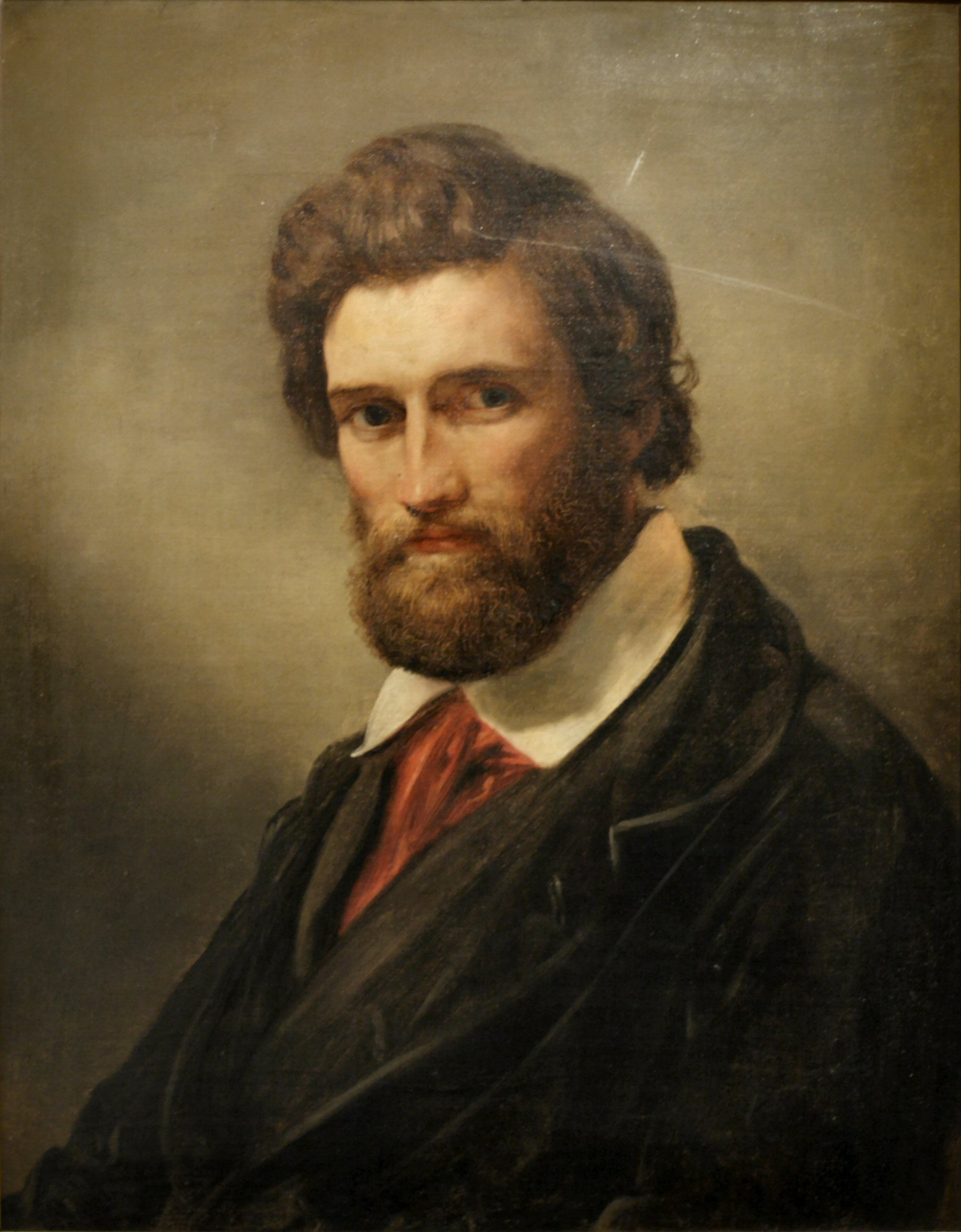
- Conradsen painted by Elisabeth Jerichau Baumann
- Born: 17 November 1817; Copenhagen, Denmark
- Died: 10 March 1905 (aged 87); Copenhagen, Denmark
- Known for: Medallist and sculptor

Harald Conradsen (17 November 1817 – 10 March 1905) was a Danish sculptor and medallist. He was chief medallist at the Royal Mint from 1873 to 1901. Other works by Conradsen include the Royal Danish Academy of Fine Arts' Eckersberg Medal and the University of Copenhagen's gold medal.

== Early life and education ==
Conradsen was born on 17 November 1817 in Copenhagen, the son of court medallist Johannes Just Conradsen (1783–1856) and Dorothea Laurine Møller (1784 Odense –1874 Copenhagen). Conradsen attended the Royal Danish Academy of Fine Arts from 1822. He won both the academy's small and large silver medal followed by the small gold medal in 1843 for the relief Boas og Ruth and the large gold medal in 1845 for Hektors Afsked med Andromache. He was at the same time trained as a medallist under H. E. Freund.

== Career ==
Conradsen's first work as a medallist was the medal Pro meritis. He was the following year awarded the Neuhausen Prize for his model for a speciedaler coin and was subsequently commissioned to engrave the stamps for Christian VIII's speciesdaler.

He was upon his father's retirement in 1841 employed as assistant medallist under Frederik Christopher Krohn at the Royal Mint.

In 1846–50, he went abroad on the academy's large travel stipend. During his stay in Rome he worked on two medals to Bertel Thorvaldsen and Adam Oehlenschläger. The Oehlenschläger medal was his reception piece for the academy of which he became a member on 10 March 1851.

He succeeded Krohn as royal medallist in 1873. His signature: "H·C". He retired in 1901.

== Works ==
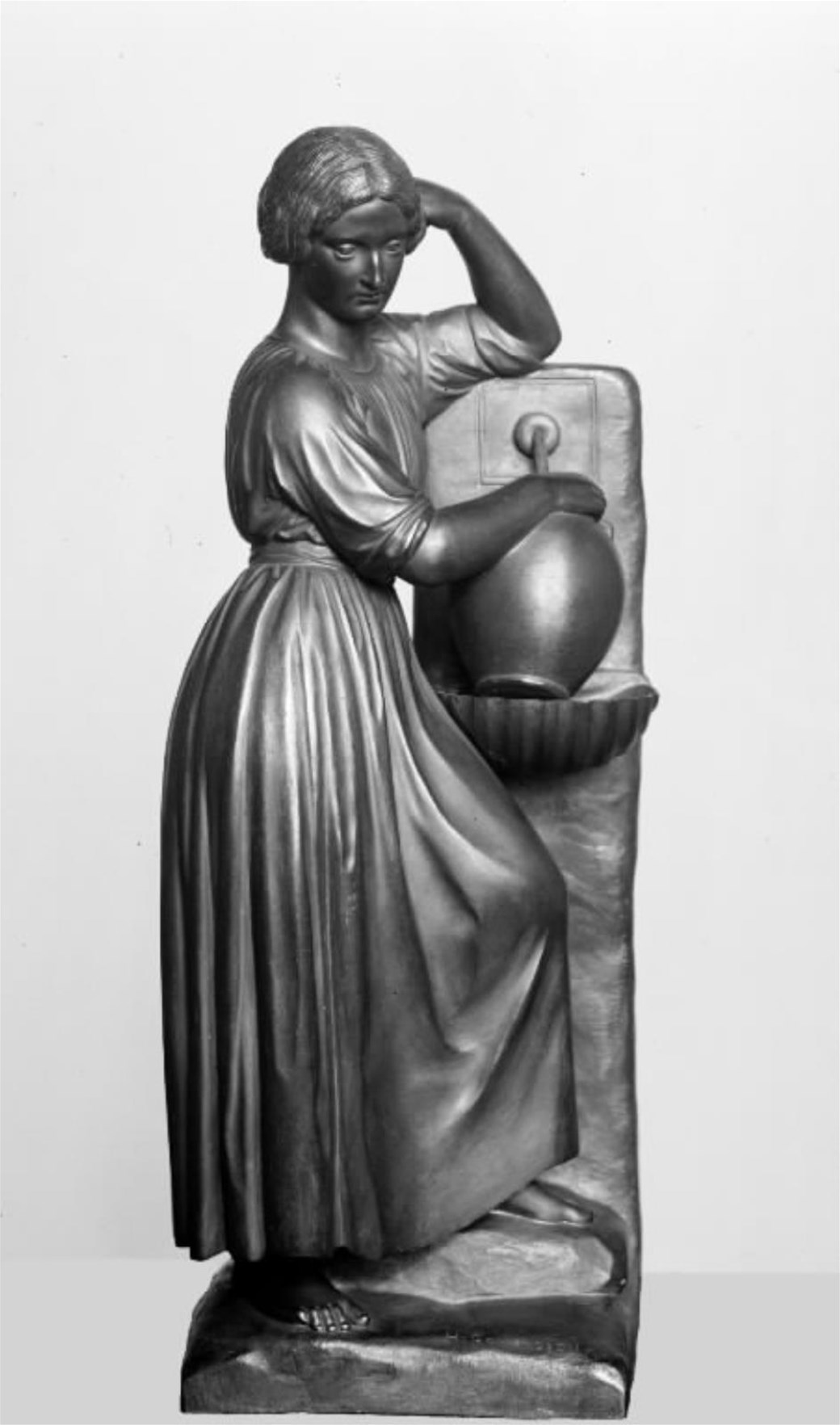
Girl by the Well, 1855

Conradsen's most notable works as a sculptor are En Pige, som henter Vand (Danish National Gallery) and Evangelisten Marcus for Christiansborg Cjapel in Copenhagen.

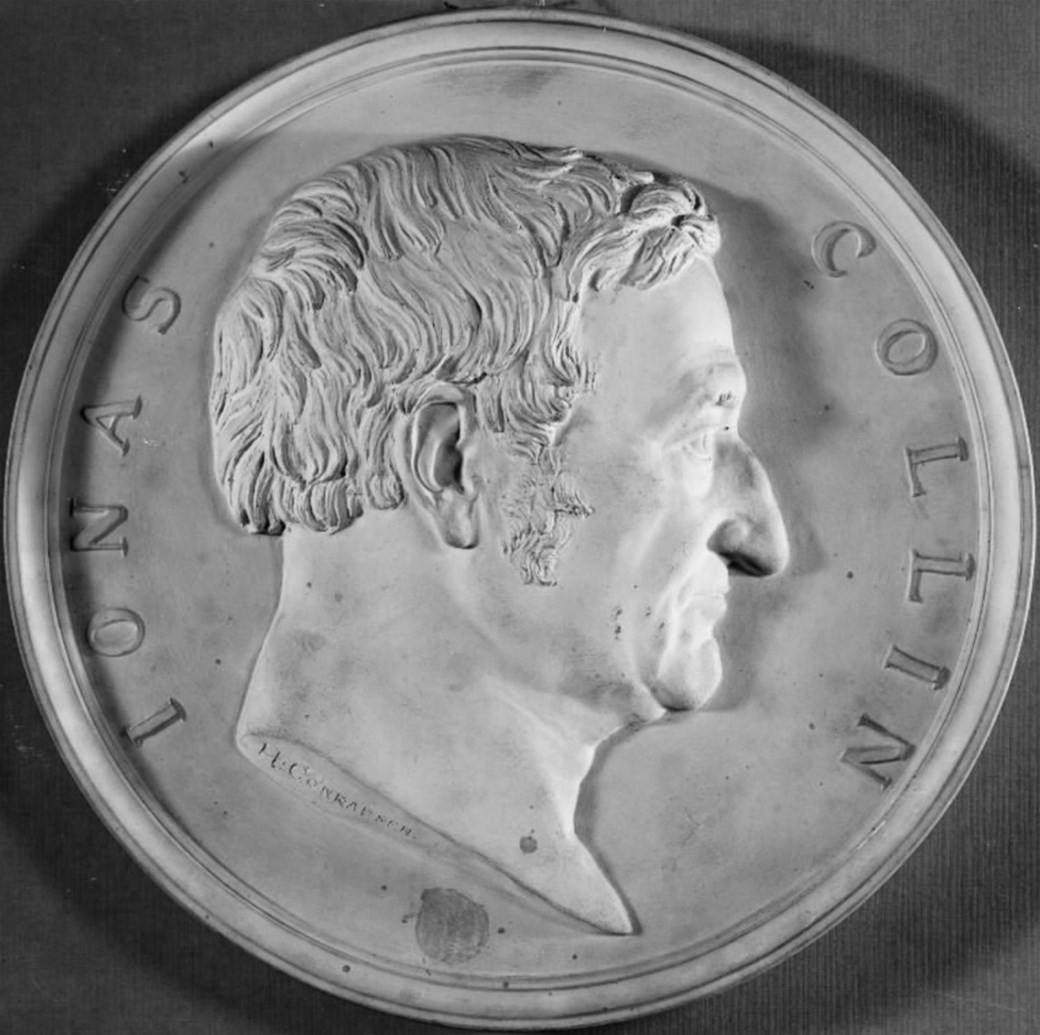
Conradsen's Jonas Collin medal, 1855

He also created a large number of models for figurines of Thorvaldsen's work for the Royal Porcelain Factory and assisted his friend and colleague Jens Adolf Jerichau in his work.

He created a total of 28 medals. Among these are memorial medals to Jonas Collin (1860), N.F.S. Grundtvig (1861), Princess Alexandra (1863), Henrik Nikolai Krøyer (1870), Madvig (1879) and Christoffer Wilhelm Eckersberg (1883) as well as the University of Copenhagen's medal (1866), Fourth Centenary of Christopher Columbus (1892).

== Personal life ==
Conradsen married Regine Louise Ørgaard (7 July 1816 – 22 April 1900), a daughter of coffee merchant Svend Vilhelm Ørgaard (ca. 1761 – 1832) and Anna Kirstine Altevelt (ca. 1777 – 1868), on 17 November 1850 in the Church of Our Saviour in Copenhagen.

He died in 1905 and is buried at Assistens Cemetery.

== Gallery ==
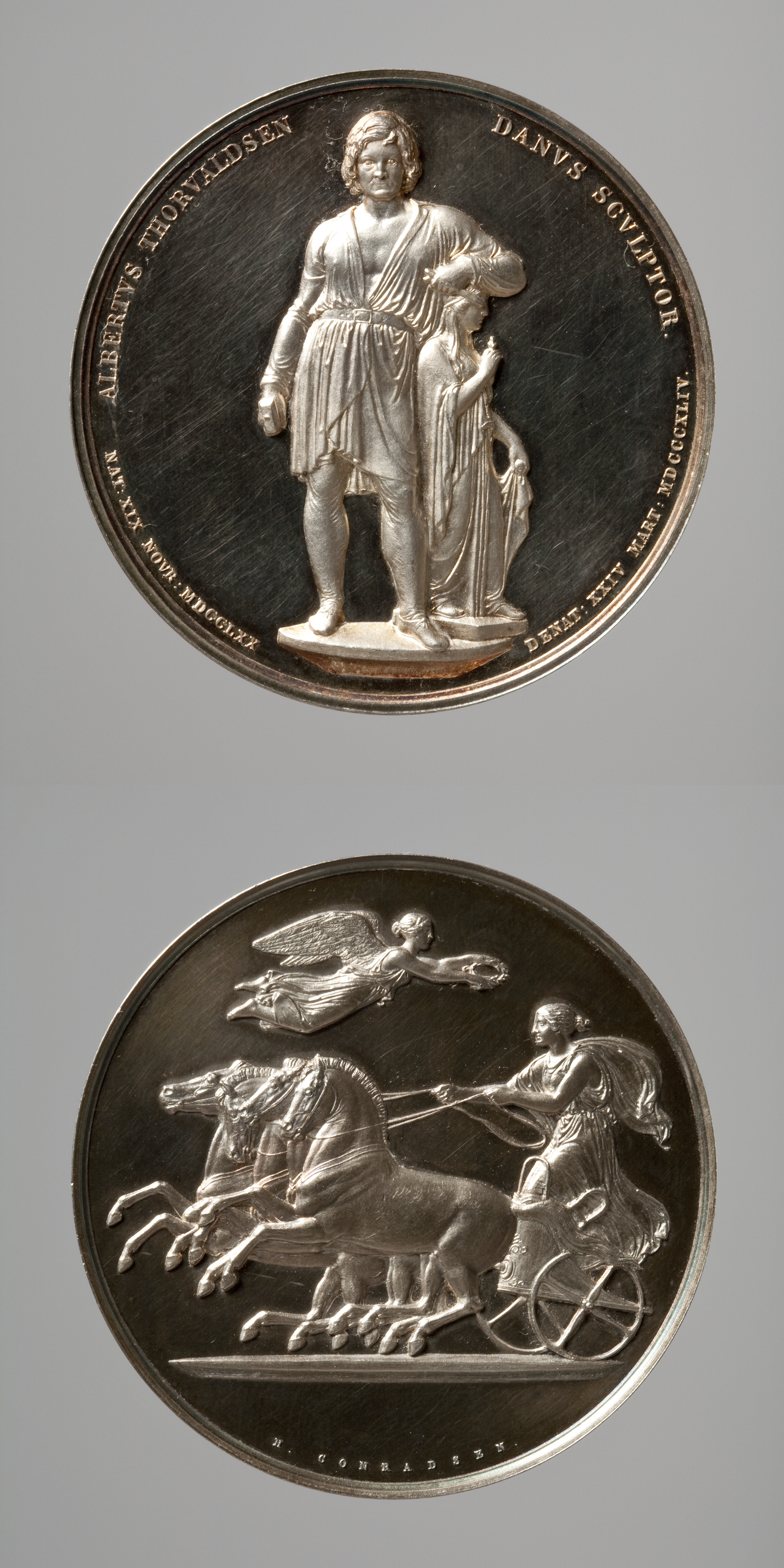
Medal to Bertel Thorvaldsen (1849)

== See also ==
- Christen Christensen (sculptor)

== Honours ==
Conradsen was created a Knight in the Order of the Dannebrog in 1860. He was awarded the Medal of Honour in 1890 and created a Commander in the Order of the Dannebrog in 1901.
