= Gertrud Vasegaard =

Gertrud Vasegaard, née Hjorth, (23 February 1913 – 7 July 2007) was a Danish ceramist, remembered above all for her tea set (1956) which was included in the Danish Culture Canon. A designer for Bing & Grøndahl and Royal Copenhagen, she also had her own workshop where she collaborated with her daughter Myre.

== Early life and family ==
Vasegaard was the granddaughter of Lauritz Hjorth, who in 1859 founded the Bornholm pottery factory in Rønne, and the daughter of Hans Hjorth, who later managed it together with his brother Peter. Johanne Tvede Bruhn, her mother, was a painter. After leaving school in 1927, she began decorating the brown, unglazed pottery produced by the factory. In 1930, she studied in the ceramics department of the Arts and Crafts School which had just opened in Copenhagen. In parallel, she furthered her education by working with the ceramist Christian Poulsen (1911–1991) and with Arne Bang (1901–1983) at the Holmegaard Glass Factory. Two years later she left the school to become an apprentice at the new workshop run by Axel Salto (1889–1961) and Bode Willumsen (1895–1987).

== Career ==
In 1933, Vasegaard returned to Bornholm where she opened a studio in Gudhjem together with her sister Lisbeth. They produced pottery and ceramics, exhibiting in Copenhagen the same year.

In 1938, Vasegaard moved to Holkadalen near Gudhjem with her husband Sigurd (whom she had married in 1935) and her daughter Myre. Here she produced earthenware mugs and bowls with an ornamental look which was to form the basis of her later work with stoneware. In 1945, on the initiative of Aksel Rode and as a result of the difficulty of obtaining supplies after the war, she began working for Bing & Grøndahl during the winter, returning to her Bornholm workshop for the rest of the year. In 1949, she became a full-time employee of the factory where she remained for the next 10 years, specializing in stoneware. It soon became one of the firm's most successful products, opening up a new era for Danish design. Her preferred finishes were light green, clear off-white, light blue and jade. Of particular note is her tea set (1956) with a hexagonal teapot and cups without handles, perfectly adapted to industrial production. Her three porcelain dinner sets (1961–1975) which she designed for Royal Copenhagen were also successful. The Capella set was undecorated, Gemina had a blue decoration without glaze while Gemma had a stamped decoration.

At the end of 1958, she left Bing & Grøndahl and, together with Rode (whom she married in 1961) and her daughter, set up a new workshop in Frederiksberg. Years of fruitful collaboration followed, especially between mother and daughter who worked alone from 1969. Vasegaard's mugs, bowls and covered dishes with geometrical patterns were not only popular in Denmark but became internationally recognized.

== Style ==
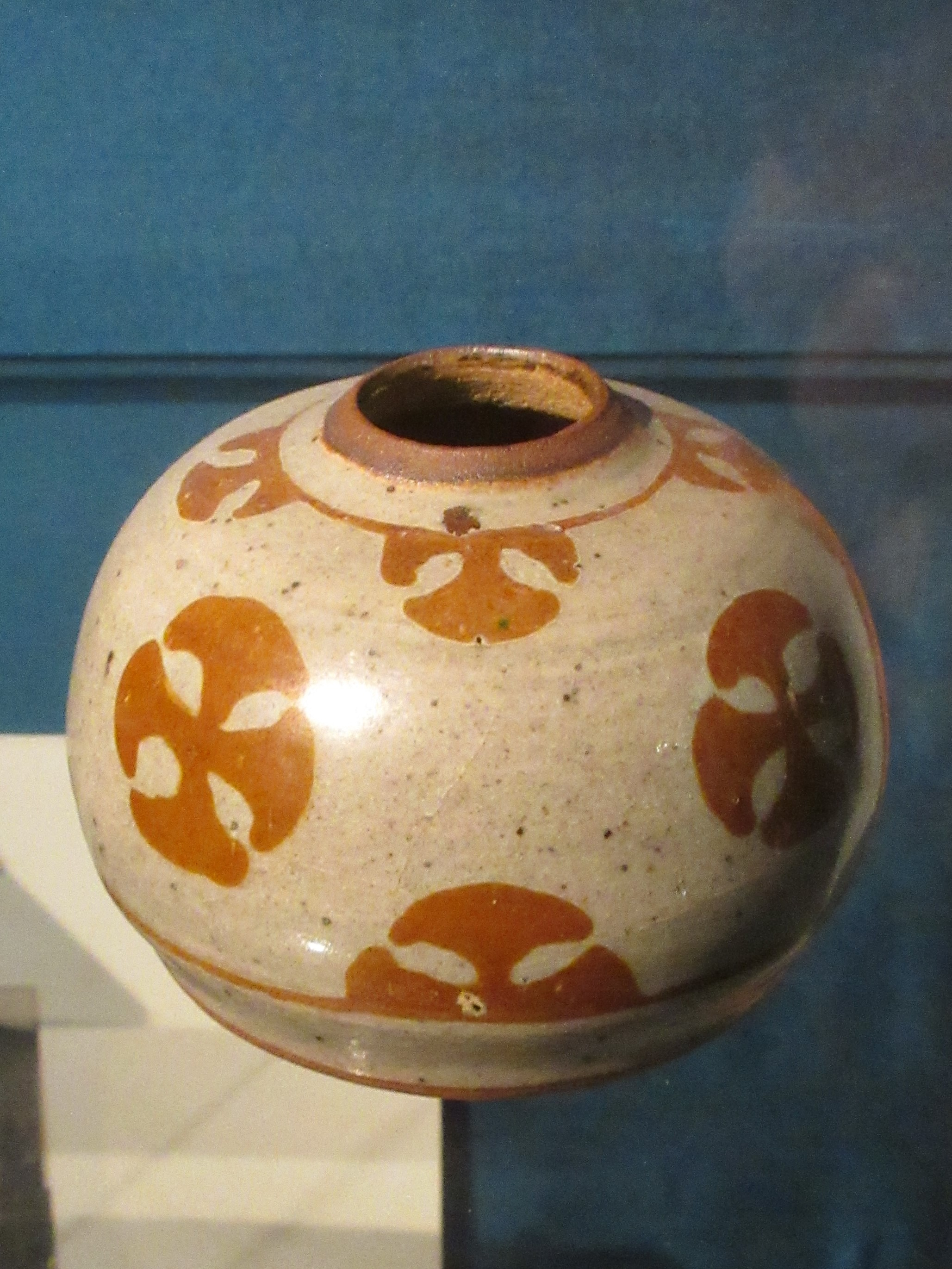
Vase by Vasegaard from the 1950s. Danish Design Museum, 2018.

Vasegaard's functional stoneware bowls and vases are lightly coloured and simply decorated with restrained patterns such as stripes and checks or rows of stepped lines. Many of her items are large simply-designed pieces, frequently unglazed, with geometrical decorations where a few brush-strokes emphasize the form. In this way, her stoneware achieved a unique level of strength and sensitivity in Danish ceramics.

== Awards ==
Vasegaard was awarded a gold medal at the Milan Triennale in 1957, the Eckersberg Medal in 1963, the Kunsthåndværkerrådets Årspris (annual prize for arts and crafts) in 1979, the Thorvald Bindesbøll Medal and the Swedish Prince Eugen Medal in 1981, and the C. F. Hansen Medal in 1992.
