= Otto Haslund =

Danish painter

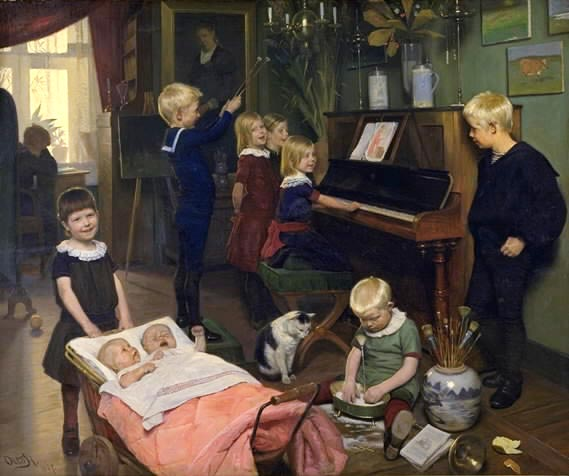
Concert (1887)

Carl Otto Bentzon Haslund (4 November 1842 – 30 August 1917) was a Danish painter. He is remembered in particular for his paintings of animals and children.

== Biography ==
Born in Copenhagen, Haslund attended the Royal Danish Academy of Fine Arts from 1858 to 1864. In addition he studied privately under Wilhelm Marstrand, Jørgen Roed and P.C. Skovgaard and also spent some time working in Vilhelm Kyhn's studio (c. 1866).

Haslund's early work bears traces of the Danish Golden Age approach to painting thanks to his friendship with Christen Købke's nephew, Pietro Krohn while his studies under Marstrand and Vermehren developed his respect for clarity and detail. Haslund was one of a group of artists who tried to maintain the traditional Danish approach to painting at a time when new styles were being introduced.

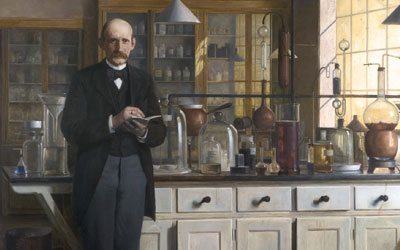
Johan Kjeldahl in His Laboratory

Inspired by J.Th. Lundbye, he painted sensitive pictures of animals. The periods he spent in Italy from 1873 to 1875 and from 1877 to 1879 together with Kristian Zahrtmann encouraged him to take up genre and figure painting, often with a humoristic touch reminiscent of Marstrand, which Zahrtmann thought suited him better.

After being introduced to the work of Jules Breton and Jules Bastien-Lepage while he was in Paris in 1881, Haslund steered away from the Danish academic style, painting more Realistic portraits, for example of Janus la Cour (1892), and landscapes, using far more vivid colours.

He became well known for his paintings of children in the late 1880s, especially Concert (1887) considered a masterpiece in Danish Realism, and in the early 1890s, he painted portraits of those working at the Carlsberg brewery in Copenhagen. He exhibited at the Charlottenborg Spring Exhibition from 1865 to 1916.

Haslund was also an illustrator; together with Pietro Krohn, he illustrated Johan Krohn's Peters Jul (1866). He also ran a painting school which was popular with women.

== Awards ==
In 1887, Otto Haslund was awarded the Thorvaldsen Medal. In 1906, he was decorated as a Commander of the Order of the Dannebrog.
