= Ingeborg Plockross Irminger =

Danish sculptor

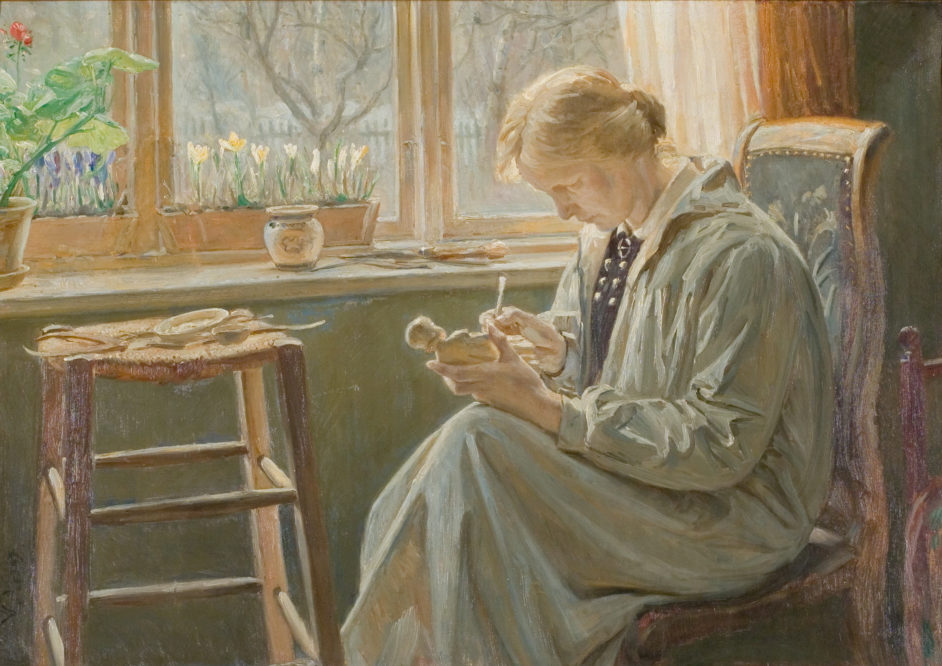
Ingeborg Plockross Irminger painted by Valdemar Irminger, 1909

Ingeborg Plockross Irminger (1872–1962) was a Danish artist who is remembered both for her sculptures and for the miniature porcelain statues of animals and human figures she designed while working for Bing & Grøndahl. A bronze cast of her 1903 bust of the writer Herman Bang was installed on Sankt Annæ Plads in Copenhagen in 2012.

== Early life ==
Born in the Frederiksberg district of Copenhagen on 18 June 1872, Plockross Irminger was the daughter of the merchant Johannes Frederik Plockross (1821–96) and Cathrine Frederikke Tietgen (1833–91). After showing interest in modelling from an early age, she began her studies under the sculptor Aksel Hansen before attending the art school run by Emilie Mundt and Marie Luplau. In February 1893 Plockross Irminger was admitted to the Royal Danish Academy of Fine Arts where she studied sculpture under August Saabye until 1899 when she worked for a number of years in Vilhelm Bissen's studio. In 1908, she married the painter Valdemar Irminger.

== Career as a sculptor ==
Irminger first exhibited at the Charlottenborg Spring Exhibition in 1897 with En Spæd, a bronze relief. She continued to exhibit there until 1952, especially from 1904 to 1925. She also occasionally exhibited at the Kvindelige Kunstneres Samfund (Female Artists' Society) from 1920 to 1961. Her work was presented at the 1900 Paris Exhibition, at the 1914 Baltic Exhibition in Malmö and at the 1927 Danish National Exhibition in Brooklyn. Thanks to grants from the Academy, she went on study trips to Paris, Germany and Italy.

Under Bissen's guidance, Irminger developed her own style bordering on Naturalism. Among her principal creations are Drengen og Pinfsvinet (The Boy and the Hedgehog, 1899 and bronze 1911), Yngling (Youth, marble, 1909), awarded the Academy's medal of the year, and Ung Pige (marble, 1907) which is reminiscent of Ludvig Brandstrup. She also created portraits of J.F. Willumsen (relief, 1900), Herman Bang (bronze, 1904) and Ludvig Brandstrup (1922). She also created two fine bronzes of her husband in 1912 and 1919, characterized by a still, rather introvert look.

Also of interest are the decorative funeral urns and the figurines she designed while at Bing & Grøndahl's from 1898 to 1925. Of special note are her Moder og Barn (Mother and Child, 1902), Læsende Børn (Children Reading, 1903), and Ung Pige med Kat (Young Girl with Cat, 1911). The figures became very popular. Many were acquired by museums in Berlin and Dresden. They are still produced today, faithfully reproduced from Irminger's original designs.

Ingeborg Plockross Irminger died in Copenhagen on 25 October 1962.
