= Tea service (Vasegaard) =

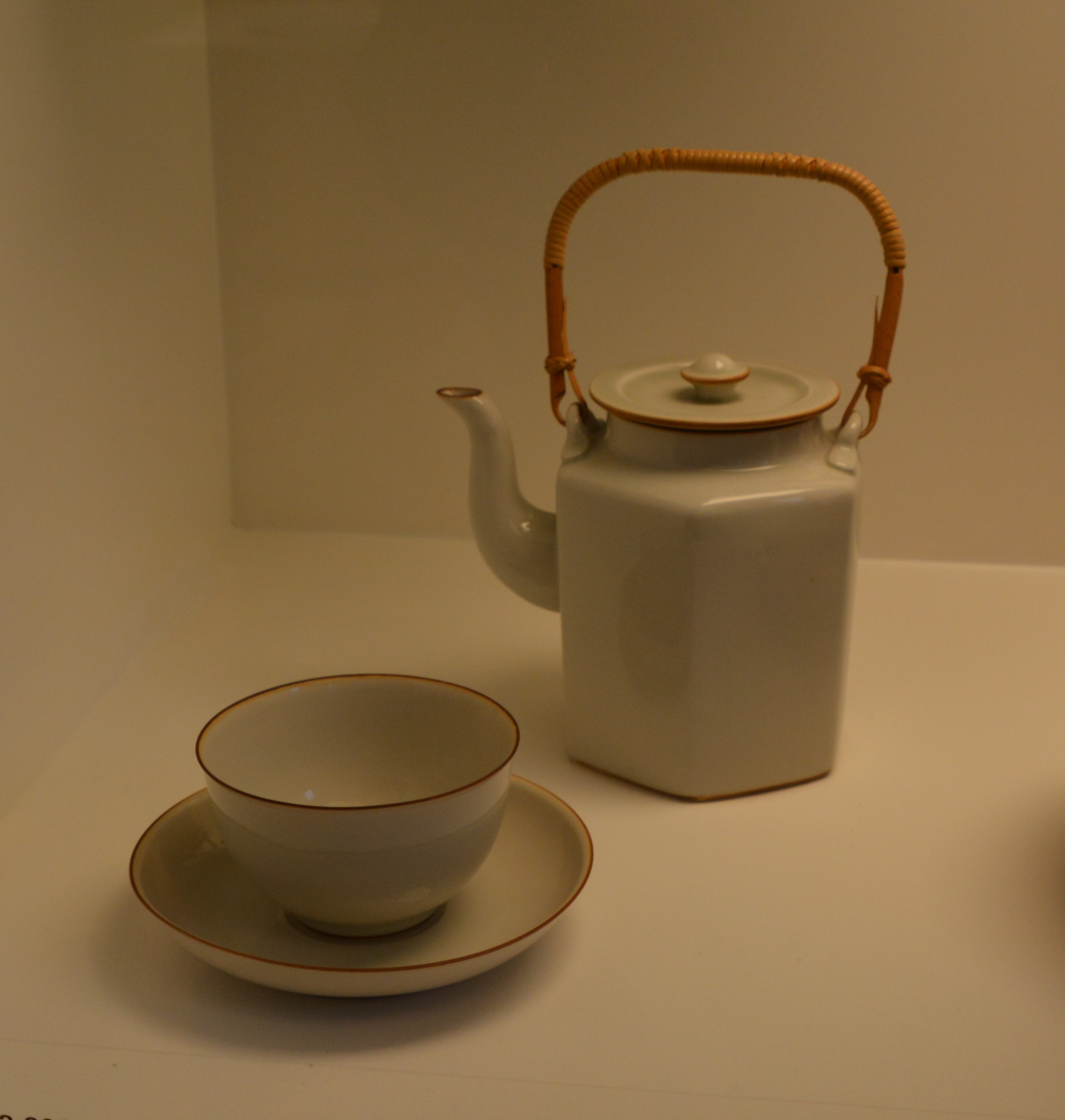
Part of Vasegaard's 1956 tea service

The tea service designed by Gertrud Vasegaard in 1956 was inspired by Chinese ceramics, most evident in its cups without handles. Produced by Bing & Grøndahl, it was included in the 2006 Danish Culture Canon as a masterpiece of Danish design.

It was while Vasegaard was working at Bing & Grøndahl that she developed an interest in Chinese ceramics. Combining her knowledge of traditional Danish designs with those of China, she created a cup without a handle and a teapot with a flat, inwardly-curved lid and cane handle, both inspired by Chinese models. She also produced a tea caddy, uncommon in Denmark but part of the Chinese tradition, and a milk jug, based on English requirements.

The tea set consists of eight pieces. Although each is individually designed (a round cup, a hexagonal teapot, a square caddy and an octagonal cake dish), they are all obviously parts of the same set. The little spots are caused by iron particles in the clay, usually removed with a magnet. Vasegaard thought they gave the porcelain a more distinctive look and persuaded Bing & Grøndahl to leave them in. The combination of simple forms with rather heavier materials and slightly textured surfaces was a compromise between production requirements and a more natural finish. Indeed, not only was the tea service widely distributed, it was also a source of inspiration for younger designers.
