= Valdemar Irminger =

Danish painter (1850–1938)

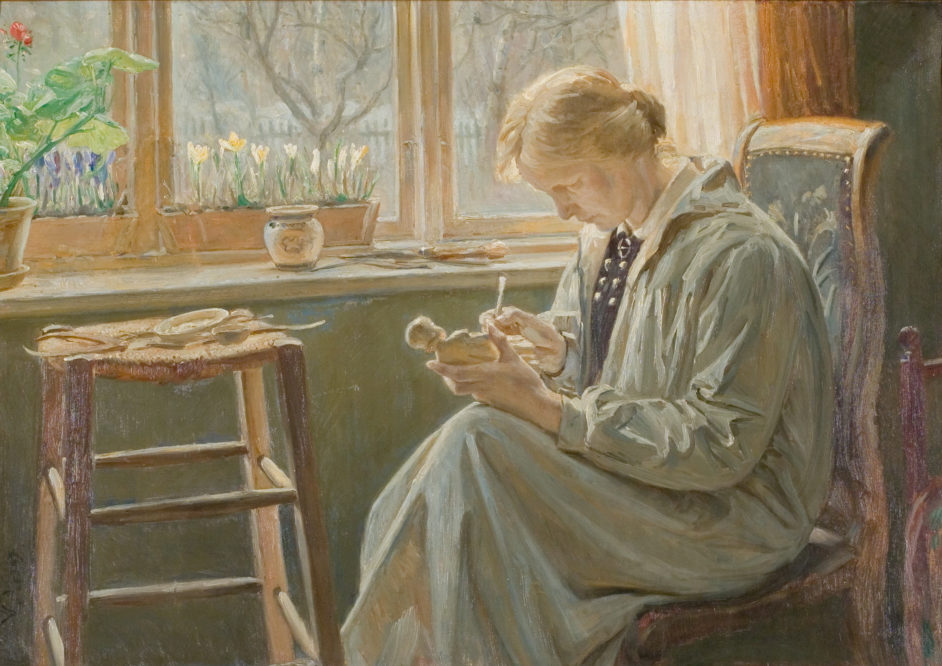
My Wife at Work,1909. A portrait of Ingeborg Plockross Irminger, the wife of Valdemar Irminger. Ribe Kunstmuseum.

Valdemar Heinrich Nicolas Irminger (29 December 1850 – 10 February 1938) was a Danish painter.

== Biography ==
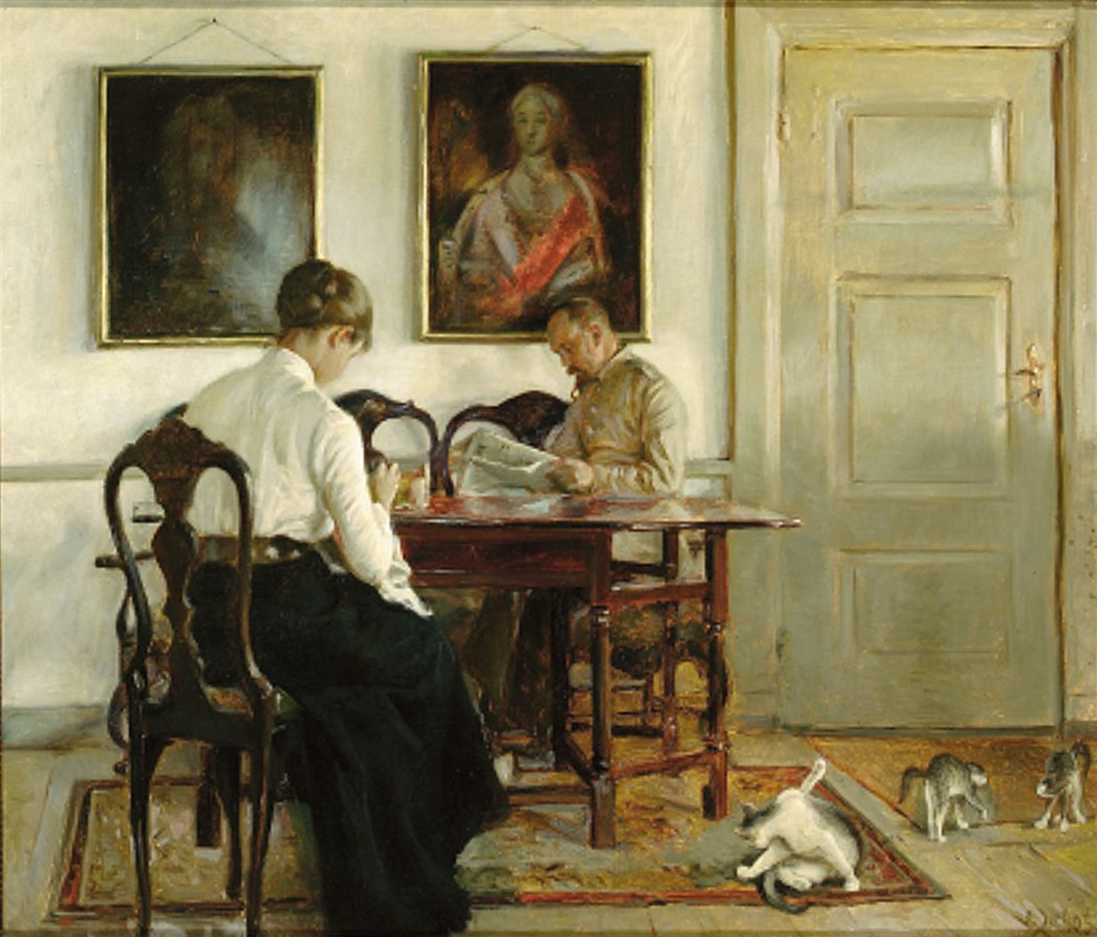
Interior with Helga and Hans Tegner, 1903

Born in Copenhagen, Irminger attended the Royal Danish Academy of Fine Arts from 1867 and 1873. He went to Italy on a scholarship from 1884 to 1887. In 1888, he won the Academy's medal for Motiv fra Børnehospitalet ved Refsnæs (View from the Children's Hospital at Refsnæs) and the following year for Fra et Børnehospital (From a Children's Hospital). His brightly-coloured open-air paintings at Refsnæs are considered to be among his finest works featuring children painted with revealing sensitivity. In 1908, he married the painter Ingeborg Plockross.

Painting initially in a Realist style, from the 1890s he turned to Romanticism. His works include portraits, religious subjects, soldiers, animals and children. Irminger taught at the Academy's school for women from 1906 where he was a professor from 1908 to 1920.

From 1875, Irminger was a regular exhibitor at Charlottenborg and served on the Charlottenborg Exhibition Committee from 1905 to 1908 and on the Procurement Committee from 1911 to 1917.

In 1908, Irminger married the Danish sculptor Ingeborg Plockross.

== Awards ==
In 1889, Irminger was awarded the Eckersberg Medal. In 1915, he was decorated with the Order of the Dannebrog and in 1925 with the Cross of Honour.
