= Carl Friedrich Irminger =

Swiss draughtsman, lithographer and engraver

- Born: November 8, 1813; Aadorf, Switzerland
- Died: March 27, 1863 (aged 49); Zurich, Switzerland
- Occupations: Draughtsman, lithographer and engraver

Signature
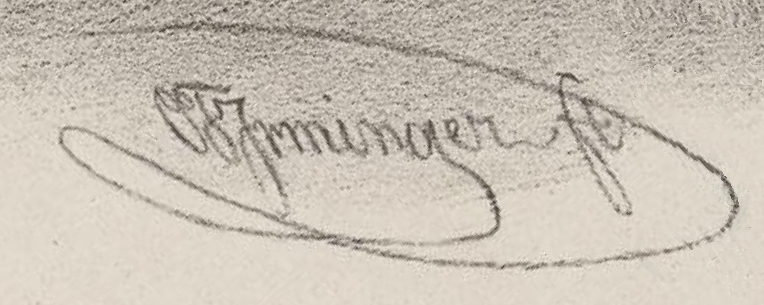

Carl Friedrich Irminger (8 November 1813 in Aadorf, Switzerland – 27 March 1863 in Zürich) was a Swiss draughtsman, lithographer and engraver.

== Life and career ==
Carl Friedrich Irminger is known for his watercolors and caricatures of Swiss military figures. In the 1850s he worked with painter and photographer Heinrich Schweikert (1830–1914) and created Irminger & Schweikert Photographic Institute in Zürich.

== Examples of work ==
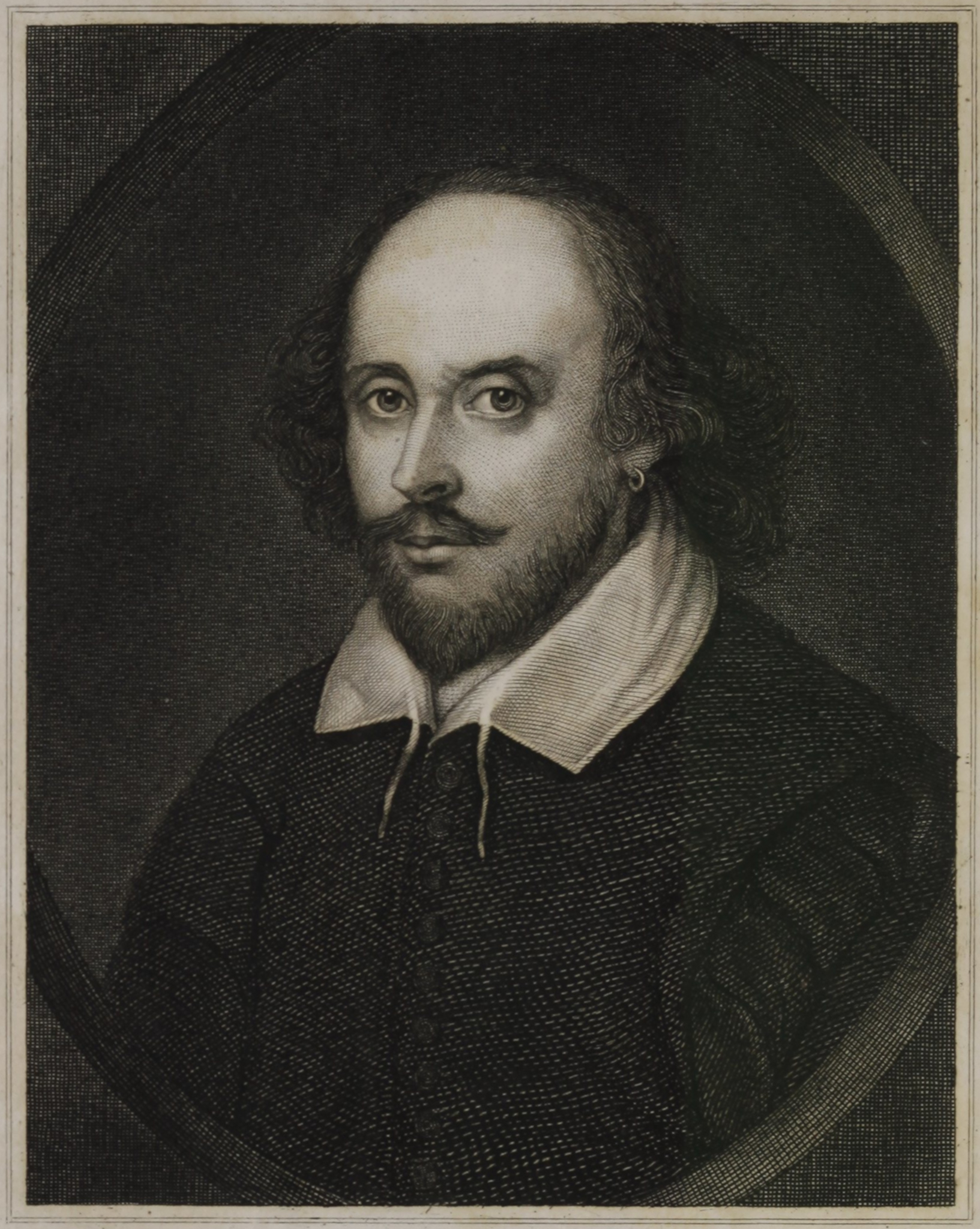
William Shakespeare

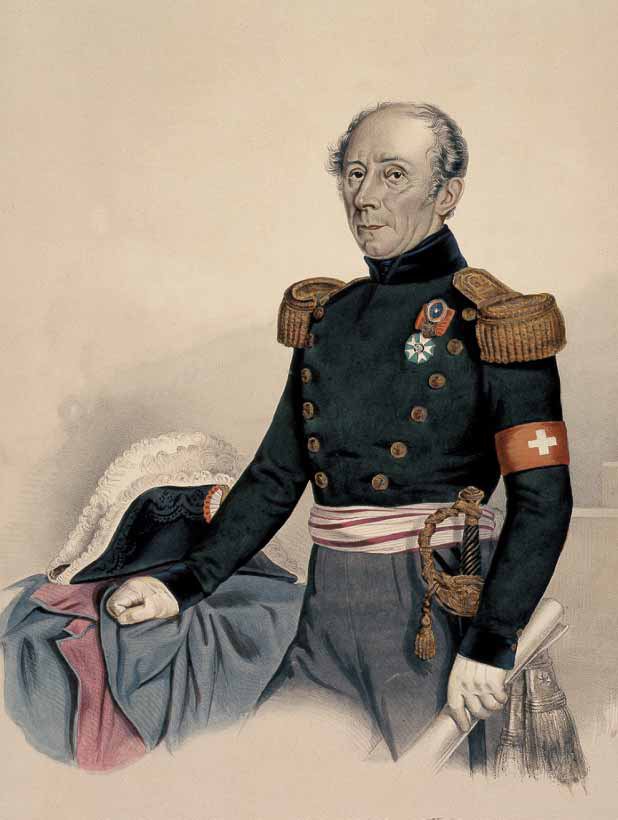
Guillaume Henri Dufour

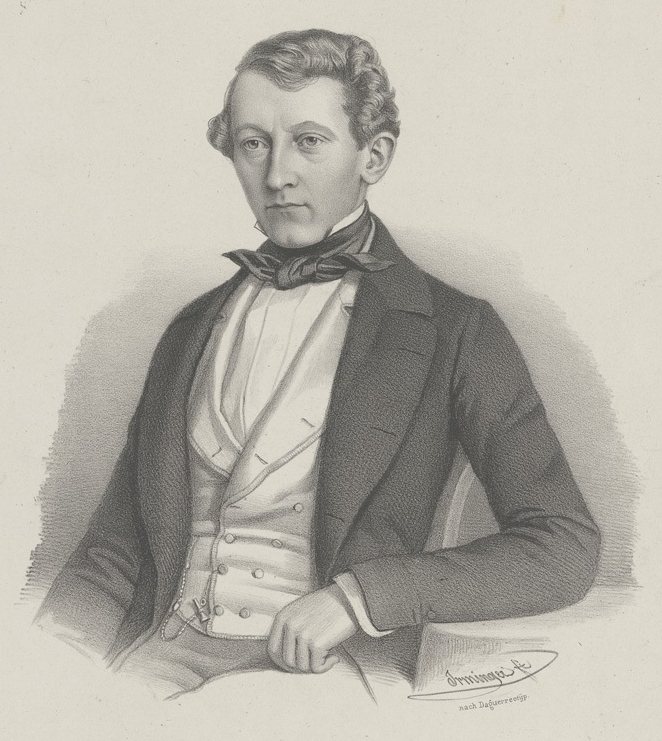
Johann Conrad Werdüller

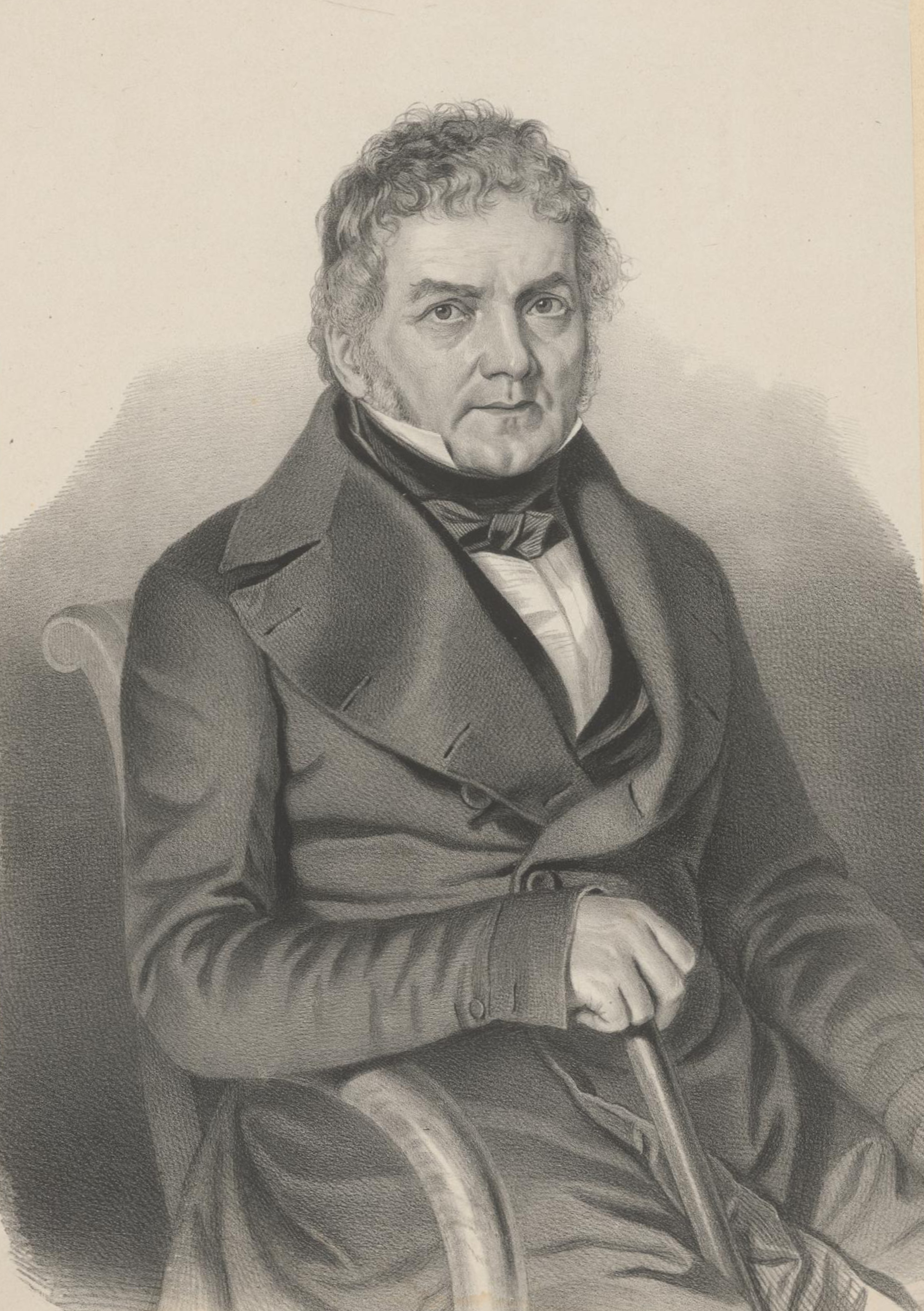
Jean-Marc Mousson
