= Pietro Krohn =

Danish painter, illustrator, theatre director and museum director

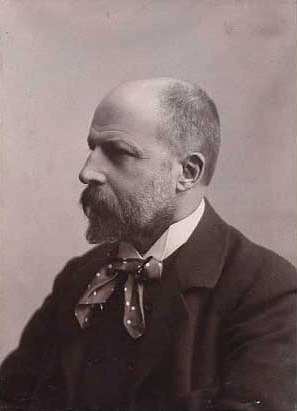
Pietro Krohn c. 1900

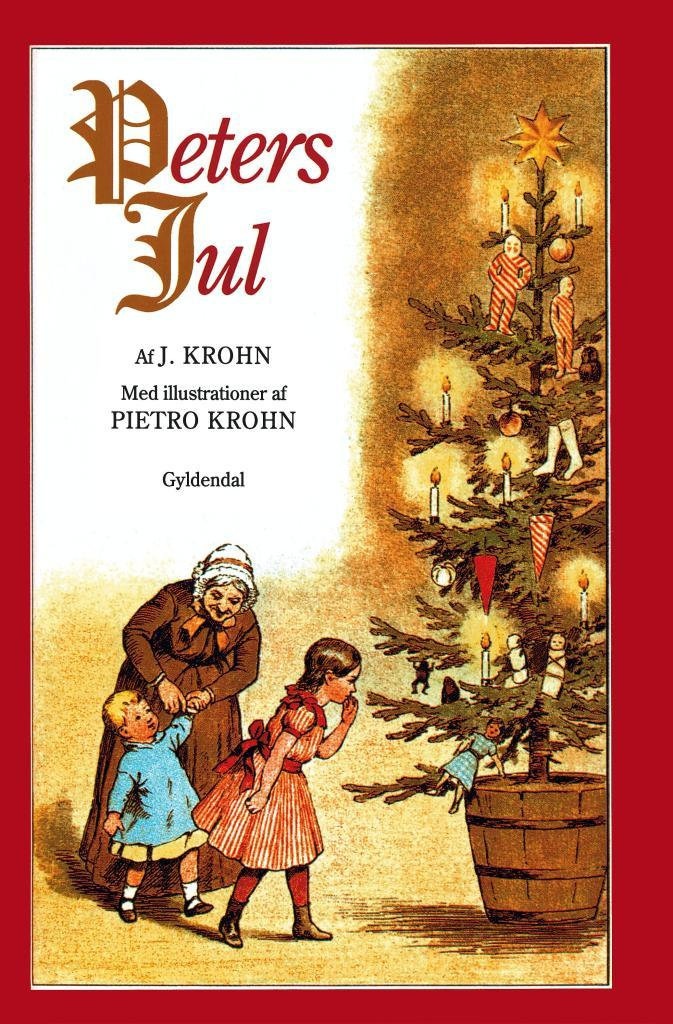
Peters Jul (1866) by Johan Jacob Krohn. illustrated by Pietro Krohn

Pietro Købke Krohn (23 January 1840 – 15 October 1905) was a Danish painter, illustrator, theatre director and museum director. He is remembered above all for his work together with Otto Haslund, illustrating Johan Krohn's book Peters Jul

== Early life and education ==
Born in Copenhagen, Denmark, he was the son of sculptor Frederik Christopher Krohn (1806–1883) and Sophie Susanne Købke (1807–1853). His younger brother was author Johan Jacob Krohn (1841–1925).

Krohn studied painting at the Royal Danish Academy of Fine Arts under Wilhelm Marstrand, Jørgen Roed and P.C. Skovgaard (1860–67). In 1871, together with Otto Haslund and Julius Lange, he traveled to Germany and the Netherlands to familiarize himself with the latest reproduction techniques. In the mid-1870s, he became a member of the Danish artists colony in Rome, associating with Thorvald Bindesbøll, Hans Friis, Axel Helsted, Carl Thomsen and Kristian Zahrtmann.

== Career ==
Krohn illustrated a number of children's books written by his brother Johan Jacob Krohn including Peters Jul (1866), Billedbog for Børn (1871) and Børnehistorier (1872). Despite further attempts to improve his painting, for example in Paris in 1878, he became more generally interested in all forms of art. From 1880 to 1893, he became a costume designer at the Royal Danish Theatre where he also directed operas. He was artistic director of the porcelain factory Bing & Grøndahl from 1885 to 1892 and, from 1893 until his death, head of the Danish Museum of Art & Design (Kunstindustrimuseet).

== Personal life ==
=== Friendship with Albert Edelfelt ===
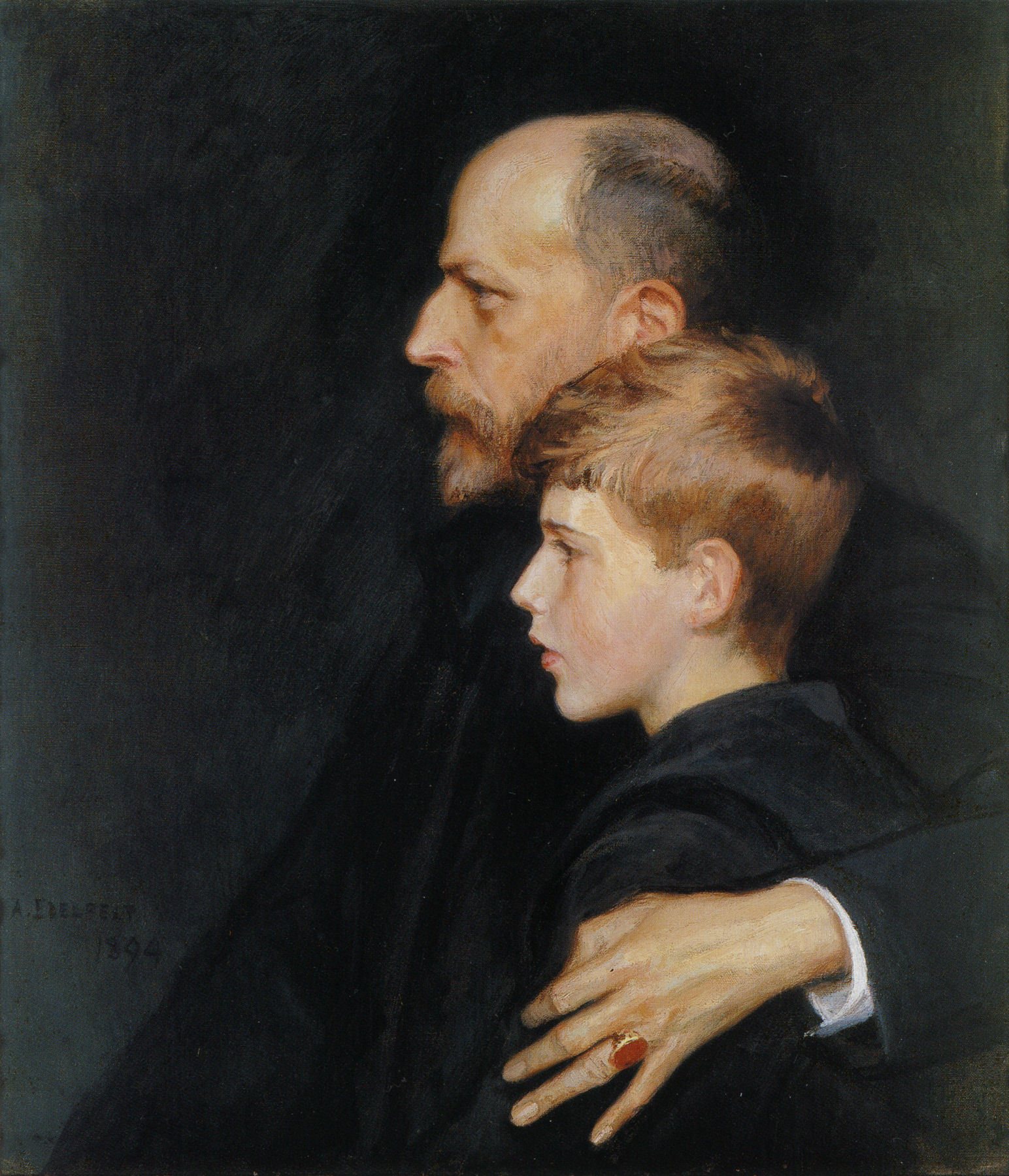
Portrait of Pietro with son Mario by Albert Edelfelt in 1894.

Krohn and the Finland Swedish artist Albert Edelfelt had a close friendship. The two artists carried on an extensive correspondence. Edelfelt portrayed Krohn and his son Mario in 1894.

== Literature ==
- Krohn, Johan; Haslund, Otto; Krohn, Pietro; H. P. Rohde (1962). Peters Jul. Med Tegninger af Otto Haslund og Pietro Krohn. tr. Skjern: Rosenkilde og Bagger.
