= Bing & Grøndahl =

Danish porcelain manufacturer

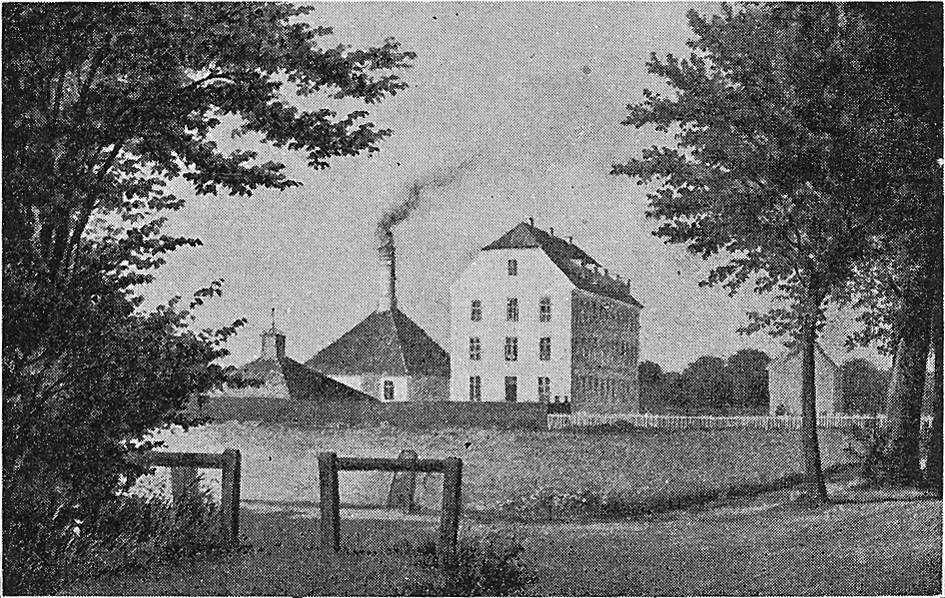
- Bing & Grøndahl's first factory, near the Vesterbrogade (1856)
- Type: Porcelain manufacturer
- Founded: 1853; 173 years ago
- Headquarters: Copenhagen, Denmark
- Website: www.royalcopenhagen.com

Bing & Grøndahl was a Danish porcelain manufacturer founded in 1853 by the sculptor Frederik Vilhelm Grøndahl and merchant brothers Meyer Hermann Bing and Jacob Herman Bing. The trademark backstamp for Bing & Grøndahl (B&G) porcelains is the three towers derived from the Coat of Arms of Copenhagen. The company's Seagull dinnerware series became known as the "National Service of Denmark" in the 1950s when it was found in one tenth of all Danish households. In 1987 the company merged with its primary competitor, the Royal Porcelain Factory under the name Royal Copenhagen.

== History ==
Bing & Grøndahl was founded on 15 April 1853 by Grøndahl, who was a figurine maker for the Royal Danish Porcelain Factory, and the Bing brothers, who were art and book dealers. The factory was located on the corner of Vesterbrogade and Rahbek Allé in the Vesterbro area, at that time outside the city of Copenhagen, Denmark. Grøndahl initially began the company to produce biscuit porcelain figurines modeled on the neoclassical sculptures of Bertel Thorvaldsen. The company extended production to include elegant tableware and coffee sets.

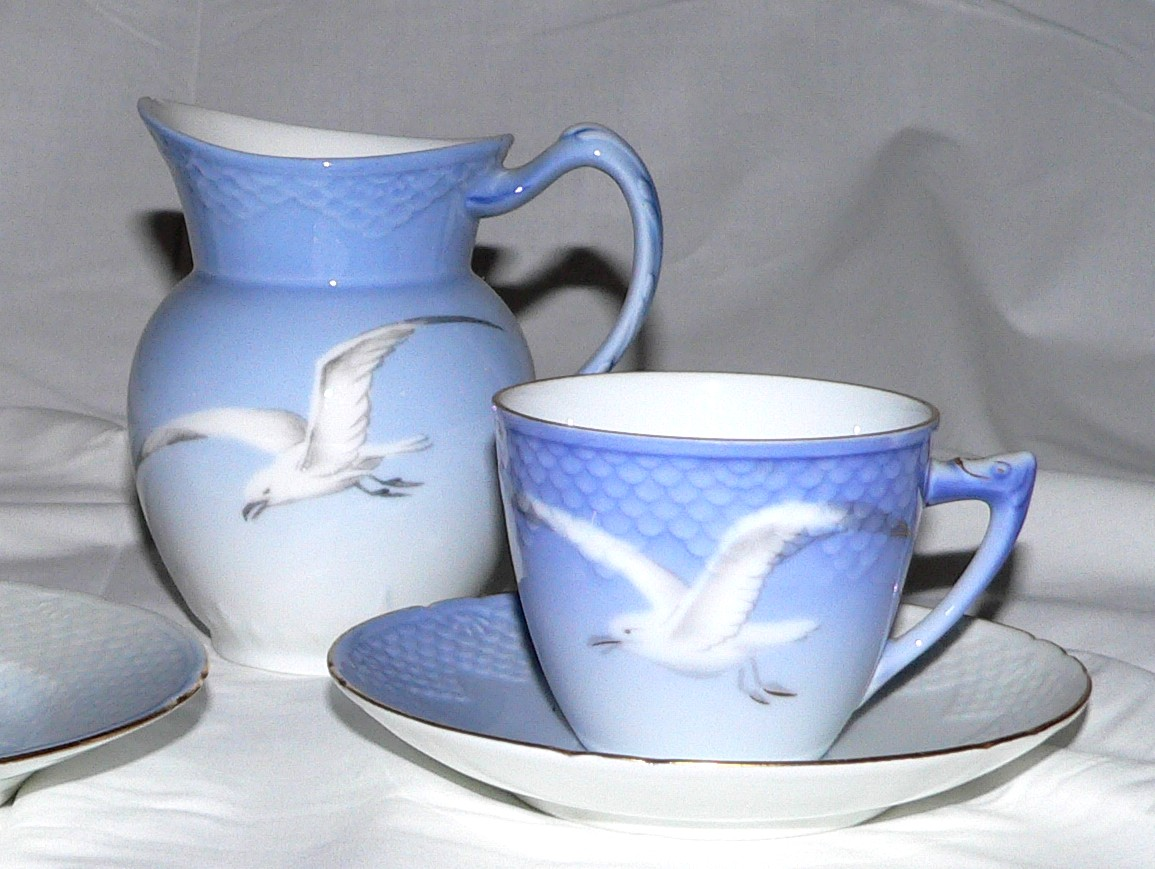
Bing & Grøndahl's Seagull dinnerware, designed by Fanny Garde in 1895

The company's signature design, Seagull, was created in 1892 by designer Fanny Garde (1855-1925). The modest, classic design features flying seagulls against pale blue backgrounds, sea horse handles and shaded patterns of scales around the edges. Due to its popularity from the 1950s to the 1980s, the Seagull design was considered the "National Service of Denmark". During that period one out of every ten Danish households owned some of the dinnerware service.

In 1895, Bing & Grøndahl created the first in their series of Christmas plates. Designed with a traditional winter scene in cobalt blue and white, the plates have been released annually for more than 100 years. Noted as desirable by collectors, this series became responsible for a large portion of the company's production.

In 1987 the company merged with its primary competitor, the Royal Porcelain Factory under the name Royal Copenhagen.

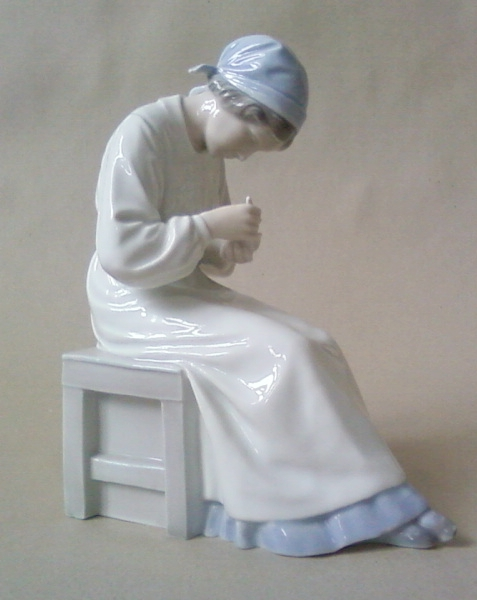
Bing & Grøndahl: Porcelain painter, designed by Jens Peter Dahl-Jensen, 1915

The tea service designed by Gertrud Vasegaard in 1956 was included in the Danish Culture Canon as a masterpiece of Danish design.

== Associated people ==
=== Artistic directors ===
- 1853-1868 Andreas Juuel
- 1868-1890 Heinrich Hansen
- 1885-1892 Pietro Krohn (later board member)
- 1897-1900 J.F. Willumsen

=== Other artists ===
- August Hallin
- Siegfried Wagner, sculptor
- Kai Nielsen, sculptor
- Jean René Gauguin
- Fanny Garde
- Effie Hegermann-Lindencorne
- Hans Tegner
- Carl Petersen
- H.O. Busch-Jensen
