= Solbjerg Park Cemetery =

Cemetery in Copenhagen, Denmark

Coordinates: 55.6739°N 12.5136°E

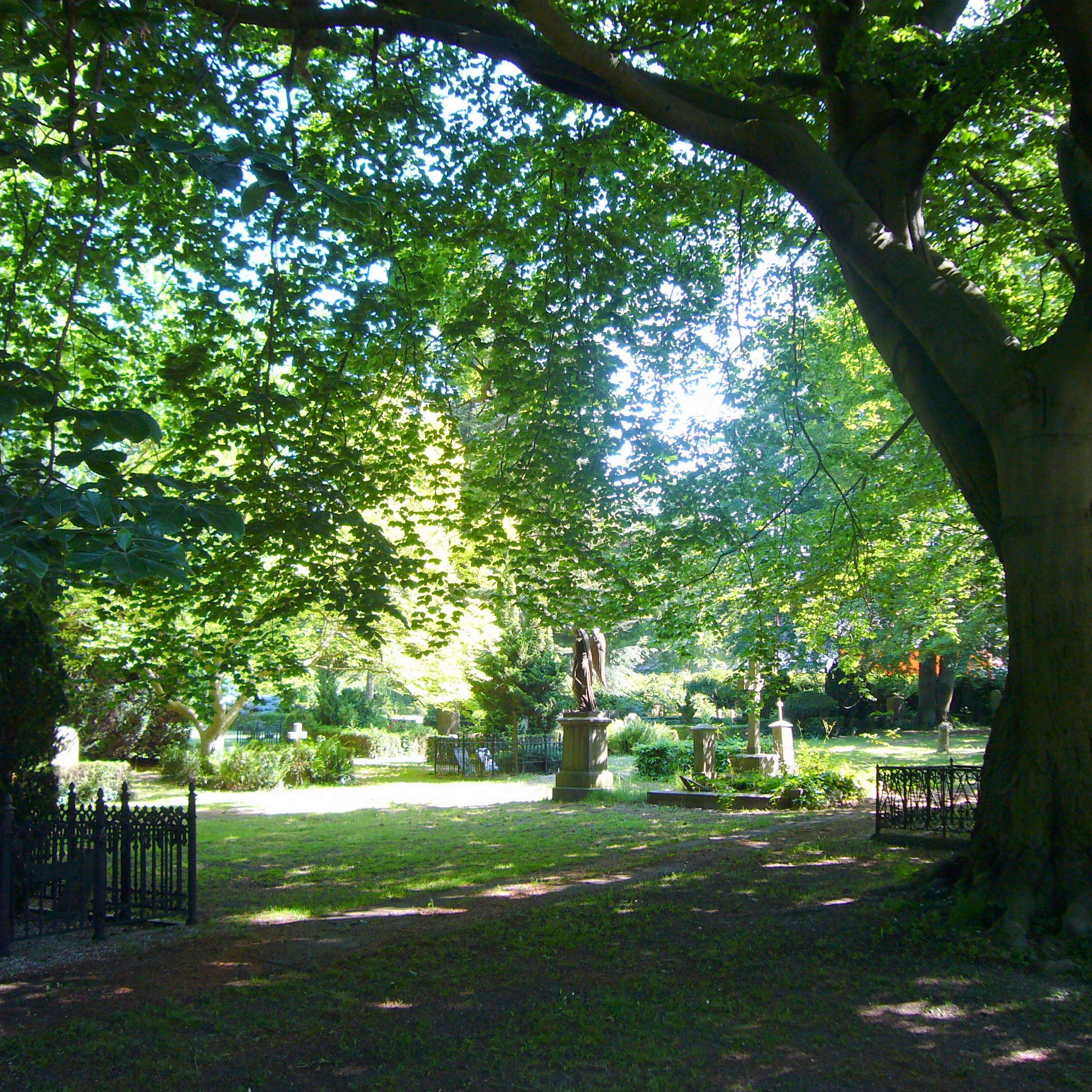
Solbjerg Park Cemetery

Solbjerg Park Cemetery (Danish: Solbjerg Parkkirkegård) Is a 19-hectare cemetery in Frederiksberg in the western outskirts of inner Copenhagen, Denmark. Founded in 1865, it is one of three cemeteries in Frederiksberg Municipality. It will be decommissioned and converted into a park between 2020 and 2050.

== History ==
The cemetery was established in 1863 and was originally called Frederksberg Assistens Cemetery (Frederiksberg Assistens Kirkegård) but also referred to as Fasan Cemetery (Fasankirkegården). It was renamed Solbjerg Cemetery (Solbjerg Kirkegård) in 1926.

In 1980, Frederiksberg Burial Services decided to decommission the areas along the edges of the cemetery by 2020. The decision was approved by Frederiksberg Municipal Council and the Ministry of Church Affairs. In 1994, the authorities decided to decommission the remaining part of the cemetery by 2060.

== Notable people buried in Solbjerg Park Cemetery ==
- Aksel Agerby
- Anders Børge Nørgaard
- Hans Frederik Alsing
- H.C. Andersen
- Rasmus Andersen
- G.J. Arvin
- Frederik Asmussen
- Kirsten Auken
- Carl Balsgaard
- Bernhard Bang
- Oluf Bang
- Wilhelm Otto Bentzon
- Julius Bertram-Larsen
- Rasmus Besthorn
- Niels Bjerrum
- H.A. Brendekilde
- Angelo Bruun (nedlagt)
- Peter Buch
- Johan Frederik Busch
- Harald Böhling-Petersen
- Marinus Børup
- Gustav Castenskiold
- Rasmus Christiansen
- August Crome (nedlagt)
- Hans Dall
- Søffren Degen
- Helen Dohlmann
- Elisabeth Dons
- Ib Eisner
- Else Faber
- Edvard Fallesen
- N.J. Fjord
- Immanuel Franksen
- Peter Petersen Freuchen
- Aage Friis
- J.F.N. Friis-Skotte
- Johannes Fønss
- Jørgen Fønss
- V.E. Gamborg
- Fanny Garde
- Johann Christian Gebauer
- Harald Giersing
- Aage Gotved
- Helle Gotved
- Ludvig Grundtvig
- Holger Grønvold
- Jørgen Gudmundsen-Holmgreen
- Oskar Gyldmark
- Olaf Gynt
- Carl Georg Gædeken
- Henny Harald Hansen
- Osvald Hansen
- Johan Hassel
- Kamma Hedin
- Sophus Heegaard
- Julius Hellmann
- Leopold Helweg
- O.A. Hermansen
- Mikkel Hindhede
- J.C.W. Hirsch
- Just Holm
- Elise Holst
- Wilhelm Holst
- Cathrine Horsbøl
- Frantz Howitz
- Palle Huld
- Hans Erling Hækkerup
- Axel Høeg-Hansen
- Ferdinand Vilhelm Jensen
- Harald Jensen
- Thomas Jensen
- Jens Adolf Jerichau
- Elisabeth Jerichau Baumann
- Fritz Johannsen
- Eigil Johansen
- Edvard Jünger
- Sophus Jürgensen
- H.V. Kaalund
- Christian Kampmann
- Paul Kelvin
- Johan Kjeldahl
- Grete Klitgaard (nedlagt)
- L.J. Koch
- Simon Koch
- Holger Koed
- Carl Andreas Koefoed
- Harald Krabbe
- Ole Bjørn Kraft
- Alfred Krarup
- Johanne Krebs
- G.F. Krog-Clausen
- Henrik Kyhl
- Vilhelm Kyhn
- C.A. Kølle
- Sigurd Langberg
- Christen Larsen
- Dorothy Larsen
- Niels Larsen Stevns
- Inger Lassen (nedlagt)
- Palle Lauring
- Carl Lauritzen
- Henny Lauritzen
- Laurs Laursen
- Carl Lendorf
- Fernando Linderberg
- Stig Lommer
- Harald Lund
- Christian Ludvig Lundbye
- Line Luplau
- Marie Luplau
- Christian Frederik Lütken
- Adolph Lønborg
- Harald Lønborg
- Aage Lønborg-Jensen
- Gunnar Laage
- Carl Maglekilde-Petersen
- Axel Mathiesen (nedlagt)
- Emma Meyer
- Fritz Meyer
- Tao Michaëlis
- L.C. Mollerup
- Emilie Mundt
- Carl Muusmann
- Carl Møller
- Erik Mørk
- Elna Mygdal
- Sophus Nellemann
- Ellen Nielsen
- Mathilde Nielsen
- Martin Nørresø
- Camillus Nyrop
- Eiler Nystrøm
- Benjamin Olsen
- Ludvig Oppermann
- Theodor Oppermann
- Henry Petersen
- Antonette Prip-Møller
- Johannes Prip-Møller
- Barclay Raunkiær
- Christen Raunkiær
- Ingeborg Raunkiær
- Holga Reinhard
- Axel Reventlow
- C.F. Rich
- A.H. Riise
- Frederik Riise
- Christian Rimestad (nedlagt)
- Wilhelm Rothe
- Frederik Rung
- Guri Schade
- Harald Schiødte
- Valdemar Schiøler Linck (nedlagt)
- Julius Schiøtt
- Ida Schiøttz-Jensen
- Hans Schjellerup
- Albrecht Schmidt
- Valdemar Schmidt
- P.A. Schou
- Axel Schovelin
- Julius Schovelin
- Karel Šedivý
- Ingeborg Seidelin
- Carl Simonsen
- Niels Juel Simonsen
- Vagn Skovgaard-Petersen
- Roar Skovmand
- Herman Slomann
- Frederik Læssøe Smidth
- Hans Ludvig Smidth
- Tove Steines
- Peter Matthias Stolpe
- Oscar Stribolt
- Valdemar Stribolt
- Vera Stricker
- Olga Svendsen (nedlagt)
- Wilhelm Sørensen
- Isac Wilhelm Tegner
- Charles Tharnæs
- Thorvaldur Thoroddsen
- Elisabeth Tornøe
- Holger Tornøe
- Wenzel Ulrik Tornøe
- Christian Frederik Frands Elias Tuxen
- Harriet Vendelhaven
- Frederik Wagner (officer)
- Frederik Wagner (architect)
- Gerda Wegener
- Bertha Wegmann
- Gustav Westring
- Carl Wivel
- Pauline Worm
