= Louise Ravn-Hansen =

Danish landscape painter and etcher

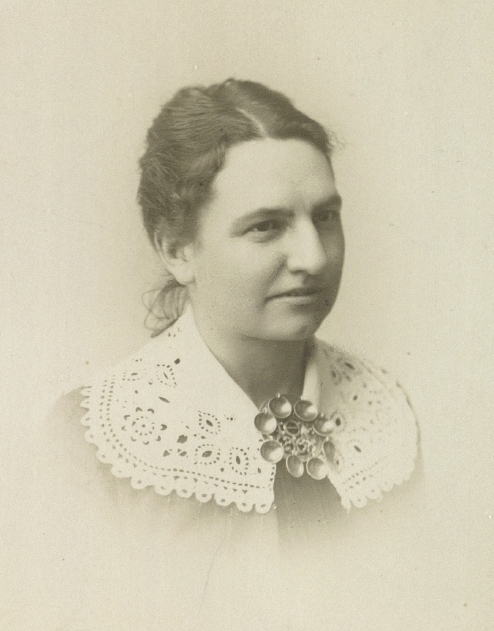
Louise Ravn-Hansen; photograph by Mary Steen

Louise Christiane Ravn-Hansen (19 July 1849 in Copenhagen – January 1909 in the Havel River, near Schwanenwerder) was a Danish landscape painter and etcher.

== Biography ==
Her father was a railroad stoker. She lost both parents when she was eight and was adopted by her uncle, Niels Frederik Hansen, a cloth merchant. She received her first art instruction from the flower painter, Emma Mulvad (1838-1903). From 1872 to 1876, she studied at the "Painting School for Women", operated by Vilhelm Kyhn. In the summer, she made drawings of the statues and reliefs at the Royal Cast Collection and, for a time, took private lessons from Jørgen Roed.

During this time, she also began painting en plein aire. In 1877, she had her first showing of landscapes at the Charlottenborg Spring Exhibition and became a regular participant for the rest of her life. She also had showings at the Nordic Exhibition of 1888 and the Glaspalast (Munich) in 1899, among others.

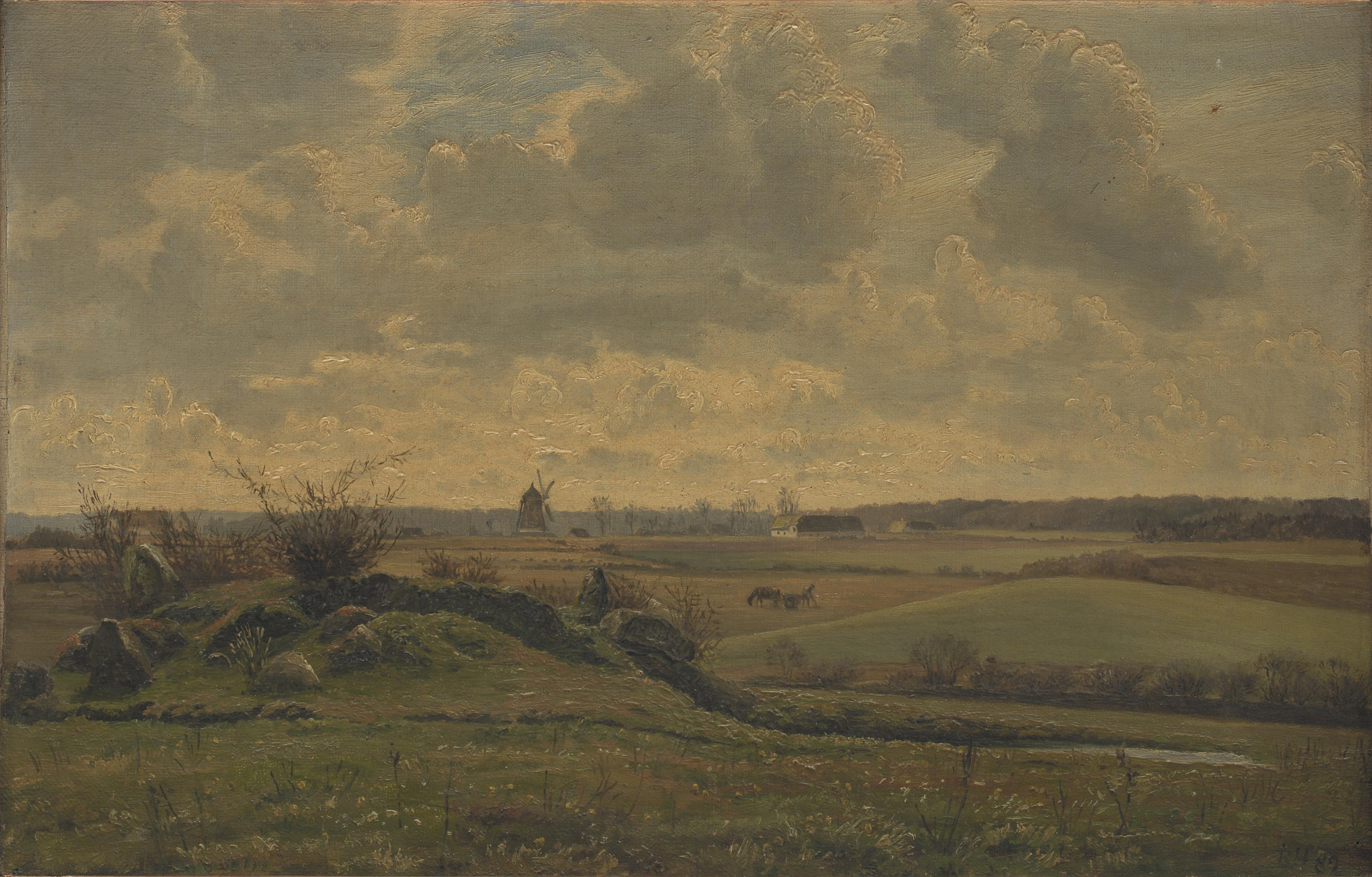
Landscape near Gyrstinge, Zealand

In 1888, along with 22 other female artists, including Marie Luplau, Emilie Mundt and Anne Marie Carl-Nielsen, she signed a petition to the Rigsdagen demanding that women be admitted to the Royal Danish Academy of Fine Arts. That same year saw the establishment of the Royal Academy Art School for Women. Although she helped recruit Viggo Johansen as a teacher there, she was generally not involved in the school.

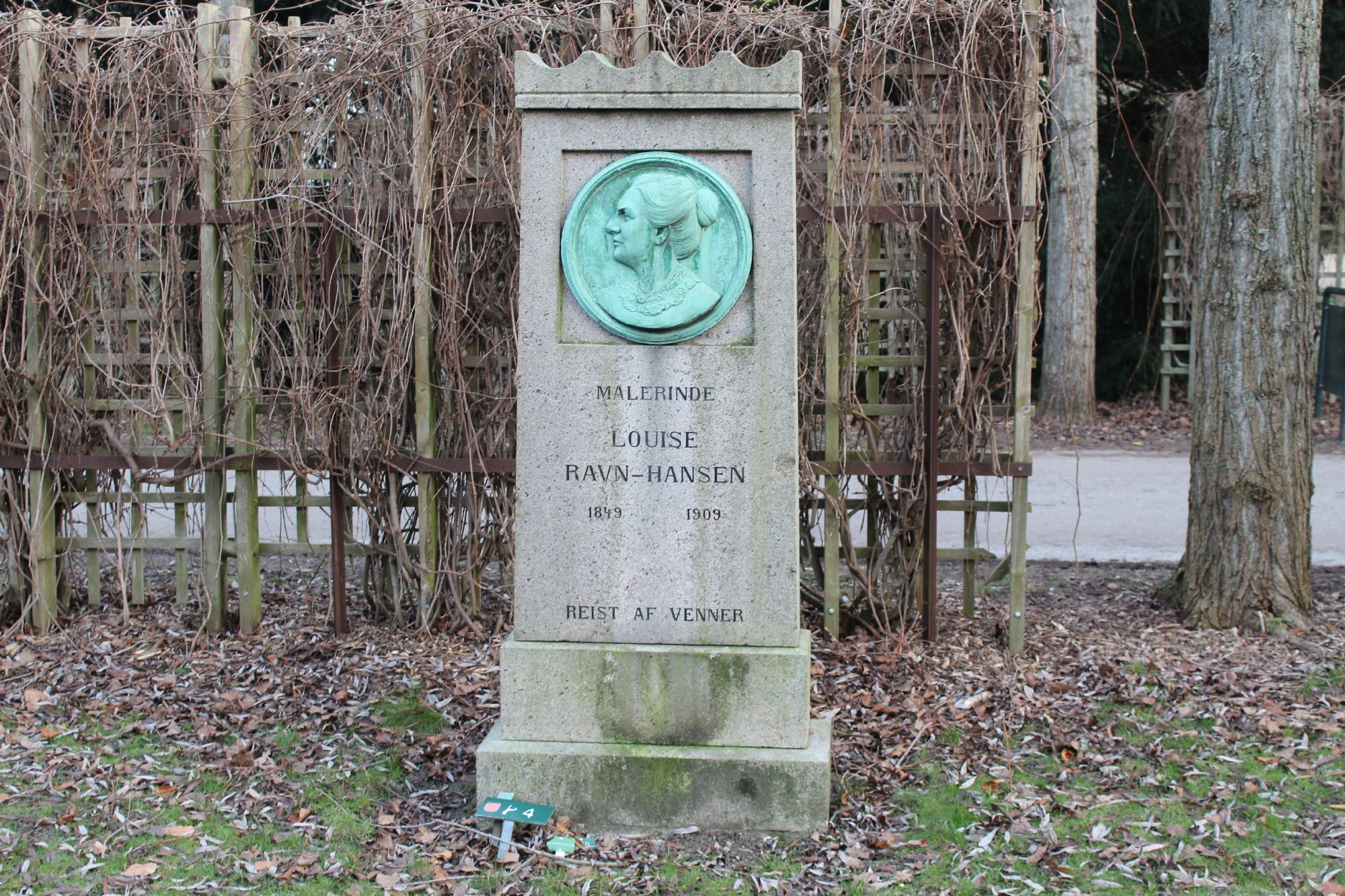
Louise Ravn-Gansen's tomb at Assistens Cemetery in Copenhagen.

In 1890, she received a grant from the Raben-Levetzauske Fund, a scientific, educational and cultural fund established by Carl Vilhelm Raben-Levetzau, a major landowner. This enabled her to study in Italy and Germany. She made several trips to Berlin, where she could have her etchings produced at a much higher quality.

She drowned in the Havel River on her way to Berlin; apparently the result of an accident, but the circumstances are unclear. After her death, a life grant in her name was established at the Academy. In 1916, the grant went to Emma Meyer, Ravn-Hansen's close friend and travelling companion.
