= Mundt =

Mundt is a surname. Notable people with the surname include:

- Andreas Mundt (born 1960), President of the Bundeskartellamt
- Carl Emil Mundt (1802–1873), Danish educator and politician
- Clara Mundt (1814–1873), German writer known by her pen name Luise Mühlbach
- Emilie Mundt (1842–1922), Danish painter
- Ethan Mundt (born 1995), American drag queen
- Inge Mundt, German rower
- Jeanette Mundt (born 1980), American painter
- Johnny Mundt (born 1994), American football player
- Karl Earl Mundt (1900–1974), American educator and politician
- Kate Mundt (1930–2004), Danish film actress
- Kristina Mundt (born 1966), German rower
- Lori Ann Mundt (born 1971) Canadian volleyball player
- Miel Mundt (1880–1949), Dutch football player
- Theodor Mundt (1808–1861), German critic and novelist
- Todd Mundt (born 1970), American Basketball player

== Fictional characters ==
- Hans-Dieter Mundt, fictional character in Call for the Dead and The Spy Who Came In From The Cold
- Karl "Madman" Mundt, fictional character in Joel and Ethan Coen's Barton Fink
