= Emma Meyer =

Danish painter (1859–1921)

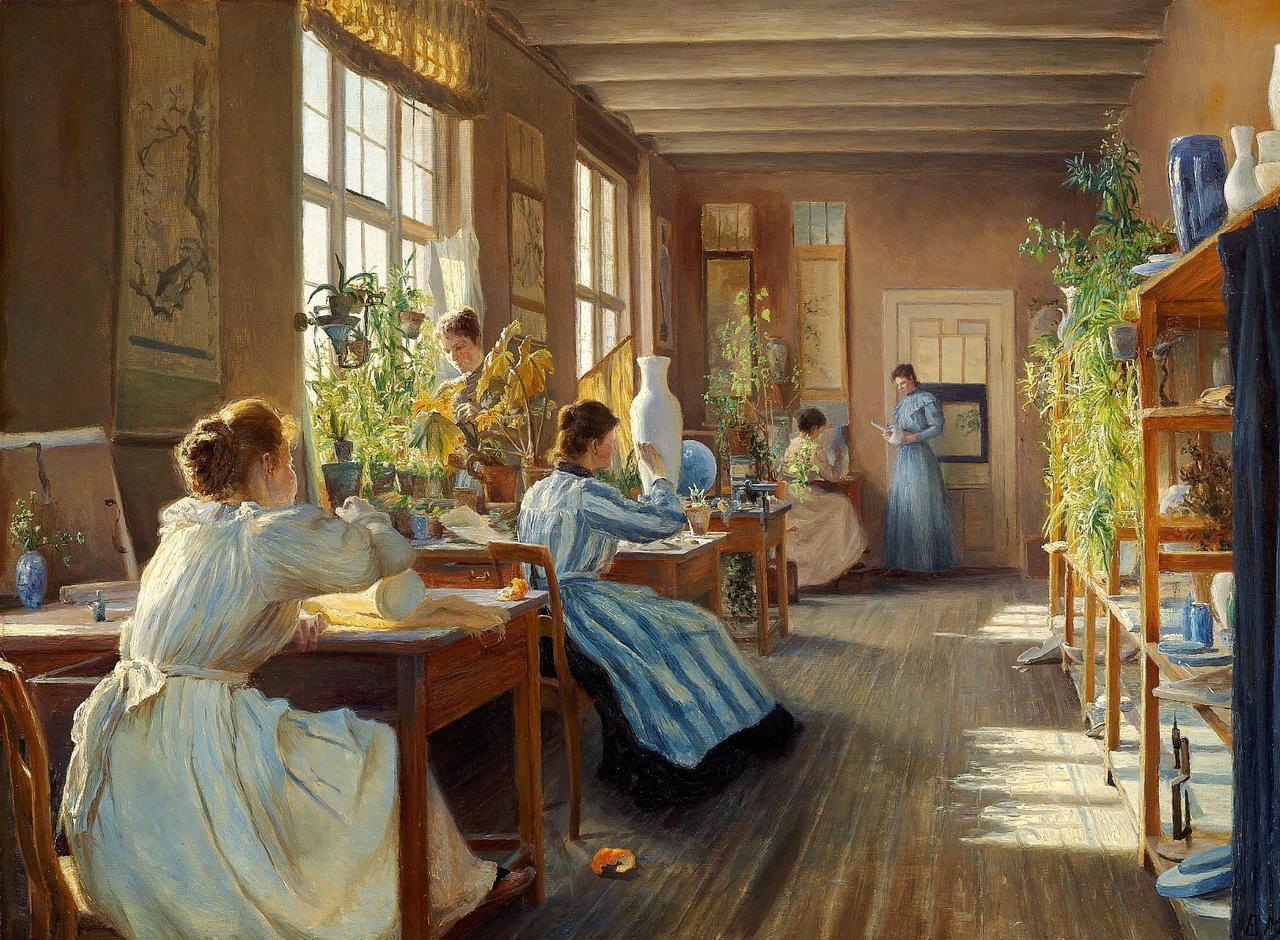
Women doing decorative work at the Royal Porcelain Factory, 1895

Emma Eleonore Meyer (20 August 1859, Flensburg — 8 October 1921, Frederiksberg) was a Danish painter best known for her depictions of Jutlandic landscapes. She also produced portraits and flower paintings.

Her sister, Jenny Sophie Meyer, was also a renowned artists, who worked as a porcelain painter at the Royal Porcelain Factory. She likely inspired one of Meyer's most recognizable paintings, which depicted women working at the factory.

== Biography ==
Emma Eleonore Meyer was born 20 August 1859 in Flensburg, then within the Duchy of Schleswig. Her father, Fritz Meyer, was a lawyer. Her mother was named Marie Frederikke Dalberg. She began studying art at the drawing and painting school for women, operated by Emilie Mundt and Marie Luplau. Later, she became a student of Harald Foss and Peder Severin Krøyer. Much like Foss and his teacher Vilhelm Kyhn, Meyer gravitated towards landscape painting and drew mostly on motifs from the area around Silkeborg.

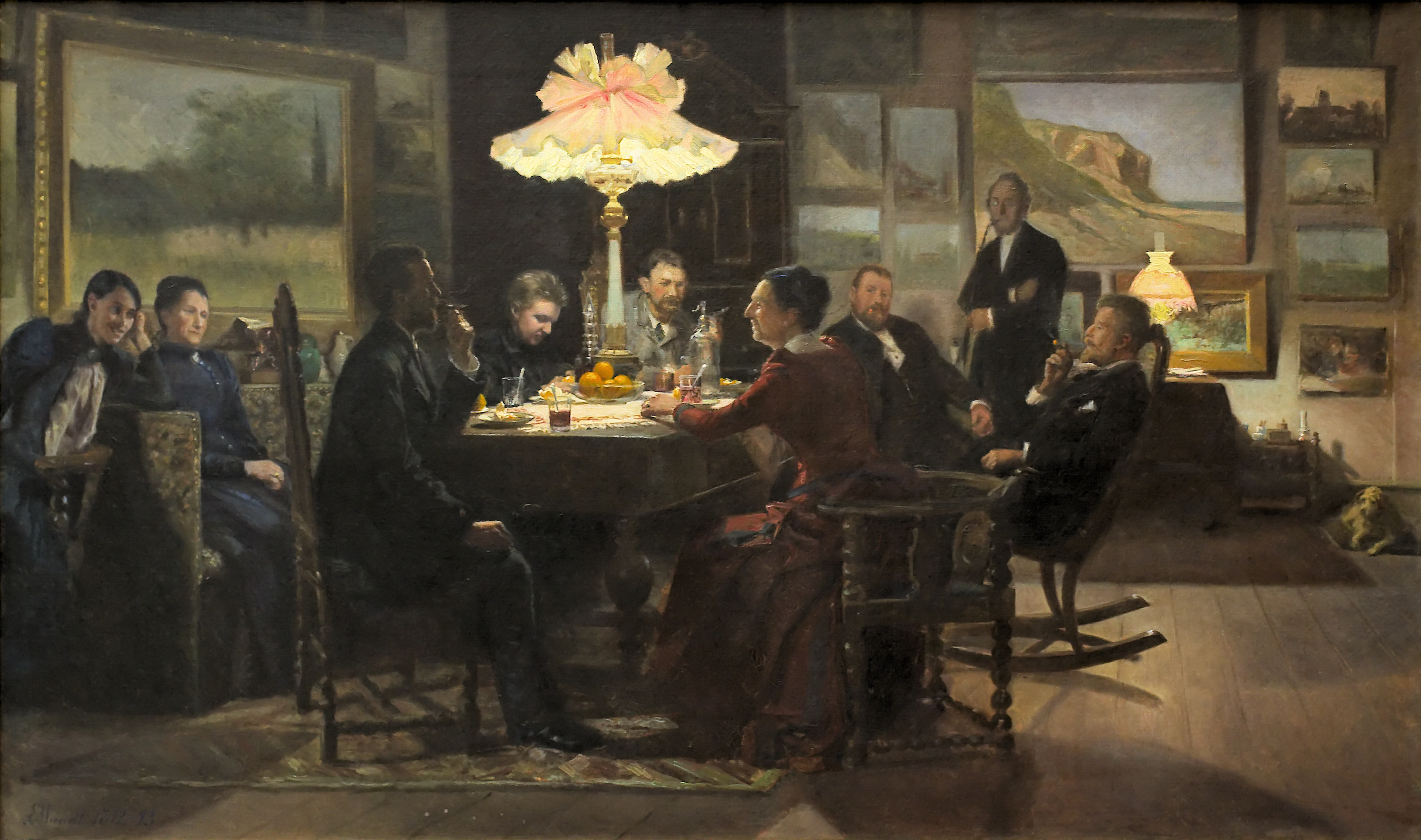
Emilie Mundt's painting Efter hjemkomsten. Meyer is believed to be the woman depicted on the far left.

Beginning in 1885, she held numerous showings at the Kunsthal Charlottenborg. Her painting of women working at the Royal Porcelain Factory was displayed there in 1895, and purchased by the art association. That same year, she participated in the Women's Exhibition in Copenhagen. Shortly after, she was awarded a scholarship from the Royal Danish Academy of Fine Arts. She made several short trips abroad and, in 1901, received an incentive award from the Frederik Sødring Endowment. In 1916, she was given a lifetime grant from the Louise Ravn-hansen Fund.

Meyer died on 8 October 1921 in Frederiksberg and was buried at Solbjerg Park Cemetery. Like many female artists of her era, Meyer never married.

== Gallery ==
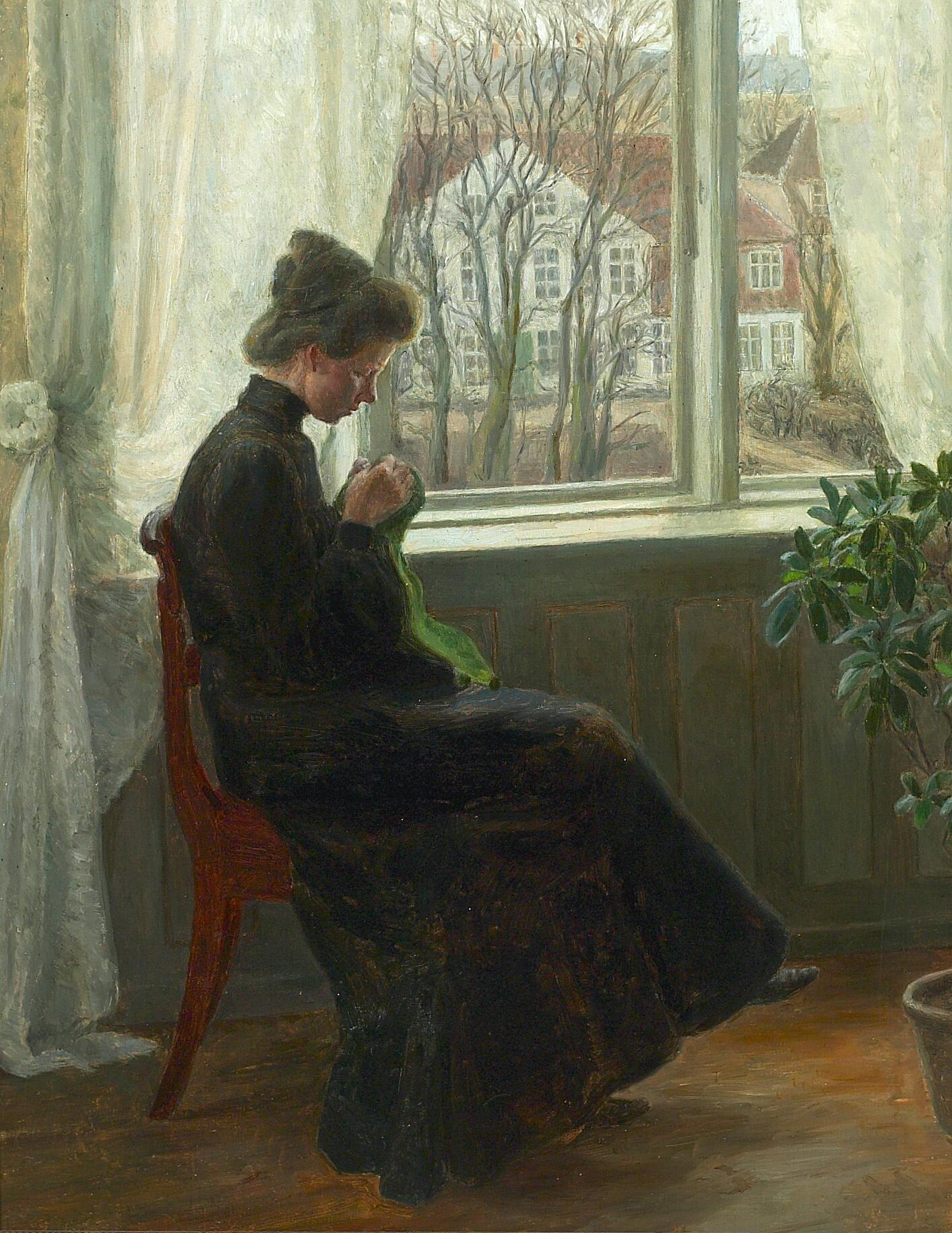
Syende kvinde ved et vindue med udsigt over Pile Allé, oil on canvas

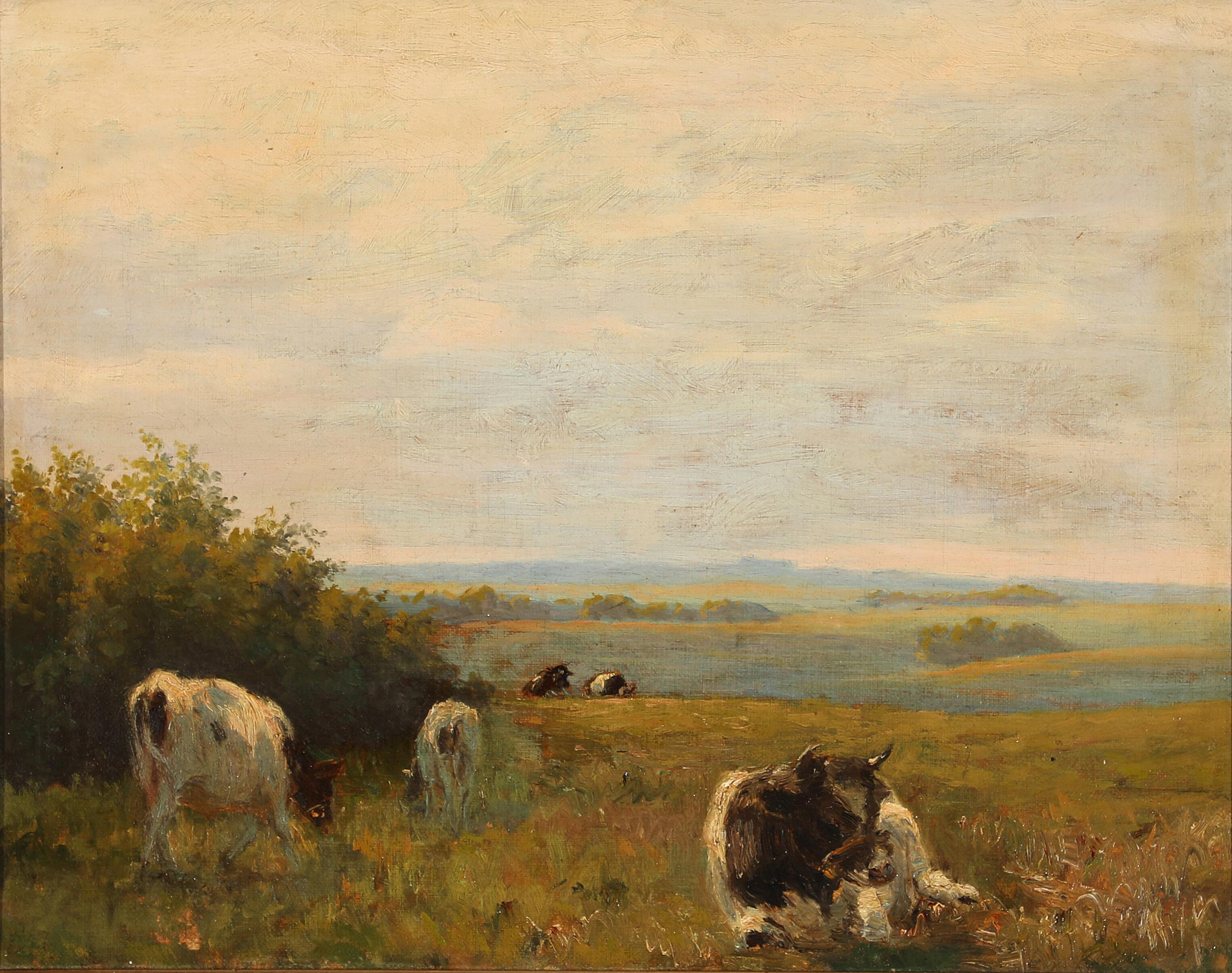
Aftenlandskab med køer på marken, oil on canvas

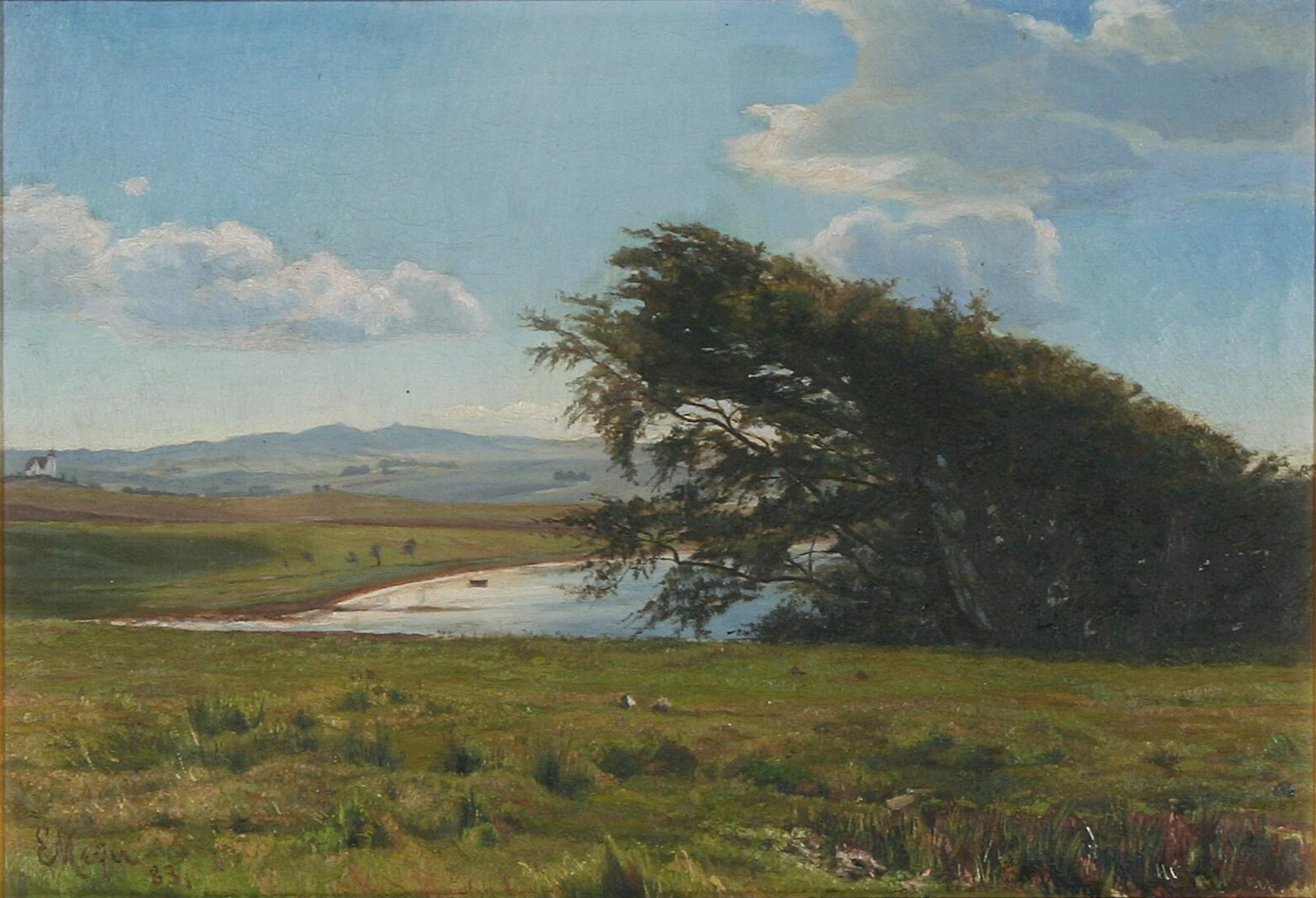
Trehøje ved Mols Bjerge, 1883, oil on canvas

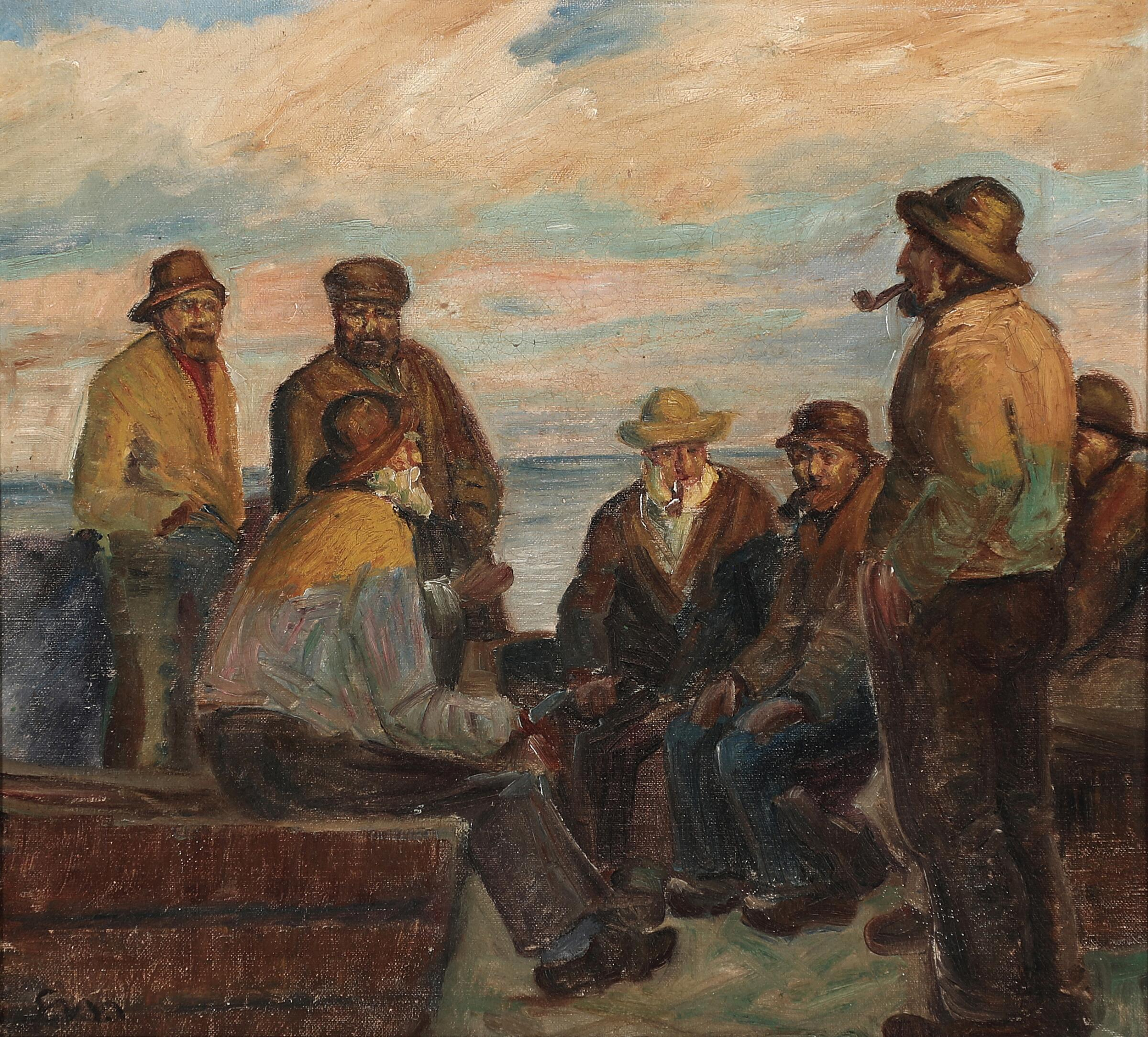
Fiskere i aftensol, 1888, oil on canvas

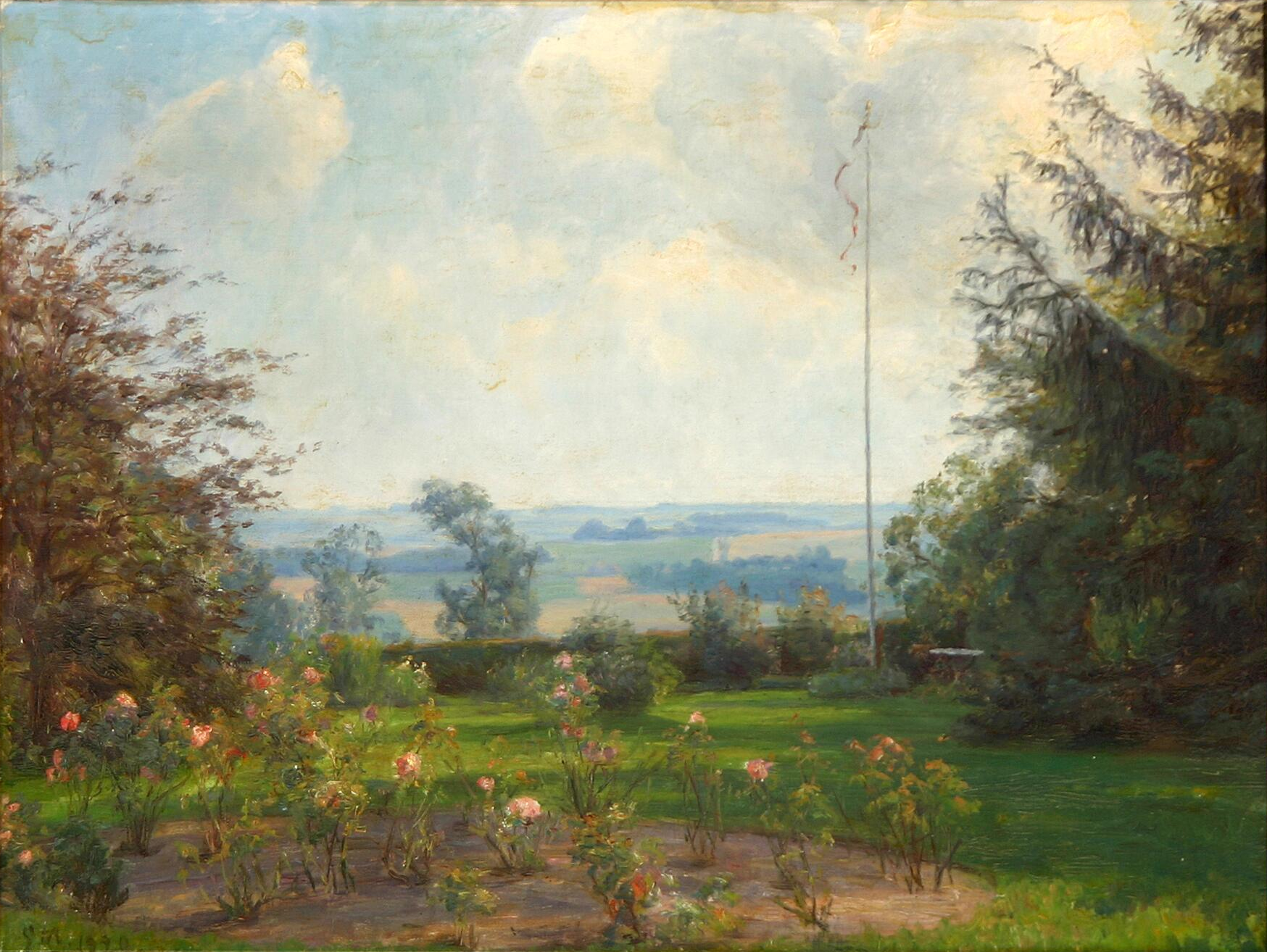
Udsigt fra Frk. Foghs Have i Skjold, 1920, oil on canvas
