= Ellen Andersen =

Danish museum curator (1898–1989)

Ellen Dorothea Johanna Andersen (7 July 1898 – 22 January 1989) was a Danish museum curator who specialized in folk costumes and the history of textiles. In 1929, she joined the Danish Folk Museum where she was the curator from 1936 to 1966. She is remembered for her many books on costumes, including Danske bønders klædedragt (1960).

== Biography ==
Born on 7 July 1898 in Serridslevgård Manor near Horsens, Ellen Dorothea Johanna Andersen was the daughter of the estate owner Peter Jordt Brodersen (1865–1936) and Johanna Helene Louise née Voswinckel (1866–1945). Her early education was provided by tutors while her German-born mother, who had lived in England, ensured her fluency in German and English. She completed her schooling at the high school in Horsens, matriculating in 1916. The family moved to Copenhagen in 1919.

In 1929, Andersen joined the Danish Folk Museum where she became the assistant of the textile expert and curator Elna Mygdal. She accompanied Mygdal on her trips researching costumes and textiles, registering new items in the collection. After Mygdal retired, in 1936 Andersen was appointed curator. She oversaw the collection's transfer to the newly constructed National Museum where she undertook work on exhibiting items on embroidery, knitwear, weaving and costumes. Over the years, she arranged many exhibitions, one with models dressed in folk costumes.

Continuing Mygdal's work, Andersen wrote numerous articles on folk costumes from different regions, finally combining her findings in Danske bønders klædedragt, published in 1960. Earlier works included Folkelig Vævning in Danmark on weaving, together with Elisabeth Budde-Lund (1941). She also put together envelopes containing information and samples of regional costumes which were made available to dancing clubs wishing to prepare local costumes. In the 1940s, Andersen was also co-editor of Berlingske Haandarbejds-Bog (1944), a handicraft lexicon.

In 1954, Andersen was the driving force behind the establishment of the embroidery association Danmarks Folkelige Broderier which was concerned with identifying items created in homes throughout Denmark. Andersen arranged exhibitions and photographic presentations, drawing on over 100,000 items which had been identified. After retiring in 1966, she published Bordskik on tableware in 1971 and Bydragt - bondedragt on city attire in 1976. She went on to publish Moden in 1700-årene (1977), Kostumer og modedragter fra Det kgl. Teaters herregarderobe (1979) and Moden 1790–1840 (1986).

Ellen Andersen died on 22 January 1989 in Jystrup.
