= Olivia Holm-Møller =

Danish painter and sculptor

Olivia Holm-Møller (1875–1970) was a Danish painter and sculptor. Her richly coloured, almost abstract paintings provide a bridge between the early Danish Modernism of the 1910s and the Cobra works of the 1950s.

== Biography ==
Born in Homå near Grenå in the east of Jutland, Holm-Møller was the daughter of the teacher Carl Vilhelm August Møller and Ane Kirstine Barbara Holm. After attending Grundvegian free schools, she was introduced to drawing and painting at Emilie Mundt and Marie Luplau's art school in Copenhagen. In 1901, she entered the Royal Danish Academy of Fine Arts where she studied under August Saabye, Viggo Johansen and Sigurd Wandel. For most of her life, she divided her time between Copenhagen, where she spent her winters, at her native Homå, where she lived with her two little nephews, Knud and Karl, who can often be seen in her paintings. It was also in Homå that she painted her ten gigantic canvasses depicting the forces behind human life, especially those influencing women. Also of note are her abstract and figurative works, including her Musikalsk Komposition (Musical Composition, 1940) consisting of four figurative paintings and a large abstract central image.

== Artistic development ==
Her early works were inspired by her trips to London and to Italy, where she studied Etruscan and Greek reliefs. In addition to her own reliefs, she created etchings and woodcuts in a primitive, expressive style. She became increasingly attracted to painting, her breakthrough coming in 1914 with Niobe, depicting her reactions to the outbreak of the First World War in bright, bold colours. Throughout her life her paintings were inspired by Biblical and mythical stories, tempered by her Symbolist roots from artists such as J.F. Willumsen and, in particular, Ejnar Nielsen whom she depicted in several of her works.

After the Second World War, Holm-Møller travelled widely with her colleague Jens Nielsen (1891-1978) visiting primitive communities. In 1950, a visit to Mexico revealed the similarities her works bore with those of José Clemente Orozco's expressive creations. When travelling, Holm-Møller sketched and etched, leaving her large-format paintings until she returned to Denmark. She worked consistently, painting until shortly before her death in Rungsted at the age of 95 on 3 November 1970.

Many of the works of Olivia Holm-Møller and her companion Jens Nielsen can be seen in Holstebro Art Museum. In addition to her painting and sculpture work, she was also a printmaker, a woodcutter and an illustrator.

Holm-Møller exhibited mainly at Den Frie Udstilling where she participated in 20 exhibitions from 1916 to 1968. In 1935, she also exhibited at the 1935 Brussels World Exposition.
