= Astrid Holm (painter) =

Danish painter and textile artist

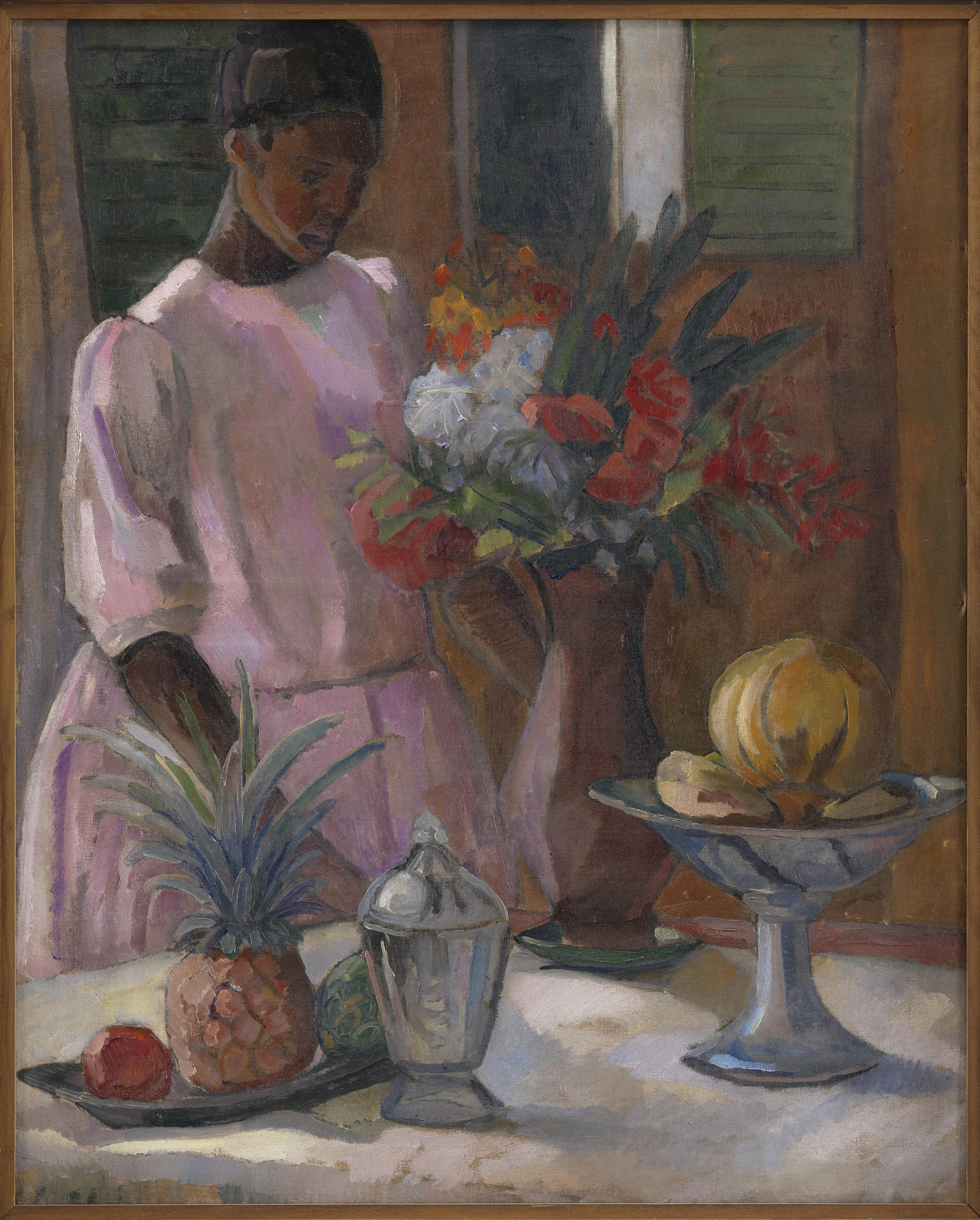
Astrid Holm, Rose dækker bord, 1914, Statens Museum for Kunst

Astrid Valborg Holm (1876–1937) was a Danish painter and textile artist. She was one of only two Danes who studied under Henri Matisse in Paris.

== Biography ==
Born on 30 October 1876 in Copenhagen, Holm was the daughter of the judicial counsellor Henrik Christian Frederik Holm and his wife Severine Jesseline Jessen. After attending Emilie Mundt and Marie Luplau's art school, she entered the Women's Art School in 1904 which would merge with the Royal Danish Academy of Fine Arts in 1908, from which she graduated in 1910. The same year, she became a student of Henri Matisse in Paris. Apart from Carl Forup, she was the only Dane to have been instructed by Matisse who significantly influenced the trend towards Modernism in Scandinavia. She remained in Paris until 1914, becoming a member of the Scandinavian artist colony together with Jais Nielsen and the sculptor Johannes Bjerg.

In 1920, she returned to Paris to study tapestry art at the Manufacture des Gobelins.

It was at Den Frie Udstilling that Holm first exhibited in 1913, causing quite a stir with her Modernist style but she was generally praised for her strong use of colour. She had a firm, simple style, often employing the heavy outlines which are typical of Fauvism. Her subjects included landscapes, interiors, still lifes and flower paintings.

In 1919, she founded Kunstnernes Croquisskole (the Artists Sketching School) which she headed until her death in 1937. It attracted many of the Scandinavian Modernists who visited Copenhagen. After she had learnt the art of tapestry in 1920, she established a textile design school in the Royal Academy. She turned increasingly to weaving, often in collaboration with Ebba Carstensen, creating rugs with geometric or figurative designs. In 1926, she assisted in arranging the Nordic Women Artists Exhibition (Nordiske Kvindelige Kunstneres Udstilling), working in support of better educational opportunities for female artists.

Astrid Holm died on 17 December 1937 in the Frederiksberg district of Copenhagen. She never married and had no children.

== Exhibition ==
- Rønnebæksholm: Astrid Holm & Co.
