= Dohlmann =

Dohlmann is a surname. Notable people with the surname include:

- Augusta Dohlmann (1847–1914), Danish painter
- Helen Dohlmann (1870–1942), Danish sculptor

== See also ==
- Dohmann
