= Carl Mundt =

Carl Mundt may refer to:

- Carl Emil Mundt (1802–1873), Danish educator and politician
- Karl Mundt (1900–1974), American politician

== See also ==
- Carl Munters (1897–1989), Swedish inventor
