= Aage Friis =

Danish historian (1870–1949)

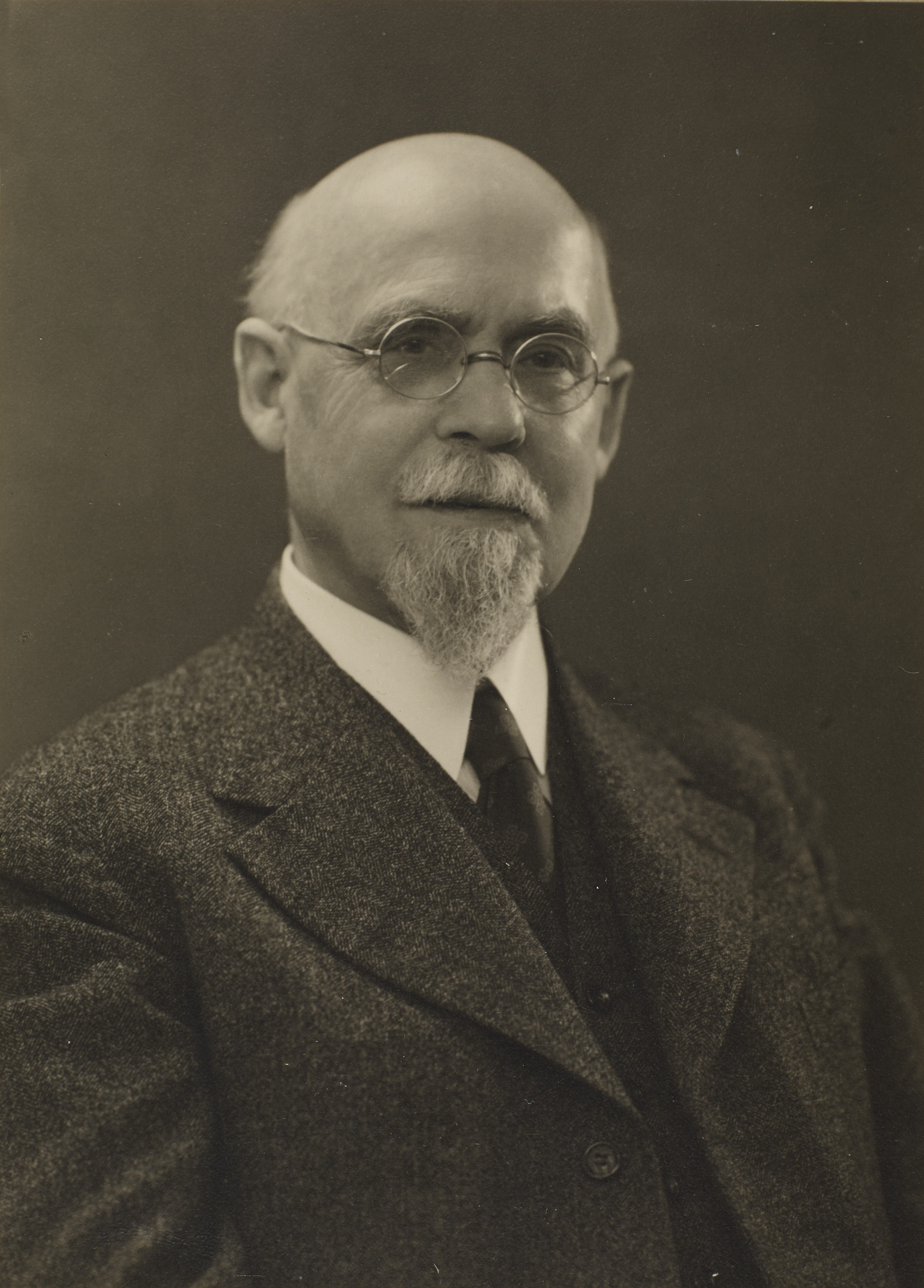
Aage Friis

Aage Friis (16 August 1870 – 5 October 1949) was a Danish historian and professor at the University of Copenhagen.

== Biography ==
Aage Friis was born in Korsør in Slagelse, Denmark. He was the son of Johan Frederik Friis (1833-1910) and Juliane Marie Landkilde (1832-1911). His father was a parish priest who also taught his children together with other children from the village.

In 1884, he was enrolled in Viborg Katedralskole. At Copenhagen, Friis completed his studies in 1896 with a master's degree in history. He was a member of the university library at the University of Copenhagen from 1891 to 1900, during which he graduated with a doctorate in 1899 with a dissertation on Andreas Peter Bernstorff and Ove Høegh-Guldberg.

In 1913, he became the history professor at the University of Copenhagen, where he remained until his retirement in 1935. He was rector of the university in 1932-1933. In 1919 he was one of the co-founders of the Norden Associations (Foreningen Norden) which works to promote common Nordic culture, society and economic ties.

Friis was concerned with Danish history primarily in its relations with Germany. The German-Danish noble family Bernstorff presented one of its main themes in the history of the early modern period; his two-volume work Die Bernstorffs und Dänemark were written in Danish and also translated into German. He appeared as a Danish biographer of the career of German chancellor Otto von Bismarck prior to his political rise. He also maintained a professional working relationship with German professor and historian Friedrich Meinecke (1862–1954).

Before and after the First World War, he became a member of the Danish Social Liberal Party. He served partly as an employee of the Danish Ministry of Foreign Affairs on the Southern Jutland issue, which resulted in Nordschleswig becoming Danish again after the war as a result of the Schleswig plebiscites of 1920.

Aage Friis was a member of the Royal Danish Academy of Sciences and Letters from 1920. He died at Hellerup and was buried at Solbjerg Park Cemetery in Frederiksberg.

== Selected works ==
- Bismarck. Ungdomstiden 1815 - 1848. En Historisk Skildring (Copenhagen: Gyldendal, 1909)
- Blixen Finecke og Bismarck: en brevveksling (Copenhagen: Graebes Bogtrykkeri, 1916. printed in Danske Magazin 1916, p. 365-387)
- Die Bernstorffs und Dänemark: ein Beitrag zur politischen und kulturellen Entwicklungsgeschichte des dänischen Staates; 1750-1835, 2 Volumes, (Leipzig: Weicher-Verlag, 1905)
