= Helle Gotved =

Danish gymnastics instructor and writer

Helle Tyrsted Gotved née Rasmussen (1912–2006) was a Danish gymnastics instructor and writer. From 1932, together with her husband Aage Gotved, she began to develop a new approach to gymnastics known as Gotved Gymanstics based on a combination of breathing, voice and physical exercise involving the natural movements of the body. From the mid-1950s, backed by her publications and radio programmes, her approach became popular throughout Denmark. Instructors in Godved Gymnastics are still educated at the Gotved Institute which is named after her.

== Biography ==
Born on 25 October 1912, Gotved was the daughter of the gymnastics director Niels Hansen Rasmussen (1854–1924) and his wife Mette Marie Agnete Elisabeth Otterstrøm (1873–1969). She was born and raised in the Gymnastics House (Gymnastikhuset) on Vodroffsvej in Frederiksberg which her father had built in 1898 in order to teach the approach to gymnastics developed by the Swede Pehr Henrik Ling in the early 19th century. When her father died in 1924, her mother continued to run the facility.

After following the traditional young woman's training at a housekeeping school, in 1929 she entered Tønder Seminarium, a teachers training college. She did not complete the course, preferring instead to spend a year at the National Gymnastics Institute (Statens Gymnastikinstitut). As soon as she had taken her final examinations in 1932, she married Aage Gotved who had been employed as an instructor at the Gymnastics House since she was 10 years old. The same year, she and her husband took over the management of the Gymnastics House.

Despite having to raise five children, Gotved continued to follow the latest developments in gymnastics training, including the use of music introduced by the German Heinrich Medau (1890–1974) whose school she attended in 1952. On returning to Denmark, she embarked on a completely new approach to physical education in which music played an essential part. It was this system for which she became known throughout the country.

From the age of 40, she was also active in writing books and articles about her approach. In 1954, she co-founded the association Helse og Arbeit (Health and Work), taking account of the findings of the Norwegian neurologist H. Seyffarth who had emphasized the need for natural movements in gymnastics. This all led to what became known as Gotved Gymnastics which was not designed to produce top-ranking gymnasts but rather to encourage ordinary people to improve their well-being. Exercises were designed to relieve everything from back pains to bunions and sexual inhibitions. Her rhythmic gymnastics were based on methods associated with the anatomy, physiology and natural movements of the whole body. In addition to her publications, she also hosted Ha’ det bedre (Feel Better) a weekly radio programme which ran every Saturday morning for 26 years. She also ran a two-year educational programme as well as shorter courses which attracted schoolteachers, physiotherapists and relaxation therapists.

Gotved continued to run the Gymnastics House until 1984 when she transferred its management to Lizzi Jørgensen and Inge Gotved, her daughter in law. She went on to publish two volumes of memoires, Bsrn i Gymnastikhuset (A Child in the Gymnastics House, 1992) and Mit livs gymnastikhistorie (My Life in Gymnastics, 1995).

Helle Gotved died on 19 June 2006 and is buried in Solbjerg Park Cemetery.

== Awards ==
In 1982, Gotved was awarded the PH Prize and the Gerlev Prize. She was honoured as a Knight of the Dannebrog in 1987.
