= Jenny Sophie Meyer =

Danish painter (1866–1927)

Jenny Sophie Meyer (16 April 1866, Frederiksberg – 23 April 1927), known as Jenny Meyer, was a Danish porcelain painter and the sister of painter and graphic artist Emma Meyer.

== Life and work ==
Jenny Meyer was the daughter of Supreme Court judge Fritz Meyer and Marie Frederikke Dalberg. In 1892, she was employed by the Royal Porcelain Factory under Arnold Krog and trained as an underglaze painter for unique pieces, which she primarily decorated with floral motifs. She remained employed at the porcelain factory until her death in 1927. Some vases she exhibited at the World’s Fair in Chicago in 1893 were awarded a medal. In 1895, she visited London, particularly to study the ceramics department at the South Kensington Museum. For the Women’s Exhibition in Copenhagen in 1895, Meyer—competing with several other women—created a plate featuring a dandelion motif for the Royal Porcelain Factory.

Meyer also exhibited through her employer at the Danish Exhibition at the Royal Museum of Decorative Arts in Berlin (1910), the Retrospective Exhibition of Women Artists in Copenhagen (1920), and at the International Exhibition of Modern Decorative and Industrial Arts in Paris (1925).

She remained unmarried and was buried in Bispebjerg.

== Literature ==
- Jenny Meyer. In: Kunstindeks Danmark & Weilbachs kunstnerleksikon
