= Dohmann =

Dohmann is a surname. Notable people with the surname include:

- Carl Dohmann (born 1990), German racewalker
- Scott Dohmann (born 1978), American baseball player

== See also ==
- Dohlmann
