= Elna Mygdal =

Danish textile artist, museum curator and writer (1868–1940)

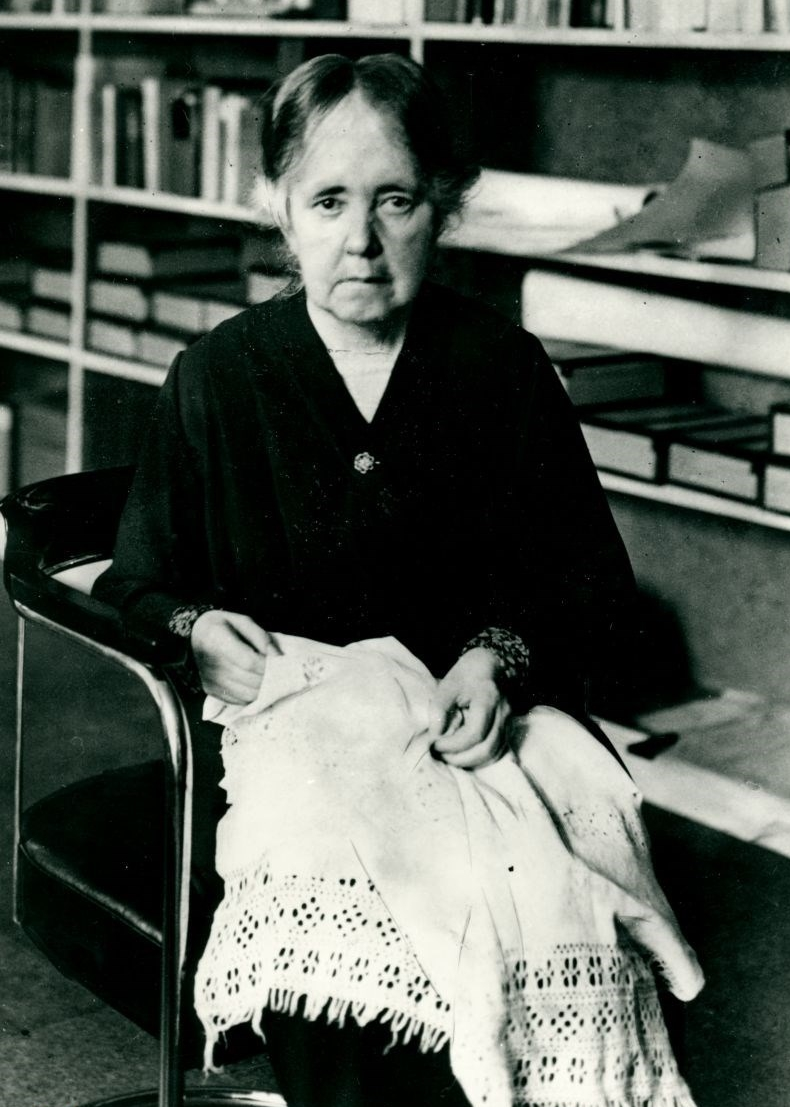
- Mygdal, c. 1930
- Born: 2 June 1868; Nørre-Snede Municipality, Denmark
- Died: February 1, 1940 (aged 71); Frederiksberg, Denmark
- Burial place: Solbjerg Park Cemetery, Frederiksberg, Denmark
- Occupation(s): textile artist, museum curator, writer

Elna Mygdal (2 June 1868 – 1 February 1940) was a Danish textile artist, museum curator and writer. She is remembered in particular for her interest in Hedebo embroidery and for her collection of folk costumes and folk textiles. In 1930, she published the authoritative two-volume Amagerdragter: Vævninger og Syninger on the history of costumes and textiles from Amager, an island adjacent to Copenhagen.

== Biography ==
Born on 2 June 1868 in the Nørre-Snede Municipality, Mygdal was the daughter of Jes Mygdal (1819–1891) and his wife Charlotte (née Thorkildsen) (1832–1871). She attended Copenhagen's Arts and Crafts School for Women, where she studied embroidery and free-hand drawing. She also learned weaving at John Lenning's school in Norrköping, Sweden, graduating in 1895. She studied painting in the women's section of the Royal Danish Academy of Fine Arts, earning a painting diploma in 1904.

During her studies, she taught painting, drawing, design and handicrafts at the Arts and Crafts School. In 1897, in connection with an exhibition in Stockholm where she won a silver medal, she met Bernhard Olsen}, director of the Danish Folk Museum. He encouraged her to continue her studies in the history of textiles, giving her access to the museum's holdings. As a result, in 1898 she was able to publish an article on Dansk Hvidsøm (Danish White Stitch) in Tidsskrift for Kunstindustri.

In the early 20th century, Mygdal designed a series of white damask tableware patterns for De Forenede Linnedvarefabrikker. She also created works in colour for the churches in Valby and Herlufsholm. She developed a special interest in the white-stitch textiles known as Hedebo embroidery, lecturing on the subject in 1909.

In 1919, Olsen finally persuaded Mygdal to give up teaching at the Arts and Crafts School and move to the Folk Museum as an assistant curator. Her duties included teaching, acquiring textiles, cataloguing, and contributing articles to journals. These were mainly about tablecloths, church textiles, weaving and related techniques. In particular, she contributed articles to the Danish Tourist Board's yearbooks writing about costumes from various parts of the country, with titles beginning with Lidt om Dragter fra... followed by the region. In 1932, she published an authoritative, self-illustrated book on Amagerdragter, Vævninger og Syninger. She chose to write about costumes and textiles from Amager as she was able to cycle there to carry out her research. She retired from employment at the museum in 1935, as she suffered from poor health.

Elna Mygdal died in Frederiksberg on 1 February 1940 and is buried in Solbjerg Park Cemetery.
