= Henny Harald Hansen =

Danish anthropologist

- Born: Henny Plenge; 8 April 1900; Copenhagen, Denmark
- Died: 12 October 1993 (aged 93)
- Occupations: anthropologist, ethnographer
- Known for: studying Kurds, and in particular Kurdish women
- Notable work: Daughters of Allah: Among Muslim Women in Kurdistan, Kurdish Women's Lives: Field Research in a Muslim Society

Henny Harald Hansen (née Plenge; 8 April 1900 in Copenhagen – 12 October 1993) was a Danish anthropologist and ethnographer, best remembered for her publications Daughters of Allah: Among Muslim Women in Kurdistan (1958) and Kurdish Women's Lives: Field Research in a Muslim Society (1961), studying Kurds, and in particular Kurdish women.
