= Marie Luplau =

Danish painter (1848–1925)

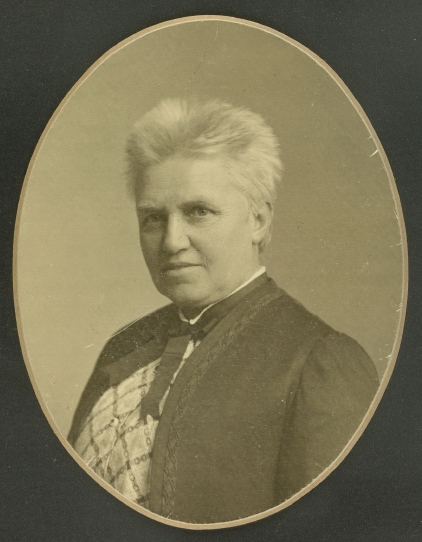
Marie Luplau by Julie Laurberg (c. 1910)

Henriette Marie Antonette Luplau (September 7, 1848 – August 16, 1925) was a Danish artist and educator, active in the women's movement. She conducted an art school for women in Copenhagen with her partner, artist Emilie Mundt.

== Early life and education ==
Marie Luplau was born in Varde on the Jutland Peninsula, the daughter of Daniel Carl Erhard Luplau, a village pastor, and Line Luplau, a feminist newspaper publisher and suffragist. She studied art with Vilhelm Kyhn, one of the few instructors in Copenhagen who was willing to accept female students. She spent several years pursuing further studies in Munich, and moved to Paris to study at the Académie Colarossi there.

In 1875, with support from the Danish Women's Association (DK), Luplau and five other women artists submitted applications to study at the Art Academy of Denmark; they were rejected not based on the quality of their work, but because the institution did not accept female students.

== Career ==
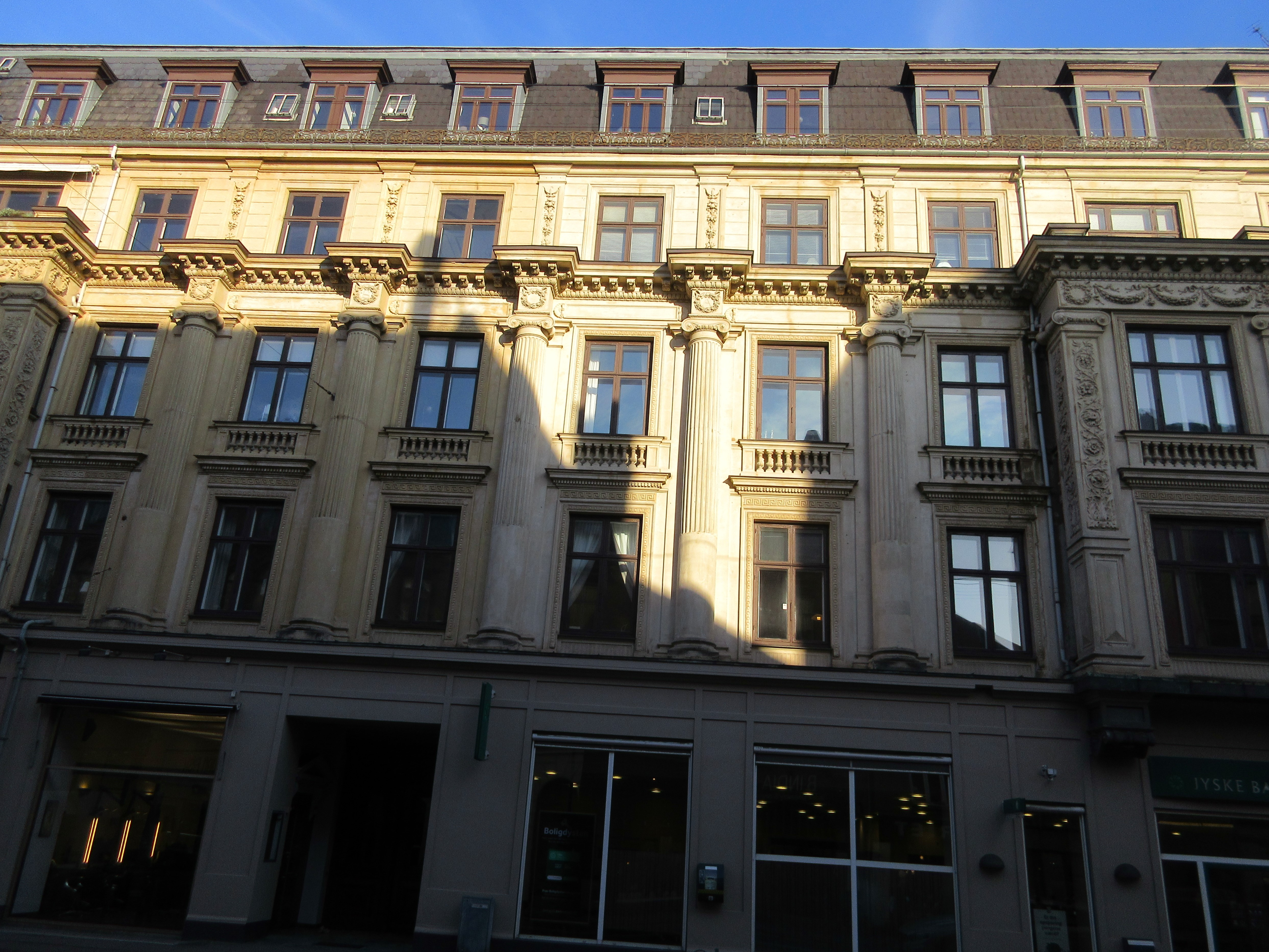
Gammel Kongevej 136-38; The building where Luplau's home and painting school was located on the top floor

In 1886, Marie Luplau and Emilie Mundt founded an art school in their home in Copenhagen, to prepare women for admission to the Art Academy's programs when they opened to women in 1888. The school operated until 1913. The school was located at Gammel Kongevej 136-38 in Frederiksberg. The building was owned by Albert Nicolai Schioldann. Among their notable students were Emilie Demant Hatt, Astrid Valborg Holm, and Olivia Holm-Møller.

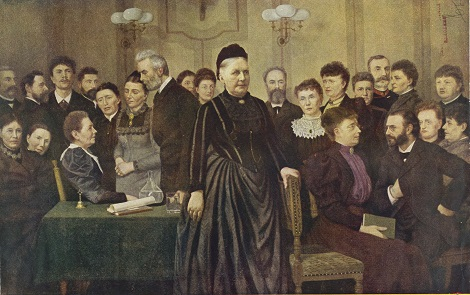
Marie Luplau, From the Early Days of a Women's Movement (1897)

She also wrote about women's health, bicycles and dress reform, all themes addressed in Luplau's 1894 essay "On Cycling for Women" ("Om Cykling for Damer").

Marie Luplau's 1917 painting of her mother and other early Danish feminists, "In the Early Days of the Women's Suffrage Campaign," hung for many years in the Danish Parliament building. The Women's Museum in Aarhus hosted a show of Luplau and Mundt's works in 2007.

== Personal life ==
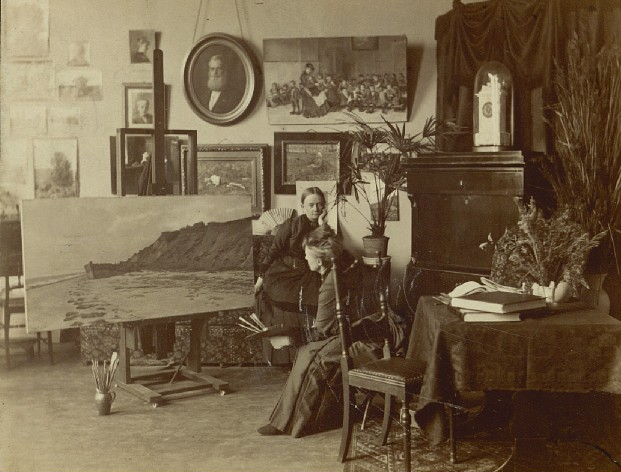
Mary Sten: Marie Luplau and Emilie Mundt in their Frederikberg home, c. 1885

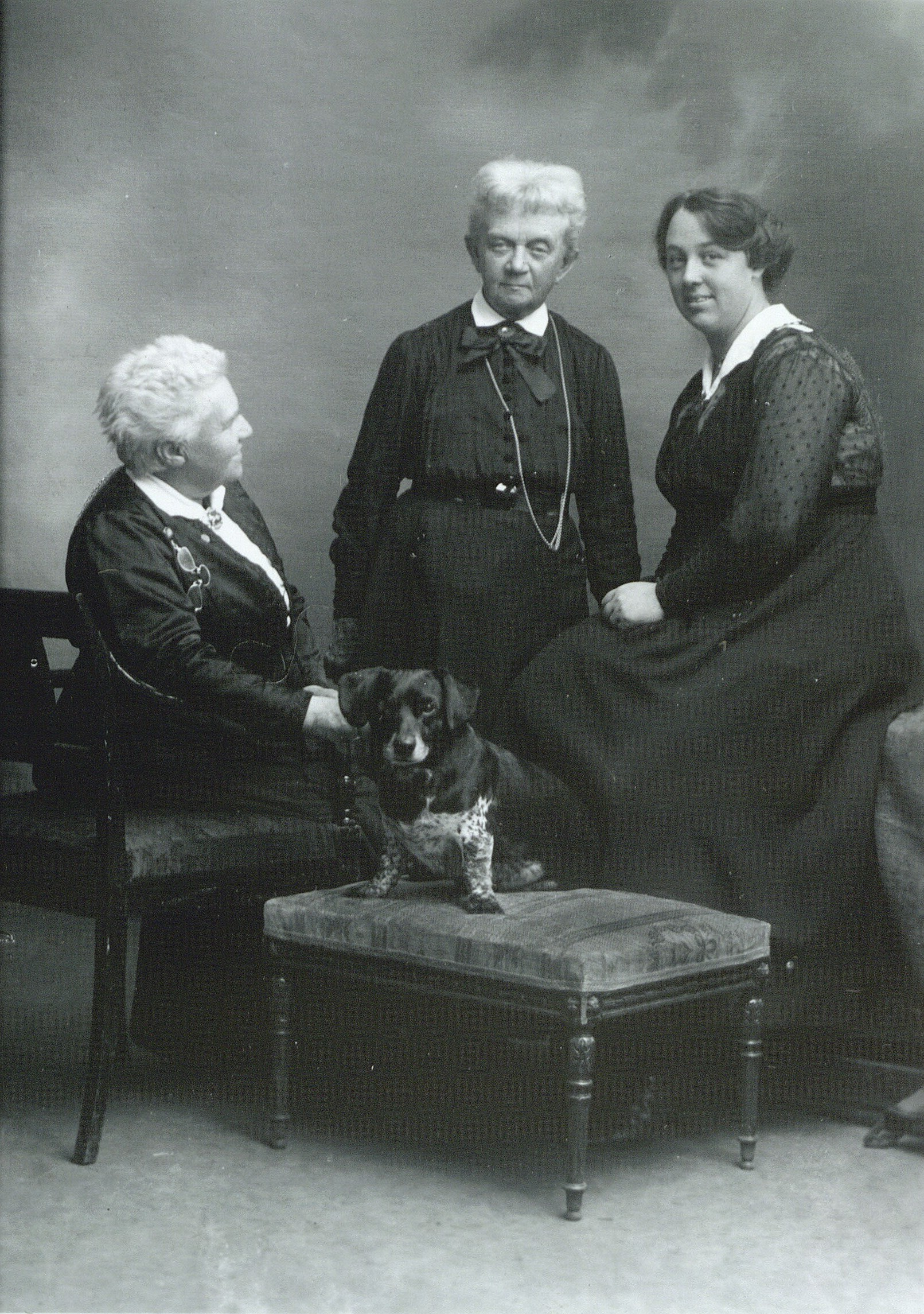
Marie Luplau and Emilie Mundt with their adopted daughter Carla Mundt Luplau (1915)

Marie Luplau met Emilie Mundt when they were both students of Vilhelm Kyhn. They lived and worked together for the rest of their lives, and in 1891 adopted a daughter, Carla Mundt-Luplau. Luplau was considered "mannish" in her appearance and habits, wearing short-cropped hair and tailored clothing, riding a bicycle and smoking cigars.

Marie Luplau died in 1925, age 76, three years after Emilie Mundt's death in 1922. The couple's graves are in Solbjerg Park Cemetery in Copenhagen.

== Gallery ==
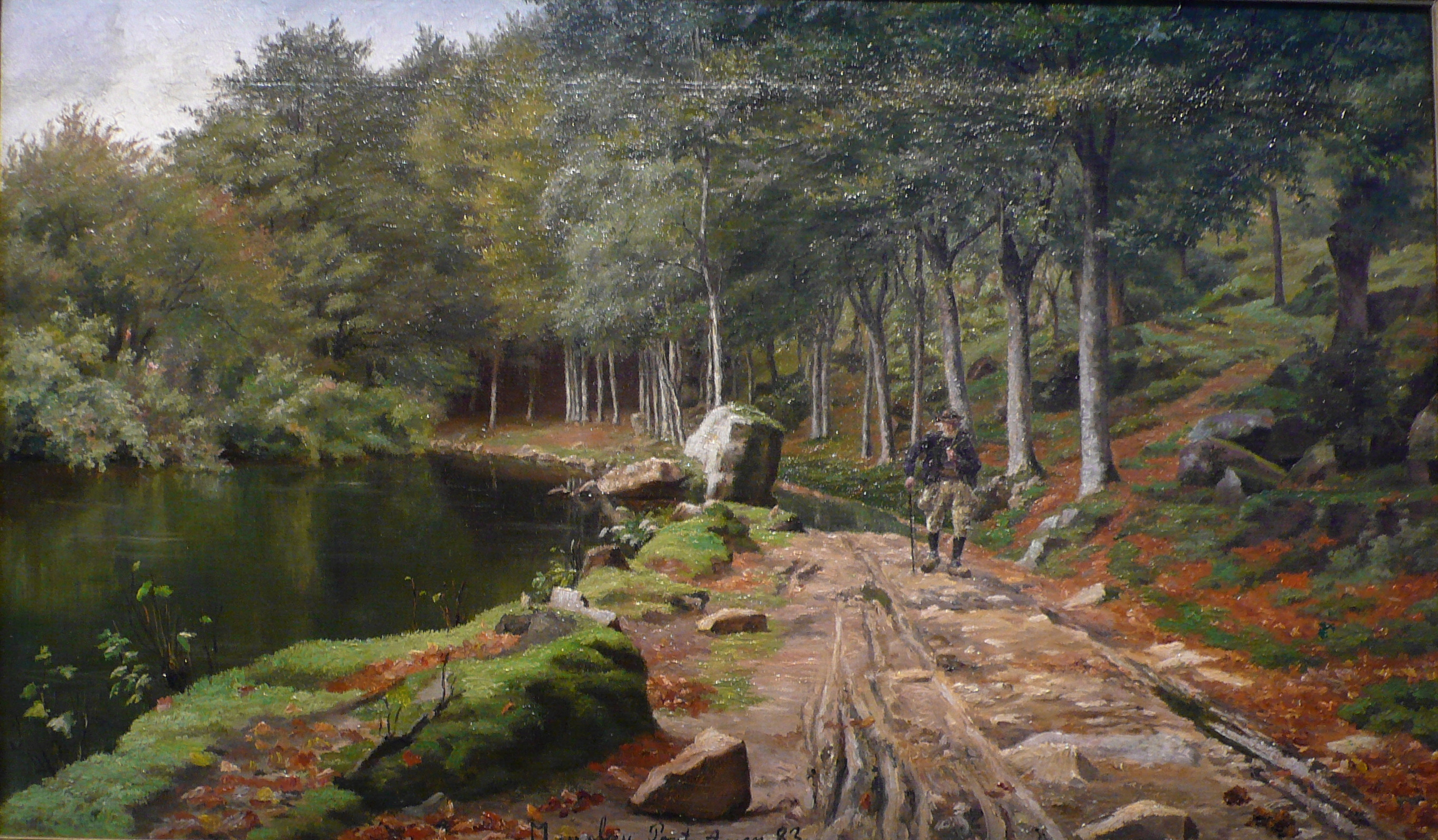
Le Bois d'Amour (1883)

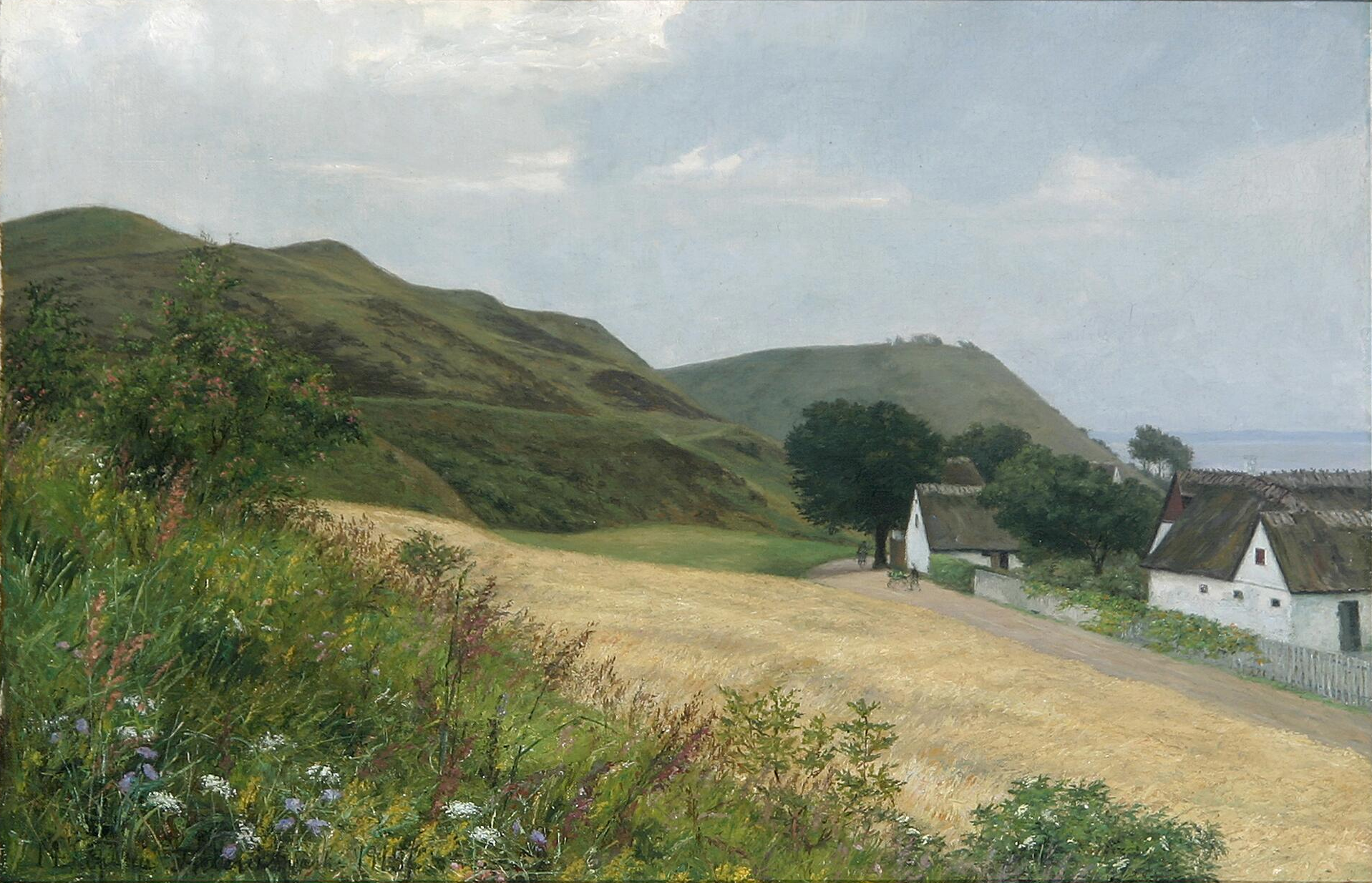
Summer Landscape Close to Frederiksvaerk

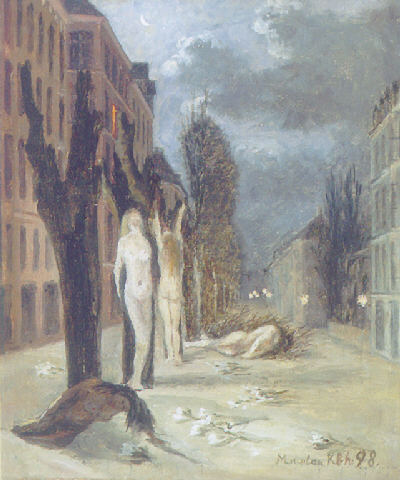
Symbolist Street Scene (1898)

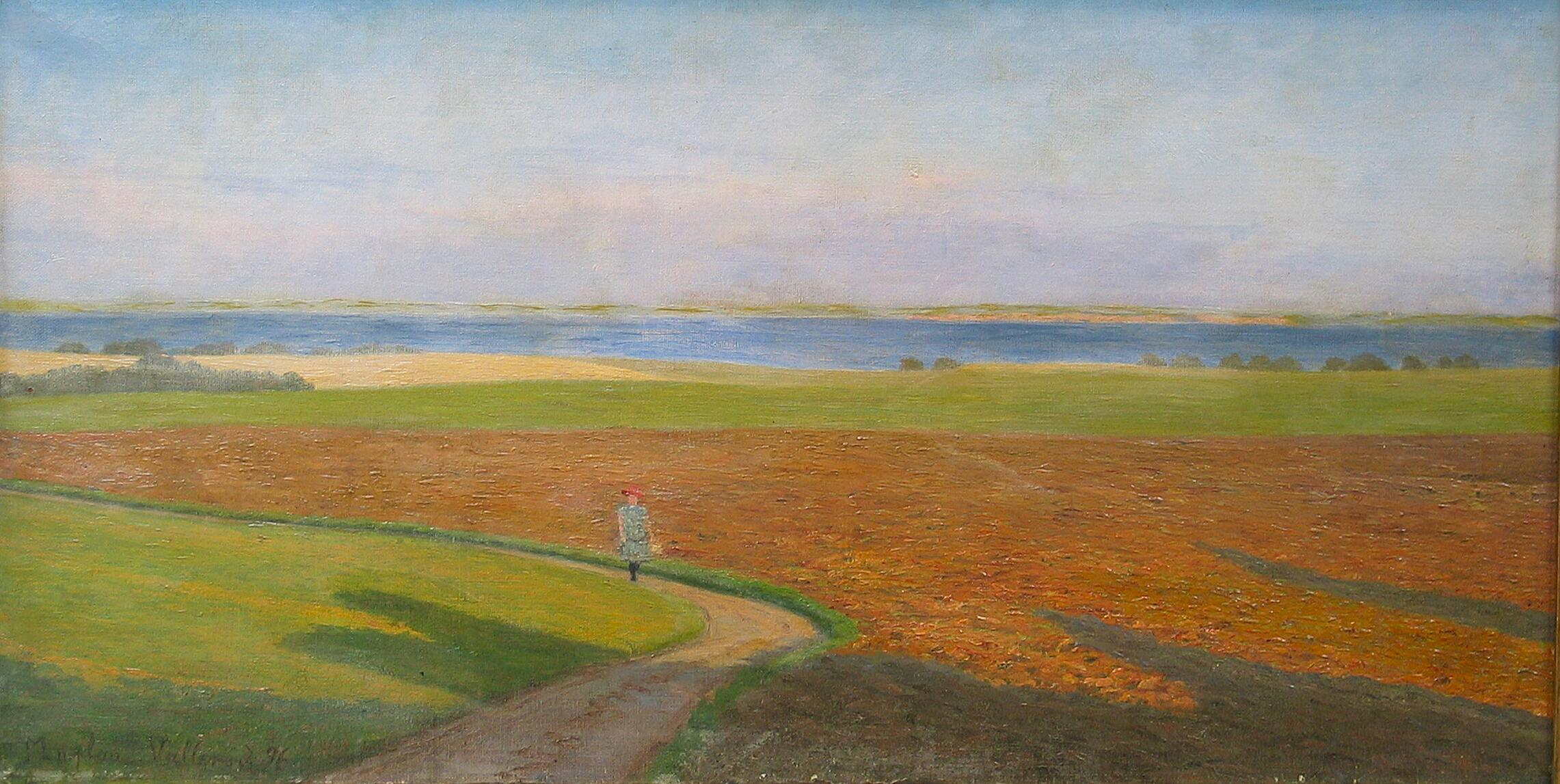
Landscape with woman walking (1997)
