= Helen Dohlmann =

Danish sculptor (born 1870)

- Born: October 21, 1870; Copenhagen, Denmark
- Died: May 27, 1942 (aged 71)
- Occupation: Sculptor

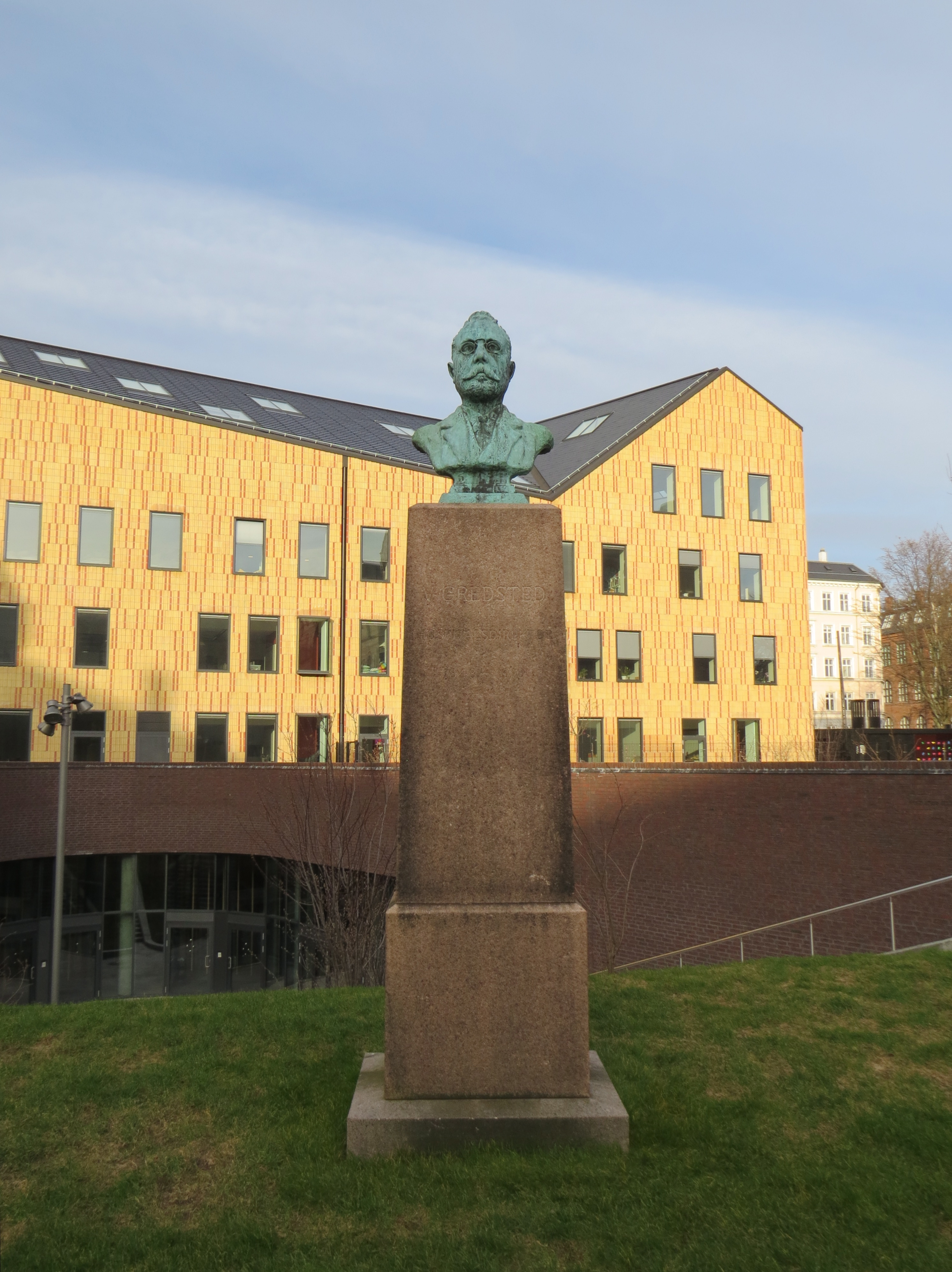
The Gredsted bust at the former Municipal Hospital in Copenhagen

Helen Sofie Dohlmann (21 October 1870 – 27 May 1942?) was a Danish sculptor.

== Biography ==
Dohlmann was born in Copenhagen in 1870. She studied with Paul Dubois and Jean Antoine Injalbert in Paris and later with Stephan Sinding in Copenhagen. She also studied painting with Richard Miller.

One of her earliest works, Sorg, sarkofag med figur, was exhibited at the Salon in Paris where it received a Mention Honorable It was later exhibited at Charlottenborg and in Munich. She participated in several competitions for public monuments in Denmark. Her works include a bust of hospital director H.V.S. Gredsted at the former Copenhagen Municipal Hospital, now part of University of Copenhagen's City Campus.

She remained unmarried and is buried at Solbjerg Park Cemetery in Frederiksberg.

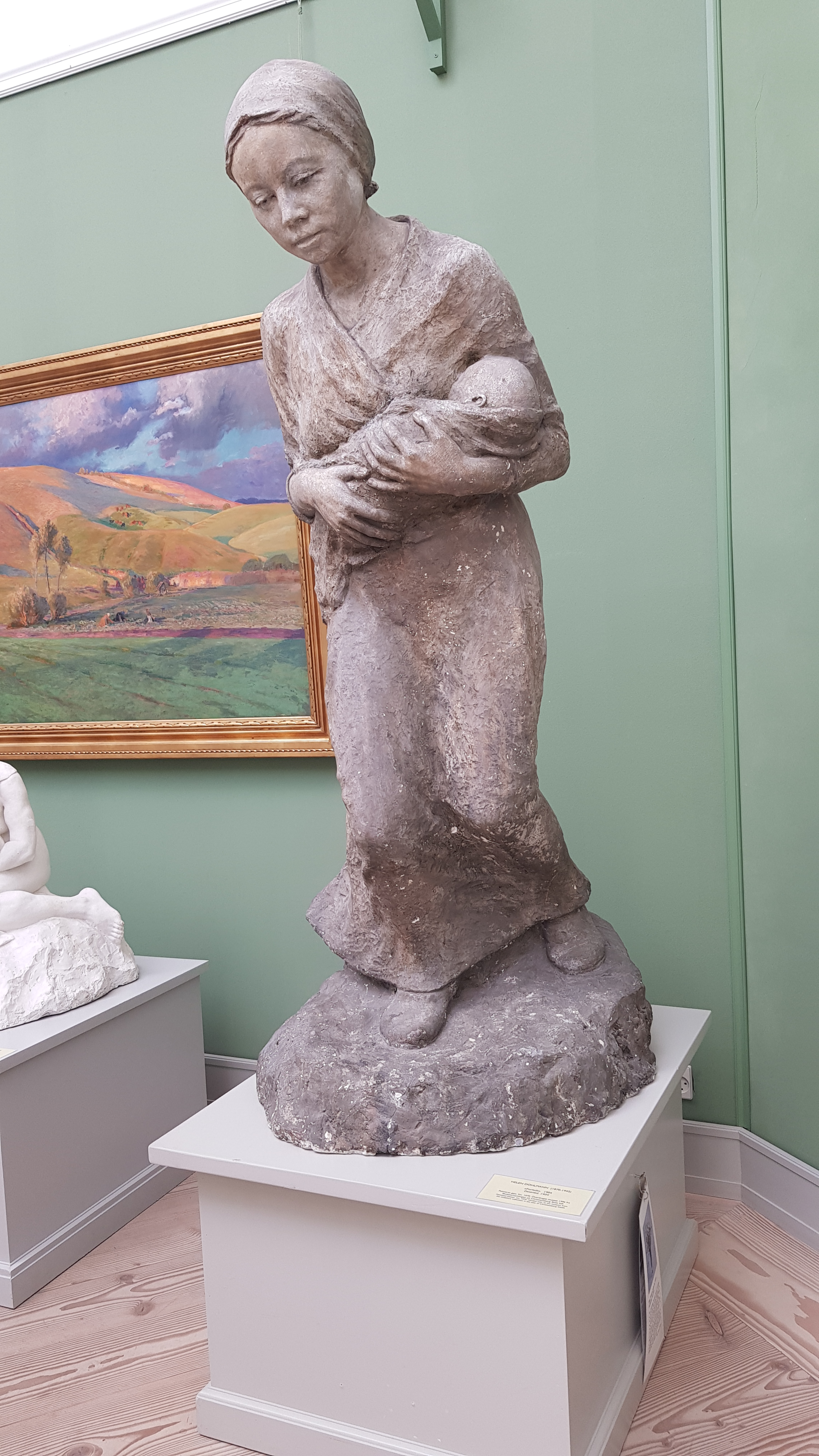
The statue "Forladt" in Vejen Kunstmuseum.

== Works ==
- En dreng, der spiller på fløjte (exhibited 1904)
- Sorg, sarkofag med figur
- Forladt, moder med barn (exhibited 1909)
- Hospitalsdirektør Gredsted (bust, bronze 1912, Copenhagen Municipal Hospital)
- Hagar og Ismael (plaster, udst. 1917); En dreng, der leger hest på en skildpadde (bronze, exhibited 1921)
