= Carl Emil Mundt =

Danish politician

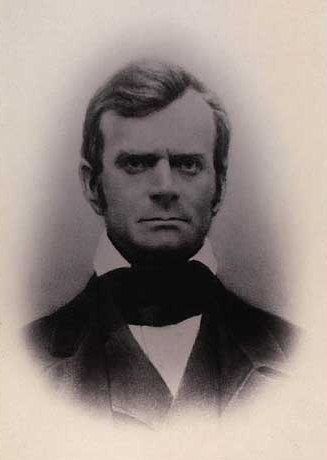
Carl Emil Mundt

Carl Emil Mundt (4 April 1802 – 22 December 1873) was a Danish educator and politician. He was a member of the 1848 Danish Constituent Assembly, representing Sorø. He was the father of painter Emilie Mundt.

== Early life and education ==
Mundt was born in Copenhagen, the son of goldsmith Philip Mundt (1740-1804) and Mette Christiane née Winther (1757-1827). He graduated from Metropolitan School in 1821. He visited Rngland together with his brother J.H. Mundt in 1925-26 and obtained a degree in theology from the University of Copenhagen in 1829. He obtained a master's degree in mathematics in 1842.

== Career ==
Mundt was employed as a mathematics teacher at Sorø Academy the following year. He left Sorø Academy in connection with its reorganisation in 1849 but was awarded a temporary compensation and title of professor and that same year. He was also accepted as a member of the Royal Danish Academy of Sciences. He moved to Frederiksberg a few years later and started working as a supervisor in the realskole system. He was awarded the Order of the Dannebrog in 1869.

== Politics ==
In 1848, Mundt was elected for the Danish Constituent Assembly in the Sorø Constituency. He became a member of the Landsting in 1854 but lost his mandate at the 1855 reelection.

== Written works ==
Mundt's only scientific work publications were his doctoral dissertation and one other work. He wrote a number of textbooks on mathematics and astronomy. These included:

- Elementær plangeometri (1838)
- Ledetråd ved regneundervisningen (1839)
- Eelementær stereometri
- Lærebog i astronomien (1855)
- Grundtræk af Astronomien (1859)
- Lærebøger i trigonometri (1857)
- Lærebog i algebra (1873)

== Personal life ==
Mundt married Caroline (Amalie) Jørgensen (1808-1845), a daughter of miller Hans Henrik Jørgensen (1772-1828) and Sophie Frederikke Pedersen (1776-1832), on 3 August 1833 in Bromme. They had three children: Lawyer Jodochus Henrik Mundt, painter Emilie Mundt and medical doctor Christopher Mundt.

He died on 22 December 1873 and is buried in Sorø Old Cemetery.
