= Henrik Ernst =

Henrik Ernst may refer to:

- Henrik Ernst (1603–1665), German-Danish jurist
- Henrik Ernst (born 1986), German footballer

== See also ==
- Heinrich Ernst
