= Frederik Vermehren =

Danish painter (1823–1910)

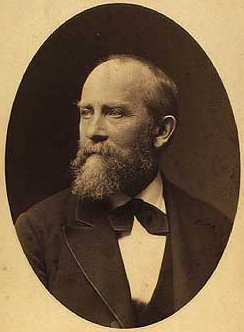
Frederik Vermehren (1890s) by Hansen, Schou & Weller

Johan Frederik (Frits) Nikolai Vermehren, also known as Frederik Vermehren (12 May 1823 – 10 January 1910), a genre and portrait painter in the realist style.

His artistic career took place during the period of Danish art known as the Golden Age of Danish Painting. Vermehren, along with his fellow artists Christen Dalsgaard (1824–1907) and Julius Exner (1825–1910), were prominent in the Danish genre of painting; they depicted ordinary people of the country, especially farmers and other country folk. His idealised depictions helped define and encourage Denmark's period of national romanticism.

== Early life ==
Vermehren was born on the island of Zealand at Ringsted, Denmark. He was the son of Peter Frederik Nikolai Vermehren and his wife, Sophie Amalie Franck.

At a young age, Vermehren worked in his father's workshop and did not have much opportunity to draw. However, he impressed Jørgen Roed (1808–1888), an artist who came from the same area. He began his artistic training in 1838, when he started drawing classes with landscape painter Hans Harder (1792–1873) at Sorø Academy. Vermehren's father did not want him to seek an art career, however the director of the Academy, poet Bernhard Severin Ingemann (1789–1862), intervened and convinced Frederik's father to let his son train as an artist.

== Training at the Academy ==
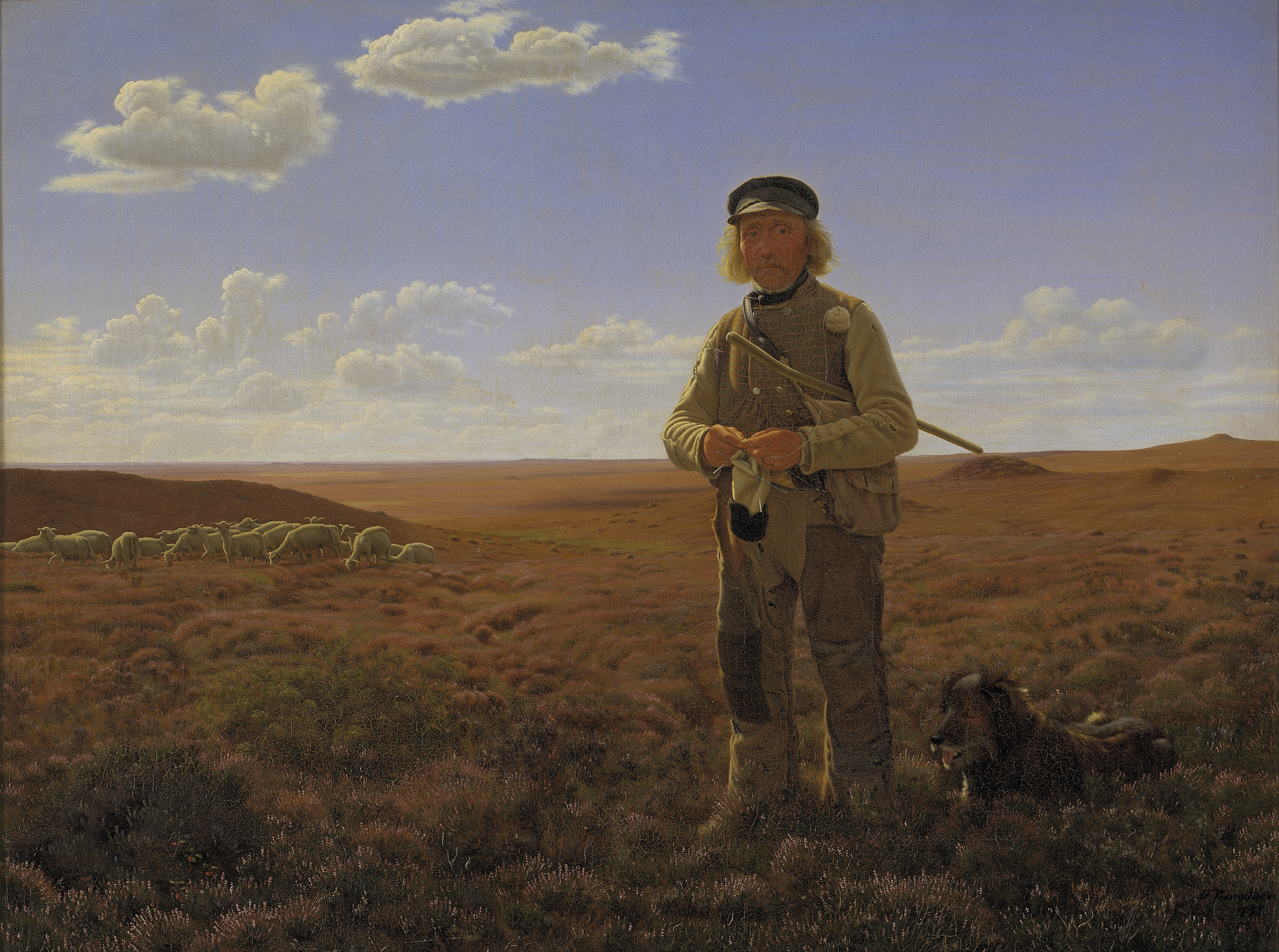
Frederik Vermehren, Fårehyrde på heden (Shepherd on the Heath), 1855, Statens Museum for Kunst

In 1844, Vermehren went to Copenhagen, where he became a student at the Royal Danish Academy of Art (Det Kongelige Danske Kunstakademi) and trained under Jørgen Roed. He exhibited his first painting, En Skomager i sit Køkken (A Shoemaker in his Kitchen) at Charlottenborg in 1847. This painting was purchased by King Christian VIII, and was praised by the art critic and national art form advocate Niels Lauritz Høyen (1798–1870). In 1848, Vermehren volunteered in the First war of Schleswig, but his health did not allow him to continue. On his return home, he painted Reservesoldatens Afsked fra sin Familie (exhibited in 1850) and now hangs in the collection of the Danish National Gallery.

In the years 1851–1854, Vermehren exhibited only a single painting while he completed several of his more important works. One particular work, Hvedebrødsmanden (painted in 1851), now hangs in the Hirschsprung Collection. En jysk Faarehyrde paa Heden (painted in 1853), was exhibited in 1855 in both Copenhagen and Paris.

== Travels ==
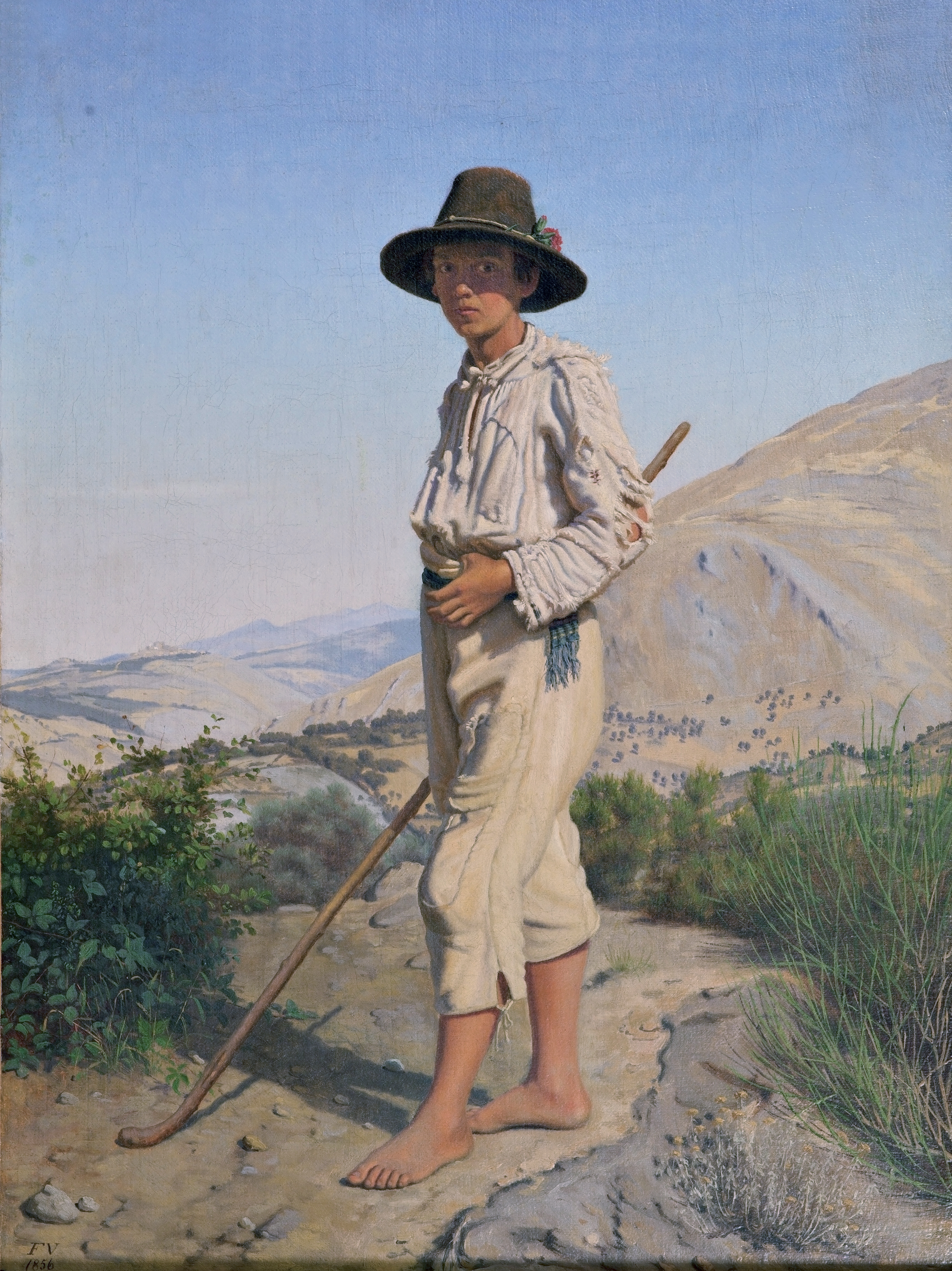
An Italian shepherd boy (1856)

In 1855, Vermehren traveled with the Academy's support for two years via Cologne, Antwerp, Brussels, and Switzerland to Italy (Cervera, Gerano, Florence, Venice and Rome). In Italy, he painted interiors, street scenes, landscapes and figure studies. Vermehren also spent a short time in Paris where A Sheepherder from Jutland on the Prairie was exhibited. He came to admire the work of the French classicists, particularly Jean-Louis-Ernest Meissonier. Several paintings based on Italian themes were exhibited including En italiensk Hyrdedreng and Parti fra Byen Gerano (both painted in 1858).

After his return to Denmark, Vermehren painted character studies, interior scenes, landscapes and genre paintings which were purchased by many Danish museums. In 1862, a stipend from the Ancker Fund (Det Anckerske Legat) allowed Vermehren to travel to the Netherlands, Paris and Rome.

== An artistic and academic career ==
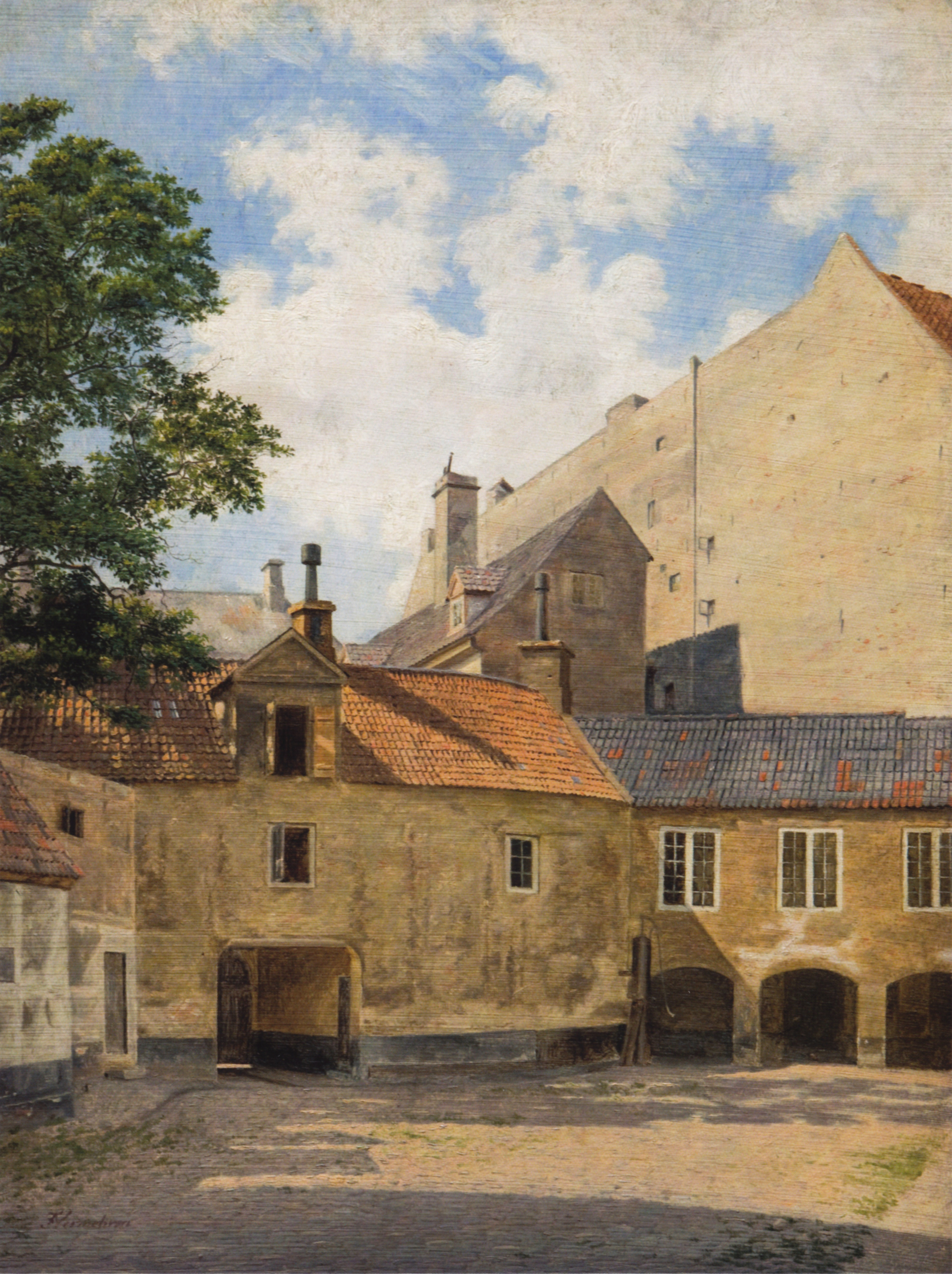
The Courtyard of Thott Mansion. (1845) Hirschsprung Collection

Vermehren became a member of the Royal Danish Academy of Fine Arts in 1864, and began teaching there in 1865. Among his students were P. S. Krøyer (1864–1870), Kristian Zahrtmann (1864–1868), Vilhelm Hammershøi (1864–1916) and Michael Ancher (1849– 1927). As a member of the Exhibition Committee at Charlottenborg, his work was exhibited at the Nordic Exhibition in 1872, 1883 and 1888.

Vermehren continued to paint character paintings and genre paintings of Danish scenes however, from 1870 on, he was known primarily for his portraits. During this time he painted portraits of painters Jørgen Sonne and P. C. Skovgaard, and sculptor professor August Vilhelm Saabye, among others. Having traveled to Paris in 1875, he taught at the school for Drawing and Applied Arts for Women between 1877 and 1907. Afterwards, Vermehren traveled to Berlin, Dresden, and Munich in 1883, along with architect Ferdinand Meldahl.

Vermehren was given the honorable title Commander of the Dannebrog in 1892. While in his 60s, he served as a member of the Commission for National Purchase of Artworks between 1890 and 1896. In 1907, his works were exhibited at the exhibition "Danish Painters" at Guildhall, London.

== Personal life ==
Vermehren married Thomasine Ludvigne Grimer on 7 July 1857. They were the parents of Sophus Vermehren (1866-1950) and Gustav Vermehren (1863-1931) both of whom would grow up to be painters. Vermehren died on 10 January 1910 in Copenhagen at the age of 86 and was buried in Assistens Cemetery.

== Works ==
Since Vermehren's death, his works have been shown in numerous exhibitions in Denmark. His work was shown in Rome in 1977, where his paintings were part of an exhibition of Danish paintings made in Rome during the 1800s. His works are in the collection of many Danish museums, including the National Art Museum, the Hirschsprung Collection, the Ny Carlsberg Glyptotek, and local art museums in Aarhus, West Zealand, and Koldinghus.

== Other sources ==
- Kunstindeks Danmark ("Art Index Denmark")
- Danish Biographical Encyclopedia @ Projekt Runeberg
