= Johan Theodor Holmskjold =

Danish noble, botanist, courtier and administrator

Johan Theodor Holmskiold
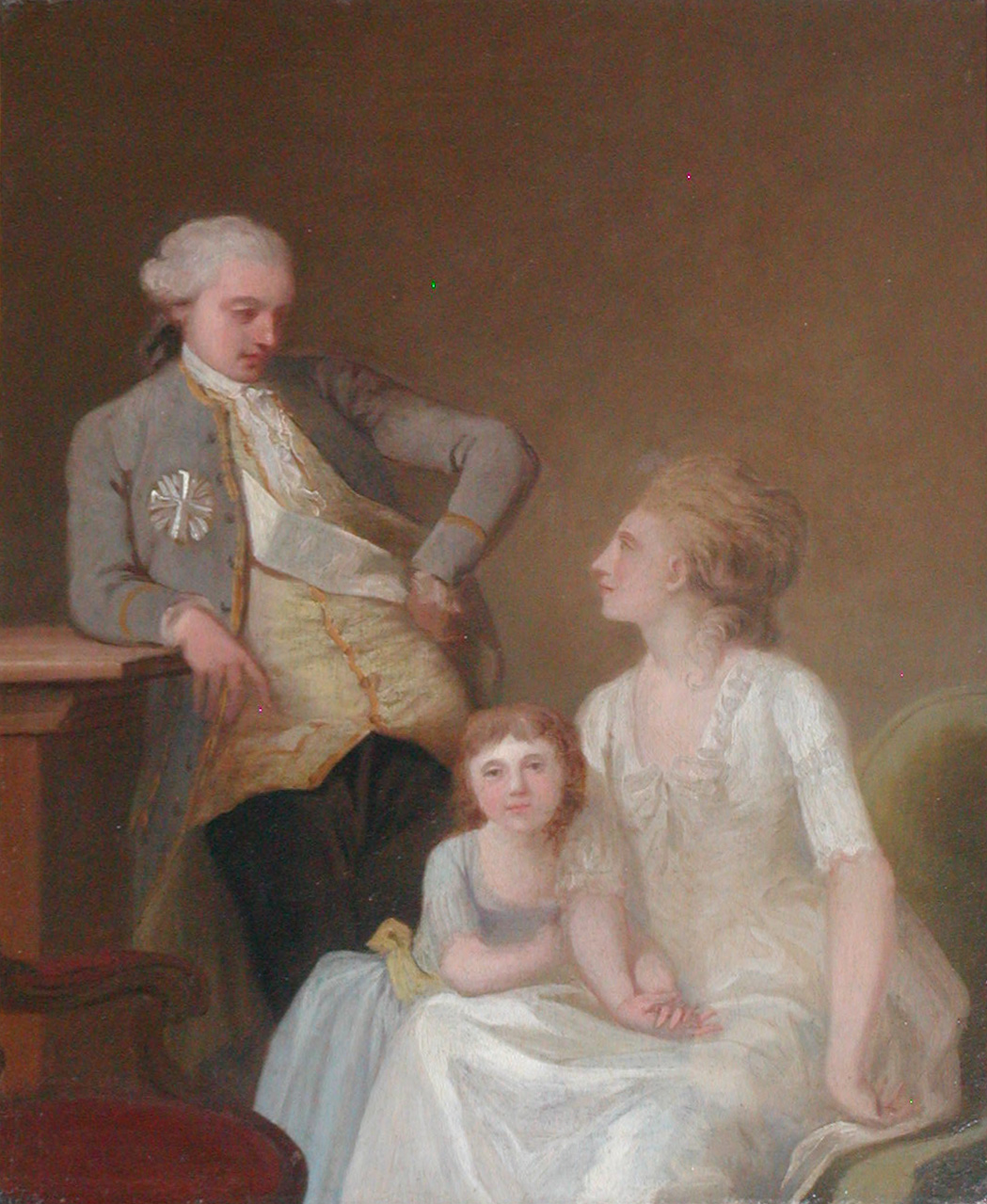
- Johan Theodor Holmskiold with his family, painting by Jens Juel (1785)
- Born: 14 June 1731; Nyborg, Denmark
- Died: 15 February 1793 (aged 61); Copenhagen, Denmark
- Education: University of Copenhagen
- Occupations: Administrator, botanist

Johan Theodor Holmskiold (14 June 1731 – 15 September 1793) was a Danish noble, botanist, courtier and administrator. He was noted for his scientific work with fungi and development of the Charlottenborg Botanical Garden. His career included work as director of the Danish Postal Services and the Royal Porcelain Factory.

== Early life and career ==
Johan Theodor Holm was born in Nyborg on the Danish island of Funen as the oldest of eight children to Nicolai Holm and Cathrine Lucie née v. Lengerchen. He first trained with his father who was a surgeon before studying medicine at the University of Copenhagen, graduating in 1760.

During the last three years of his studies, from 1757 to 1761, he toured Europe with professor Christen Friis Rottbøll (1727-1797) who paid for his travels. They visited a number of universities in Germany, the Netherlands and France and formed many close bonds with prominent colleagues. In Leiden and Paris, Holm collected specimens for a herbarium which was later presented to the King as a gift.

In 1762, he became a professor in medicine and natural history at Sorø Academy. There he founded a botanical garden before leaving the academy with a pension in 1765. At that point he also abandoned his medical career for good, instead turning to various administrative pursuits and his interest in botany.

== Holmskiold ==
In 1767, Holm was appointed director general of the Danish Postal Services in Copenhagen, a position which he held until his death in 1793. From 1772, he also served as cabinet secretary for Dowager Queen Juliana Maria, stepmother of King Christian VII.

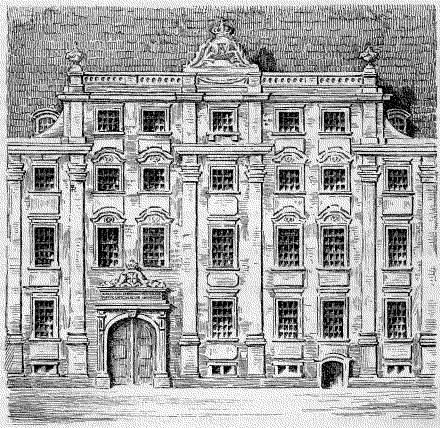
The Royal Porcelain Factory, at Holmskiold's time located in a former post office in Køgmagergade

Due to his good relations with the royal family, particularly the Queen, he was in the early 1770s, contacted by Frantz Heinrich Müller (1773–1801), a pharmacist and mineralogist who was setting up a porcelain factory. This led to the foundation of the Royal Danish Porcelain Factory in 1775, with the King as a co-owner, Queen Juliana Maria as a protector and Holm as its first director-in-chief. In 1779, he took full control of the company and remained head of the factory for the rest of his life.

In 1778, he was appointed as one of two directors for the new Charlottenborg Botanical Garden. It was created as a joint venture between the University of Copenhagen and the King, each of whom was to appoint a director. The first university appointment was Christen Friis Rottbøll, Holm's old teacher and travel companion from his student years, while the King chose Holm. Holm advanced rapidly through the ranks and was ennobled under the surname of Holmskiold in 1781. On the same occasion, he was made a Knight of the Order of the Danneborg and was given the title of Geheimrat (Gehejmeråd).

In 1785, he oversaw the reorganization of the library of the Royal Danish Academy of Sciences and Letters, contributing a personal collection of botanical texts and sponsoring the acquisition of foreign journals. His efforts helped improve access to recent scientific developments for Danish scholars and students.

== Beata ruris otia fungis Danicis Impensa ==
As a botanist, Holmskiold is remembered for his work Beata ruris otia fungis Danicis Impensa (1790-1796), a celebrated two-volume work on fungi. The first volume was not published until 1790, and the second posthumously in 1796, but the work relies on the studies he conducted during the two years he spent in Aarhus after leaving Sorø Academy and prior to his employment with the Danish Postal Services. In Aarhus, Holmskiold had observed and documented the fungi he found and he also commissioned artist Johann Adolph Neander (1742-1766) to make detailed full-scale drawings of the specimens he collected and described.

Holmskjold's initial engagement with the postal services was most likely a fairly easy task which left him with sufficient time to work on his study of fungi. A first draft, at least of the first volume, was completed as early as 1770. It focused on Agaricaceae, Clavariaceae and Discomycetes, but Holmskiold was dissatisfied with the book and chose not to publish it at this stage, probably because he got distracted by other pursuits.

Among its 74 described specimens, Beata Ruris Otia Fungis Danicis Impensa contains 57 newly named fungi, five new combinations and 52 totally new taxa. The work received particular appreciation for its renderings, prompting the Swedish botanist Anders Jahan Retzius (1742–1821) to call it "the most brilliant work which had appeared up to that time". He went on to name a genus of flowering shrubs Holmskioldia in Holmskjold's honour. The Harvard University Herbaria describes the illustrations as "stunningly rendered, impeccably accurate, and beautiful illustrations.

In 1776, Holdskjold became a member of the Royal Danish Academy of Sciences and Letters and published several articles in its various journals, including one on catfish which relied on his observations in Sorø Lake during his years at Sorø Academy.

== Illustrations from Beata Ruris Otia Fungis Danicis Impensa ==
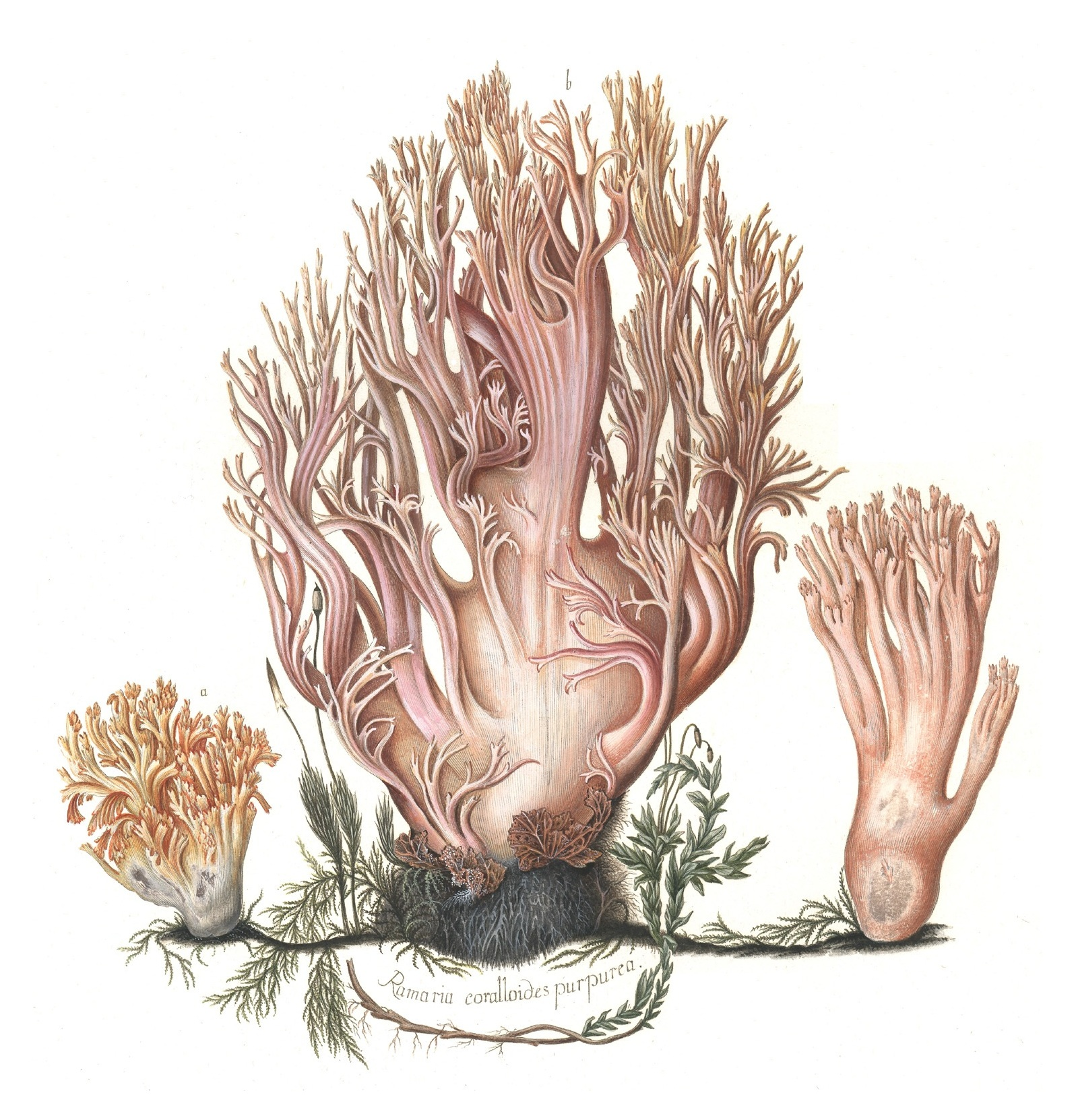
Illustration of Ramaria Corralloides Purpurea

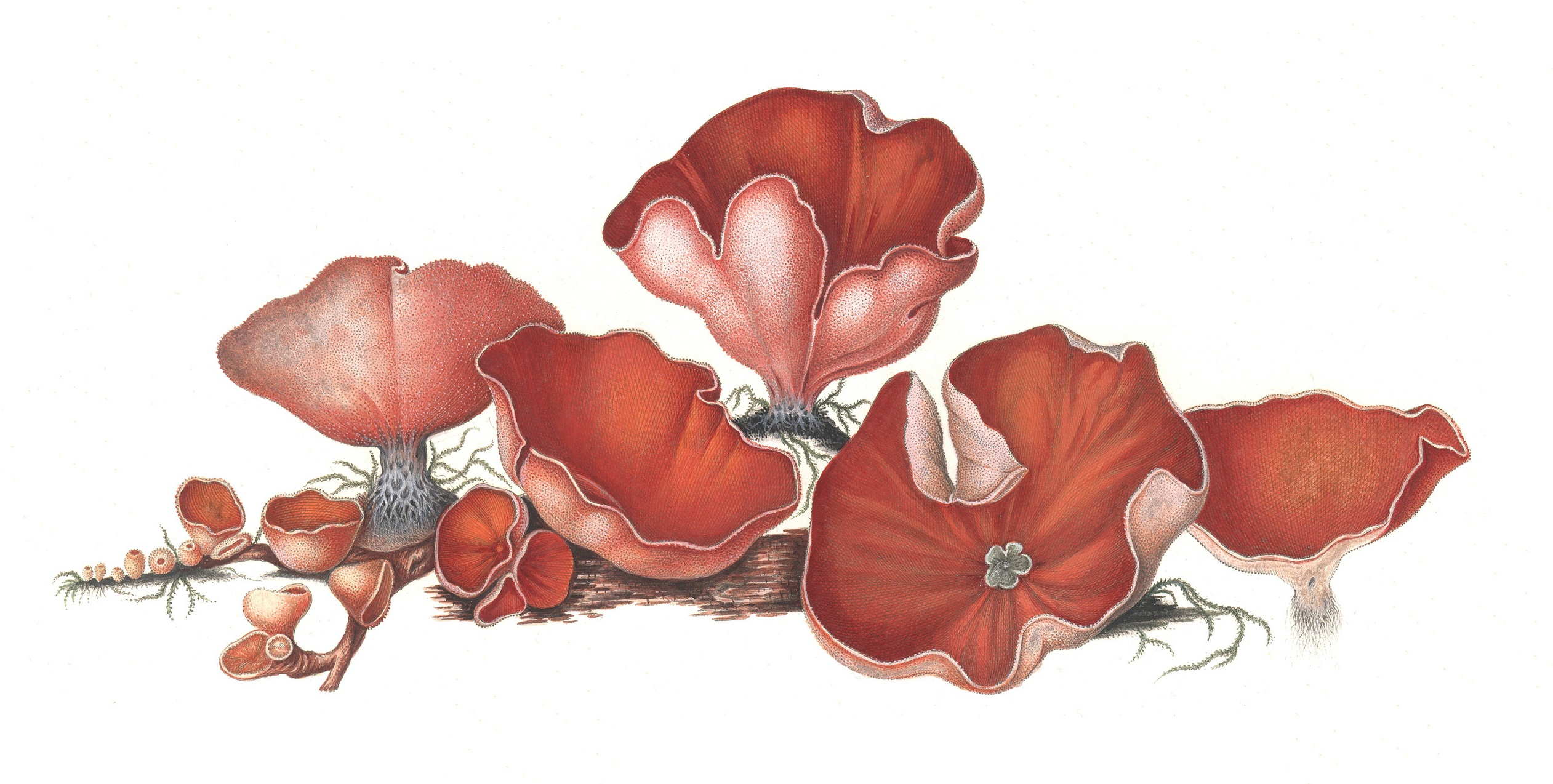
Illustration of Peziza Dichroa

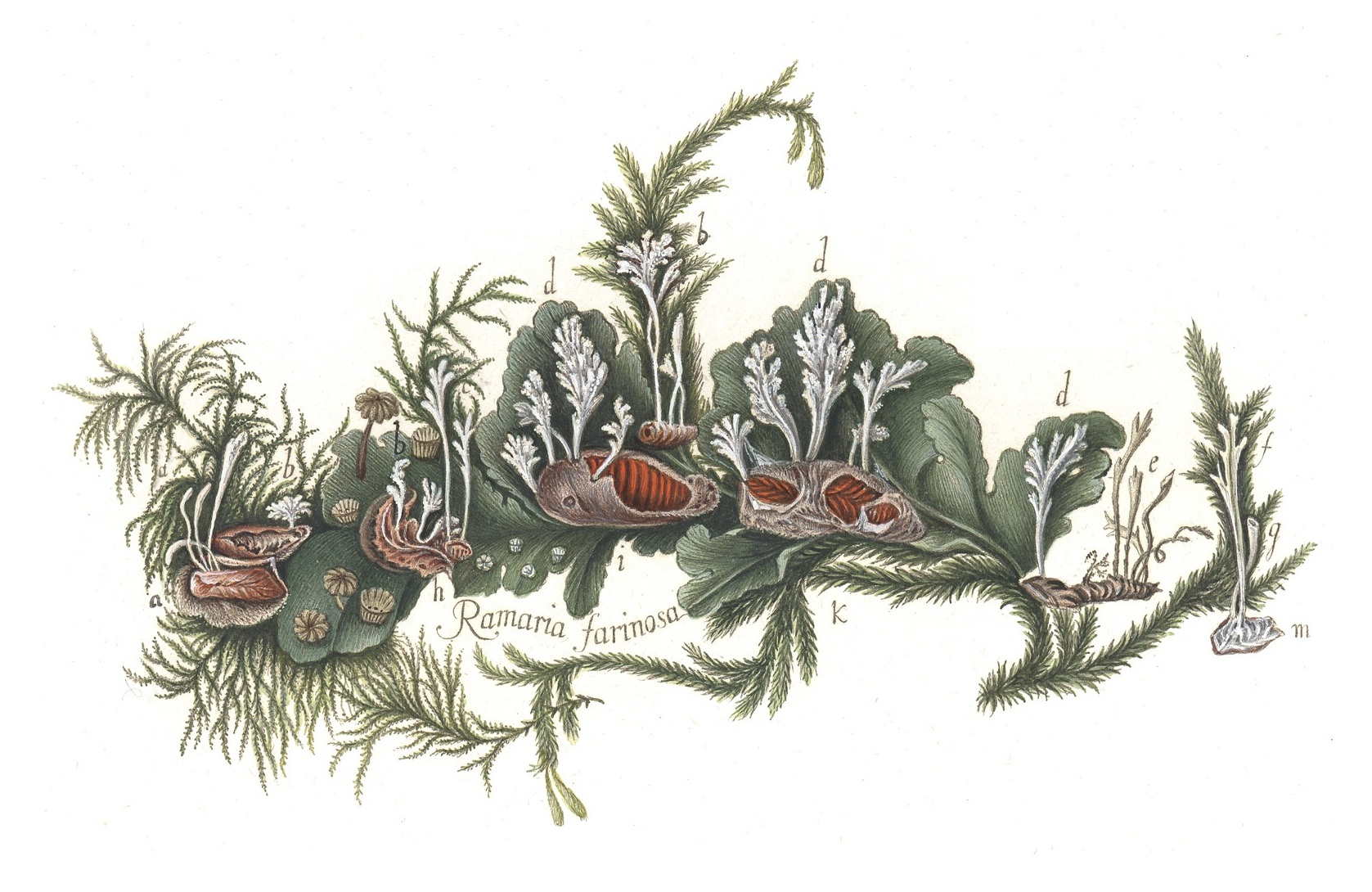
Illustration of Ramaria farinosa

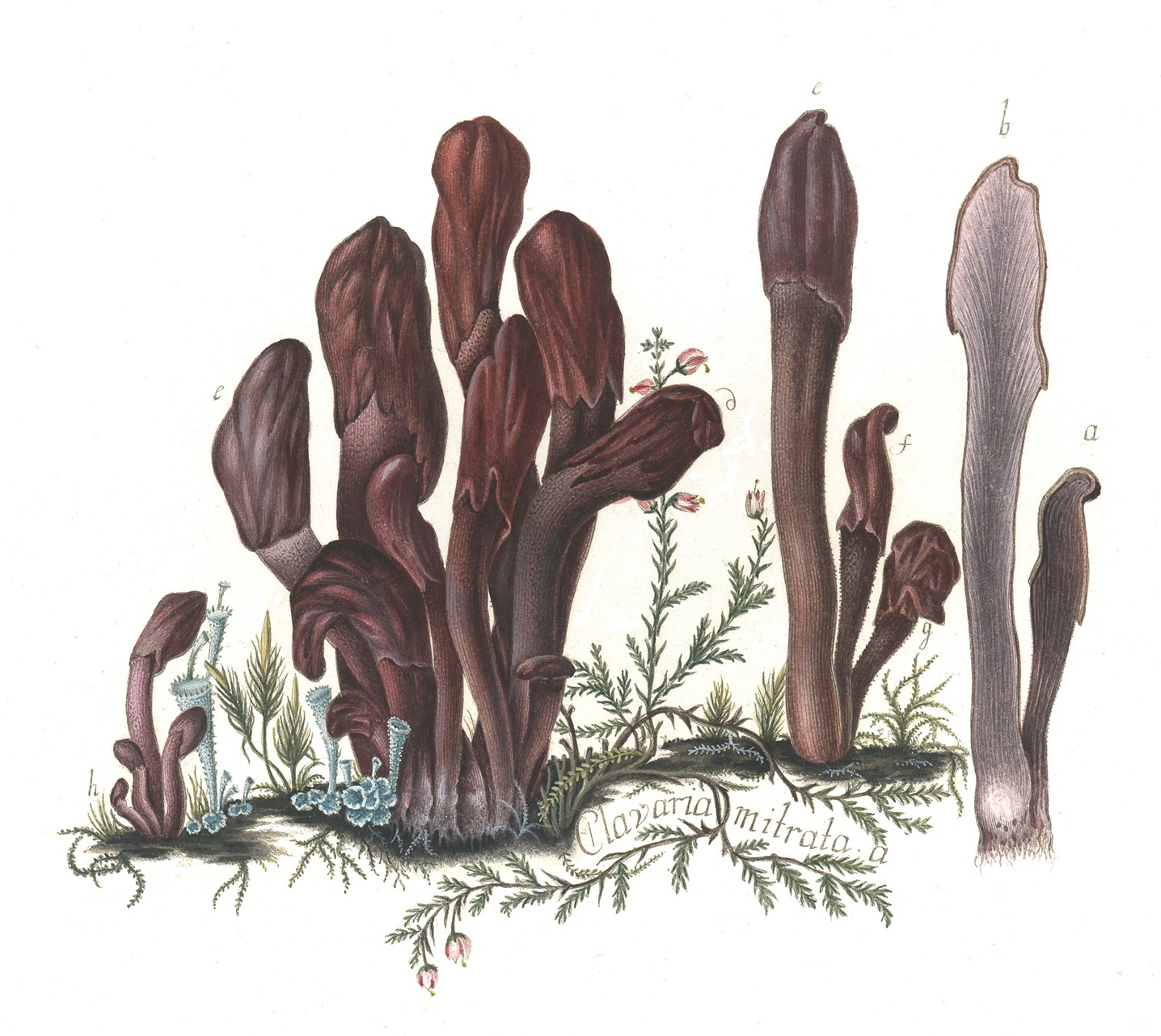
Illustration of Clavaria Mitrata

== Private life ==
In 1768, shortly after his appointment as general director of the Postal Services, Holmskiold built a country house on the shore of Lake Bagsværd in Frederiksdal north of Copenhagen. He named it Sophienholm after his fiancée Sophia Magdalena de Schrødersee (1746–1801). They married on 21 December 1770.

In 1782, the year after his ennoblement, he commissioned the architect Joseph Guione to build him a new and larger country house on a tract of land at the southern tip of Lake Bagsværd. The building, which became known as Aldershvile, was not completed until 1790. It was a white building with a hipped roof clad in blue-glazed tiles and was surrounded by a 12-hectare English-style landscaped garden with a canal system.

Johan Theodor Holmskiold died in 1793, not long after the completion of his new home. Royal historian Peter Frederik Suhm (1728–1798), wrote an epitaph in Latin about him. It turned out that he was heavily indebted and that he was guilty of embezzlement against both the Queen, the Postal Services and the Royal Porcelain Factory. The Aldershvile estate was subsequently sold to Adolph Ribbing (1765–1843), a Swedish count who had been exiled for his involvement in the murder of King Gustav III of Sweden.

== See also ==
- Flora Danica
