= Gråbrødretorv 15 =

Listed building in Copenhagen

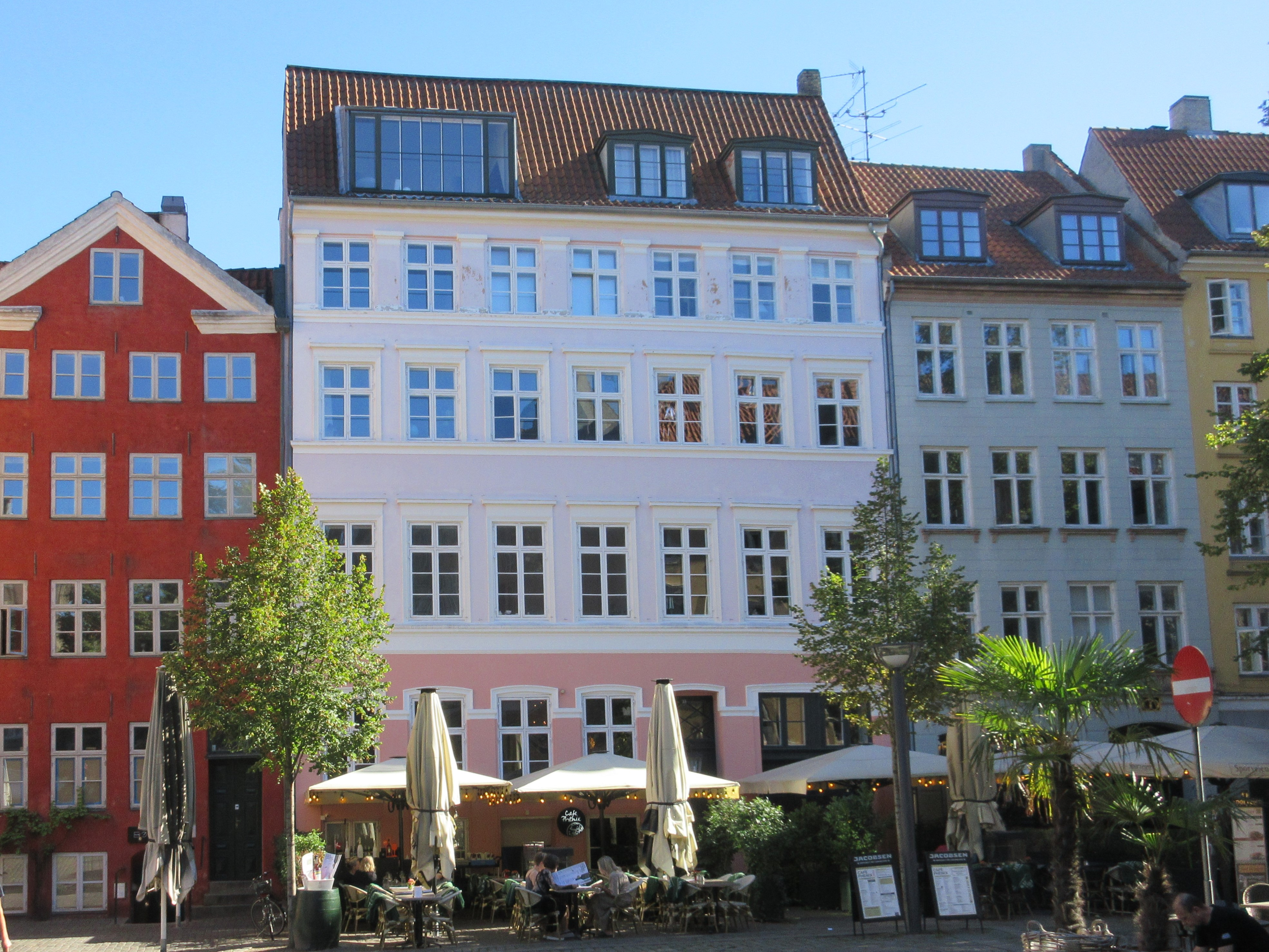
- Interactive map of the Gråbrødretorv 15 area

General information
- Location: Copenhagen, Denmark
- Coordinates: 55°40′46.2″N 12°34′32.92″E
- Completed: C. 1730s
- Renovated: 1851–52 (heightened)

Gråbrødretorv 15 is a historic building situated on the south side of Gråbrødretorv in the Old Town of Copenhagen, Denmark. Constructed with two storeys in the first half of the 18th century, as part of the rebuilding of the city following the Copenhagen Fire of 1728, it was adapted into a four-storey, three-winged building in the 1850s. The building was listed on the Danish registry of protected buildings and places in 1945. The scope of the heritage listing was expanded in 1982. The property belonged to the painter Peter Brünniche from the 1770s to at least 1806. Other notable former residents include the master carpenter and politician Harald Kayser, painter Julius Exner and jurist Carl Georg von Holck.

== Architecture ==
The building was originally a two-storey building. The seven-bat-wide facade was crowned by a five-bay gabled wall dormer. A four bays long side wing extended from the rear side of the building along the east side of the courtyard. This building was heightened with two storeys in 1851–52. The eastern side wing was also heightened with two storeys. A newfour bays long and four storeys tall side wing was also constructed along the other (western) side of the courtyard. The facade is finished with a cornice band above the ground floor, sill courses below the first- and second-floor windows and polaster-like ornamentation between the windows of the fourth floor. The main entrance is located in the fifth bay from the left (east). The building is topped by a Mansard roof clad in red tiles. The large windows in the left-hand side of the roof (as seen from the square) may date from Julius Exner's studio. The yard-side of the building is painted yellow.
