= Niels Laurits Høyen =

Danish art historian and critic (1798–1870)

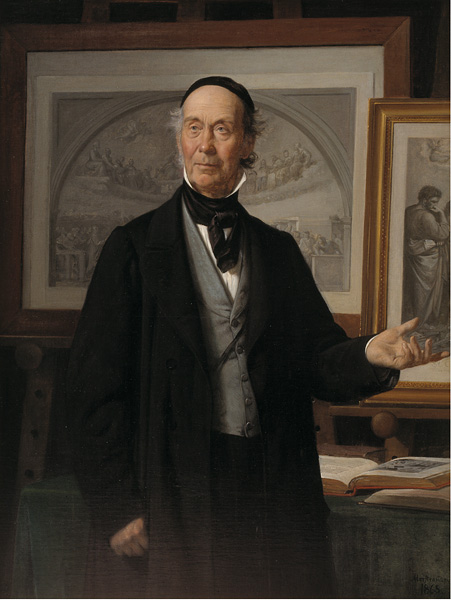
- Wilhelm Marstrand, Niels Laurits Høyen, 1868
- Born: 4 June 1798; Copenhagen, Denmark
- Died: 29 April 1870 (aged 71); Copenhagen, Denmark
- Occupations: Art historian, critic and administrator
- Known for: First Danish art historian and critic Promoting National Romanticism

Niels Laurits Andreas Høyen (4 June 1798 – 29 April 1870) is considered to be the first Danish art historian and critic. He promoted a Danish nationalistic art through his writings and lectures, and exerted a far reaching effect on contemporary artists. His work in various cultural institutions helped steer the development of Danish art during the mid-19th century.

== Early life and education ==
Høyen was born in Copenhagen to distiller Anders Larsen Høyen and wife, Inger Margrethe. He was bright and did well in school. He was an avid reader, and was interested in art and history. He was lucky to have access to the day's cultured homes that had been opened up to gifted students from modest backgrounds. He started his higher education in 1816. He first studied law, then theology, and then history, before finalising his studies with art history. He received a cand.phil.

He then became a student at the Drawing School of the Royal Danish Academy of Art (Det Kongelige Danske Kunstakademi) where he learned perspective and anatomy, and had access to such artists as Christoffer Wilhelm Eckersberg, Christian David Gebauer and Jens Peter Møller. He took part in establishing the Student Union.

With economic support from his father he left Copenhagen in September 1822 for a three-year student travel through Germany, Austria and Italy

== Early career ==
He was given the opportunity to give lectures at the Art Academy during the winter 1826-1827 on antique paintings. He was one of the founding members of the Art Union (Kunstforeningen) in 1827, and he helped edit the first three volumes of "Maanedsskrift for Litteratur" ("Monthly Journal of Literature") in 1829. He resided in Hillerød a short time in 1828, during which time he became familiar with the large collection of artwork, mainly portraits, which were housed in Frederiksborg Castle, now The Museum of National History with Denmark's most important collection of portraits and history paintings.

Høyen's interest and enthusiasm for Danish art history was noticed by such influential men as Finance Deputy Jonas Collin, who has also participated in establishing the Art Union and was Secretary for the royal discretionary funds. These funds were used in 1829 to give Høyen a one-time grant to travel and study preservation-worthy art in the Danish provinces. Høyen traveled to Kronborg, Lund (Lund Cathedral), Lübeck, Holstein and some areas in Schleswig registering Denmark's national treasures. The one-time grant was again given to Høyen in 1830, and in 1832 he received a two-year grant.

With Professor Niels Iversen Schow's retirement in February 1829, he became Professor of History and Mythology at the Academy of Art, of which art history was a part of the curriculum. Soon art history became the focus of his teaching, and in 1831 focus was also placed on his compiling a history of Danish art.

He married Edele Birgitte Westengaard on 8 April 1832.

== Høyen's profound reach on Danish art life ==
The Art Union sponsored competitions which set its mark on artists' production. In its competition of 1834 one of the subjects was landscape painting featuring a Danish locale. Another that same year called for an interior or exterior view of a noteworthy or characteristic Danish building or public place. These competitions inspired Golden Age of Painting artists Christen Købke, Jørgen Roed and Constantin Hansen to paint such national-historical treasures as Danish church interiors and exteriors and views of Danish castles. The Art Union's purchases of art work helped support artists in a time of dwindling royal economic support. Christen Købke's first mature work "View of Århus Cathedral" (Parti af Århus Domkirke), painted in 1829, was purchased by the Art Union and is now in the collection of the Danish National Gallery (Statens Museum for Kunst).

His notes from his travels around Denmark are kept in the archives of the National Museum of Denmark, and these have served as the basis for a national understanding of Denmark's art history. His view and understanding of the nation's treasures, have helped other's understand the importance of works found throughout the country. He provided advice to artists, and was up-to-date on new developments.

In 1836 he was awarded a royal grant to travel to Paris on art historical research.

In 1839 he took over the position of Inspector of the Royal Painting Collection after Johan Conrad Spengler's death, and then became Director of the same after the death of Christian Jurgensen Thomsen in 1865. The old collection, which was housed in the recently rebuilt Christiansborg Palace, was resuscitated as Høyen removed lesser works, moved important works over from royal residences and castles throughout the country, and arranged the works for best effect. Additionally he was instrumental in the purchase of new works by the country's prominent new artists.

In March 1844 he held his famous lecture "Om Betingelserne for en skandinavisk Nationalkonsts Udvikling" ("On the conditions for the development of a Scandinavian National Art"), which inspired many to search out a new national and Scandinavian understanding of culture and art. This inspired genre artists, such as Frederik Vermehren, Julius Exner and Christen Dalsgaard, as well as landscape artists such as Johan Thomas Lundbye og P.C. Skovgaard.

He promoted a national art, and in 1847 he established the Nordic Art Society (Selskabet for nordisk Kunst). He gave lectures to a broader public, and on 26 June 1856 he was named as the first professor in art history at the University of Copenhagen.

He helped establish the large painting collection at Frederiksborg Castle, of which much was lost in the fire of 1859.

He was transitional director for the painting collection at Christiansborg Palace.

Høyen also gave lectures as part of a series from the Danish Church Historical Society, which starting in 1852 held meetings around the country in prominent churches, first off the country's cathedrals. His lectures were usually given on the subject of the church itself where the meetings were held, thus bringing into immediate focus the objects and artworks directly at hand. He was a member of the Society's leadership 1861-1870, and helped lead the rebuilding of Viborg Cathedral 1864-1876 before his death in 1870.

== Legacy ==
Høyen played a vital role in Danish nationalistic painting's development around the middle of the 19th century. He advised young artists against going abroad to study art; rather, he insisted, they would be better served to remain in Denmark, undergo training and become independent before allowing themselves to be exposed to foreign influences. Høyen encouraged them to paint native landscapes and Danish monuments to the illustrious past, as well as to paint the people and surroundings of humble agricultural origin where life had not changed so much under industrialization.

His influence on art and artists also had its opposition, such as painter and Academy professor Wilhelm Marstrand who wrote, "Hvad menes der med, at kunsten skal være national? [...] ligesom den samme Sol skinner over hele Verden, saaledes er Kunsten ikke bundet" ("What does it mean that art needs to be national? … In the same way that the same sun shines over the whole earth, so is art not bound (to a specific land).")

Art in Denmark was split into two groups during this period, those oriented towards the Nordic (known as "the blondes") and those internationally oriented towards Europe (known as "the brunettes"). At the higher levels the Nordic trend won, but it meant isolation for Danish art. At the World Exhibition in Paris 1878, a critic wrote that "nok er Danmark repræsenteret ved kunstnere, men ikke med kunst" ("Denmark is well represented with artists, but not with art").

Only parts of his lectures have been preserved in writing, and only a single one has been published. His works were published as a final act by the Nordic Art Society 1871-1876.

His legacy as an art historian and critic was followed up by Julius Lange, who quickly took over Høyen's positions at the Academy and the University shortly after his death.

== See also ==
- Christian Jürgensen Thomsen
