= Jens Schielderup Sneedorff =

Danish writer (1724–1764)

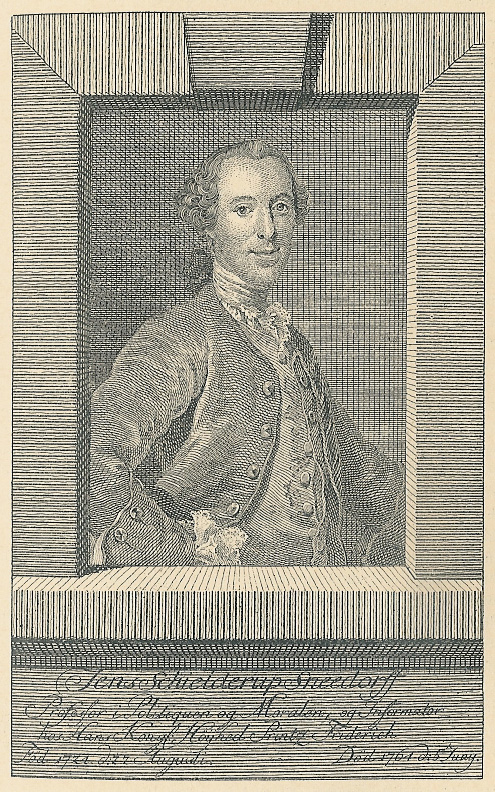
- Jens Schielderup Sneedorff
- Born: 22 August 1724; Sorø, Denmark
- Died: 5 June 1764 (aged 39)
- Occupation: Danish writer

Jens Schielderup Sneedorff (22 August 1724 – 5 June 1764) was a Danish writer, professor of political science and royal teacher and a central figure in Denmark in the Age of Enlightenment.

== Biography ==
Sneedorff was born in Sorø, the son of the last headmaster of Sorø Academy. He studied at University of Copenhagen and University of Göttingen where he was influenced by British and French Enlightenment thinking as well as German cameralism.

From his position as professor at the Sorø Academy for young noblemen and later teacher to the prince, Sneedorff played a key role in formulating the political content of "Enlightenment" in his native Denmark.

== Political views ==
Sneedorff defended absolutism in a model that applied liberal thinking, primarily that of Locke and Montesquieu. A well-functioning polity rested according to Sneedorff on its "police", i.e. a subject and regent mentality of civic virtue, “true honour" and religion.

Civic virtue was associated with patriotism. To Sneedorff it meant industrious conduct and the will and desire to let self-interest yield to the common good.

True honour had the same end, but operated through exploiting people's self-interest by connecting social status to conduct that promoted the common good. In Sneedorff's conception, each of the four estates, nobility, clergy, bourgeoisie, and peasantry had their own honour that resembled four different kinds of patriotic behaviour.

Should all others fail, Sneedorff reserved religion as the last bond of social order.

In general, it was Sneedorff's view that passions like self-interest should not be subdued, but sublimated into forms that are useful to the state. Instilling the right mentality in subjects thus became a vital political undertaking, a task that made the art of government a pedagogic discipline - a project of Enlightenment.

Sneedorff considered the polity he outlined far from the one experienced in his native state of Denmark-Norway. He coined his educational method “the spirit of Socrates”, which implies making people “fall in love” with virtue. Virtue should become a passion itself in order to unite duty-loving subjects and government in emotional harmony.

Sneedorff's absolutist project of enlightenment excluded everyone but the regent from formal political influence. It nevertheless placed enlighteners like Sneedorff himself in a privileged position as those in power to define the contents of virtue and honourable self-management.

His enlightenment attitudes also illustrate the mentality behind the centralising reform policy pursued by the absolutist government of his country.

== Selected writings ==
- Om den borgerlige Regiering (On civil government) (1757)
- Den patriotiske Tilskuer (The Patriotic Spectator) (1761–1763)
