= Hans Harder =

Danish painter and drawing master (1792–1873)

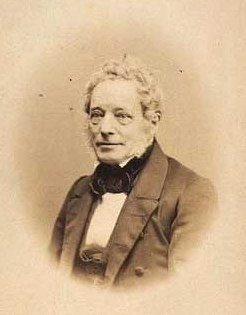
Portrait of Hans Harder

Johannes Georg Smith Harder, known as Hans Harder (12 August 1792 – 25 November 1873) was a Danish painter and drawing master. He was known especially as a painter of landscapes.

== Biography ==
Harder was born in Copenhagen, Denmark. He studied at the Royal Danish Academy of Fine Arts. In 1822, he became a drawing teacher at the Sorø Academy. With funding from the Fonden ad usus publicos, he conducted a study trip to Munich, Italy and Austria during 1825–29. In 1830, he was unanimously elected as a member of the Art Academy. He remained a drawing teacher at Sorø Academy for most of his life, resigning in 1862. He died during 1873 in Sorø.
