= Christen Dalsgaard =

Danish painter (1824–1907)

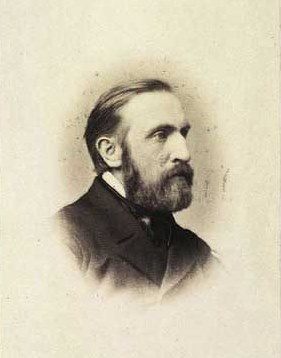
- Christian Albrecht Jensen, The Painter Christen Dalsgaard, 1882
- Born: 30 October 1824; Krabbesholm, Denmark
- Died: 11 February 1907 (aged 82); Sorø, Denmark
- Education: Royal Danish Academy of Fine Arts
- Known for: Painting

Christen Dalsgaard (30 October 1824 – 11 February 1907) was a Danish painter, a late student of Christoffer Wilhelm Eckersberg.

== Biography ==
=== Early life and education ===
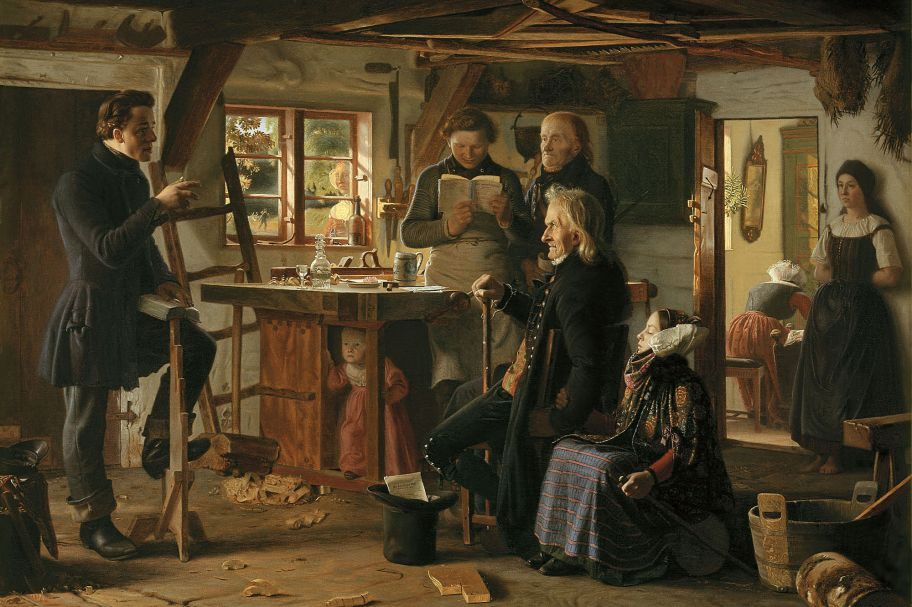
Mormoner på besøg hos en tømrer på landet ('Mormons visit a country carpenter'), 1856

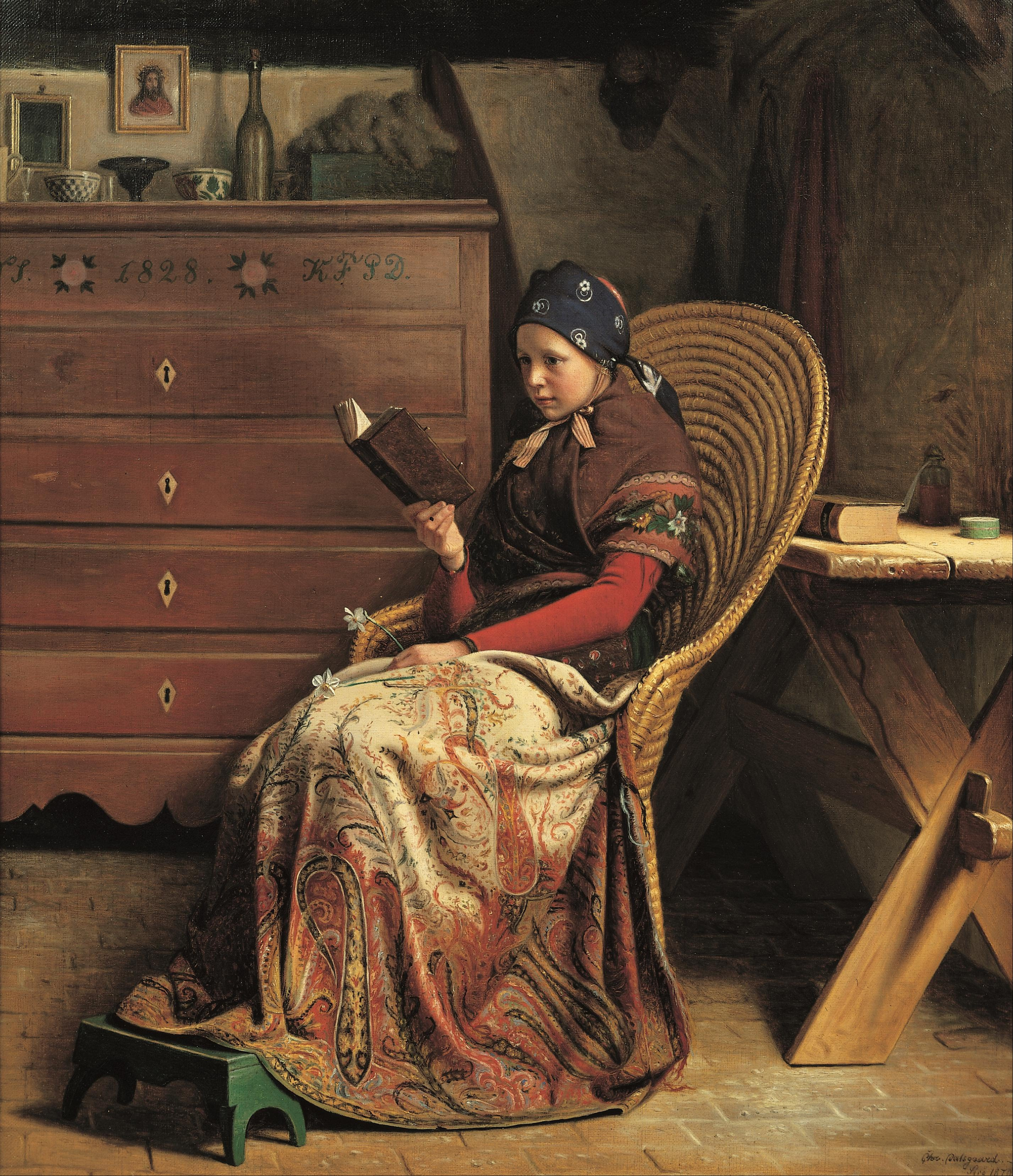
En rekonvalescent ('A convalescent'), 1870, in the Hirschsprung Collection, Copenhagen

Christen Dalsgaard was born on 30 October 1824. He was the son of the owner of the estate, Krabbesholm Manor, located near Skive in Jutland. He showed early signs of artistic talent, and received training as a craft painter. In the spring of 1841 Niels Rademacher, a visiting landscape painter, encouraged the young artist and convinced his parents of their son's talent.

Later that year he traveled to Copenhagen and began his art studies at the Royal Danish Academy of Art (Det Kongelige Danske Kunstakademi) in October 1841. In December 1841 he began private studies with painter Martinus Rørbye. These lessons continued until 1847.

In 1843 he began his studies at the academy freehand drawing school, and the following year at the academy plaster school. Home during the summer and holidays, he busied himself by filling sketchbooks with studies of the local landscape, costumes, and way of life. These formed a lifelong basis for his art. He also began collecting local folk costumes, another lifelong interest.

In 1844 Dalsgaard came under the influence of the art historian Niels Lauritz Høyen, who gave a famous lecture titled "On the conditions for the development of a Scandinavian national art" ("Om betingelserne for en skandinavisk nationalkunsts udvikling"). Høyen called for artists to search for subject matter in the folk life of their country instead of searching for themes in other lands, such as Italy (which was at that time considered a requirement for an artist's training). Dalsgaard was a loyal follower of Høyen's artistic ideals, and forwent the customary journey to Italy, choosing rather to concentrate on themes closer to home.

In March 1846 he began studying at the Academy's model school under professors Christoffer Wilhelm Eckersberg, J. L. Lund and Martinus Rørbye. He had his exhibition debut at Charlottenborg in 1847 and continued showing there every year with few exceptions.

=== An artistic career flourishes ===
In 1855 he painted his first altarpiece at the church in his hometown of Skive. He went on to paint a number of other altarpieces in the years to come.

He had his big breakthrough in 1856 with the painting Mormoner på besøg hos en tømrer på landet ("Mormons visit a country carpenter"). The painting, created only six years after the missionaries' arrival in Denmark, is set in the shadowed interior of a provincial cottage. A group of people are gathered around a table, listening to a missionary's message. Light filters in through a small window and an open door. It is a study of contemporary daily life, carefully depicting the interior and costumes of the people in detail. The painting was donated to the Danish National Gallery (Statens Museum for Kunst) in 1871.

He married Hansine Marie Hansen on 21 August 1857. The newlyweds purchased a house in Frederiksberg. Their circle of social acquaintances included Constantin Hansen, Niels Lauritz Høyen, Wilhelm Marstrand, P.C. Skovgaard, Vilhelm Kyhn, Godtfred Rump, Frederik Vermehren and Julius Exner.

Dalsgaard received the Academy's Neuhausen's prize (Neuhausens præmie) in both 1859 and 1861. He began teaching drawing at Sorø Academy in 1862. Upon being selected, he became a member of the Academy of Art in 1872. He exhibited at the World Exhibition in Paris for the first time in 1878.

He painted his famous painting "I wonder when he will come home" (Mon han dog ikke skulle komme?) in 1879. This painting is typical of his style. The picture features a young woman standing in an open doorway looking off to one side. One foot is on the door frame, and one foot is on the ground outside. The interior is dark and shadowed. The outside is a sunlit agrarian landscape. The title of the painting refers to her inner dialogue.

In 1890 he finished the first of twenty-one small Bible pictures, a project which he continued to work on for the next ten years. He was named a professor at the Academy of Art in 1892, and quit his position at Sorø Academy.

He died on 11 February 1907 in Sorø.

In 1914 the artist's widow contributed a portion of his collection of folk costumes to the National Museum. She died in Sorø on 3 November of that same year. The National Museum acquired the remainder of the collection in 1921.

== Works ==
Christen Dalsgaard, like his contemporaries Julius Exner and Frederik Vermehren, painted primarily genre paintings, national romantic folk scenes rooted in the grasslands of Jutland. He paid great attention to details – folk costumes, the manners and habits of the people, and architecture and landscape. He was a storyteller. His artistic works, as well as those of his contemporaries, opened the way for more realistic paintings in the late 1800s.

A collection of his work can be found at the Skive Art Museum. Other paintings can be found at the National Museum of Denmark in Copenhagen, among other museums.

Selected pictures

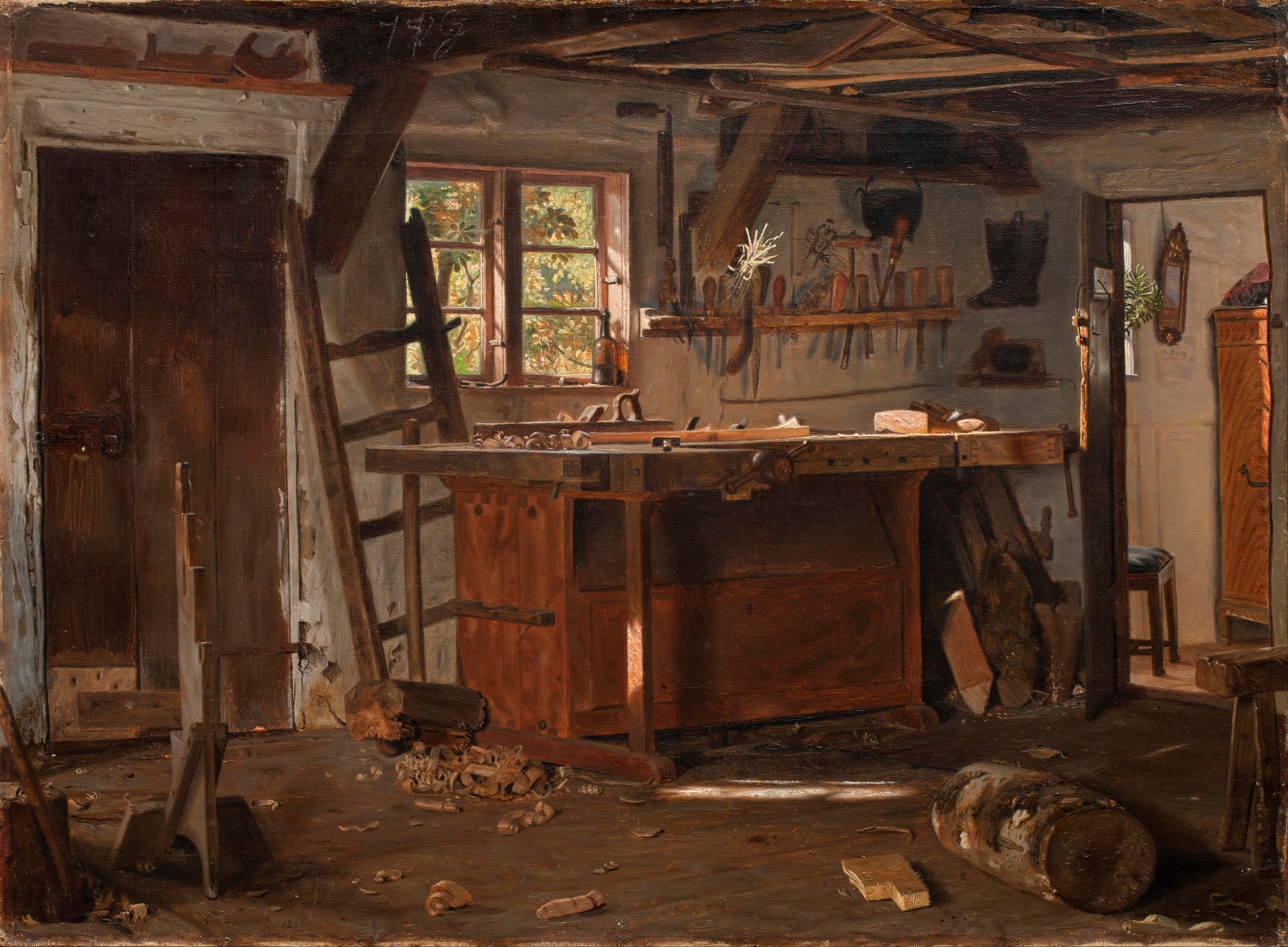
A carpenter's workshop, 1855

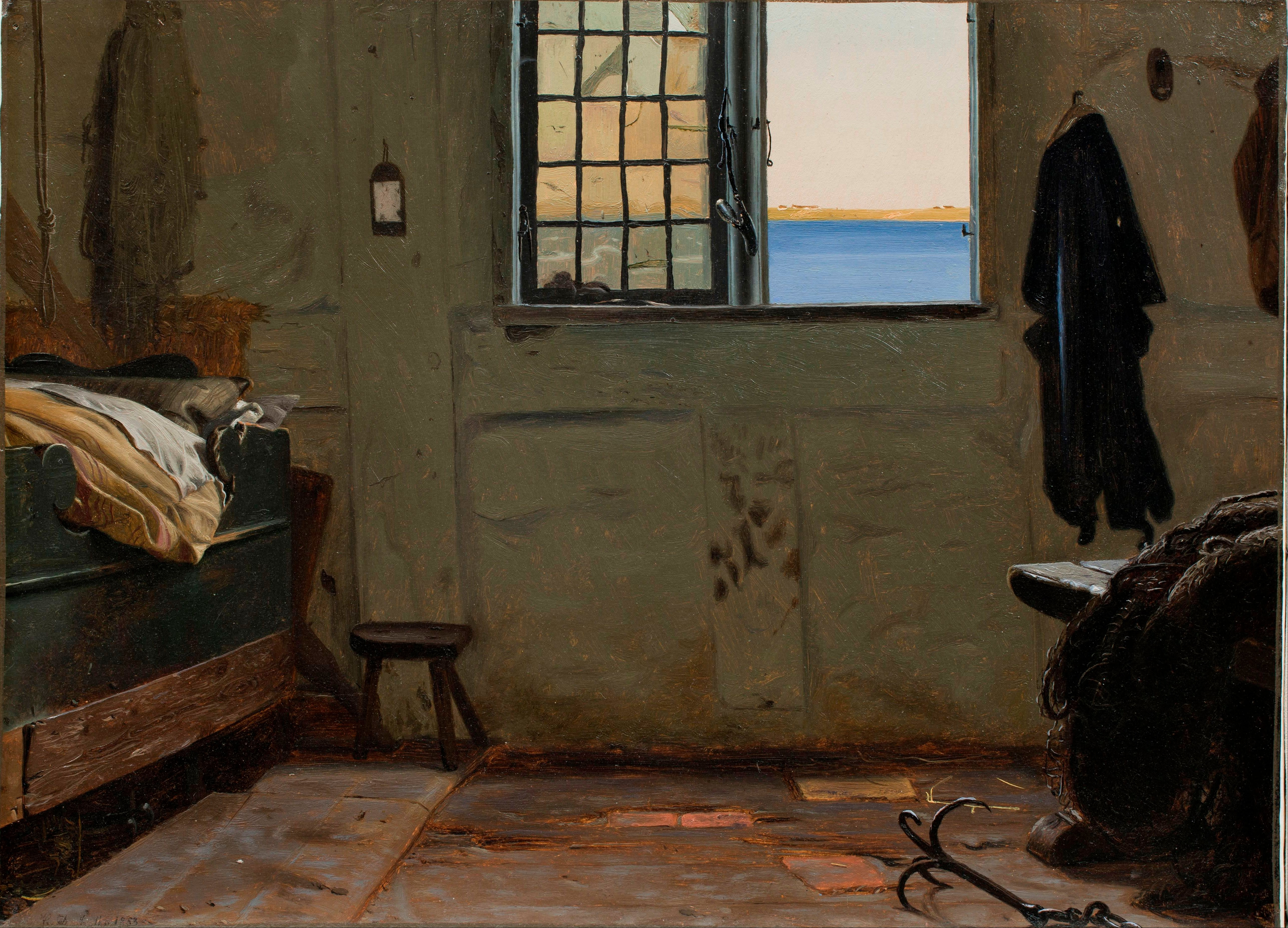
A fisherman's bedroom, 1853

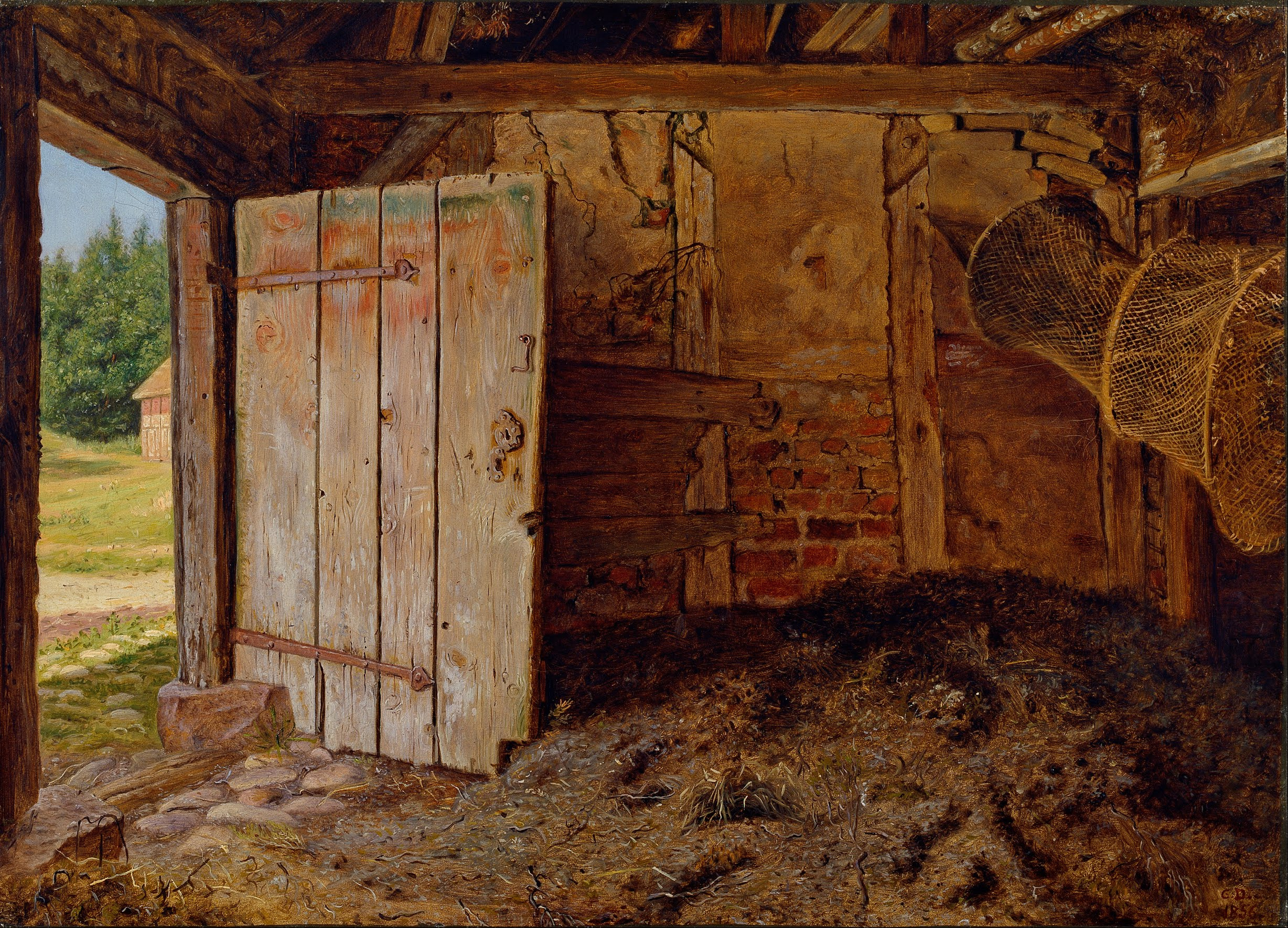
Outhouse interior, 1856

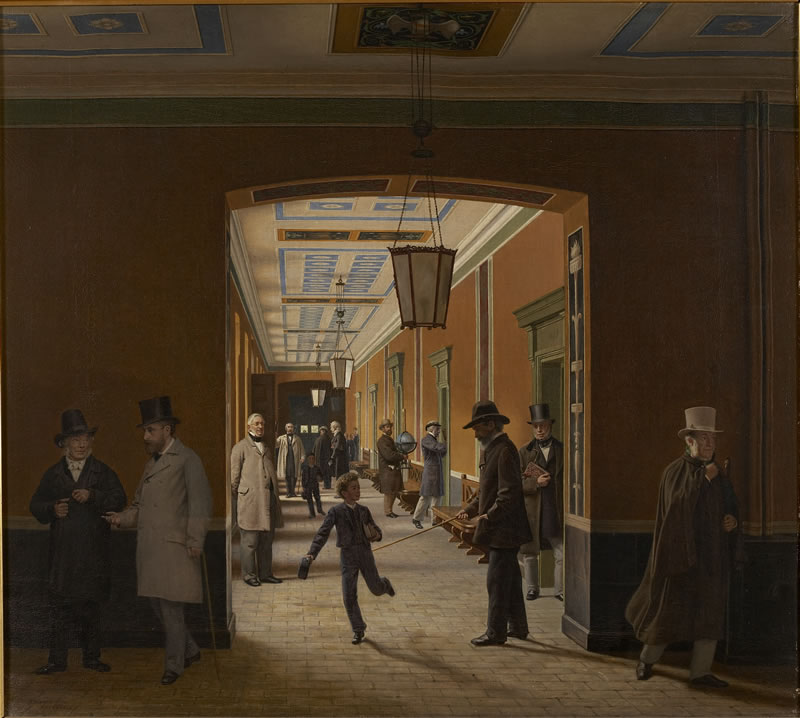
A corridor at Sorø Akademi, 1871

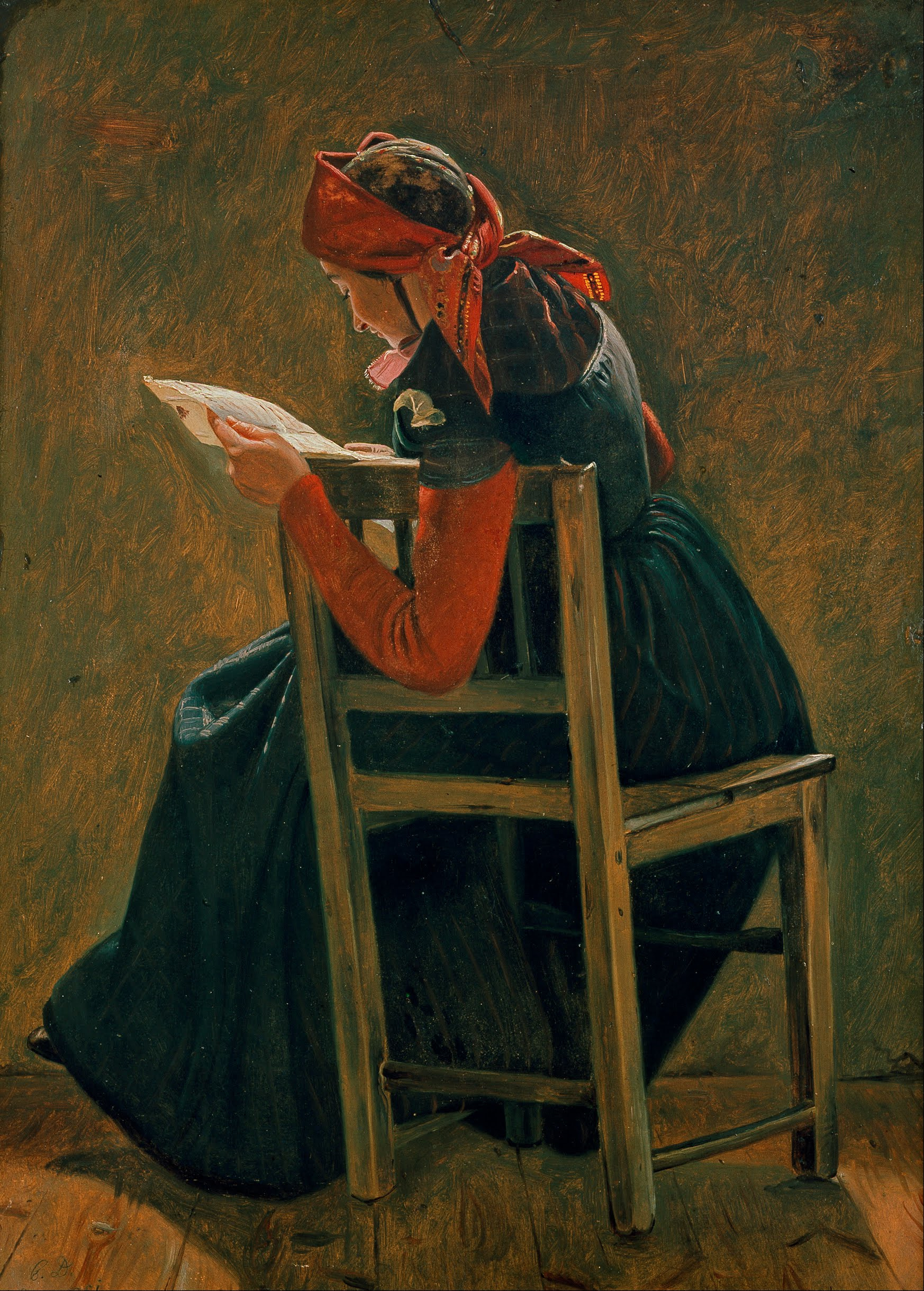
A young girl from Salling reading

== See also ==
- List of Danish painters
