= Sorø Lake =

Lake in Zealand, Denmark

Sorø Sø
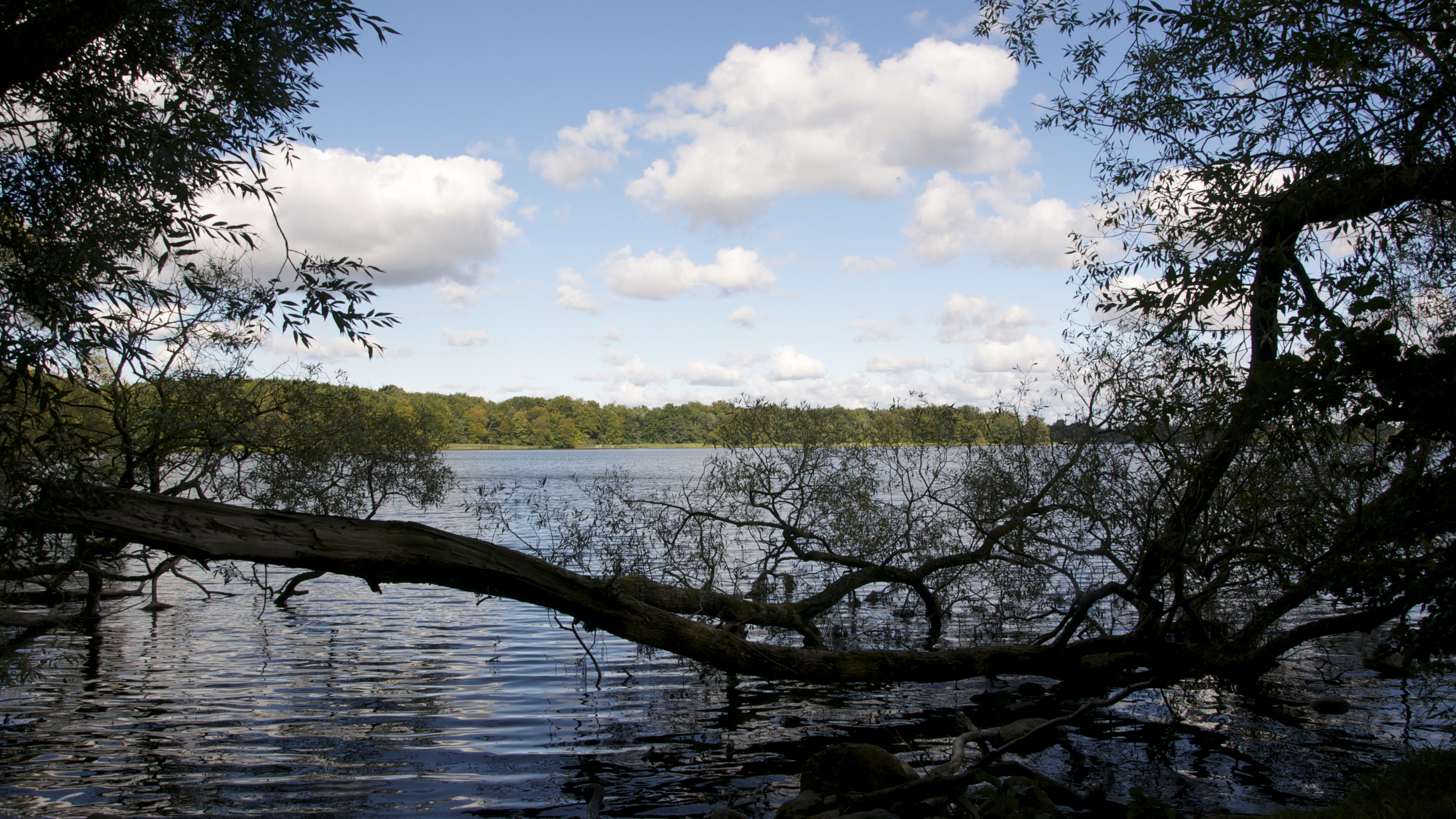
- Sorø Lake

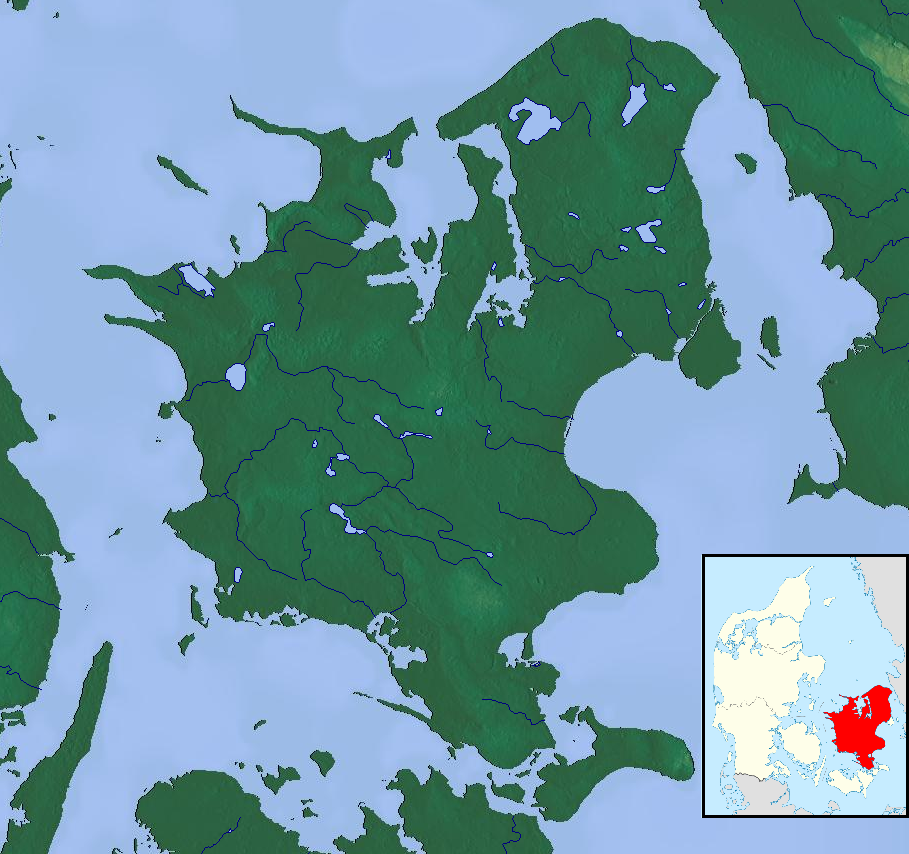
- Location within Zealand
- Location: Zealand
- Coordinates: 55°25′30″N 11°33′00″E
- Type: kettle hole
- Primary inflows: Ørbækken
- Primary outflows: Pedersborg Sø
- Max. length: 2.7 km (1.7 mi)
- Max. width: 1.9 km (1.2 mi)
- Surface area: 17.3 km^{2} (6.7 sq mi)
- Average depth: 5 m (16 ft)
- Max. depth: 12.8 m (42 ft)
- Settlements: Sorø

Sorø Lake is the largest and most upstream of three lakes that almost surround the town of Sorø, Sorø Municipality, on the central part of Zealand, Denmark. Together with the two other lakes, Pedersborg Lake and Tuel Lake, it is collectively known as the Sorø Lakes. They drain into the Suså River. Sorø Lake is owned by Sorø Academy, a centuries-old educational institution that stands on its northeastern shores. A tour boat operates on the lake in the summer time. It is also a popular venue for a wide range of recreational activities, including, sailing, rowing, kayaking, fishing and swimming.

== Geography ==
The lake consists of a rounded southern part and a long, narrow section, Smallesø (Narrow Lake), which extends north and finally becomes a canal that flows into Pedersborg Lake from where water continues to Tuel Lake and then through Tuel Å to the Suså River. It has a total area of 210 hectares and a maximum depth of 12.9 metres. It is a kettle hole and only fed by two minor streams.

== History ==
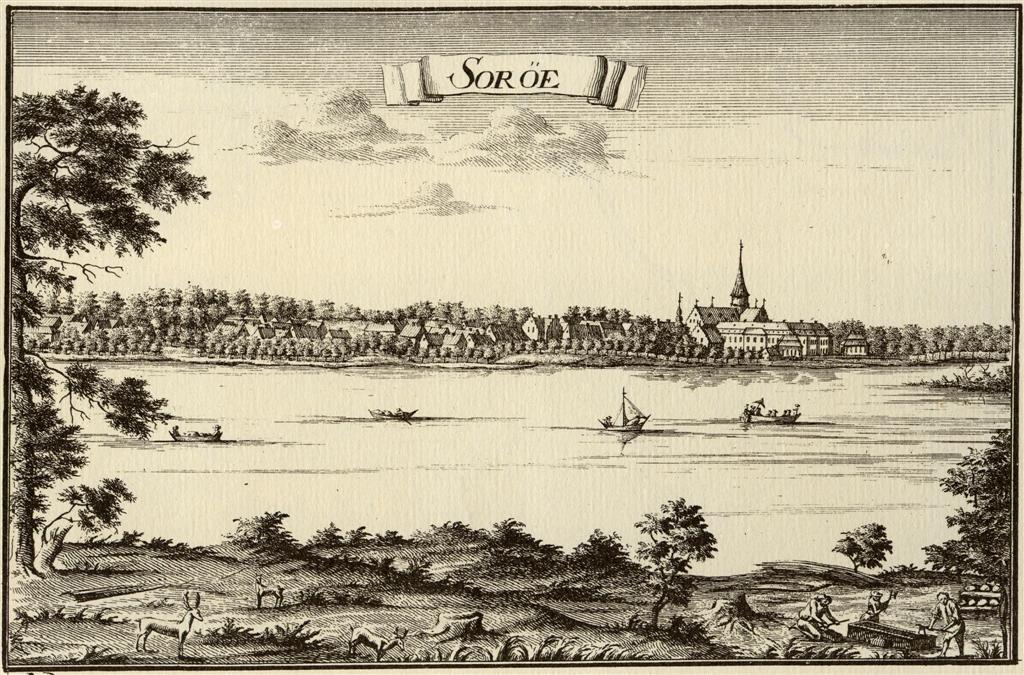
Sorø Lake in the 18th century

Sorø Abbey and the town of Sorø was built on what was almost an island in a single lake. Lake Sorø and Lake Pederborg when an embankment with a new road to Slagelse was built in the beginning of the 19th century. Thuelsø was separated from the two other lakes when the area now known as Flommen was drained and water levels in the lake was lowered.

Sorø Lake was a popular destination for excursions already from the 19th century, especially the Parnas Pavilion on a small hillat the southwestern corner of the lake. It later developed into one of the largest entertainment venues on Zealand with room for 1,200 dining guests and entertainment by artists such as Kai Normann Andersen, Liva Weel and Osvald Helmuth.

A small ferry operated on the lake from 1872, transporting passengers back and forth between the railway station and the town centre or Kongebroen.

== Surroundings ==
=== Town and landmarks ===
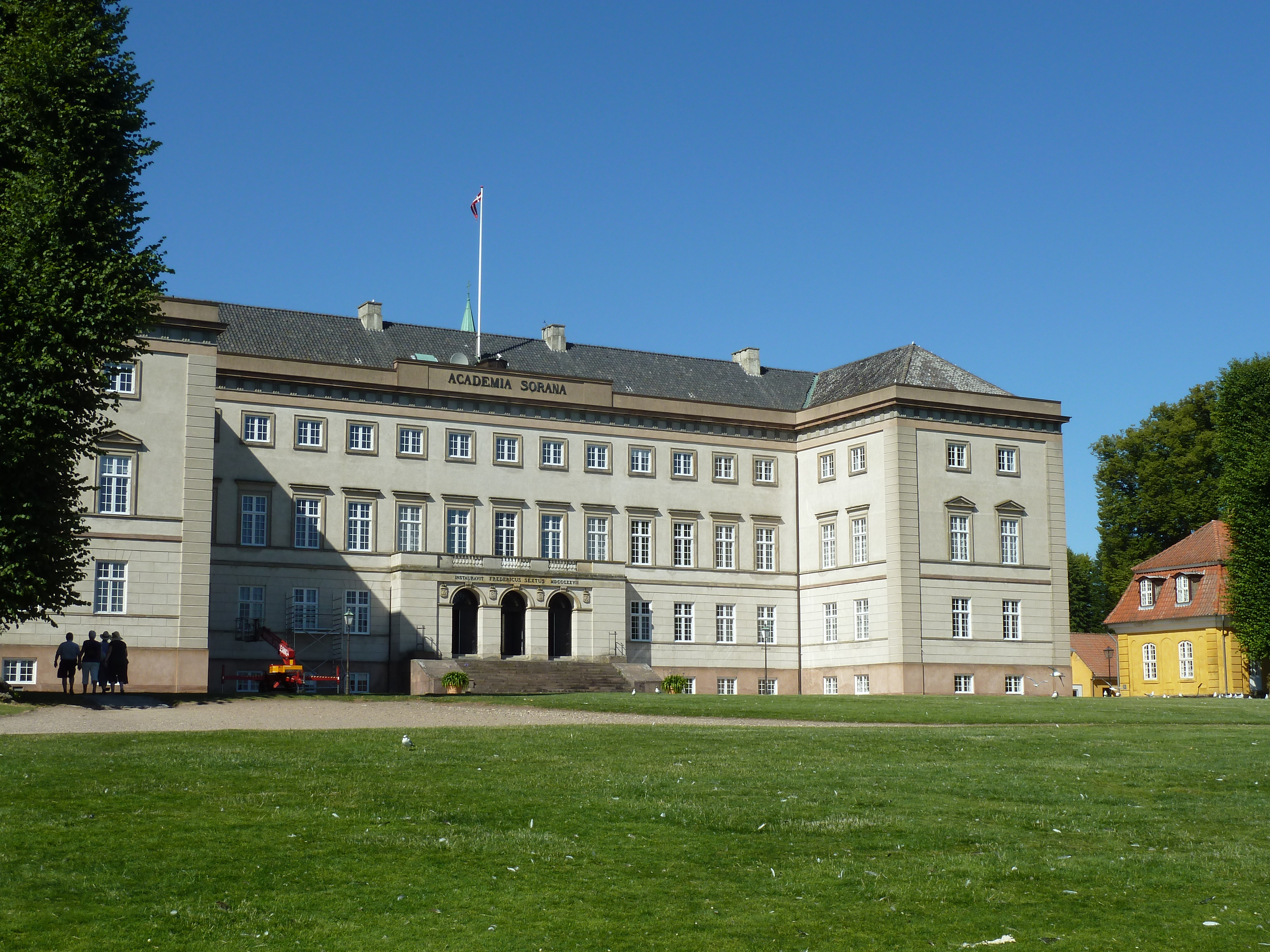
Sorø Academy's main building

The town of Sorø, with Sorø Academy, Is located on the northeastern shores of the lake. The academy's campus area features a number of historic buildings, including Sorø Abbey Church.

Parnas Park opened at the former site of the Parnua pavilion in 2015. Parnas Hus plays host to parties and other events. The park also comprises various outdoor activities.

Feldskovpavillonen is a small thatched building with exposed timber framing. It was built in about 1840 by Etatsråd Povelsen and has been frequented by cultural figures such as B.S. Ingemann and Hans Christian Andersen and many others. Ægir at the northwestern corner of the lake is a former residence for a forest worker where it was also possible to have tea. Støvlet Katrines Hus was originally built for Christian IV's mistress Støvlet Cahtrine. It is now operated as a high-end restaurant.

=== Nature ===
It is surrounded by woodland and green corridors along the shoreline on most of the other sides. Grydebjerg Eood is situated on the west side of the lake. Sønderskov is located to the southeast of the lake, adjoining Flommen on the east side of the lake is grazed by cattle and horses.

== Activities ==
=== Sailing and rowing ===
Sorø Roklub, a rowing lub, is located at the lake.

=== Boat tours ===
The tour boat Lille Claus has been operating on the lake in the summer time since 1997. It has room for 60 passengers.

=== Fishing ===
The lake is particularly known for its carp fishing. The carps in the lake weights up to 15 hg. Other fish in the lake include pike, zander and perch. Local sports fishers are organized in Sorø Lystfisker Forening.

=== Bathing ===
Bathing is mainly done from Skjolden on the east side of the narrow Smallesø section of the lake.
