= Sorø Academy =

Coordinates: 55°25′47″N 11°33′23″E

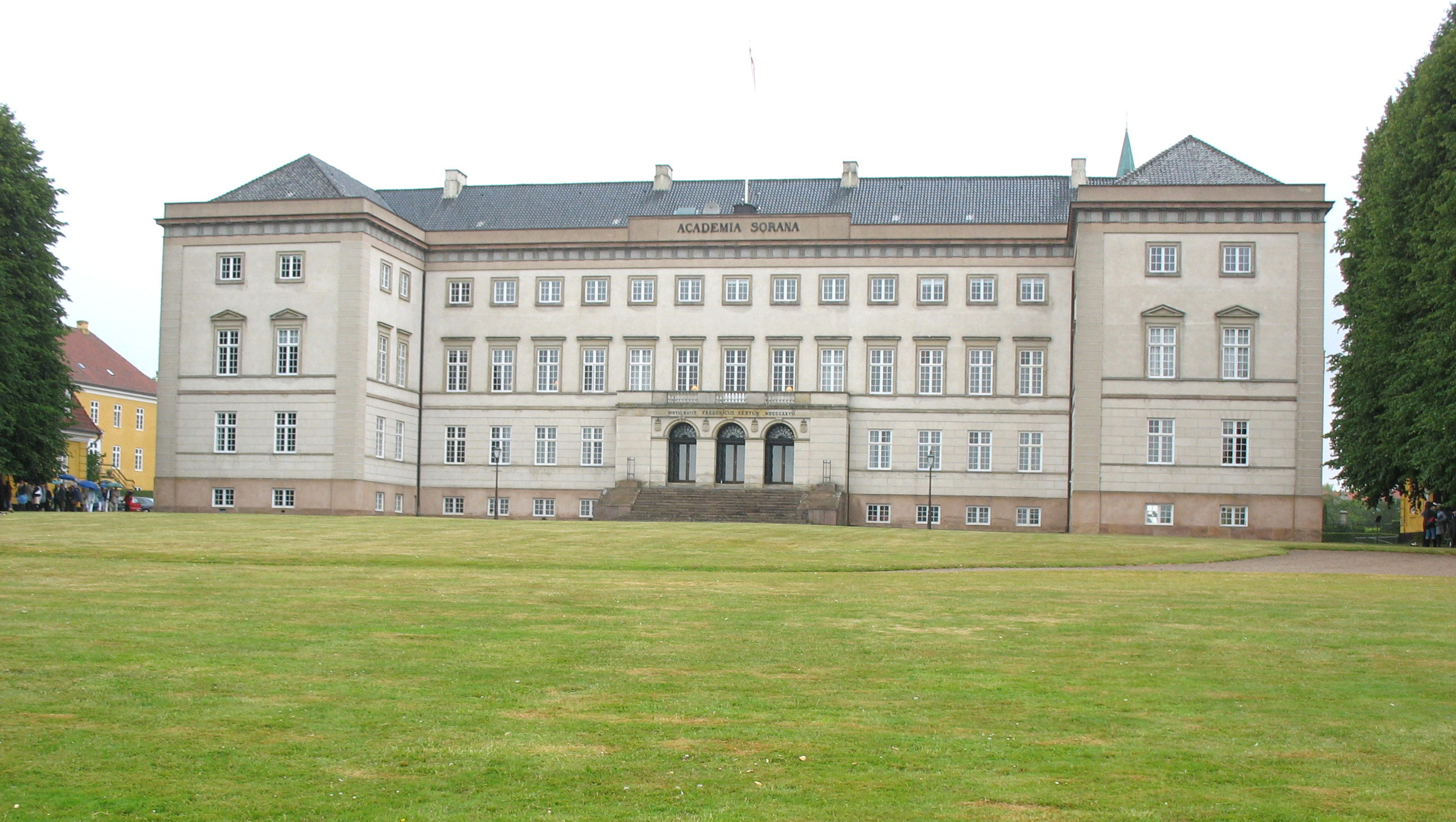
- Sorø, Denmark

Information
- Type: Public gymnasium
- Founded: 1625
- Founder: Christian IV
- Headmaster: Kristian Jacobsen
- Enrollment: 450
- Website: www.soroe-akademi.dk

Sorø Academy (Danish: Sorø Akademi) is a boarding school and gymnasium located in the small town of Sorø, Denmark. It traces its history back to the 12th century when Bishop Absalon founded a monastery at the site, which was confiscated by the Crown after the Reformation, and ever since, on and off, it has served as an educational institution, in a variety of forms, including as a knight academy founded by Christian IV and a venue for higher learning during the Danish Golden Age. Danish-Norwegian writer and academian Ludvig Holberg bequested most of his fortune to re-establishing the academy in 1750 after a devastating fire.

== History ==
=== Christian IV's equestrian academy (1623–1665) ===
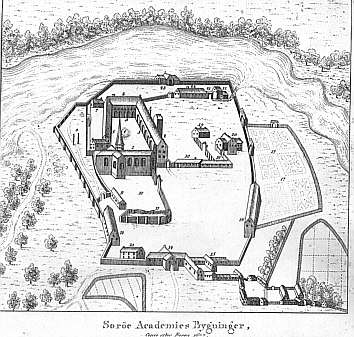
Sorø Academy, Rosens Atlas, 177

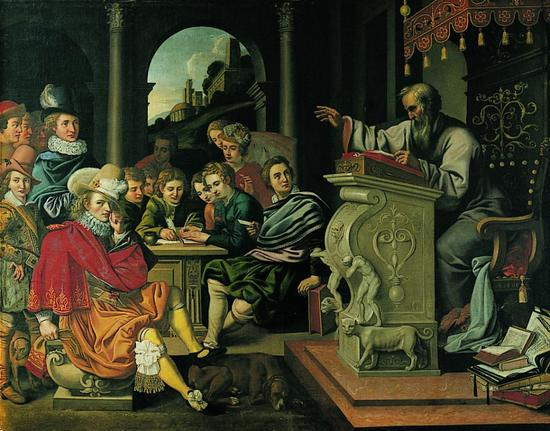
A lecture in an Equestrian Academy, painted by Reinhold Timm, who taught at Sorø from 1623, or Pieter Isaacsz for Rosenborg Castle; part of a series of seven paintings depicting the seven Liberal arts, here rhetoric.

Sorø Academy traces its history back to 1140 when Archbishop Absalon founded the Cistercian Sorø Abbey in a remote woodlands setting on the shores of Lake Sorø on the island of Zealand. It developed into the most prominent and wealthy monastery in Denmark. After the Reformation in 1536, the Crown confiscated the Catholic Church's properties and the former abbey served first as an educational institution for Protestant priests before Frederick II turned it into a boarding school for an equal number of noble and commoner boys.

Sorø Academy was founded in 1623 when Christian IV turned the boarding school into an Equestrian Academy. Later attempts were made to transform it into a university proper but it only existed as such for about 20 years before closing in 1665.

=== Second academy: The Holberg era (1747–1793) ===
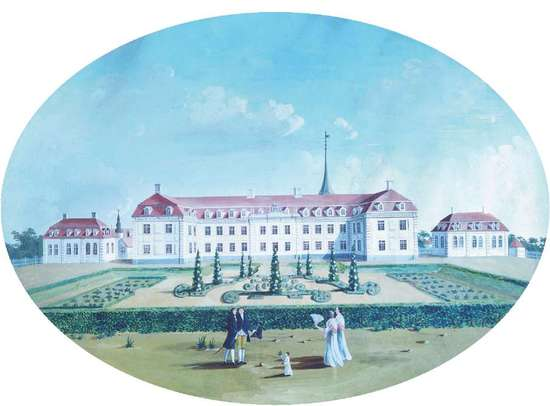
The second Sorø Academy: Lauritz de Thurah's building

After the closure the premises continued as a school until 1737. Efforts were made to reestablish the academy and around 1740, under the reign of Christian VI, the old buildings were rebuilt by Lauritz de Thurah, yet the plans did not materialize until Ludvig Holberg, who had no heirs, was persuaded to bequest his considerable fortune to the institution. The agreement which was ultimately settled upon exempted Holberg from paying taxes from the proceeds of his lands and to reach this end he was ennobled with title of Baron.

Holberg was also consulted on the organization of the academy and the appointment of professors. Jens Schielderup Sneedorff was appointed professor in political sciences on his recommendation in 1751.

=== Golden Age venue ===
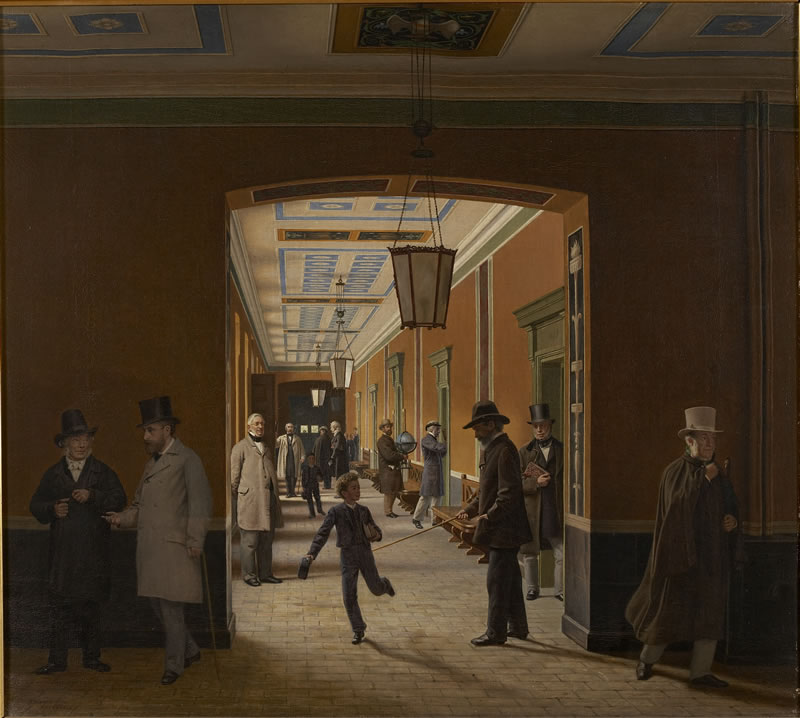
The "Stone Hallway" in 1871, painted by Christen Dalgaard who was a drawing teacher at the academy from 1862 to 1892

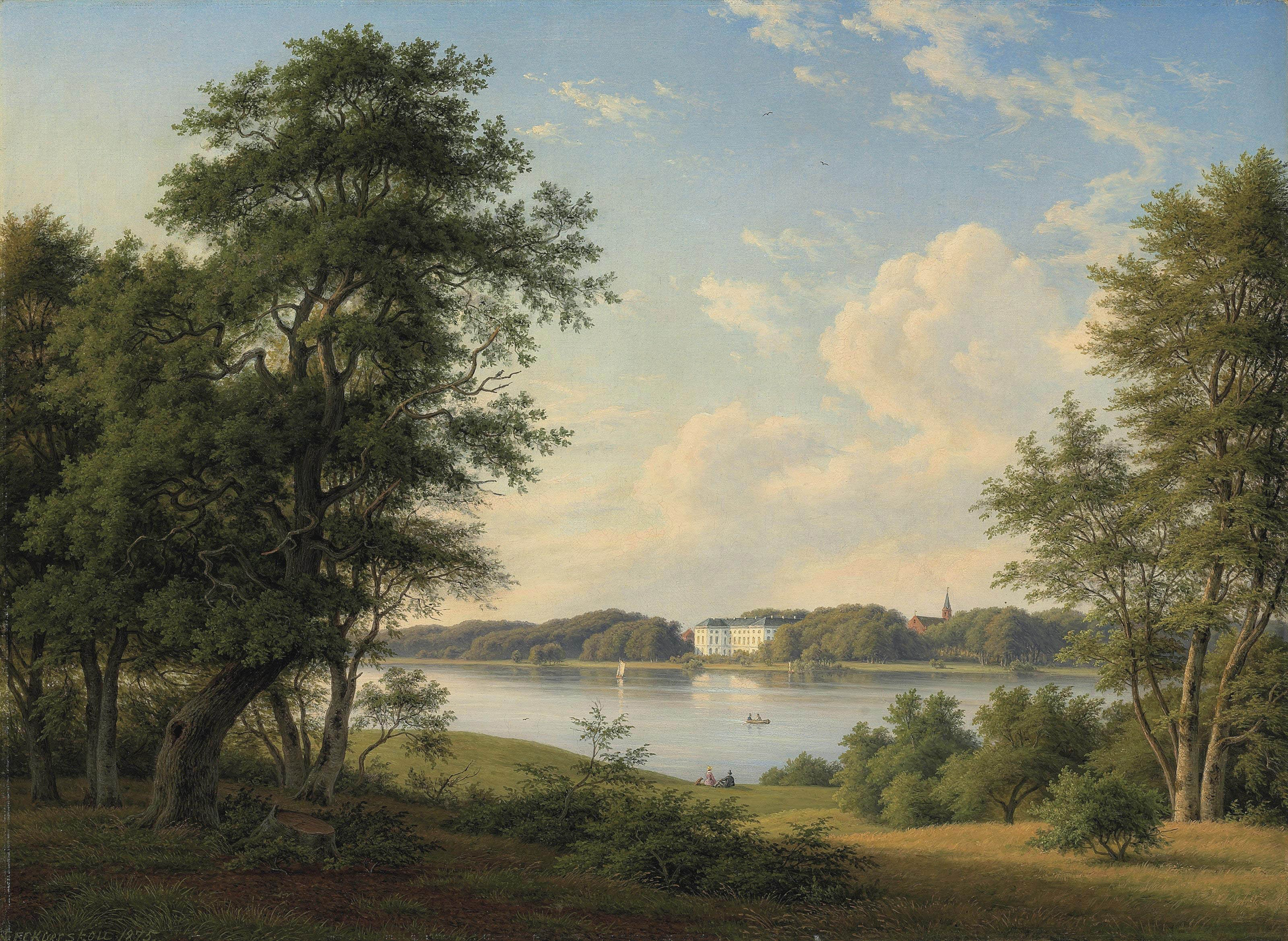
Sorø Academy painted by Frederik Christian Kiærskou in 1875

The main wing burnt down in a fire in 1813 but was rebuilt from 1822 to 1827 to the design of Peder Malling. In 1825, before the rebuilding had been completed, the Sorø Academy reopened once again. Over the next decades it became a central venue of the Danish Golden Age with Bernhard Severin Ingemann as a central figure. Both N. F. S. Grundtvig, Hans Christian Andersen and Bertel Thorvaldsen visited the academy during this period.

== Buildings ==
=== Main wing and gardens ===
The current main wing is designed by Peder Malling in a Neoclassical style which relies more on Greek than Roman architecture for its inspiration. Its interior has decorative works by Georg Hilker.

The academy is surrounded by an English-style park known as the Academy Garden. Located in the park is the Vænget building which contains Adam Wilhelm Hauch's Physical Cabinet, one of the largest collections of scientific instruments in Europe.

=== Chapel ===
The conventual church is an example of Cistercian craftsmanship. It is the third longest church in Denmark, and is one of the first Danish churches built of brick. The Reformation whitewashed the traditional decorations of the church; recently the ancient murals have been uncovered and in part restored. Holberg is buried in the church, as are King Valdemar Atterdag (1340–1375) and his father King Christopher II (1276–1332).

=== Other buildings ===
The gatehouse is the oldest inhabited building in Denmark today. It is where Saxo Grammaticus wrote the famous chronicles 'Gesta Danorum', a medieval historical work recounting the early Christian history of Scandinavia.

Two former professor's residences, today known as Molbech's House and Ingemann's House, survived the fire in 1813 and date from Lauritz de Thurah's rebuilding of the academy in 1740.

The old well, stemming from the original abbey, was in 1915 topped by a well house designed by Martin Nyrop, one of the schools former students.

Other buildings are the Rector's House, the Alumnatet and the Library Building.

== Sorø Academy today ==
=== The school ===
The current school has 630 students, of which 140 are boarders and the rest day students from Sorø, Ringsted and the surrounding countryside.

=== Collections ===
The library has a large collection of old and rare books.

Wilhelm Hauch's physical Physical Cabinet, one of the largest collections of scientific instruments in Europe.

=== Sorø Academy Foundation ===
Sorø Academy Foundation (Stiftelsen Sorø Akademi) owns approximately 6000 hectares of land, mainly covered by forest. The foundation also owns a number of properties in the town of Sorø including Sorø Klosterkirke.

== Notable people ==
=== Former staff ===
- Henrik Ernst (jurist), professor of jurisprudence and moral philosophy
- Reinhold Timm (1623), painter
- Abraham Wuchters (1639), painter
- Johann Elias Schlegel (1748–1749), history, political sciences, trade sciences
- Jens Schielderup Sneedorff (1751), political sciences
- Johann Bernhard Basedow (1753), moral philosophy
- Ove Høegh-Guldberg (1761–1764), statesman, historian, and de facto prime minister
- Johan Theodor Holmskjold (1762–1765), medicine and natural history
- Bernhard Severin Ingemann (1822), Danish literature
- Frederik Johnstrup (1818–1894), mineralogy, natural science
- Christen Dalsgaard (1862–1892), painter
- Aage Blumensaadt (1889–1939), painter

=== Former students ===
- Ulrik of Denmark (1611–1633), administrator of the Prince-Bishopric of Schwerin, military
- Esaias Fleischer (1633–1697), printmaker

=== Students after 1825 ===
- Hinrich Johannes Rink, geologist
- Frederik Vermehren, painter
- Carl Steen Andersen Bille, journalist, politician and civil servant
- Fredrik Bajer (student 1848–54, did not graduate)
- H.R. Hiort-Lorenzen, journalist and writer
- Christian Henrik Arendrup, governor of the Danish West Indies
- Martin Nyrop (attended 1859–1865), architect
- Kristian Zahrtmann, painter
- Hans Egede Budtz, actor
- Herman Bang, writer
- Poul Rasmusen, politician
- Sigurd Langberg, actor
- Ebbe Hamerik, composer
- Hans Kirk, writer
- Jørgen-Frantz Jacobsen, writer
- Aage Kann Rasmussen, engineer
- Ove Arup, structural engineer
- Erik Seidenfaden, journalist
- Gunnar Seidenfaden, diplomat and botanist,
- Mogens Boisen, officer and translator
- Dan Fink, businessman
- Villum Kann Rasmussen, engineer
- Hans Engell, journalist, politician
- Hans Ole Thers, composer
- Christian Karsten Hansen, biotechnology entrepreneur
- Trygvi Samuelsen, lawyer
- Lars Faaborg-Andersen, ambassador
- Eigil Nielsen, paleontologist

Other Danes associated with the academy include 19th-century painters Frederik Vermehren and Christen Dalsgaard, writer Hans Christian Andersen, sculptor Johannes Wiedewelt who created the monument to Holberg in the academy chapel, and geologist Hinrich Johannes Rink.

== See also ==
- Sorø Lake
- Sorø Old Cemetery
- Mørup
