= Julius Exner =

Danish painter (1825–1910)

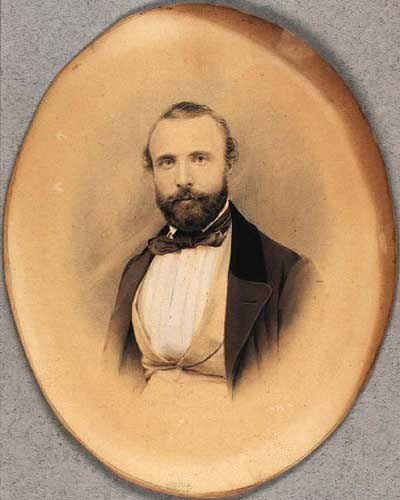
Julius Exner (date unknown)

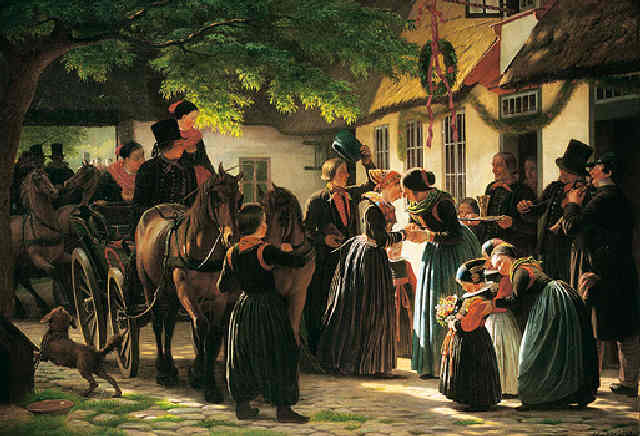
Exner's Et brudepars hjemkomst fra kirken, Amager, 1863

Johan Julius Exner, (30 November 1825 – 15 November 1910), Danish genre painter, was born in Copenhagen to Johann Gottlieb Exner, a Czech musician from Bohemia, who came to Denmark during the Napoleonic period, and his wife Karen Jørgensdatter. Exner originally intended on becoming a history painter, but quickly found his niche, however, in genre painting, the most popular and lucrative painting style of his era. His genre paintings figured prominently in Denmark's National Romantic period, an artistic period directly after the Golden Age of Danish Painting, when artistic focus was turned inwards to uniquely Danish themes.

== Life ==
=== Artistic training and early career ===
The younger Exner was interested in drawing and painting from an early age and was put in private training after his confirmation. He began to study at the Royal Danish Academy of Art (Det Kongelige Danske Kunstakademi) April 1839, where he intended on becoming a history painter. He caught the attention of Professor J. L. Lund, from whom he learned history painting. He studied later on with Christoffer Wilhelm Eckersberg, closely linked to the Golden Age of Danish Painting and commonly referred to as the Father of Danish Painting.

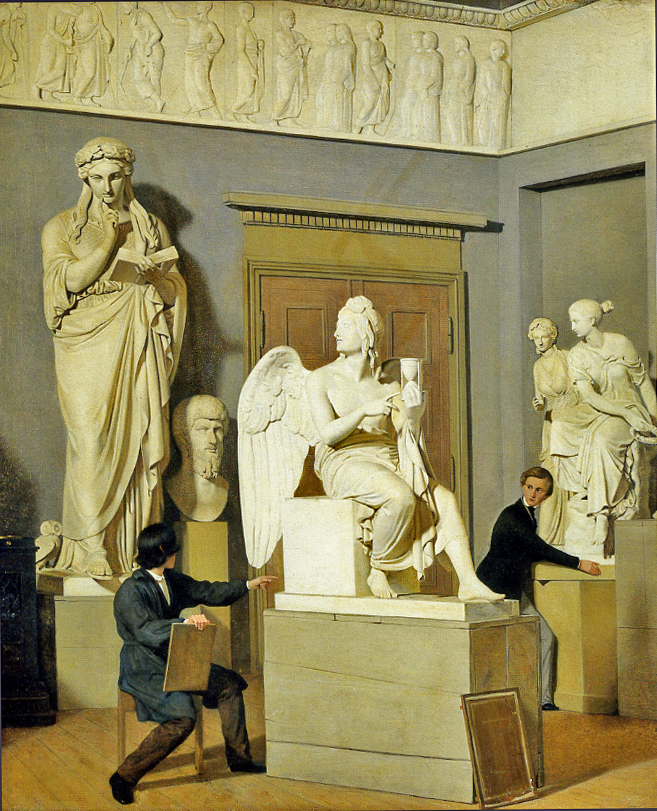
From the Art Academy's Plaster Cast Collection (1843)

In 1844 he exhibited his first painting "Fra Kunstakademiets figursal" ("From the Art Academy's Plaster Cast Collection") painted in 1843; the painting depicts a student sketching a plaster cast of a statue in the Academy's plaster cast collection, another student in the background moves between the figures.

He won the Academy's little silver medallion in 1843, and the large silver medallion in 1845. In these early years he exhibited several history paintings as well a number of portraits. One of these portraits, a portrait of his sister, won him the Academy's Neuhausens prize (Neuhausens præmie) in 1847.

In 1849 one of his history paintings, "Thyra Danebod forsøger at formilde Gorm den Gamles vrede mod nogle fangne kristne" ("Thyra Danebod Tries to Placate Gorm the Elder's Anger with Imprisoned Christians"), was purchased by the Danish Royal Painting Collection, now the Danish National Gallery (Statens Museum for Kunst). Another painting from 1851, "Marsk Stigs Døtre" ("Marsk Stig's Daughters"), was commissioned by Count Frederik Christian Julius Knuth to hang at Knuthenborg Palace. The Count was generous with Exner, not only paying him well but providing him with a studio for several years. Both of these painting depict an ancient Danish history and legend.

=== Painting the folk life on Amager ===
But even Exner admitted to having an irrational "emotional desire to become a history painter" ("usalige lyst til at blive historiemaler"). Niels Lauritz Høyen, critic, Academy professor and advocate of a national art movement, helped influence Exner's future artistic direction, and Exner began seeking out the unique Danish folktypes living in the county as artistic subjects. This brought him to Amager, an island south of Copenhagen, where Dutch farmers had settled in 1521, but who were still relatively unknown to their fellow Danes. There he painted his masterly, life-size "En Amagerkone, der tæller sine Penge efter" ("A Woman from Amager Counting Her Money"), which was exhibited in 1852, and was purchased by the National Collection.

He was not only influenced by the national art movement promoted by Høyen, but also by the strong sense of patriotism during those times after the Napoleonic Wars, and by the general use of particularly "Danish" themes in not only the visual arts, but also in literature and theatre. These themes focused on the folktypes in various areas of Denmark, especially those living in the country and on the farm. In the visual arts a generation of artísts had been already exploring such themes as typical Danish landscapes, and the depiction of Danish and Nordic themes, mythological stories and history. Many of the artists in the preceding generation were students of Eckersberg, and comprised the group of artists collectively known as the Golden Age of Danish Painting artists. They had been affected by Eckersberg's stress on attentive study and representation of Danish nature, as well as by the technical skills he taught them to achieve those goals.

A follow-up painting to his first Amager painting was "Et Besøg hos Bedstefaderen" ("A Visit to Grandfather's House") painted in 1853, which assured him a successful career with its wide popularity and many reproductions. He won a Thorvaldsens exhibition medallion for the work, and the painting was purchased for the National Collection.

He painted a number of painting on Amager over a period of years, and his skills grew as he depicted a combination of artistic challenges: increasingly complicated groups of people, a view out to the open land, colorful folk costumes, and the interiors of old farmer homes. These paintings attracted an interested public, who was fascinated by this close-up look at the exotic foreigners living in Denmark side by side with them. It was a chance to come into the home of strangers and see their everyday life. Exner was skilled and portrayed his subjects with affection, interest and gentle humour.

He often traveled to the countryside during the summers to do live studies from nature, as was common practice in these times, working up finished paintings in the studio during the winter. And he also began seeking out themes in other locations on Sjælland.as well, which resulted in "Et Bondegilde i Hedeboegnen" ("A Party on the Farm in the Hedebo Area") painted in 1856, as well as others of the same ilk. One of his paintings "Lille pige lader en gammel mand lugte til en blomst" ("A Little Girl Lets an Old Man Smell a Flower") painted in 1856, proved to be the start of Heinrich Hirschsprung's collection (the museum now known as the Hirschsprung Collection in Copenhagen), when he purchased it in 1866.

=== Travels ===
He received a two-year travel stipend from the Academy (1857–1858) for a student travel to Italy, which took him also to Dresden, Vienna, Switzerland and Paris, in addition to the Italian cities of Venice, Parma, Florence, Naples and Rome. He occasionally painted depictions of Italy, including his well-known "En gondol" ("A Gondola") from 1859, a view looking out from the dark interior of a covered gondola. A young woman at the left-hand side of the canvas peers out from the dark; a gondolier on the right-hand side of the central archway leans in towards the center of the painting, bathed in light. Beyond is a glimpse of the waterway and other boats.

He illustrated poet Christian Winther's "Billeder og Vers" ("Pictures and Verses") in 1862. He married Inger Henriette Sophie Jensine Ringsted on 15 June 1863.

He traveled to Sweden several times between 1863 and 1864, and on his travels in Denmark he reached Jutland's northernmost point-- Skagen—in 1867, the fishing village that, a generation later, would play host to the group of artists known as the Skagen Painters.

=== A member of the Academy ===
In 1864 he became a member of the Academy in Denmark, and in 1866 the Academy in Stockholm, Sweden. He painted another famous painting of Amager folk, the cheerful "Blindebuk" ("Blind Man's Bluff") depicting a farmhouse interior with children at play, in 1866. In an age where industrialisation was fast encroaching on traditional farmlife, Exner depicted a timeless vision of several generations of farm folk, gathered around in their idealised and cheerful house, self-sufficient and happy. A later generation of artists would rebel against this idealisation with their realistic depictions of want and need among the same types of people.

He also painted portraits of the day's prosperous and prominent, such as Jenny Adler, wife of businessman, banker and politician David Baruch Adler, with her daughters in 1868, and the elderly poet "Christian Winther paa Spaseretur" ("Christian Winther on a Walking Tour") in 1869.

He was named Professor at the Danish Academy in 1876 after having been an assistant professor in the School of Model Painting since 1872.

=== His later years ===
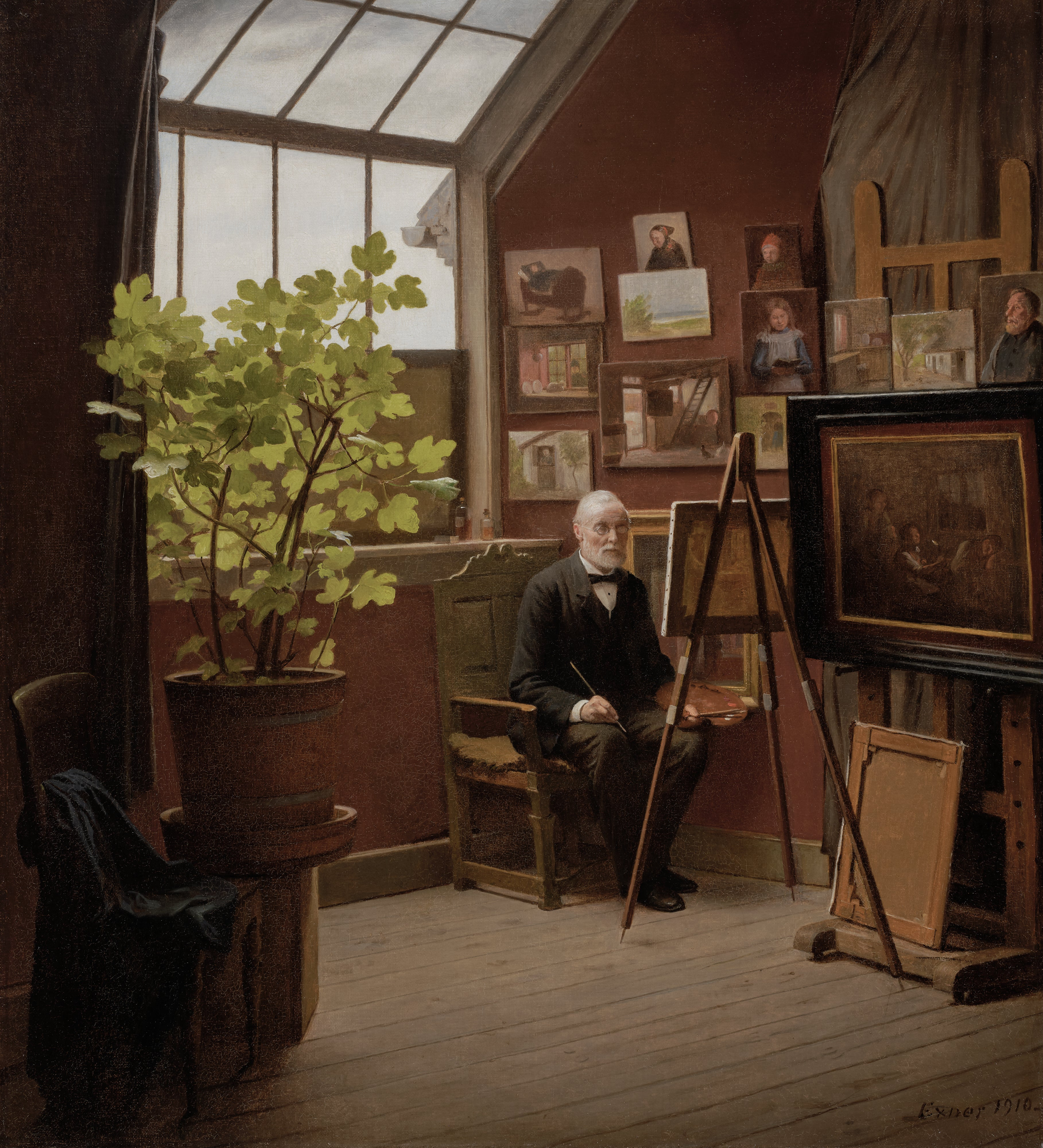
Julius Exner, Self-Portrait, the Artist’s Last Work, 1910, Loeb Danish Art Collection

Starting in the late 1870s Exner began painting themes from Fanø, a Danish island in the North Sea off the west coast of Jutland, the Danish mainland. He came to the island for the first time in 1877. He and his family spent the summers there annually for many years to come. He had a studio at Sønderho Kro. There he found a group of people whose lives interested him deeply, a folk who were fast becoming extinguished in the social changes of that time. These themes made excellent subjects for his painting until his death.

His work was exhibited at the world exhibition in Paris in 1878.

He received a Treschow award in 1887. He became a member of the Exhibition Committee at Charlottenborg in 1879, and was named head of the committee in 1890. He served in this capacity five years. He was a member of the School Council (Skolerådet) between 1883 and 1905, was Treasurer from 1884, and member of the Academy Council (Akademirådet) from 1887.

He painted several self-portraits in his final years, one in 1906 and one in 1910. He died on 15 November 1910 in Copenhagen two weeks shy of his 85th birthday. He is buried in Holmen's Cemetery in central Copenhagen.

He exhibited at the Charlottenborg Spring Exhibition annually from 1844 until his death in 1910, with few exceptions.

== Works ==
His works were exhibited at the Nordic Art Exhibition in Copenhagen (1872, 1883, 1888) and in Gothenburg, Sweden in 1881, at the first International Art Exhibition in Vienna, Austria in 1882 and at the International Art Exhibition in Berlin in 1891.

His work has been shown posthumously both in Denmark and internationally in numerous exhibitions of Danish art, including an exhibition in Paris in 1928.

His works are in the collection of many Danish museums including the National Art Museum (Statens Museum for Kunst), the Hirschsprung Collection, and local art museums in Aarhus, Randers, Ribe, Amager, northern Jutland, Frederiksborg CountyFrederiksborg and Funen.

Exner was a master of composition setting up a lively combination of characters, costumes, and interiors, along with an underlying anecdote, that showed an inspiration of Dutch and German paintings. He was interested in the people he portrayed. He idealised their lives, and his work led to the rebellion known as realism.

Other Danish genre painters of his generation were Christen Dalsgaard and Frederik Vermehren. They all depicted Danish country folk.

== See also ==
- List of Danish painters

== Gallery ==
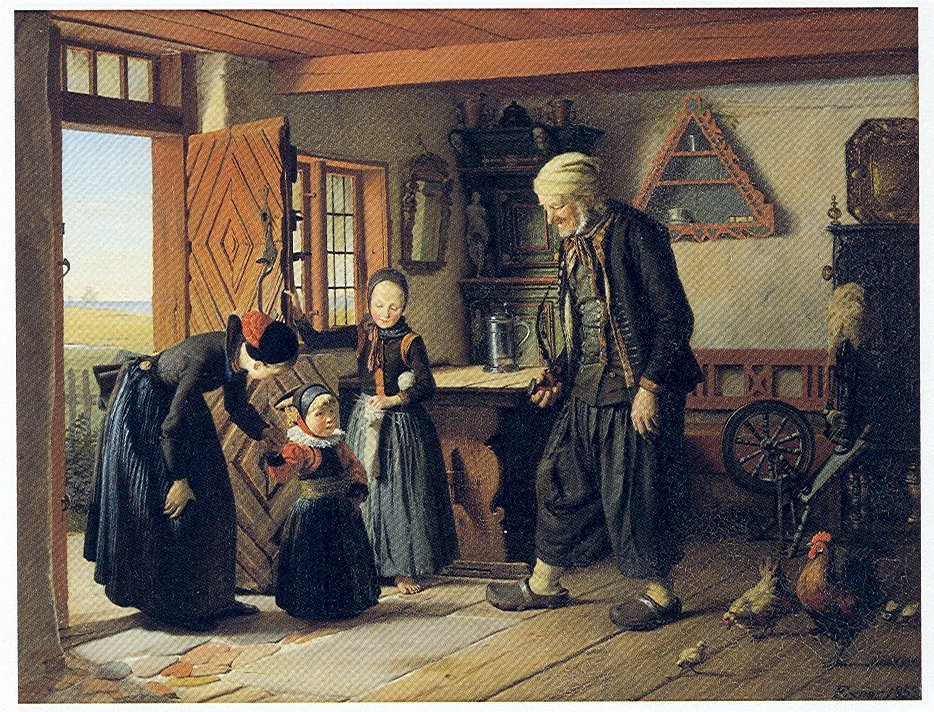
Besøget hos Bestefader (1853)

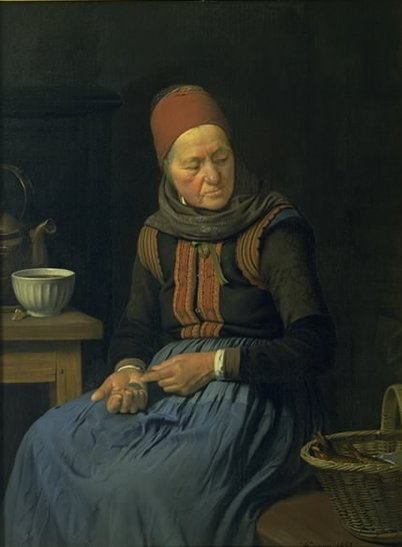
En Amagerkone (1852)

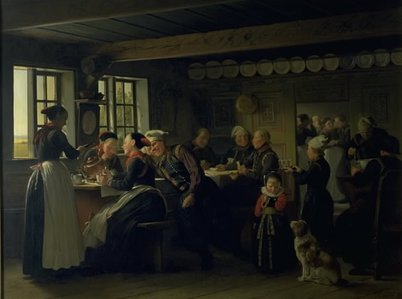
Episode af et gilde paa Amager (1854)

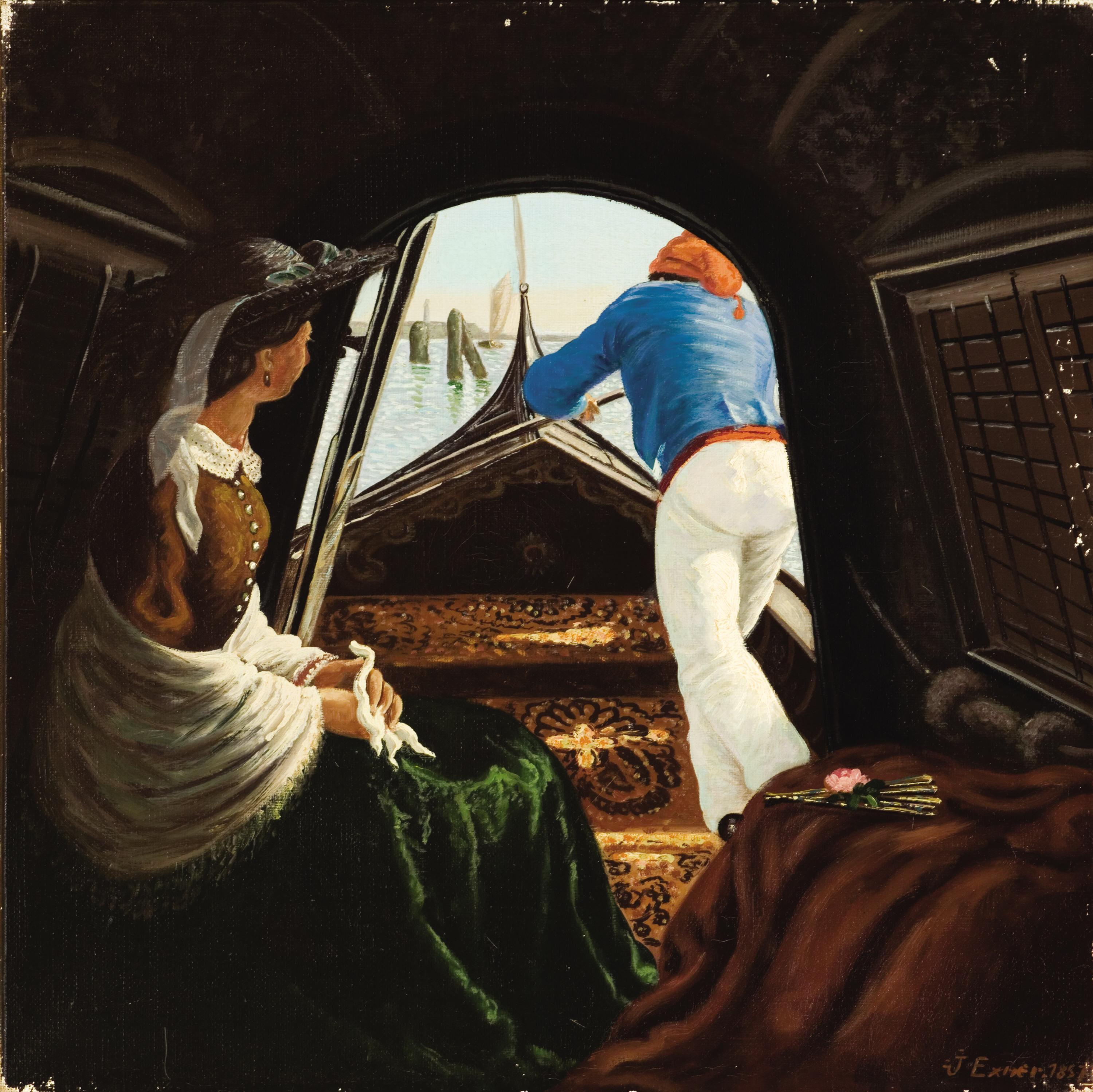
En Gondol (1859)

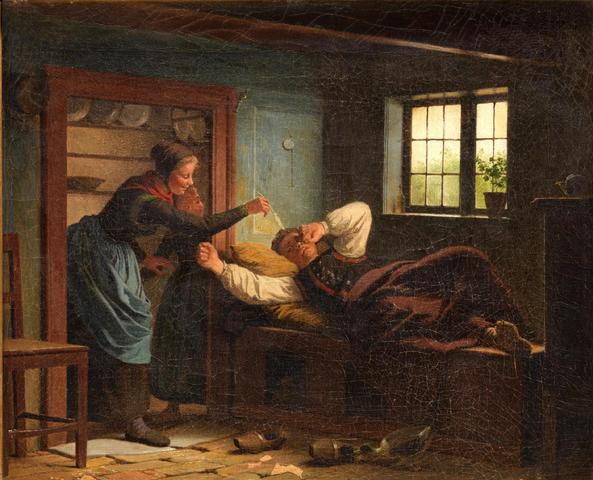
Den Forstyrrede Middagshville
