= Sorø Pharmacy =

Historic building in Sorø, Denmark

Coordinates: 55°26′01″N 11°33′24″E

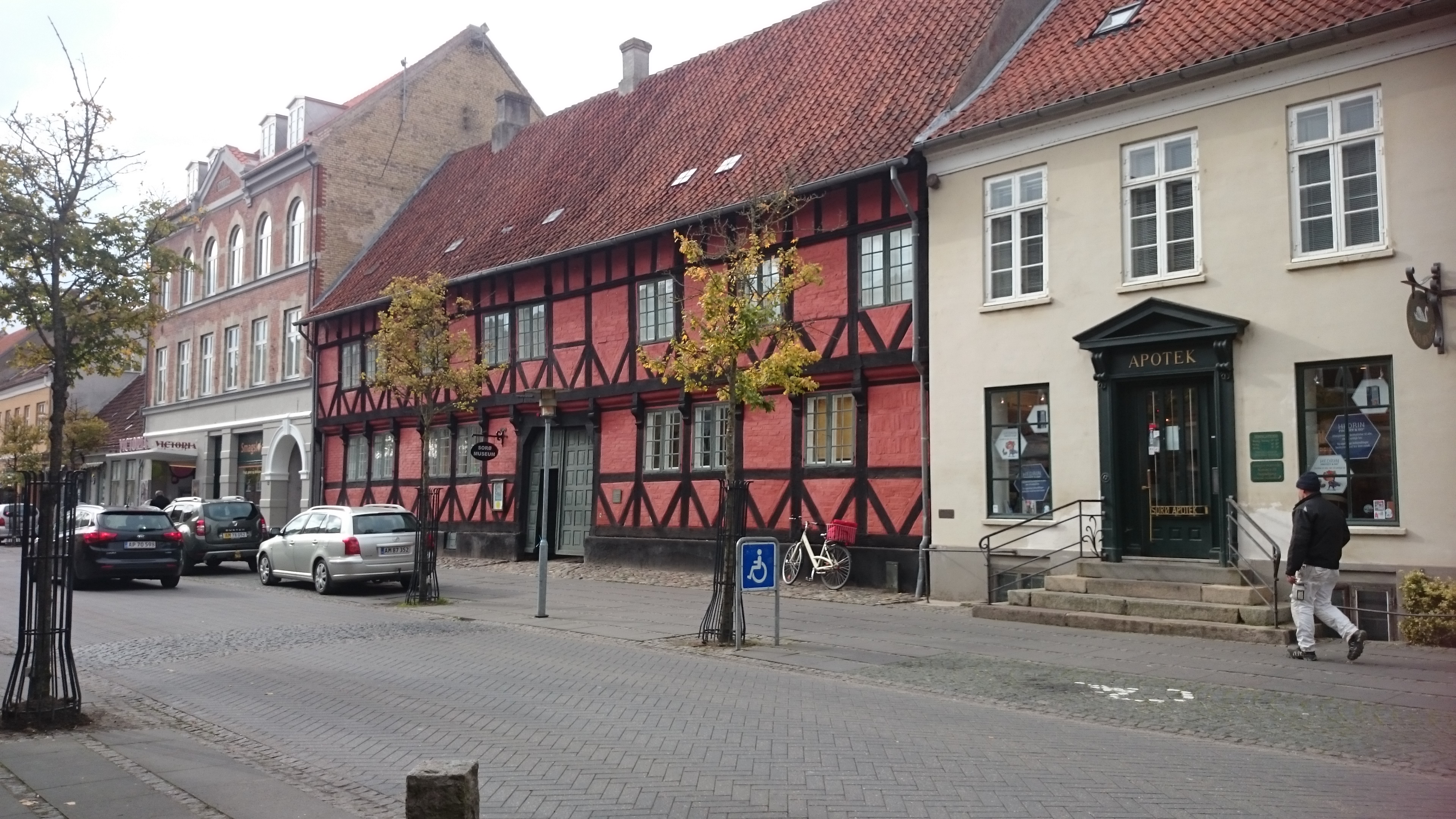
Part of Sorø Pharmacy visible to the right of Sorø Museum.

Sorø Pharmacy (Danish: Sorø Apotek) is located on Storgade in Sorø, Denmark. The current buildings date from the 1840s and were listed on the Danish registry of protected buildings and places in 1949.

== History ==
=== 17th century ===
Sorø Pharmacy was established on 20 March 1606 by Anders Christensen (1551–1606); but he died in November that same year, and a royal license was subsequently not issued to a new pharmacist.

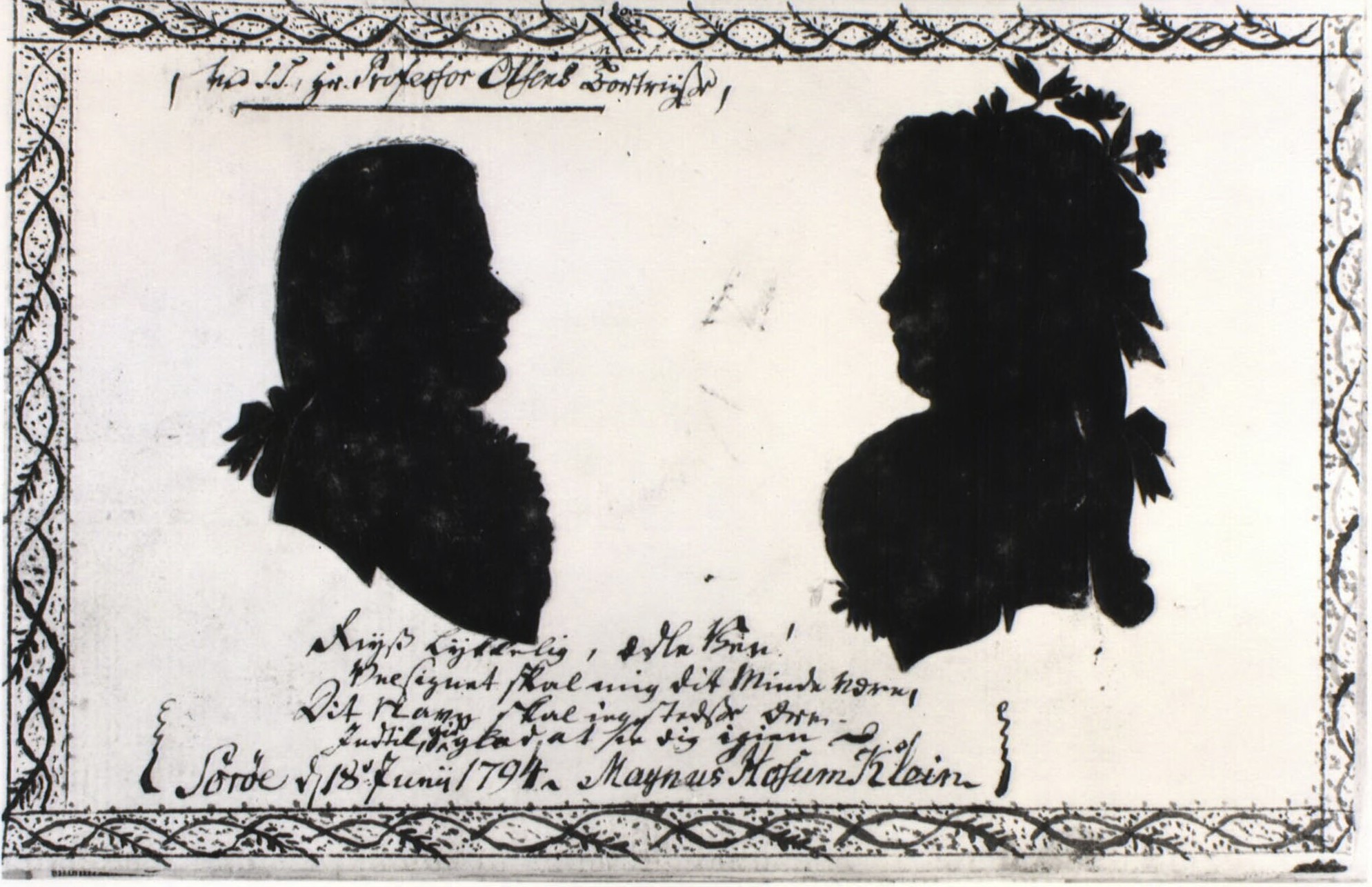
Magnus Hosum Klein

Joachim Burser, who was a professor at Sorø Academy, reopened the pharmacy in January 1631. The pharmacy was continued after Burser's death by his widow, son and grandson. His grandson Johannes Burser chose to close it when he opened the Swan Pharmacy in Slagelse on 30 April 1673.

=== 18th century ===
The pharmacy in Sorø was reopened by Christian Ludvig Martini on 22 March 1748, and he operated it until his death in 1779. He was succeeded by Magnus Hosum Klein (1745–1815), who also served as the town's postmaster.

=== 19th century ===
Søren Christian Ørsted, the father of Hans Christian Ørsted and Anders Sandøe Ørsted, acquired the pharmacy in December 1807. The Ørsted family left Sorø in 1811–12, when Ørsted became a pharmacist in Roskilde.

The new owner of Sorø Pharmacy was Hans Egede Glahn (1783–1874). He ceded it to his son, Heinrich Christopher Glahn (1820–1899), in 1850. The latter sold it to Harald Ulrik Viktor Clausen in 1893.

== Building ==
The pharmacy has been located at the corner of Storgade and Vestergade since the 1780s, but the current building complex dates from the 1840s, when the original half-timbered buildings were rebuilt in brick. It consists of an L-shaped two-storey brick building at the corner, two one-storey side wings and a one-storey rear wing. The buildings surround a central courtyard. The L-shaped main building contained the shop and a residence for the pharmacist. It has large shop windows facing the street. The ceiling of the former dining room was decorated by Christian Dalgaard in the 1890s. The buildings were listed on the Danish registry of protected buildings and places in 1949.
