= Listed buildings in Sorø Municipality =

This is a list of listed buildings in Sorø Municipality, Denmark.

== List ==
=== 4173 Fjenneslev ===
| Listing name | Image | Location | Coordinates | Description |
|---|---|---|---|---|
| Alsted Rectory | | Alstedvej 32, 4173 Fjenneslev | 55°24′16.74″N 11°39′57.17″E | Two-winged house consisting of a main wing from the 17th century and 1850 and an east wing from 1908 |
| Legathuset | | Alstedvej 30, 4173 Fjenneslev | 55°24′15.94″N 11°39′52.7″E | Half-timbered wing from the 18th century |

=== 4180 Sorø ===
| Listing name | Image | Location | Cpprdonates | Contributing resource |
|---|---|---|---|---|
| De Unge Herrers Gård | | Storgade 7A, 4180 Sorø | 1577 | "The Young Gentlemen's House", originally built in 1623-25, the brick frontage on the street constructed around 1750, expanded in 1898 and altered in 1955. |
| Lynge Rectory | | Lyngevej 8, 4180 Sorø | 1742 | A 44 bays long, jalf-timbered house built in 1742 and altered in c. 1850. |
| Priorgade 3A | | Priorgade 3A, 4180 Sorø | 1856 | Late Neoclassical townhouse in two storeys under a red tile roof from 1857. |
| Regensen | | Torvet 7, 4180 Sorø | 1750 | Former dormitory for students at Sorø Academy. The two-storey, 18th-century main wing fronting the square. |
| Regensen | | Søgade 1B, 4180 Sorø | 1822 | A 24-bay, single-storey half-timbered rear wing from 1822. |
| Regensen | | Torvet 7, 4180 Sorø | 1822 | A 20-bay, single-storey, half-timbered rear wing. |
| Scavenius' Stiftelse | | Torvet 8, 4180 Sorø | 1700 | Residential building with exposed timber framing from 1680 and later. |
| Sorø Academy | | Akademigrunden 7, 4180 Sorø | 1827 | Three-winged main building from 1822-27 designed by Peder Malling. |
| Sorø Academy: Abbey Gate | | Akademigrunden 1, 4180 Sorø | 1200 | |
| Ingemann House | | Akademigrunden 8, 4180 Sorø | 1743 | |
| Molbech House | | Akademigrunden 9, 4180 Sorø | | |
| Sorø Academy: Rectory | | Akademigrunden 10, 4180 Sorø | | |
| Sorø Art Museum | | Storgade 9, 4180 Sorø | | |
| Sorø Museum | | Storgade 17, 4180 Sorø | | |
| Sorø Museum | | Storgade 17, 4180 Sorø | | |
| Sorø Old Town Hall | | Torvet 2, 4180 Sorø | | |
| Sorø Pharmacy | | Storgade 19A, 4180 Sorø | 55°26′0.31″N 11°33′23.63″E | Four-winged building complex from c. 1845 containing the local pharmacy |
| Sorø station | | Stationspladsen 2A, 4180 Sorø | | |
| Sorø station | | Stationspladsen 2A, 4180 Sorø | | Water tower. |
| Søgade 1 | | Søgade 1A, 4180 Sorø | | |
| Søgade 3 | | Søgade 3, 4180 Sorø | | |
| Søgade 3 | | Søgade 3, 4180 Sorø | | De unge |
| Søgade 6 A-B | | Søgade 6A, 4180 Sorø | | |
| Søgade 6 A-B | | Søgade 6B, 4180 Sorø | | |
| Søgade 7A | | Søgade 7A, 4180 Sorø | | |
| Søgade 10A | | Søgade 10A, 4180 Sorø | | |
| Torvet 3 | | Torvet 3, 4180 Sorø | | |
| Torvet 5 | | Torvet 5, 4180 Sorø | | |
| Urnes Gård | | Søgade 9, 4180 Sorø | | |

=== 4291 Ruds Vedby ===
| Listing name | Image | Location | Coordinates | Description |
|---|---|---|---|---|
| Vedbygård | | Hovsøvej 5, 4291 Ruds Vedby | 55°32′38″N 11°22′29.8″E | |
| Vedbygård | | Hovsøvej 4, 4291 Ruds Vedby | 55°32′38″N 11°22′29.8″E | |
| Vedbygård | | Hovsøvej 5, 4291 Ruds Vedby | 55°32′38″N 11°22′29.8″E | |
| Vedbygård | | Hovsøvej 5, 4291 Ruds Vedby | 55°32′38″N 11°22′29.8″E | |

=== 4293 Dianalund ===
| Listing name | Image | Location | Coordinates | Description |
|---|---|---|---|---|
| Tersløsegaard | | Holbergsvej 101A, 4293 Dianalund | 55°30′39.4″N 11°29′25.92″E | |
