= Joachim Burser =

Joachim Burser (1583 - 28 August 1639) was a German-Danish botanist, physician and pharmacist. He was professor of medicine and physics at Soro Academy from 1625 and owned Sorø Pharmacy from its reopening in 1639.

== Biography ==
Burser was born in Camentz, Lausitz. He studied medicine and botany at several universities, including Basel where he studied under Caspar Bauhin. He then practiced as a physician in Annaberg, Saxony.

He moved to Denmark in 1625 when he was offered a position as professor in medicine and botany at the new Sorø Academy. In January 1639 he was also awarded a royal license to open a pharmacy in Sorø.

== Legacy ==
Burser is mainly remembered for his contributions as a botanist. He left a herbarium in 25 volumes. Corfitz Ulfeldt brought it with him to Sweden where it is now kept in Uppsala University's Museum of Botany.

Burser's Pharmacy Garden has been recreated at Sorø Museum. It opened to visitors on 3 June 2006.

Austrian botanist Nikolaus Joseph von Jacquin named the genus Bursera after Burser.
