= Scavenius =

Scavenius is a surname. Notable people with the surname include:

- Bente Scavenius (born 1944), Danish art historian, art critic and author
- Erik Scavenius (1877–1962), Danish politician, foreign minister and prime minister
  - Scavenius Cabinet, government of Denmark from 9 November 1942 to 5 May 1945
- Harald Scavenius (1873–1939), Danish politician and foreign minister
- Jacob Brønnum Scavenius ( 1749–1820), Danish landowner
- Jacob Brønnum Scavenius Estrup (1825–1913), Danish politician
- Ole Scavenius Jensen (1921–1990), Danish rower
- Otto Scavenius (1875–1945), Danish politician
- Theresa Scavenius (born 1984), Danish climate politics researcher and politician

== See also ==
- Scavenius' Stiftelse, is a listed building in Sorø, Denmark
