= Scavenius' Stiftelse =

Scavenius' Foundation
- Scavenius' Stiftelse
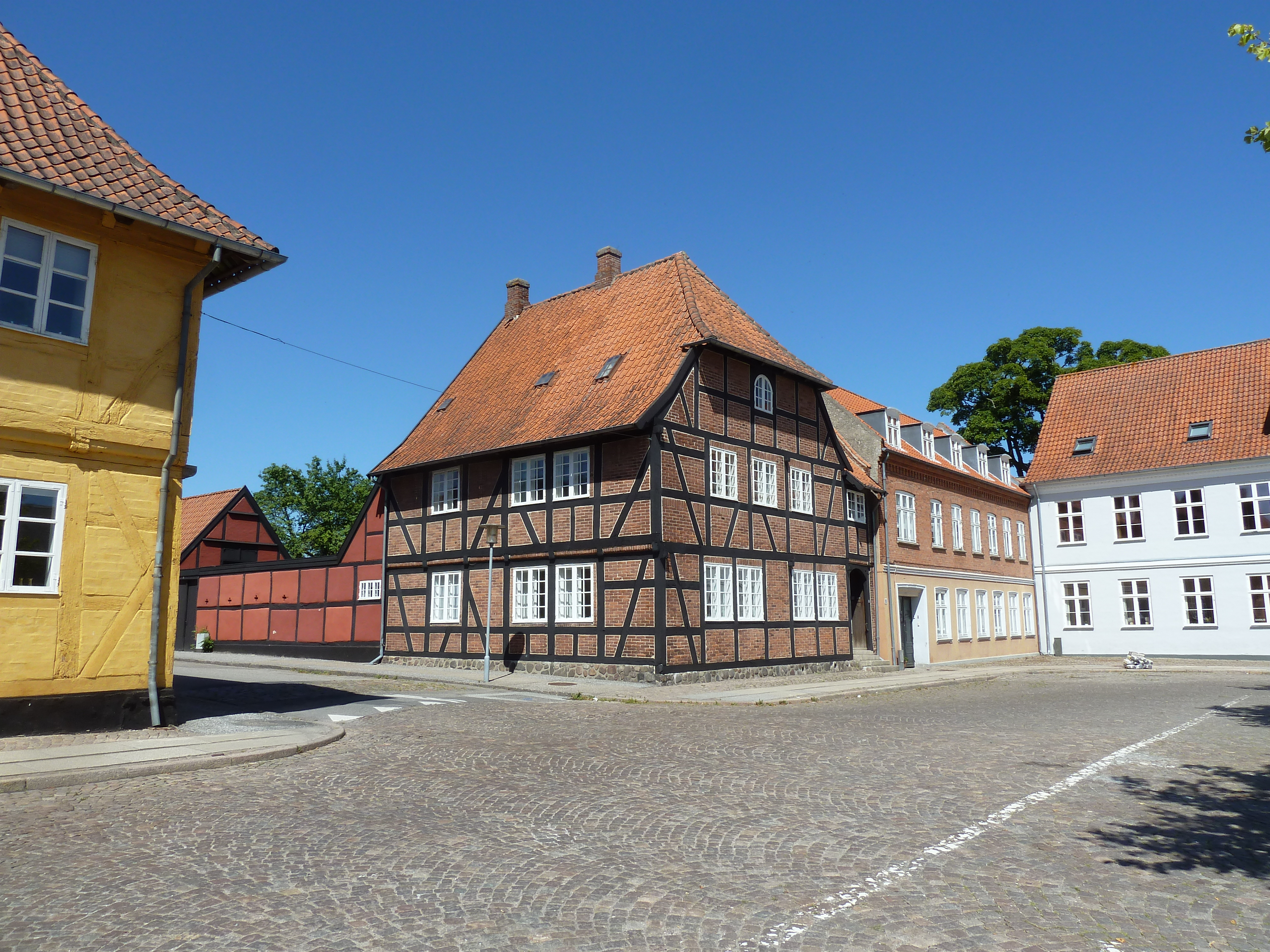
- The building viewed from the square
- Interactive map of the Scavenius' Foundation area

General information
- Location: Sorø, Denmark, Denmark
- Coordinates: 55.432°N 11.555°E
- Completed: 1700

Scavenius' Stiftelse is a listed building situated on the west side of the town square in Sorø, Denmark.

== History ==
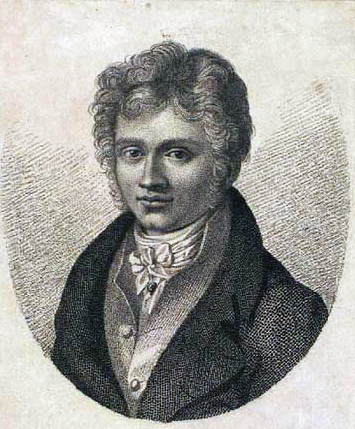
Hector Frederik Janson Estrup

The house is already known from 1682, when it was owned by Byfoged Mads Christensen. It is probably only slightly older. From 1829 to 31 it was owned by titular Privy councilor Jacob Mandix, and after his death in 1831 by his daughter, Lucie Mandix, the wife of Bernhard Severin Ingemann and one of Denmark's first female painters.

Hector Frederik Janson Estrup, who had been appointed to director of Sorø Academy in 1831, acquired the building in 1833. He converted it into two residences available on grant for widows after teachers at the school. Estrup was married to a member of the Scavenius family and after her death to her sister.

Estrup lived at Urnes gård, at 9 Søgade, another listed property in Sorø. He was the father of Jacob Brønnum Scavenius Estrup, Danish Council President from 1875 until 1894.

== Architecture ==
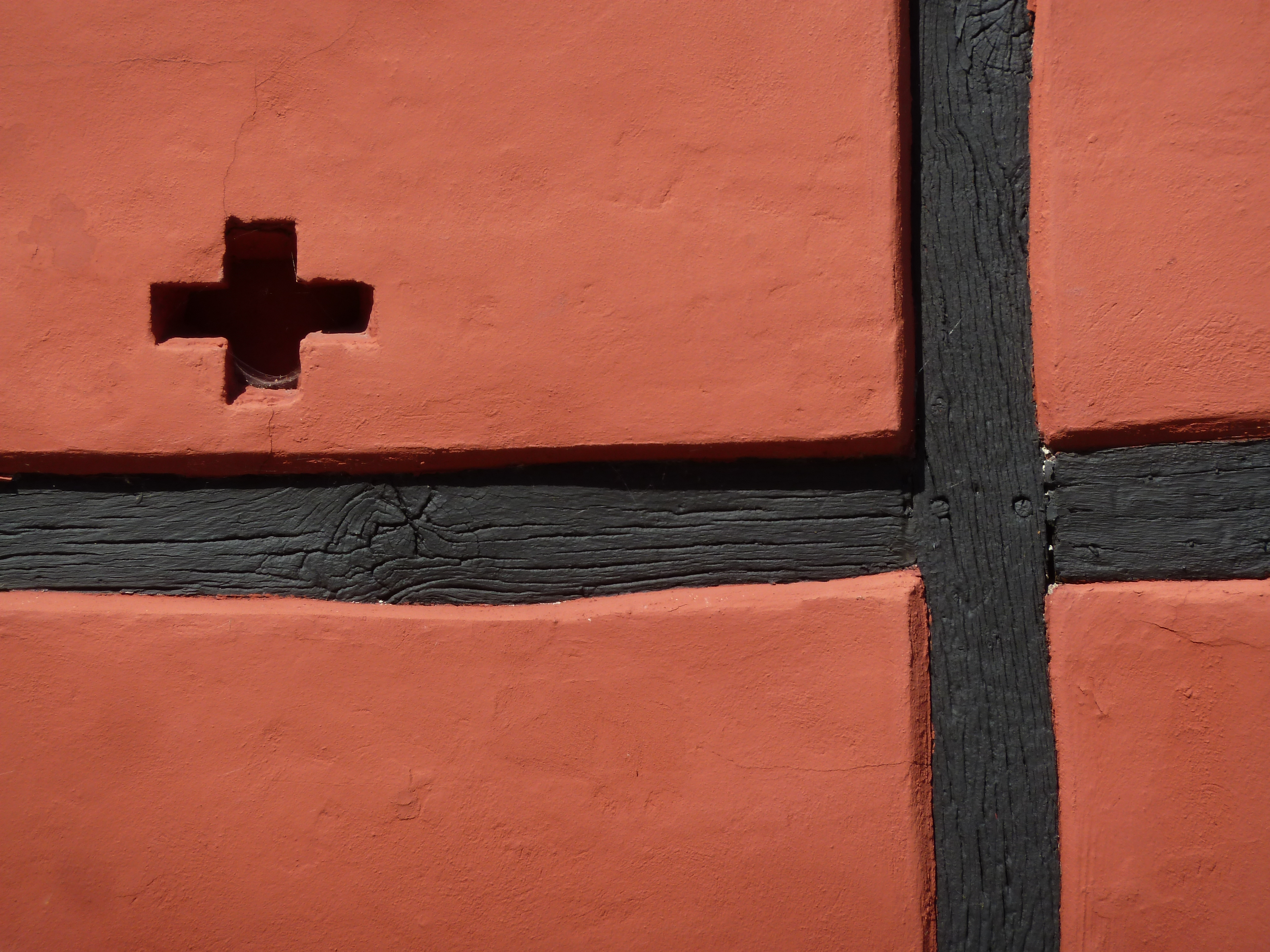
One of the ventilation holes in the barn.

The building is constructed in timber framing with fillings of red brick and white windows. It consists of two storeys under a steep half-hip roof. The current appearance with black-painted, exposed timber framing and blank brick fillings date from a restoration carried out by F.C.C. Hansen in 1910. Traces of colour found at that time indicate that the building originally stood with red dressing.

The western gable is extended with a one-storey barn, also in timber framing but with dressed fillings and cross-shaped ventilation holes towards the street. To the north, there is a one-bay, two-storey extension, dating from 1857, also in timber framing, where the current main entrance is found.

== See also ==
- Vænget
