= Vænget =

Building in Sorø Municipality, Denmark

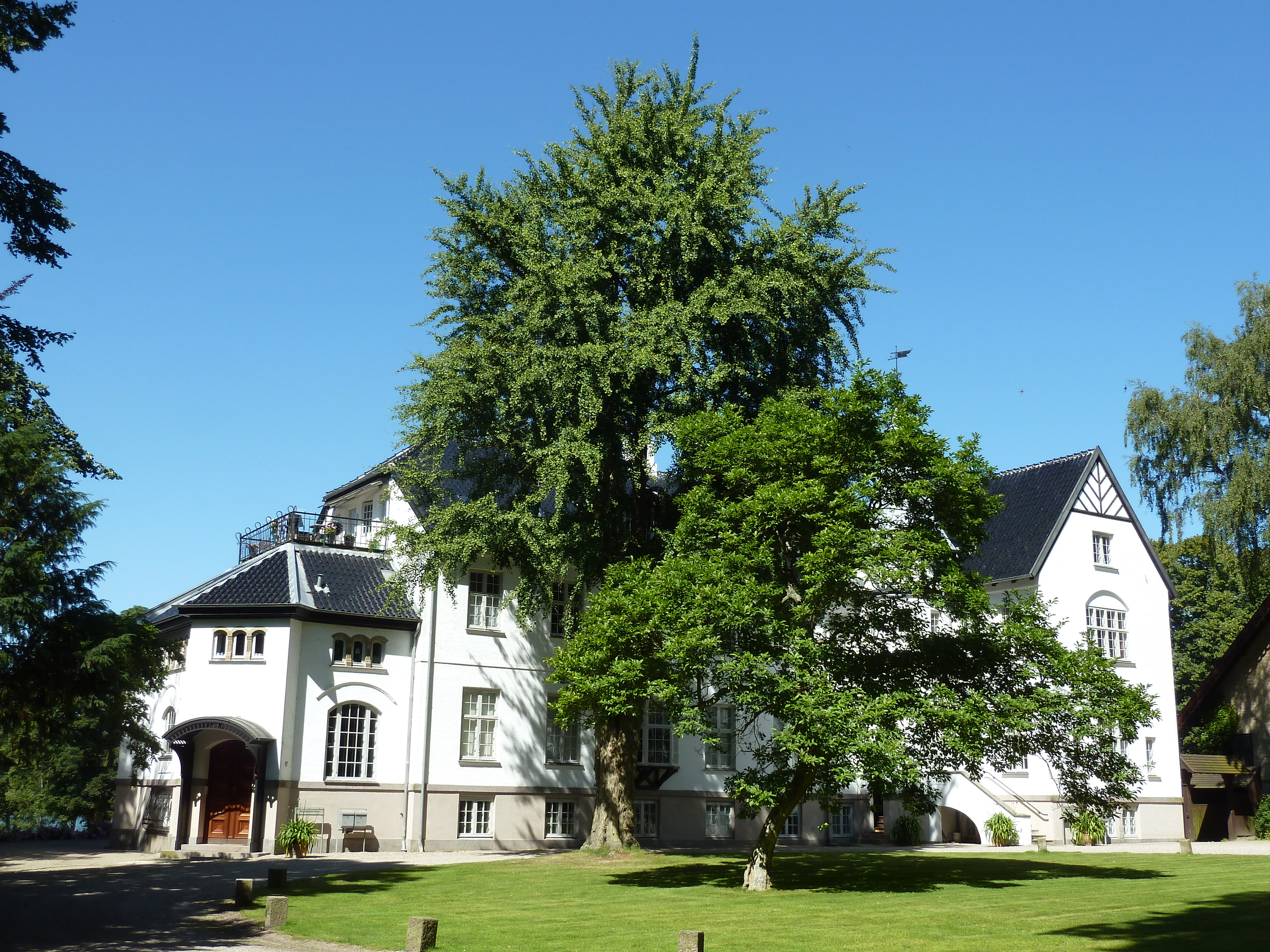
- Interactive map of the Vænget area

General information
- Location: Sorø, Denmark, Denmark
- Coordinates: 55.4318°N 11.5516°E
- Completed: 1902

Vænget is a historic building in Sorø, Denmark. It is owned by neighbouring Sorø Academy and contains an exhibition of physical instruments from before 1800 in its ground floor.

== History ==
Vænget was built as residence for the local magistrate (amtmand) by chamberlain and magistrate Anton Vilhelm Heinrich Groothoff in 1902. In 1925, it was acquired by Sorø Academy and converted into a dormitory. The ground floor contained communal facilities, such as a living room, a study room and a dining room. The first floor contained a residence for an unmarried teacher as well as for a "house mum". The second floor contained beds for 42 pupils. The dormitory was decommissioned in 1973.

== Current use ==
The first floor contains offices and meeting rooms for the director of the foundation that owns the academy. The building is also home to the head gardener's office, a lunchroom for personnel of the gardening department and administrative offices of the Sorø Cemetery.

=== Hauch's Physical Cabinet ===
Hauchs Physiske Cabinet ("Hauch's Physical Cabinet"), a collection of scientific instruments from before 1800, is on display in the ground floor of the building. The collection was gathered by the scientist Adam Wilhelm Hauch (1753–1833) on his journeys abroad. He sold it to the crown, and Frederick VI donated it to Sorø Academy in 1827. It reopened in 2005.

== Cultural references ==
Vænget was used as a location in the 1995 film Kun en pige, an adaption of Lise Nørgaard's autobiographical novel of the same title.
