= Peter Reinhard Hansen =

Danish economist

- Born: June 15, 1968 (age 58); Sorø, Denmark
- Spouse: Gridt Vig Find

Academic background
- Education: University of Copenhagen (M.Sc. 1995); UCSD (PhD 2000)
- Influences: Soren Johansen; James D. Hamilton; Halbert White; Robert Engle

Academic work
- Discipline: Econometrics
- Institutions: University of North Carolina
- Website: Information at IDEAS / RePEc

Peter Reinhard Hansen (born June 15, 1968) is the Henry A. Latané Distinguished Professor of Economics at the University of North Carolina at Chapel Hill. He has previously taught at Brown University, Stanford Graduate School of Business, Stanford University, and the European University Institute.

== Biography ==
Hansen was born in Sorø, Denmark, where he went to Sorø Akademi. He studied mathematics and economics at the University of Copenhagen (M.sc. 1995) under the supervision of Søren Johansen and from 1996 he studied economics University of California, San Diego (Ph.D. 2000) supervised by James D. Hamilton.

Hansen is known for co-authoring the book "Workbook on Cointegration" with Søren Johansen.

== Selected writings ==
- Hansen, P.R., (2005), "Test for Superior Predictive Ability", Journal of Business and Economic Statistics.
- Hansen, P.R., A. Lunde (2006), "Realized Variance and Market Microstructure Noise”, Journal of Business and Economic Statistics. Vol. 24, pp. 127–218. (The 2005 Invited Address with Discussions and Rejoinder).
- Hansen, P.R., A. Lunde (2006), "Consistent Ranking of Volatility Models", Journal of Econometrics, Vol. 131, pp. 97–121.
- Barndorff-Nielsen, O.E., P.R. Hansen, A. Lunde, N. Shephard (2011), "Subsampled realised kernels", Journal of Econometrics, Vol. 160, Issue 1, January 2011, pp. 204–219
- Barndorff-Nielsen, O.E., P.R. Hansen, A. Lunde, N. Shephard (2008), "Designing realised kernels to measure the ex-post variation of equity prices in the presence of noise", Econometrica. Vol. 76, pp. 1481–1536.
