= Berit Wallenberg =

Swedish anthropologist, archaeologist, photographer, philanthropist

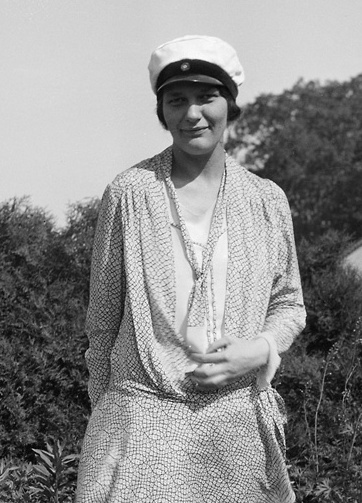
- Born: Anna Berit Wallenberg; 19 February 1902; Stockholm, Sweden
- Died: 4 September 1995 (aged 93); Ekerö, Sweden
- Occupation(s): Archaeologist, anthropologist, photographer, art historian
- Relatives: André Oscar Wallenberg (grandfather)

Anna Berit Wallenberg (19 February 1902 – 4 September 1995) was a Swedish archaeologist, anthropologist, art historian, photographer, and philanthropist. She established a research foundation, the Berit Wallenberg Foundation, that awards funds to these areas. Since its establishment, it has been providing support to cultural heritage institutions, art historians, and archaeologists. In 1936, she became the first Swedish woman to be appointed as a supervisor for the national heritage committee, responsible for the restoration of the Lovö church.

Berit Wallenberg became the only woman to receive an honorary doctorate from the Stockholm University. Her career was devoted to various forms of research, local history, and the preservation of monuments. Scientific knowledge, Christian beliefs, and local historical work, especially around Drottningholm Island and Lovå, became the most significant aspects of her life.

Throughout her career, she participated in numerous archaeological excavations. The self-portrait of one of the most famous late medieval Swedish painters, Albertus Pictor, was found by Wallenberg in Lids Church during an excavation. She photographed significant places and monuments, which have been used in several historic and archaeological types of research.

Her photographs constitute culturally and historically valuable time documentation. Her collection of approximately 25,000 photographs were handed over as a gift to the Swedish National Heritage Board's archives in the early 1980s with the hope that it would be preserved for future research.

== Early life and family ==
Berit Wallenberg was born on 19 February 1902, in Skeppsholm parish, Stockholm. She was the daughter of Oscar Wallenberg (1872–1939), and his wife Beatrice, née Keiller. She was the granddaughter of André Oscar Wallenberg, who founded the Stockholms Enskilda Bank. She was the cousin of Raoul Wallenberg's father Raoul Oscar Wallenberg. Her father was a naval officer, and a businessman. Her mother, Beatrice Keiller was the daughter of the factory owner, manufacturer, and wholesale merchant Alexander Keiller Jr., from Gothenburg. Berit Wallenberg had a brother, Carol, with whom she was brought up in Villastaden, Stockholm, a region where lived the numerous individuals who were dynamic in business, and the social elites additionally lived. The family also lived in Särö for a brief time, where her mother had grown up. They also lived in Lovön, Drottningholm, in a summer cottage they owned.

== Education ==
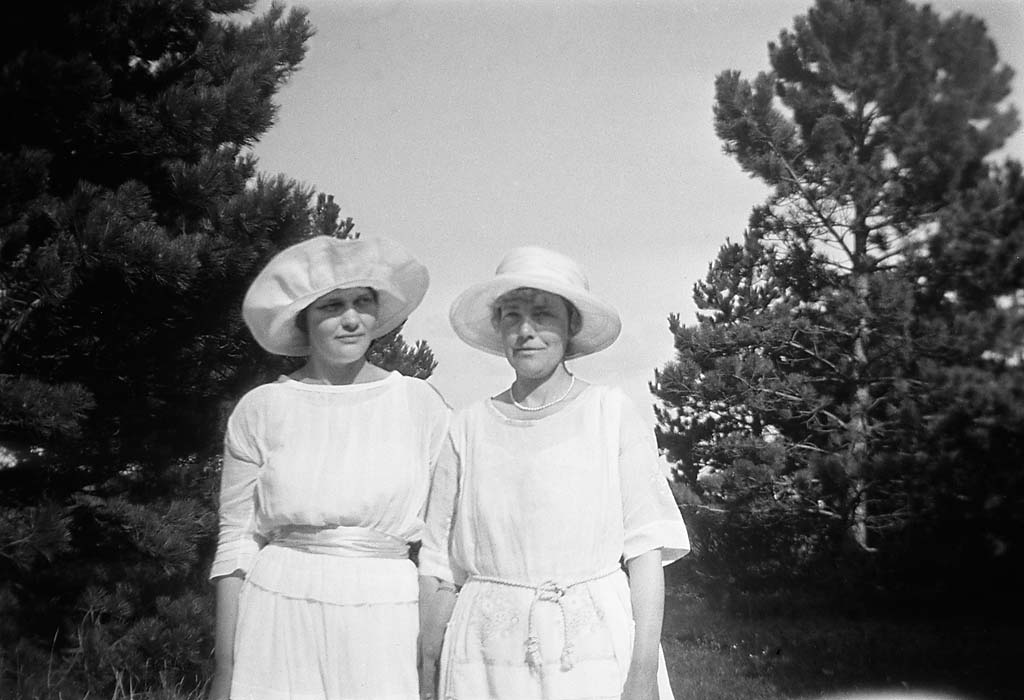
Berit Wallenberg (left) and her mother in Falsterbo, Skåne (1922)

In 1922, at the age of 20, she decided to become an art historian, thus learned Latin to get herself into high school, against her parents' wishes. However, her father supported and admired her academic life and career when she got into university. In 1925, she graduated from the Nya Elementarskolan för flickor, a former private girls' school in Stockholm. Later that year, she attended Stockholm University. Her focuses of study were on archaeology and art history of classical Northern Europe, Cyprus, and China. She also studied ethnology. She specialized in the medieval frescoes of Finland, Denmark, and Sweden, within art history. As a part of her advanced program in archaeological history, she finished her licentiate degree in 1931 on the subject of the Bronze Age period, even though she held up until the following year to get her Bachelor's certificate. That year she went to the Swedish Institute in Rome and while she was in Italy, she got a diploma from the Byzantine Institute in Ravenna. In 1942, Wallenberg became a philosophy licentiate in art history and archeology at Stockholm University, where she studied art history.

== Career ==
=== Archaeology ===
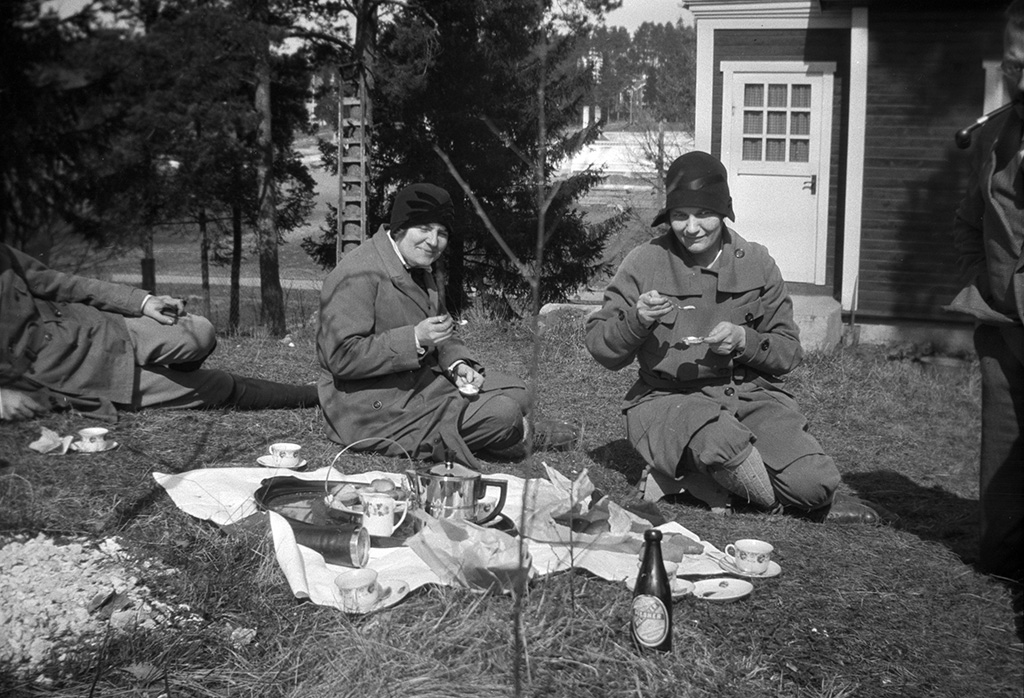
Wallenberg (right) during the lunch break at her 1930s archaeological excavation in Nälsta, Uppland, Sweden

During her student years, Wallenberg participated in several excavations. In 1924, she participated in the bronze-age excavation of Laholm. Later on, she participated in the 1926 excavation of the heathen temple of Gamla Uppsala. From 1927 - 1930, she participated in four excavations that took place at the Alvastra convent church, and at the Vendel church. During the Alvastra excavation, she got acquainted with archaeologist Greta Arwidsson. The long-sought graves of the Sverker family were discovered by her during the 1927 excavation. The restoration of the Lovö church began in 1935, and Wallenberg continued to be involved. Her involvement and participation were noticed and authorized by Sigurd Curman, who was the head of the National Heritage Board. She was chosen for that board, becoming the first Swedish woman to do so, and her commitments and contributions seemed to have far surpassed what the position required. In the fall of 1939, Wallenberg directed an archaeological excavation of four tombs under the rune cliffs of Skänninge. This was done following the instructions of the Gotland Museum and the National Heritage Committee. Over the years, Wallenberg was involved in excavations, mainly in the Stockholm area. She created a lot of documents, especially during her travels. Subsequently, she collected a large number of photographic materials, regarding many ancient buildings and residential areas in Europe that were destroyed in World War II. The images and oral descriptions she collected subsequently published will help preserve the knowledge of this cultural heritage for future generations. She donated many of her photographs to the Heritage Board in the 1980s, hoping they would be of use to future researchers.

=== Philanthropy ===
On 19 November 1955, she founded the Berit Wallenberg Foundation with a donation of 406,000 Swedish kronor. The foundation promotes research in archeology and art history, preferably until the end of the 19th century. Grants of funds are given primarily for research relating to Swedish and Nordic material.

=== Photography ===
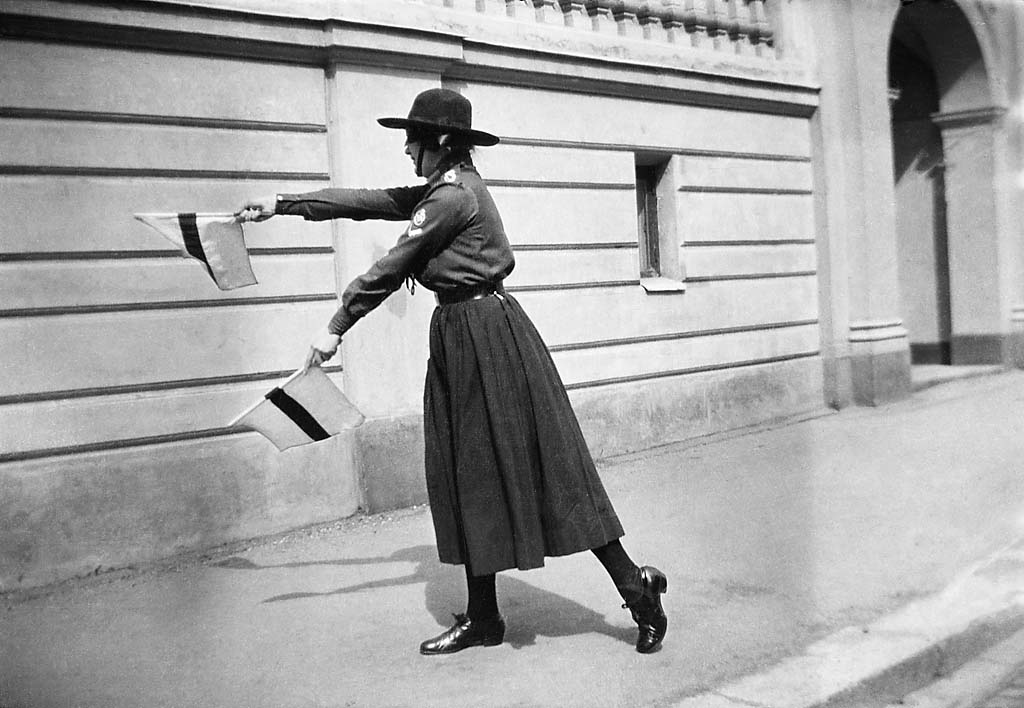
Wallenberg as a girl scout at Lovö, Sweden

Wallenberg began taking photos at an early age. Her collection of approximately 25,000 photographs were handed over as a gift to the National Heritage Board's archives in the early 1980s with a wish that it would be preserved for future research. A representative selection of the images from the collection has been digitized by the Swedish National Heritage Board, which has been made possible through a grant from the Berit Wallenberg Foundation.

The pictures were taken from the 1920s to the 1980s. Most of the pictures are in black and white. The motifs reflect Wallenberg's professional interests as an archaeologist and art historian. She has photographed ancient monuments, archeological excavations, churches, frescoes, other buildings, urban environments, and landscapes. Many photos were taken during her study trips to Europe, mainly during the 1920s and 1930s. In addition to the Nordic countries, she traveled to France, Belgium, the Netherlands, Germany, Italy, the United Kingdom, Ireland, and Russia. Berit traveled to Þingvellir, Iceland in 1930 and took many photos documenting the 1000th anniversary of the national parliament Althing. Other photos show the private sphere with schoolmates, relatives, and friends, scout activities, Christmas celebrations, and holidays. There are pictures from the homes on Villagatan 4, Malmvik on Lindö and Viken on Lovön, and pictures from an international student meeting in Iceland in 1930.

Wallenberg's photographs constitute culturally and historically valuable time documentation. Environments and buildings that do not exist today or have changed significantly have been photographed, for example, urban environments in Germany before the Second World War.

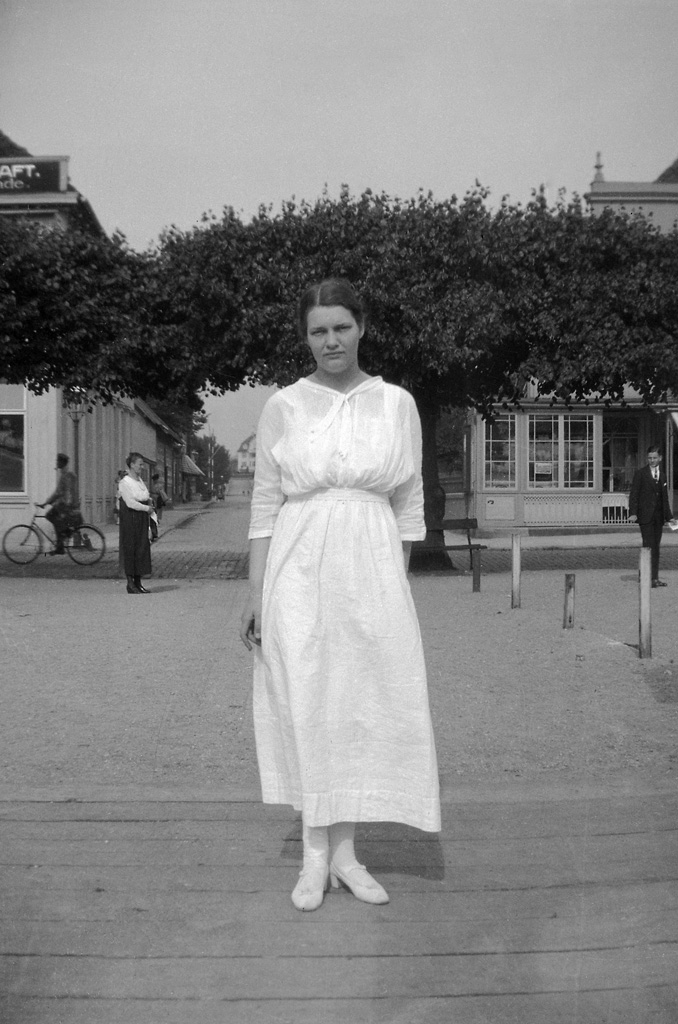
Wallenberg during her trip to Germany in 1921

== Personal life ==
Wallenberg was unmarried. Her personal life was influenced by the three pillars of family, kinship, and religious beliefs. She was an active missionary, writer of newspaper columns, and a cantata, and her social environment includes religious and spiritual leaders. Several close friends of Wallenberg played important roles in her professional and private life, including writer Stina Ridderstad, Dean Gustaf Brunkrona, and Gerda Boëthius, the director of the Gerda Boethius Art Museum. Later served as the regional curator of antiquities and archaeology, Greta Arwidsson, and the curator and art historian Agnes Geijer, their friendship with Wallenberg lasted until her death.

== Death ==
Berit Wallenberg died on 4 September 1995. Like many of her family members, she was buried in Lovö Church by the priest Lars Djerf on 14 September. He later wrote her biography, which was published in 2003.

== Legacy ==
Wallenberg's career has been devoted to various forms of research, local history, and the preservation of monuments. Scientific knowledge, Christian beliefs, and local historical work, especially around Drottningholm Island and Lovön, became the most significant aspects of her life. Photographs and documents donated by her to various museums and archival organizations have been used in historic researches. Her photographs constitute culturally and historically valuable time documentation. Environments and buildings that do not exist today or have changed significantly have been photographed by her, which are being proved useful for various historic and archaeological researches. Since the beginning of her foundation's establishment, it has been providing support to cultural heritage institutions, art historians, and archaeologists.

== Awards and honors ==
- Illis quorum (1952)
- Honorary doctorate of philosophy from Stockholm University
- Hazelius medal in silver by Nordiska museet (1973)
- Honorary membership of the S:ta Ingrids Gille local history association (1940)
- Commendation award by Samfundet för hembygdsvård (SfH)

== Gallery ==
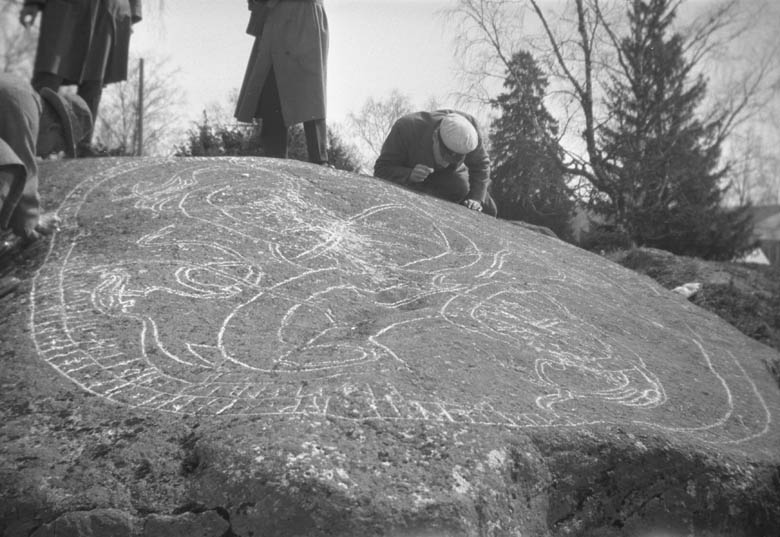
"Granbyhällen", Uppland, Sweden, 1927

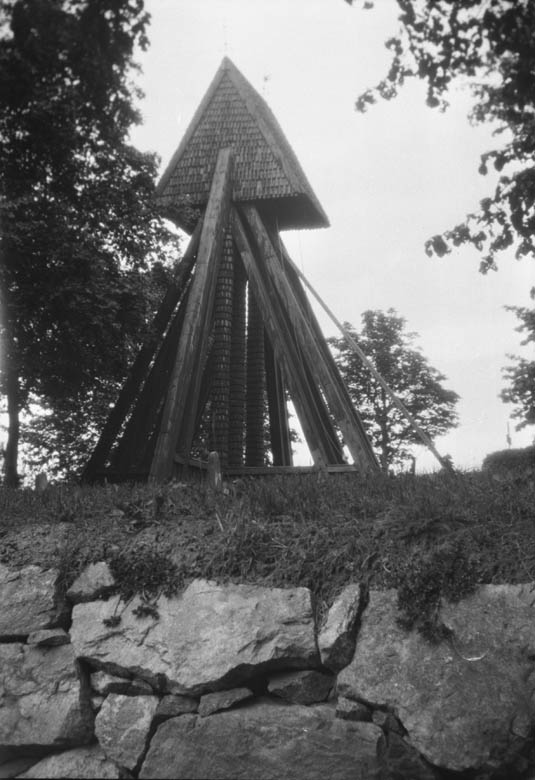
"Bergshammars kyrka" Bell tower at Bergshammar church, Södermanland, Sweden, 1928

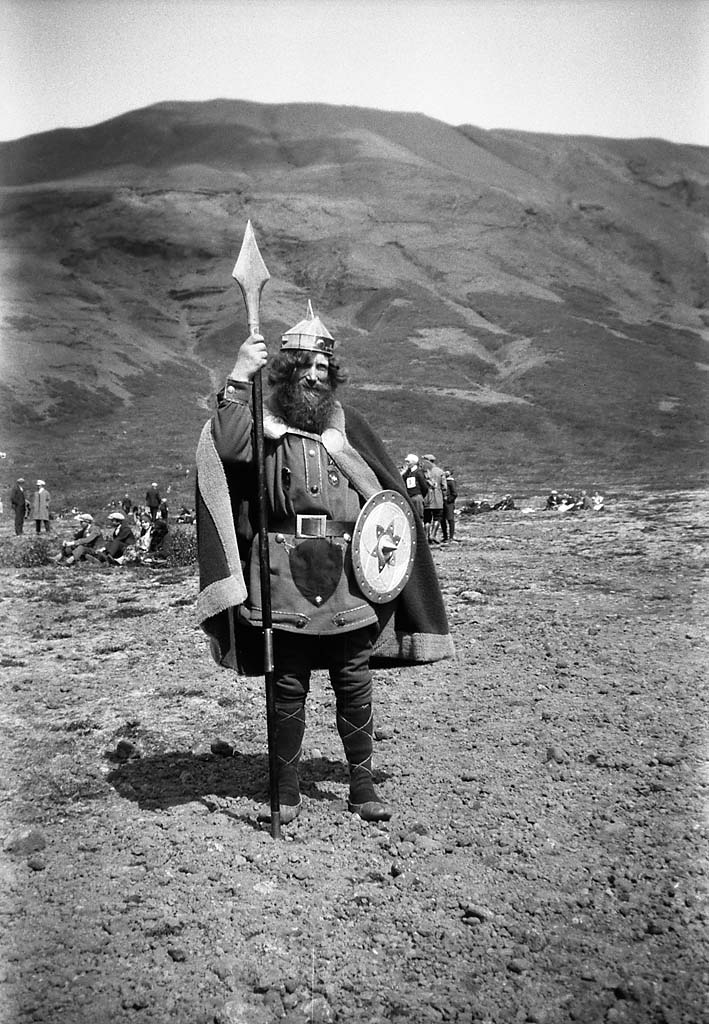
"The Viking", Þingvellir, Iceland, 1930

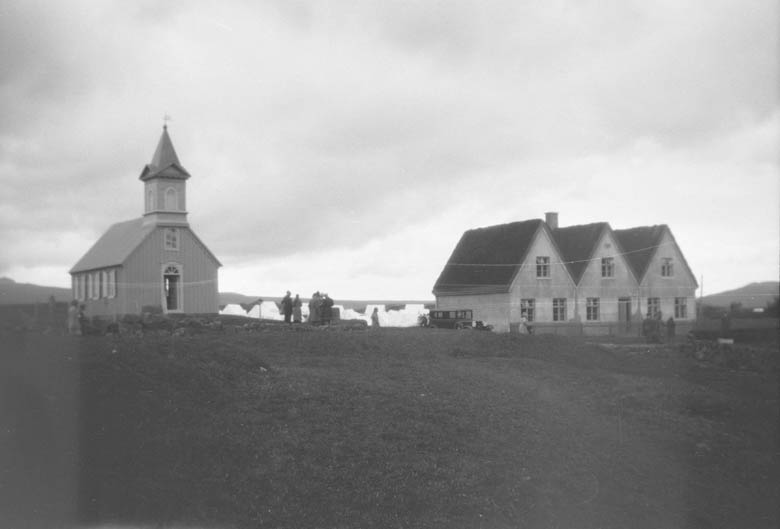
"Þingvellir", Iceland, 1930

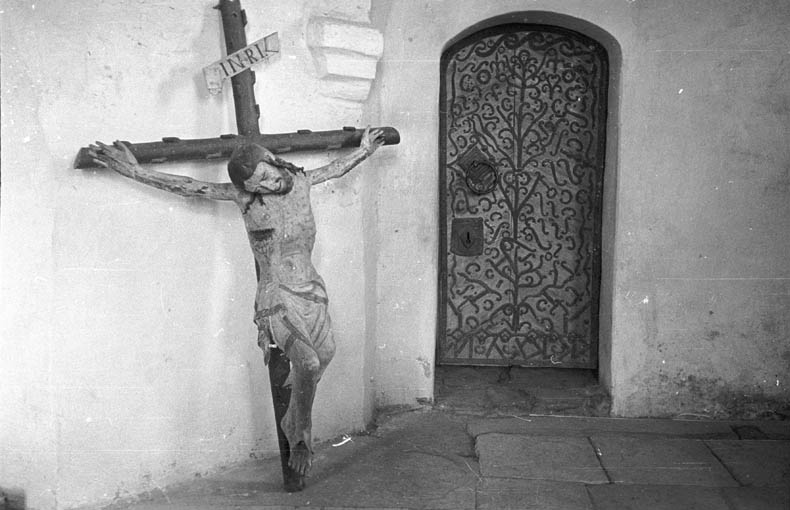
"Risinge gamla kyrka", Risinge old church, Finspång Municipality, Sweden, 1933

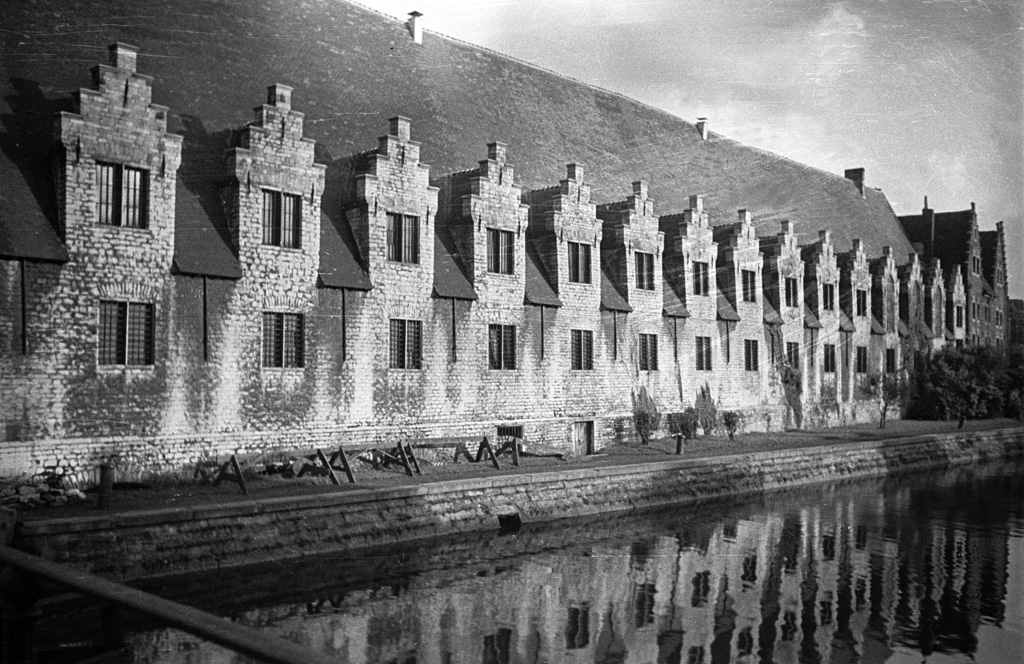
La Grande Boucherie, the medieval butchers' hall at Groentenmarkt in Gent, Belgium, 1934

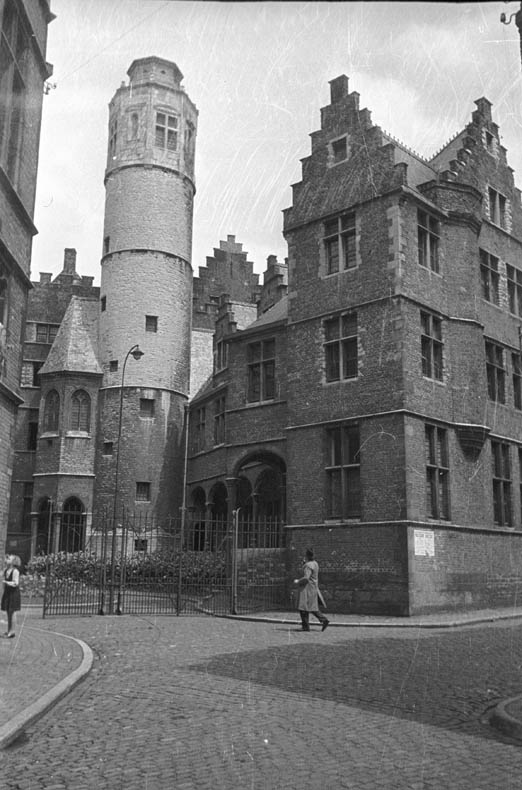
"Gent", Belgium, 1934

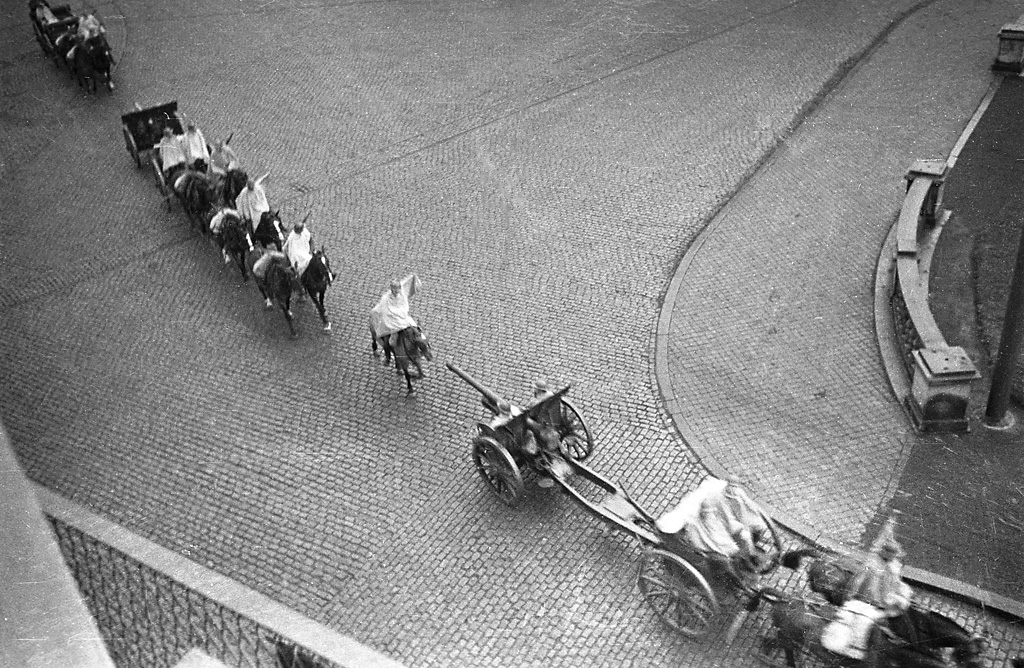
"Belgian manoeuvre" in Tournai, Belgium, 1934

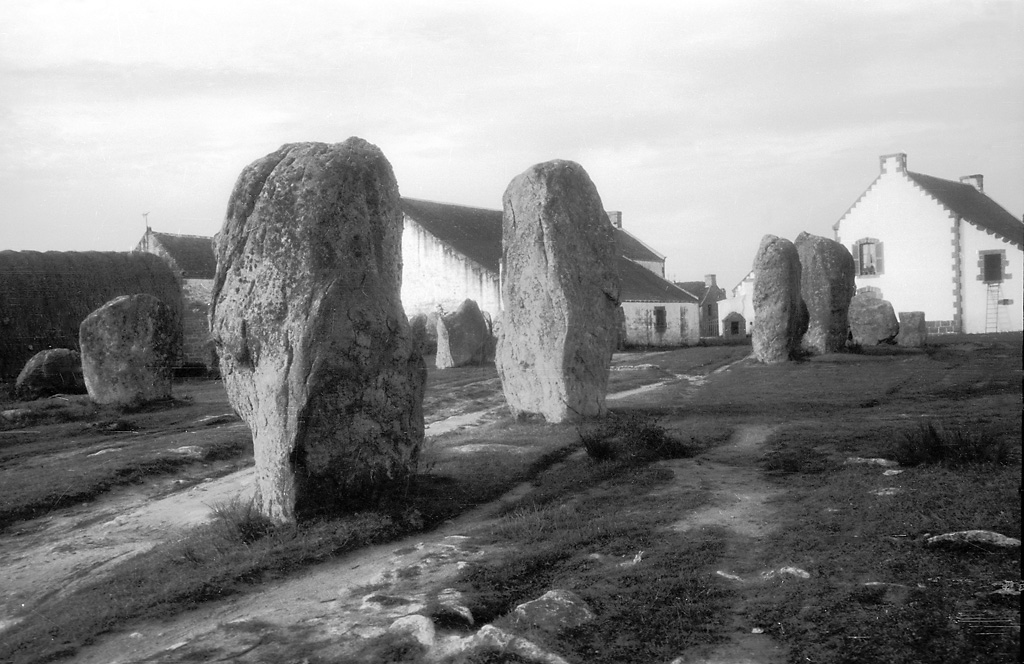
Alignments of standing stones at Ménec in Carnac in Brittany, France, 1937

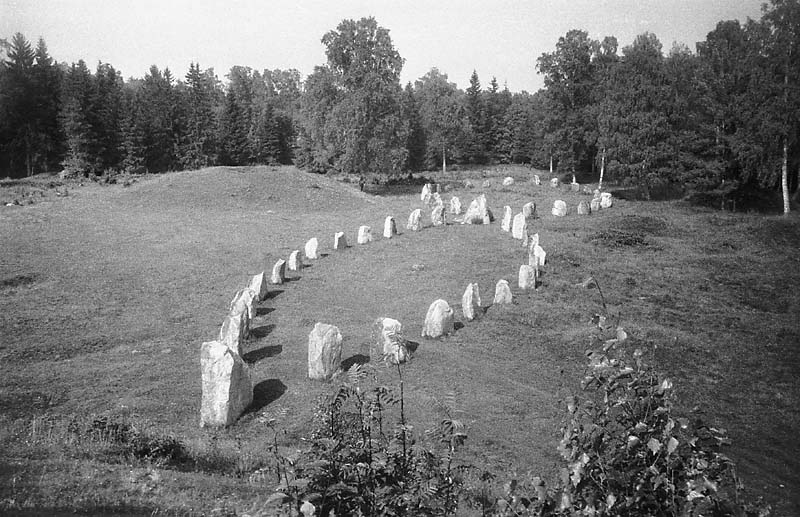
"Anundshögsområdet" Västerås Municipality, Sweden, 1939

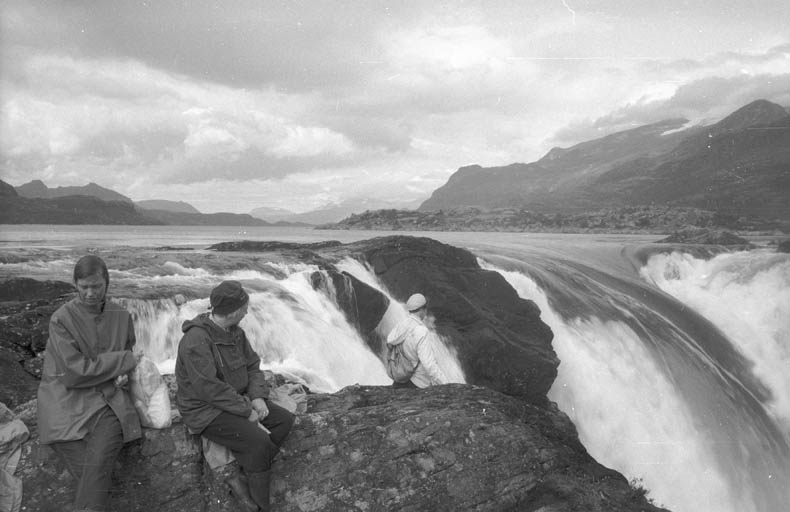
"Stora Sjofallet", Stora Sjöfallet National Park, Sweden, 1961

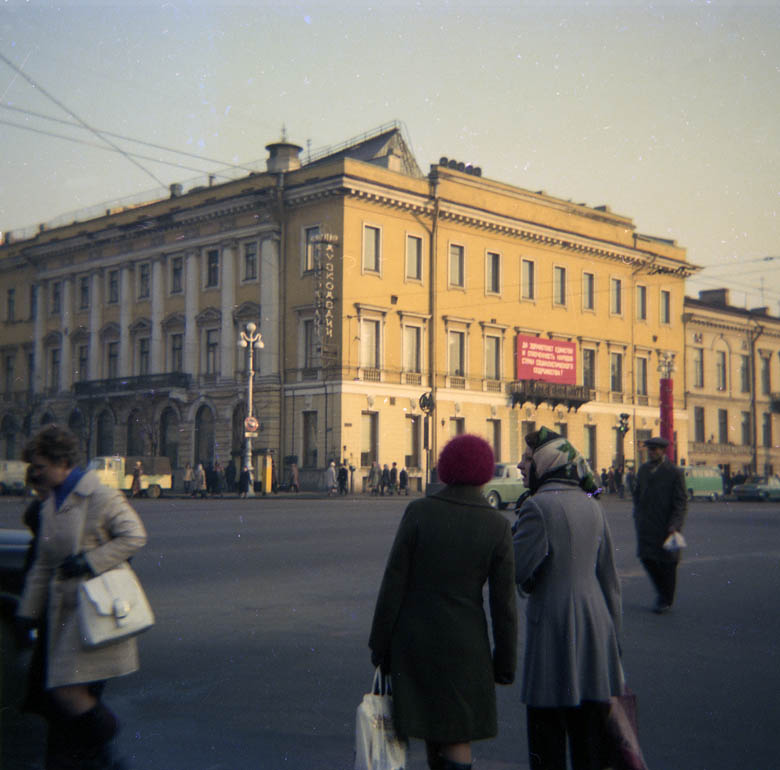
"Leningrad", Russia, Soviet Union, 1971

== Bibliography ==
- Lövkvist, Linda (2018). Svenskt kvinnobiografiskt lexikon, (In Swedish). University of Gothenburg. ISBN 978-91-639-7594-3.
- Grosjean, Alexia. Svenskt kvinnobiografiskt lexikon [Biographical Dictionary of Swedish Women], (In English). University of Gothenburg. ISBN 978-91-639-7594-3.
- Studies in North-European Archaeology (in Swedish). Almqvist & Wiksell. 1984. ISBN 978-91-22-00700-5.
- Museum, Statens Historiska; Andersson, Aron (1980). Medieval Wooden Sculpture in Sweden. Almqvist & Wiksell. ISBN 978-91-7402-091-5.
- Marton, Kati (1 October 2011). Wallenberg: The Incredible True Story of the Man Who Saved the Jews of Budapest. Skyhorse Publishing, Inc. ISBN 978-1-61145-337-9.
- Fornvännen (in Swedish). Kungl. Vitterhets historie och antikvitets akademien. 2008.
