= Gerda Boëthius =

Swedish art historian (1890–1961)

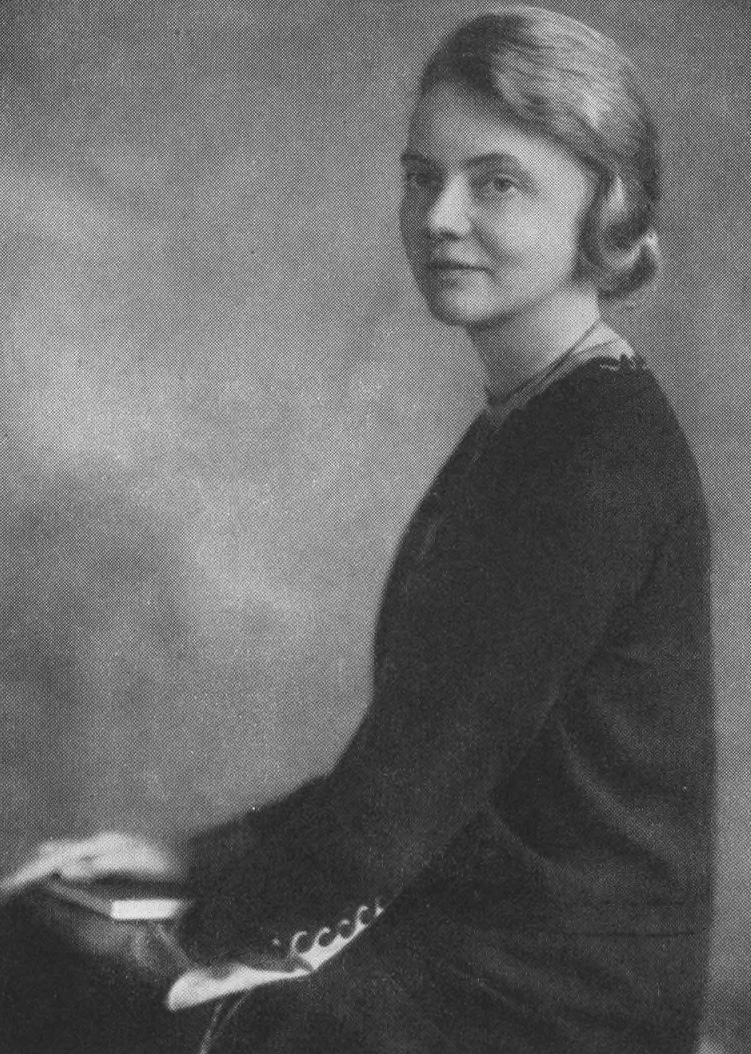
Gerda Boëthius

Gerda Axelina Johanna Boëthius (10 August 1890, Uppsala — 19 August 1961, Mora) was a Swedish art historian, museum curator and journal editor who took a special interest in timber buildings. She taught at Uppsala University from 1921, receiving the title of professor in 1938. Remembered in particular for her biographies of the artist Anders Zorn, she was curator of the Zorn Museum in Mora until 1957 and edited the journal Hemslöjden (Homecrafts) from 1933 to 1059. She was honoured with the Illis quorum medial in 1950.

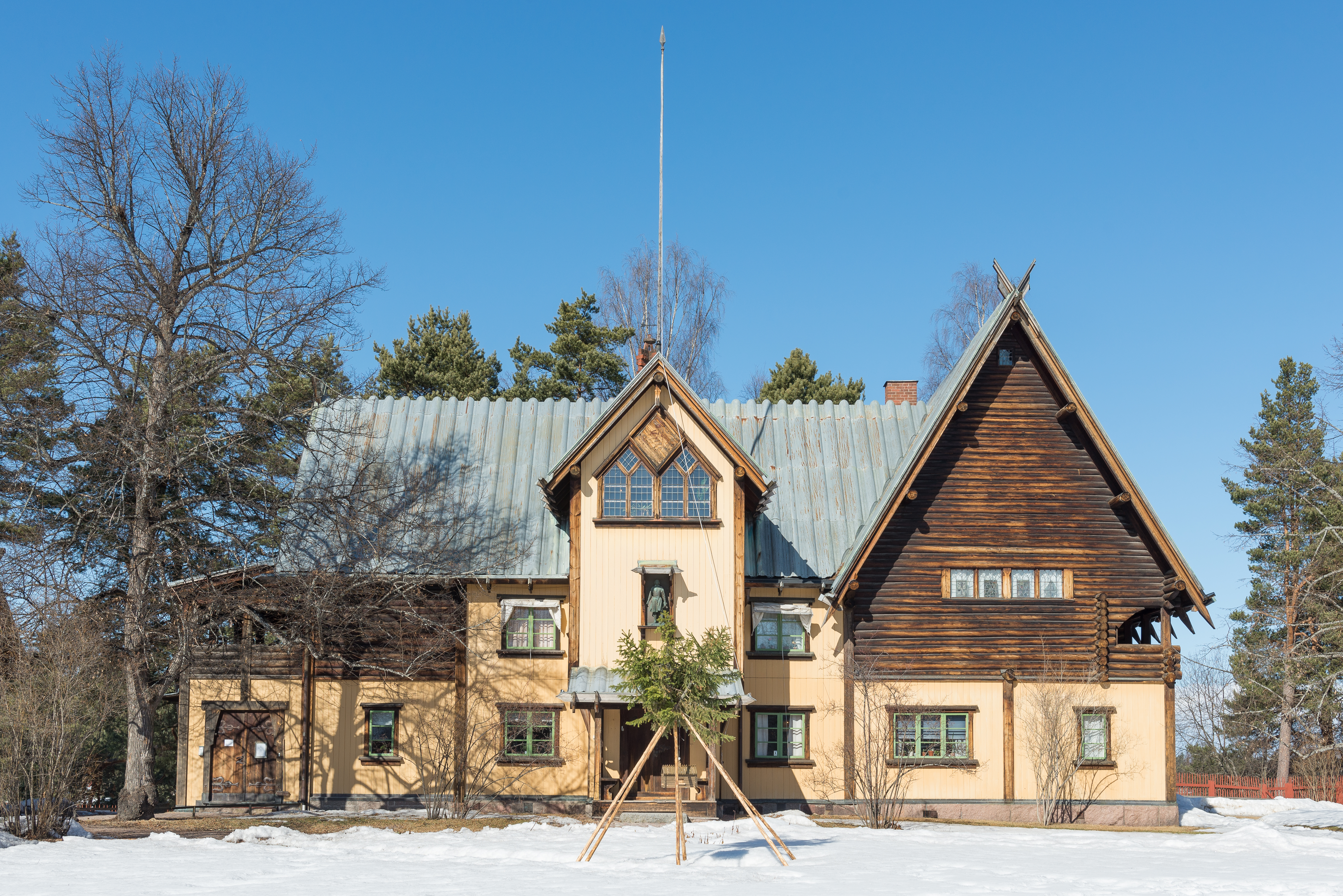
Zorngården, Mora

== Early life and education ==
Born in Uppsala on 10 August 1890, Gerda Axelina Johanna Boëthius was the daughter of the academic historian Simon Johannes Boëthius and his wife Emilie (Essie) née Sahlin. Together with her three brothers, she was one of the family's four children. After attending high school in Uppsala, Boëthius studied art history at Uppsala University, graduating in 1912. She continued her studies at Stockholm College, earning a doctorate in art history in 1921, the first Swedish woman to do so.

== Career ==
In 1914, while still studying, Boëthius received a commission from Anders Zorn whom she had known from childhood. Aware of her interest in timber buildings, he involved her in the planning and construction of the Gammelgården open-air museum in Mora which presented Swedish timber buildings over the centuries.

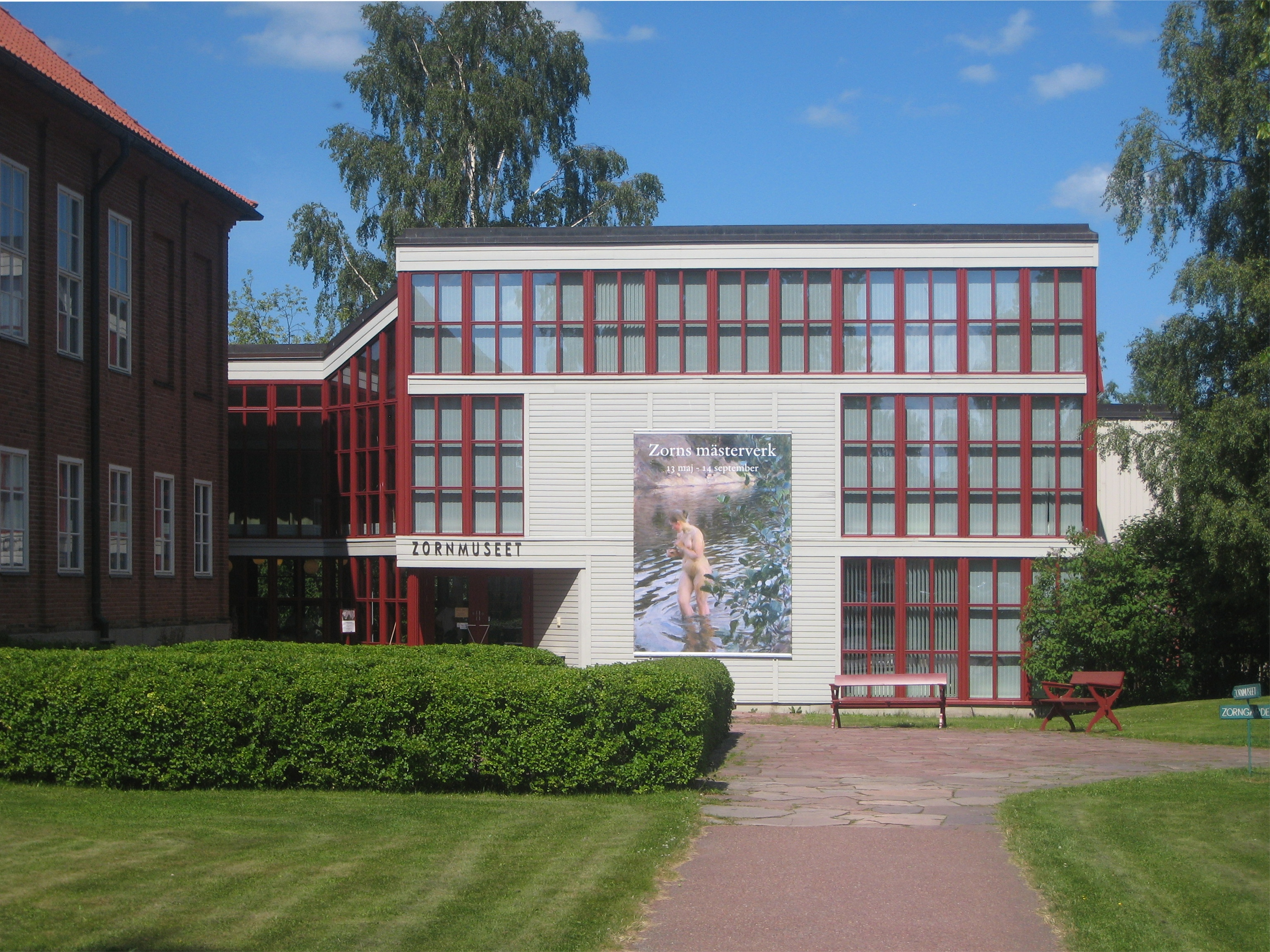
Zorn Museum, Mora

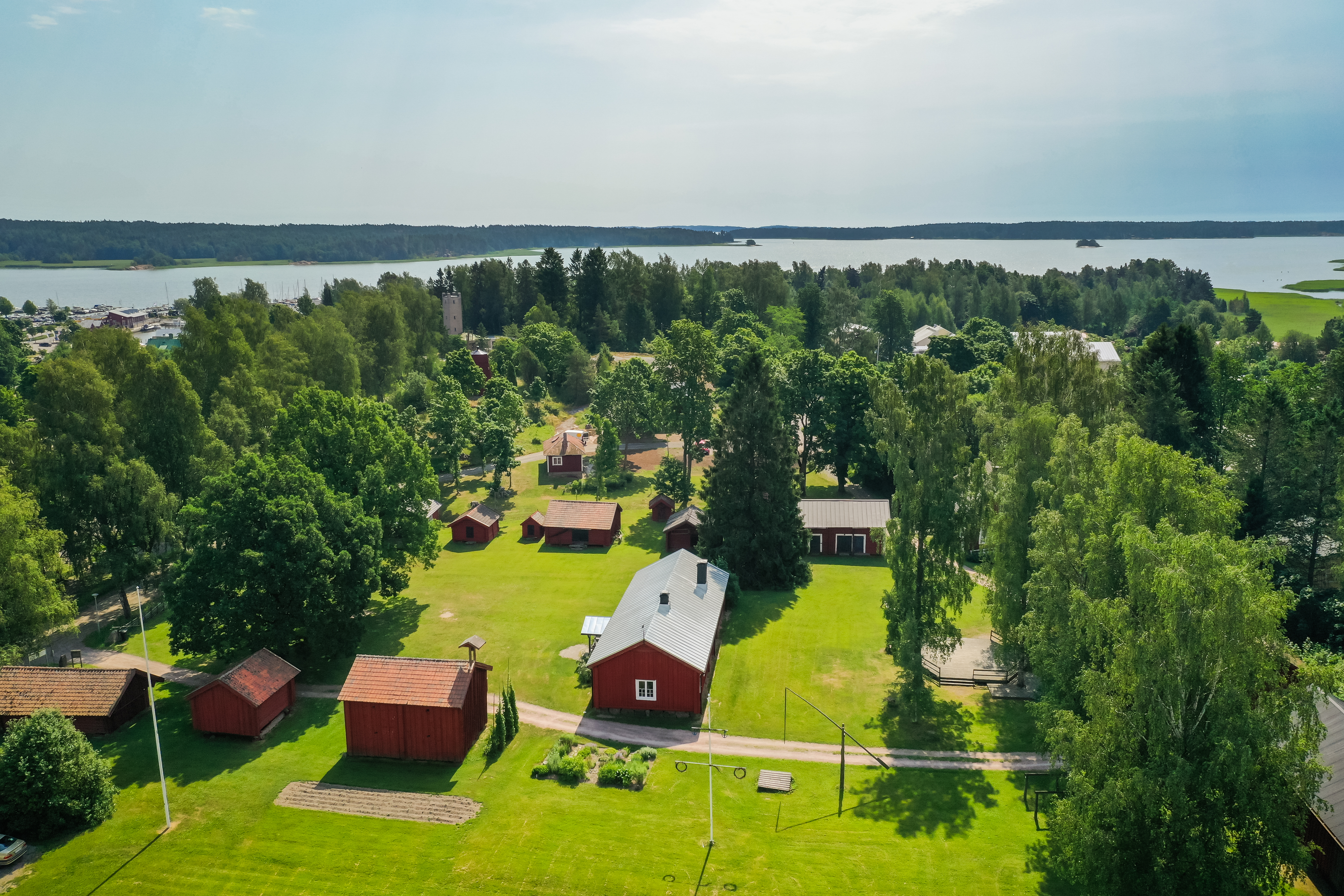
Gammelgården Open Air Museum, Mora

In 1919, she moved to Mora to catalogue the Zorngården art collection while continuing to work on her doctorate. With a thesis titled De tegelornerade gråstenskyrkorna i norra Svealand. Ett bidrag till kännedomen om stilströmningarna under den yngre medeltiden (Brick-decorated grey stone churches in northern Svealand. A contribution to knowledge of stylistic trends in the late Middle Ages) which earned her a doctorate in 1921. With the publication of her book Studier i den nordiska timmerbyggnadskonsten in 1927, she received an appointment as docent at Stockholm College. In 1938 she was promoted to the rank of professor.

For the remainder of her life she was actively involved in the Zorn Museum where after Zorn's death in 1920 she became increasingly close to his wife Emma, living together with her at Zorngården. Active in the handicrafts movement, in 1933 she created and edited the journal Hemslöjden. She retired as a museum director in 1957, devoting more time to writing.

Gerda Boëthius died in Mora on 19 August 1961.
