= Abbey Gate (Sorø) =

Gate of Sorø Abbey in Sorø, Denmark

Sorø Abbey Gate
- Klosterporten
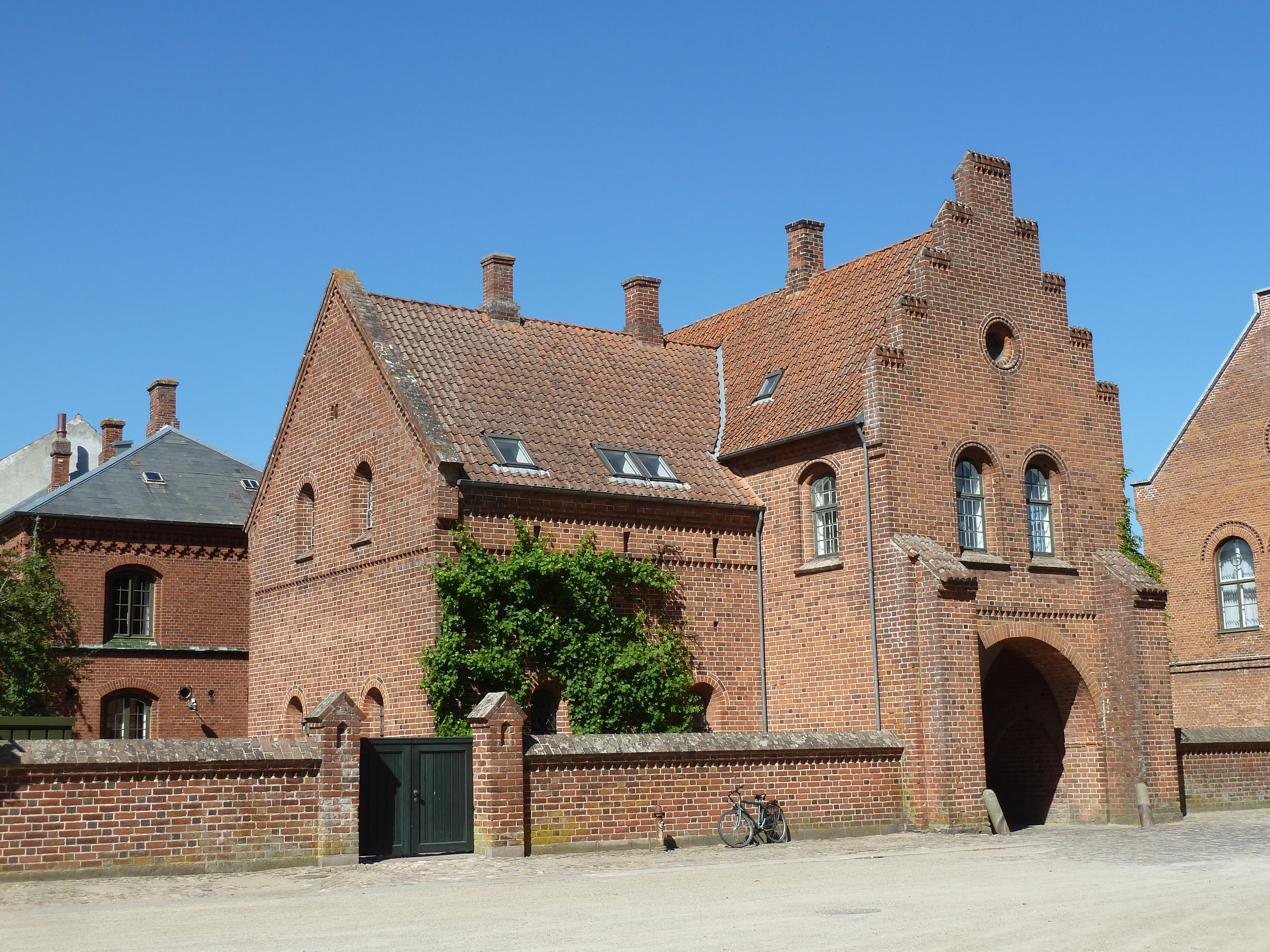
- The Abbey Gate viewed from the south-west
- Interactive map of the Sorø Abbey Gate area

General information
- Location: Sorø, Denmark, Denmark
- Coordinates: 55.4311°N 11.5557°E
- Construction started: 1160s
- Completed: C. 1200
- Client: Sorø Abbey
- Owner: Sorø Academy

The Abbey Gate (Danish: Klosterporten) in Sorø, Denmark, is the former gatehouse of Absalon's Sorø Abbey dating from about 1200. It now affords access to the grounds of Sorø Academy, which include the old abbey church, Denmark's longest church building, and is claimed to be the oldest inhabited house in Denmark.

== History ==
The gatehouse was completed in two stages, the first in the 1160s and the second in about 1200. It guarded the entrance to the grounds of Sorø Abbey, then surrounded by a wall. It faced the town centre of Sorø, just south of its marketplace. Few outsiders, and never any women, were afforded access to the grounds.

== Architecture ==
With the completion of the second stage in 1200, the building was originally built to a cross-shaped layout.

It was altered by Johan Daniel Herholdt in 1883. Until the late 19th century it was white-washed and could originally be closed by two massive doors in oak.

A western extension to the gate is known as Saxo's Cell, after Saxo Grammaticus, although his exact relationship to Sorø, let alone the building, is uncertain, and was originally used by the guards at the gate. Its interior has a central tile stone column supporting four groin vaults.

== Use ==
The gatehouses still contains a residence for one of the teachers at Sorø Academy, making it the oldest inhabited building in Denmark.

Over the years, apart from its original use, it has served as a coal storage facility, a jailhouse and an exhibition space.
