= Sorø Museum =

Local history museum in Sorø, Denmark

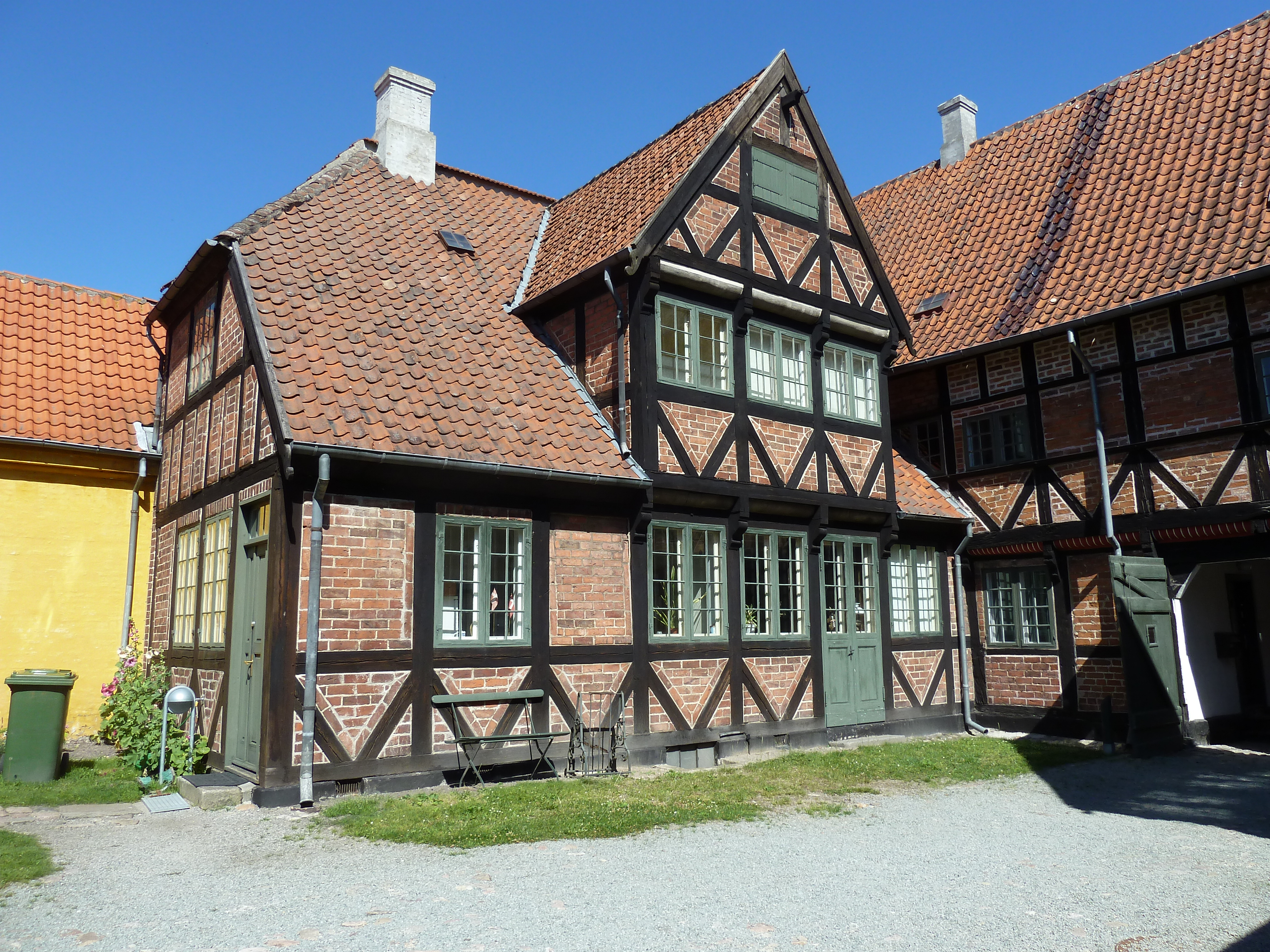
- The building seen from the courtyard
- Established: 1929
- Location: 17 Storgade; Sorø, Denmark
- Coordinates: 55.4333°N 11.5564°E
- Website: Official website

Sorø Museum is a local history museum in Sorø, Denmark. It is housed within an old inn from 1624, one of the oldest buildings in the town.

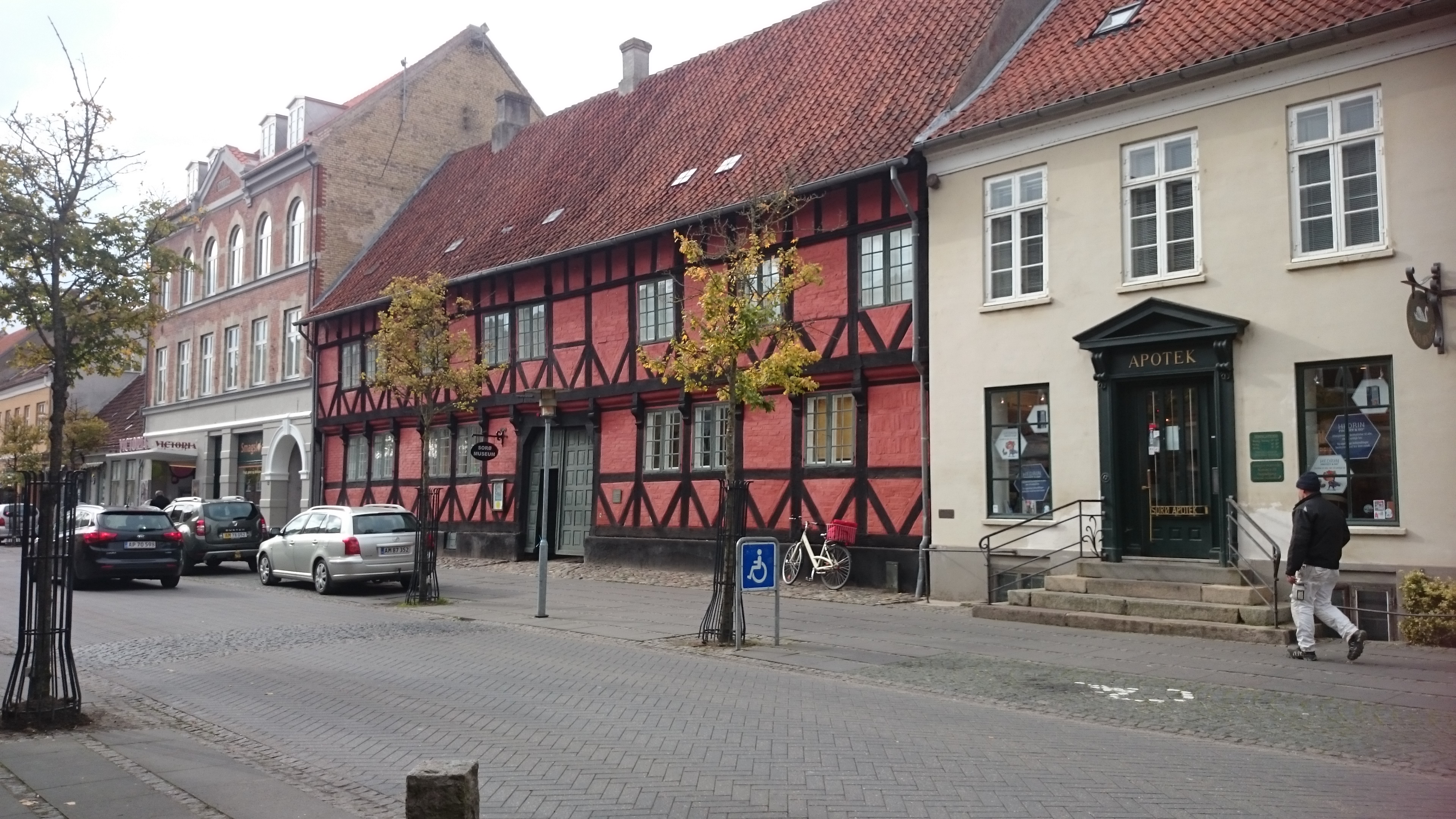
Sorø Museum

== History ==
King Christian IV ordered the establishment of the inn on 13 January 1624 so that visitors to his new Knight academy, which had opened the previous year, would not have to stay within the school grounds. Construction began the same year and was completed in 1625. The building later served as residences for professors at the Academy. The site also included a slaughterhouse. It has been a museum since 1923.

== Architecture ==
The original building towards the street is 15 bays long and in two storeys. A number of details are typical of the Renaissance. Architect Frederik Carl Christian Hansen (1858–1823) designed an expansion of the building in 1899–1900 with two lateral wings, in one storey and with large gabled dormers, which project from its rear side.

Another building to the rear of the one facing the street, also 15 bays long but only one storey high, also dates back to the 17th century in its original form but underwent alterations in the 18th century and again later. The cobbling between the two buildings and along the street is the last remains of the old pavements of Sorø's main street.

== Exhibitions ==
The museum houses chronological exhibitions about Sorø and the surrounding countryside. Administratively, it is part of Museum of West Zealand (Museum Vestsjælland).

== Joachim Burser Physic Garden ==
The Joachim Burser Physic Garden is located to the rear of the museum . It is a 17th-century style physic garden recreated by the local Society of Horological History in collaboration with the museum. It is named after German-Danish botanist and physician Joachim Burser (1583-1639) who was called to Denmark by Christian IV in 1625 where he was appointed as professor at Sorø Academy and served as the second apothecary in the town of Sorø. All plants now grown in the garden are found in his register of plants and typical of the physic gardens of the period.

== See also ==
- Sorø Art Museum
- Listed buildings in Sorø Municipality
