= Sorø =

Town in Region Zealand, Denmark

- Town
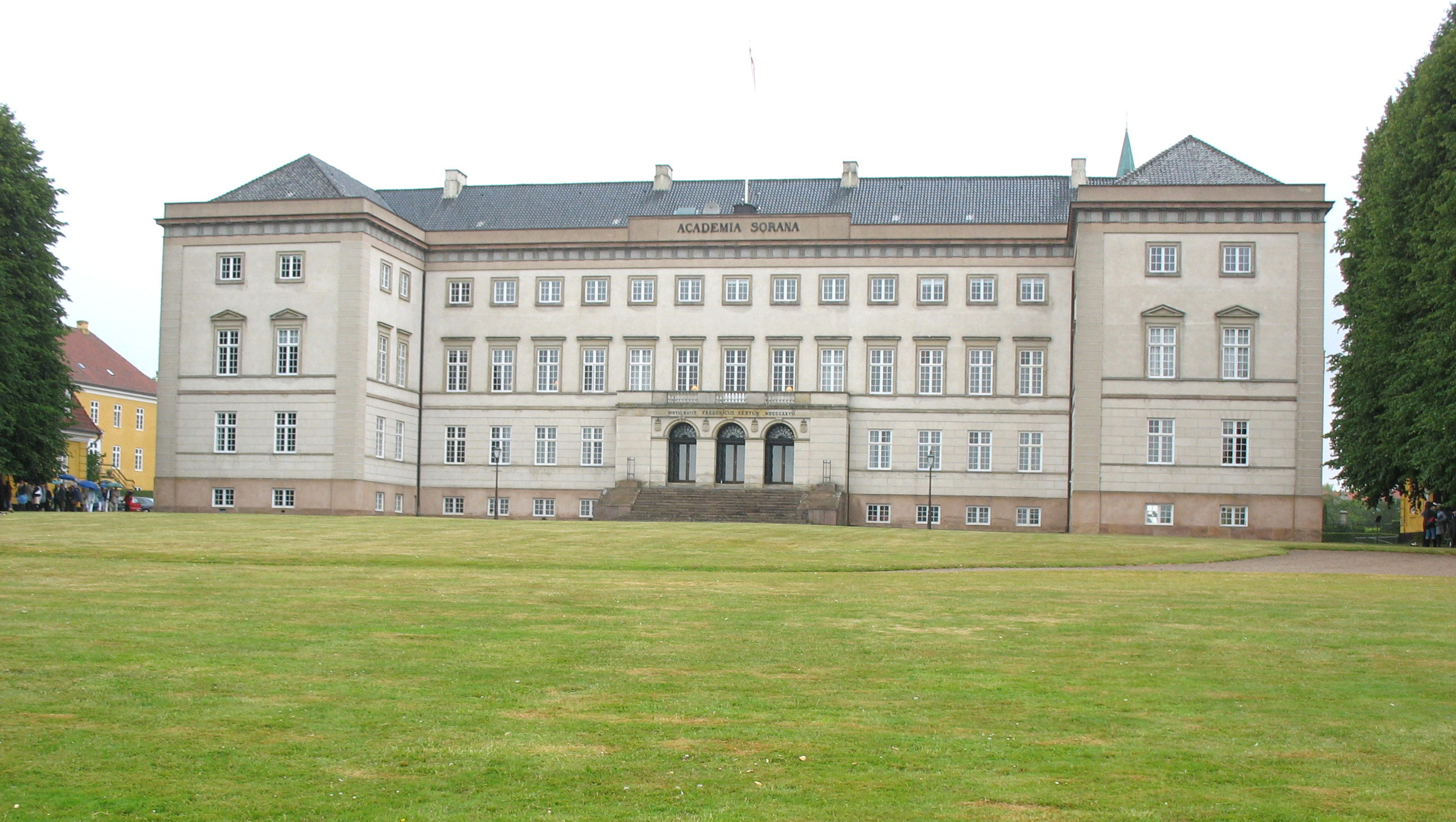
- Sorø Academy

- Coat of arms
- Motto: "Skolebyen Sorø"
- Location within Denmark Location within Denmark Region Zealand
- Coordinates: 55°26′N 11°34′E
- Country: Denmark
- Region: Region Zealand
- Municipality: Sorø Municipality
- Founded: 1100s

Government
  - Mayor: Jakob Spliid

Area
  - Urban: 5.6 km^{2} (2.2 sq mi)

Population (2026)
  - Urban: 8,415
  - Urban density: 1,500/km^{2} (3,900/sq mi)
  - Gender: 3,970 males and 4,445 females
- Demonym: Soraner
- Time zone: UTC+1 (CET)
  - Summer (DST): UTC+2 (CEST)
- Postal code: DK-4180 Sorø
- Website: soroe.dk

Sorø (Danish pronunciation: [ˈsoːˌʁœˀ]) is a town in Sorø municipality on the island of Zealand in east Denmark with a population of 8,415 (2026). It lies on the northeastern shore of Sorø Lake. The municipal council and the regional council are located in Sorø.

The town was founded in the 12th century by Bishop Absalon, as a Cistercian Abbey. The site also contained Sorø Klosterkirke, the church where Bishop Absalon and Margaret I of Denmark were buried (she was later moved to Roskilde Domkirke). In the 16th century, the Abbey was converted into a school, which became Sorø Academy. Despite the construction of a rail line through the town in the mid-19th century, the academy remained the core of the settlement, and Sorø has limited industry. Today, Sorø is a commuter town, as much of its population works in either greater Copenhagen or Roskilde.

Sorø has a number of museums, including Sorø Museum, Sorø Art Museum, and the Hauch Collection at Sorø Academy. In addition, there are many historical buildings in the town; the Abbey gate dates to the 1160s.

== Etymology ==
Over the course of its early history, the town was referred to as Sora, Soor, Soram, Soræ, Zore, and Soerøe. The spelling Sorø has been in use since the 15th century. Its name is derived from the neighboring lake (Danish: Sorø Sø), and means "the damp lake" or "the muddy lake." The name has been Latinized as Sora.

== History ==
=== Monastery settlement ===
The site of Sorø was first settled c. 1140, following the establishment of a Benedictine monastery by Jarl Asser Rig on the site. However, the initial Benedictine order was replaced by the jarl's son, bishop Absalon, with an order of Cistercians in 1161. Allegedly, Absalon choose to replace the Benedictine order as they were ill-equipped to run the monastery grounds, and the Cistercians had more experience with land management. Sorø Abbey became the largest and wealthiest monastic site in Denmark, complete with a school for the training of clergy.

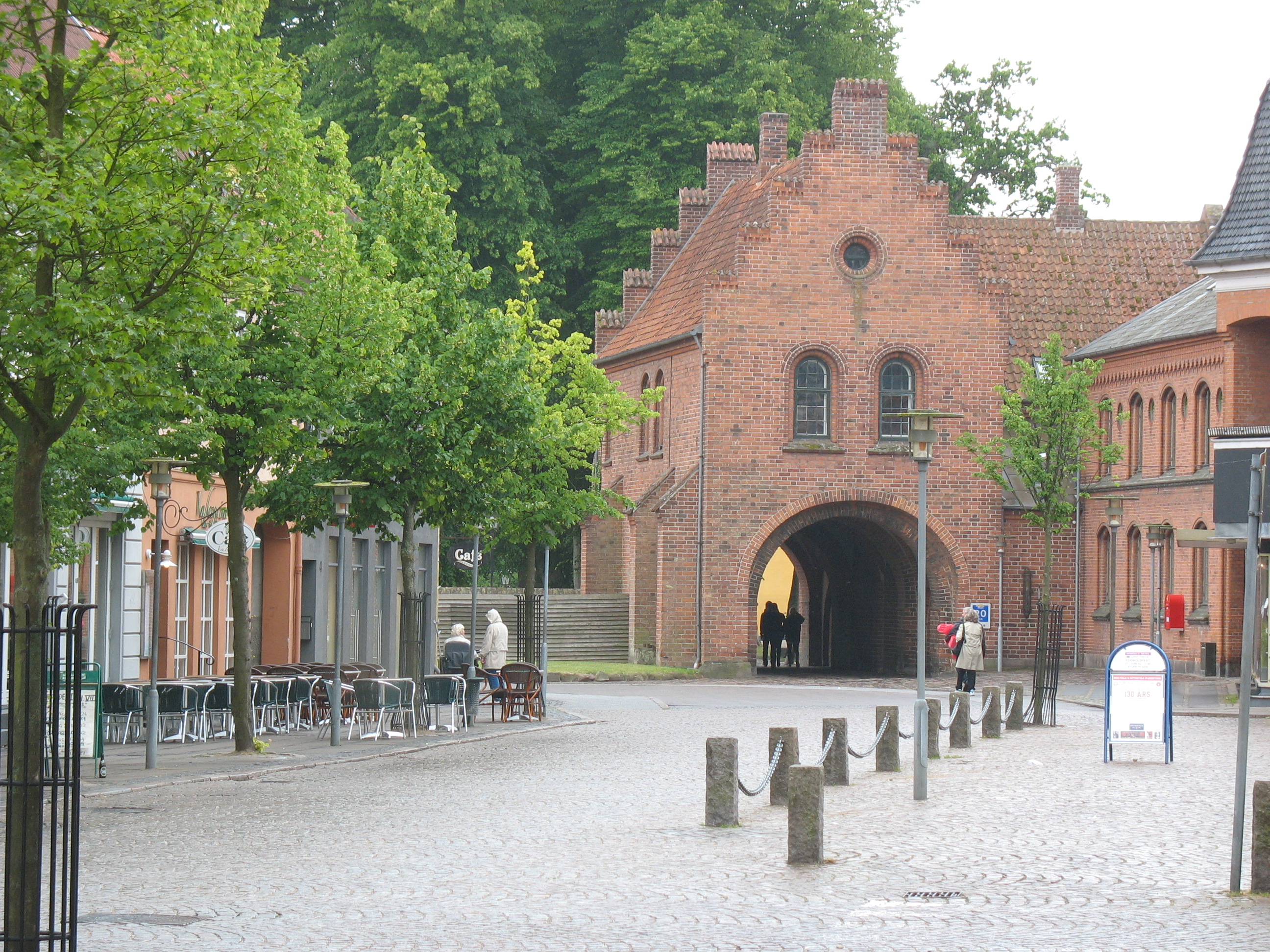
Sorø Abbey Gate, constructed between 1160 and 1200.

The abbey's status, however, did not last. By the time of the reformation in 1536, the monastery was used exclusively as a retirement home for monks. Sorø was allowed to remain a Protestant monastery to administer its large land possessions. In 1586, King Frederik II formally abolished the monastery, foundeding a boarding school on the site for the boys of the bourgeoisie and nobility, which eventually became known as Sorø Academy. In 1638, Christian IV established a knight's academy near the initial school for the education of his sons, and the town was formally given market town status to provide housing for the academy's faculty. The school's first independent buildings were constructed in 1747 following the bequest of most of Ludvig Holberg's estate to the academy.

=== The academy's village ===
The forests, lakes, and marshes which surround Sorø made it difficult to establish trade routes through the settlement. A small urban community with a number of craftsmen had grown in Sorø following its market town privileges, but most farmers in the area still preferred to travel to older markets to trade their harvests, and so the town struggled to maintain a significant trade. As a result, until the mid-19th century, Sorø was mostly populated by craftsmen, schoolchildren, and the academy's faculty. The city's survival was highly dependent on the academy, which is demonstrated by the fact that, for much of its history, the city's government operated out of a single room in one of the academy's buildings. It wasn't until 1845 that a town hall was built in the city's central square. The original town hall burned down in 1879, and a larger hall took its place, constructed in neo-gothic style.

In 1856, the Copenhagen–Fredericia/Taulov Line was constructed through Sorø, increasing traffic to the town. In contrast to most other Danish towns, the arrival of the railway did not result in a significant increase in industrialisation, and the town remained dominated by the academy, and other schools which had been founded in the area. The population of Sorø did expand as a result of the railway, however. In 1855 the town had a population of just 1,033, which had grown to 2,241 by 1901, and 4,881 in 1921. Significant expansion of the town took place towards the south, near the station, which has today become the district of Frederiksberg.

=== Contemporary history ===
Though the town's population had stagnated during World War II and its immediate aftermath, it began to grow again in the 1960s and 70s. Its continued expansion in the later 20th century may be the result of increasing desire to move to suburban areas. In 1993, the Vestmotorvej opened, passing close to Sorø, which made it an increasingly attractive commuter town.

Sorø has maintained its status as the administrative center in the region. It was made the administrative seat of the former Sorø Country in 1798, and then of West Zealand County. Following the municipal reform of 2007, Sorø became the seat of the newly formed Sorø Municipality.

== Transportation ==
=== Rail ===
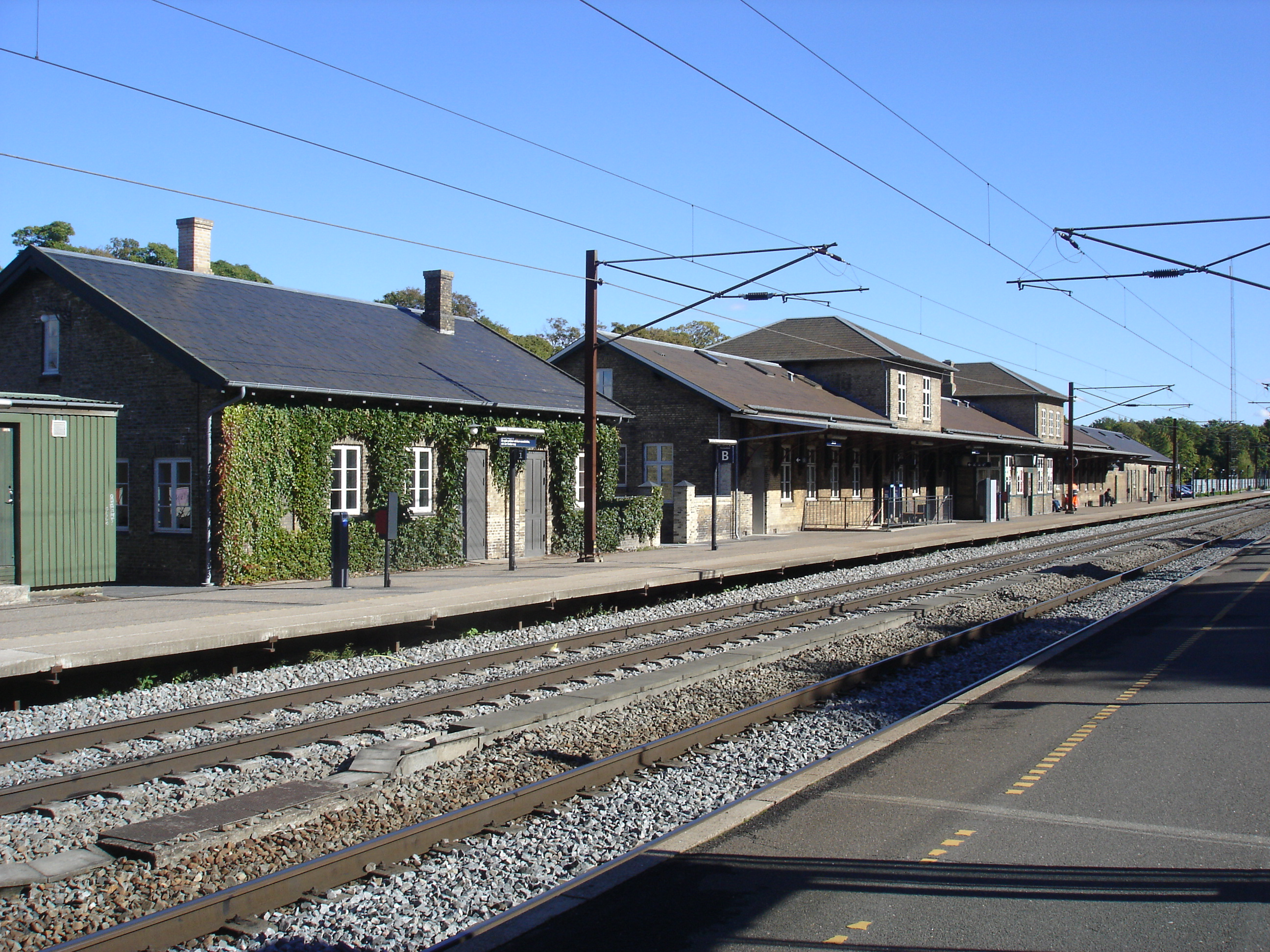
Sorø railway station.

Sorø is located on the main line Copenhagen–Fredericia railway line from Copenhagen to Funen and Jutland. Sorø railway station is located south of the town in the district of Frederiksberg, and offers direct InterCity services to Copenhagen, Funen and Jutland operated by the national railway company DSB.

== Notable people ==
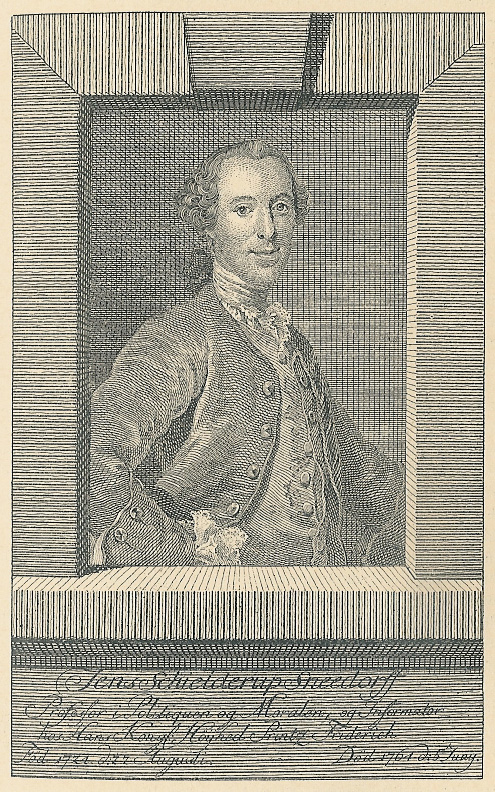
Jens Schielderup Sneedorff, 1764

- Absalon (ca.1128–1201) statesman, bishop of Roskilde, and archbishop of Lund
- Caspar Bartholin the Elder (1585–1629 in Sorø) physician, scientist and theologian
- Ludvig Holberg, Baron of Holberg (1684–1754) writer, philosopher, and historian; buried in Sorø
- Otto Thott (1703–1785) Count and landowner, lived and buried in Sorø
- Jens Schielderup Sneedorff (1724 in Sorø–1764) author and influential scholar of the Age of Enlightenment
- Jens Paludan-Müller (1771 in Sorø–1845) Bishop of Aarhus, teacher, and author
- Christian Molbech (1783 in Sorø–1857) historian and critic
- Bernhard Severin Ingemann (1789–1862 in Sorø) novelist and poet.
- Louise Thomsen (1823 in Sorø–1907) pioneering photographer
- Christian Frederik Lütken (1827 in Sorø–1901) zoologist and naturalist
- Julius Petersen (1839 in Sorø–1910) mathematician on graph theory
- Emilie Mundt (1842 in Sorø–1922) painter of portraits of children
- Bernhard Bang (1848 in Sorø–1932) veterinarian, worked on bovine TB
- Margrete Heiberg Bose (1865 in Sorø–1952) Argentine physicist
- Thorkel Møller (1868 in Sorø–1946) architect, worked in Aarhus
- Astrid Holm (1893 in Sønder Bjerge Sogn – 1961) theater and film actress from the early silent film era
- Lulu Ziegler (1903–1973) actress, singer and theatre director
- Yvonne Herløv Andersen (born 1942) politician who represented Sorø in the Folketing
- Ina Skriver (born 1945 in Sorø) actress and model
- Peter Reinhard Hansen (born 1968 in Sorø) economist
- Martin Høgsted (born 1982 in Dianalund) stand-up comedian
- Trine Bille (born 1964 in Sorø) cultural economist

=== Sport ===
- Axel Thayssen (1885 in Sorø–1952) tennis player, competed in the 1912 Summer Olympics
- Bent Jensen (born 1925 in Sorø–2016) rower, competed at the 1952 Summer Olympics
- Trine Hansen (born 1973) rower, bronze medallist at the 1996 Summer Olympics, grew up in Sorø

== Gallery ==
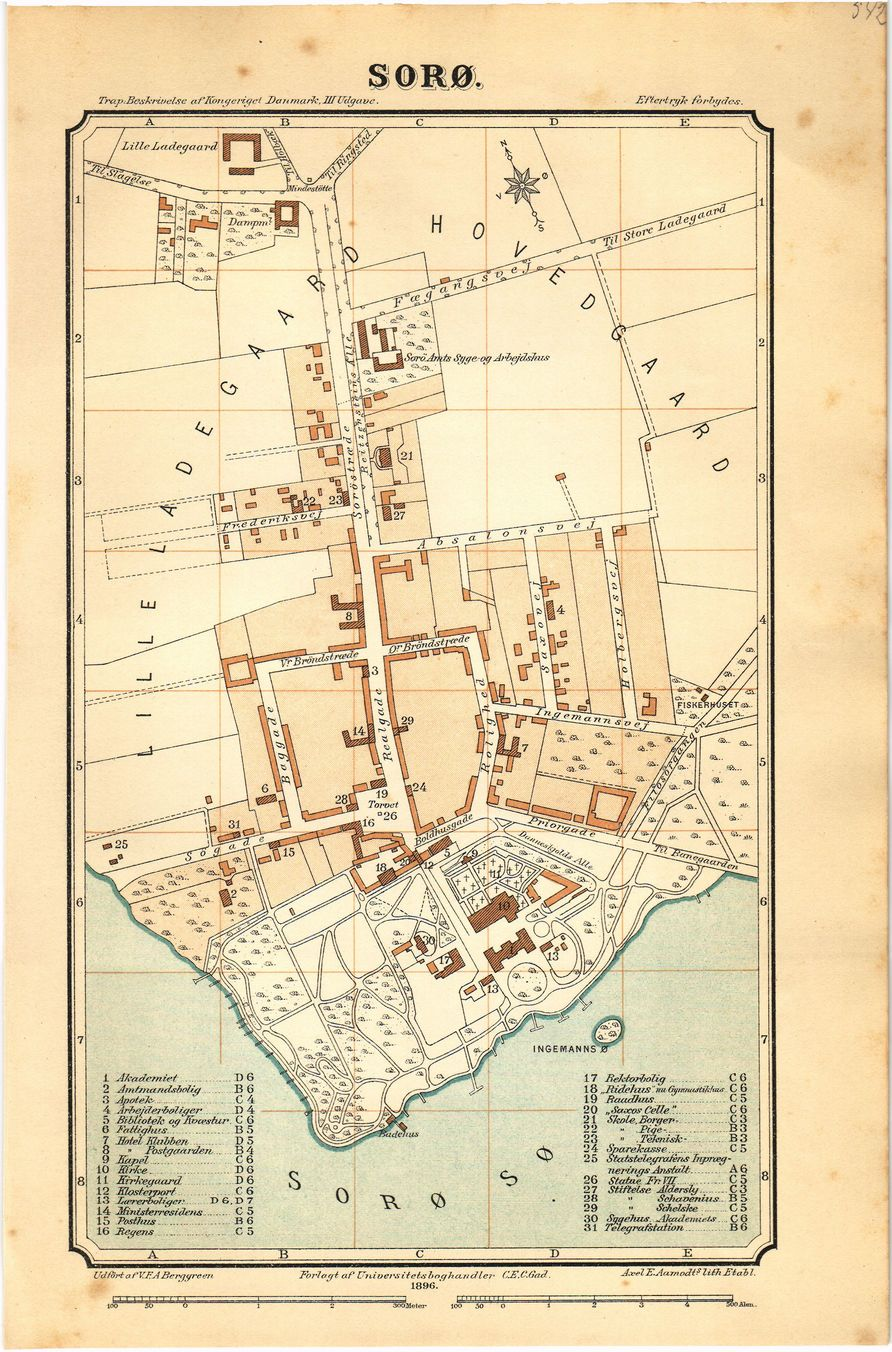
Map of Sorø by V.F.A. Berggreen, 1896.

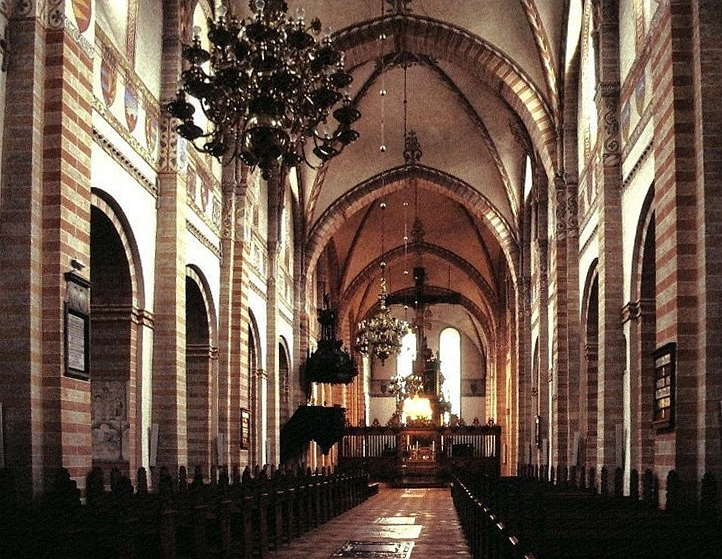
The interior of Sorø Abbey Church, 2012.

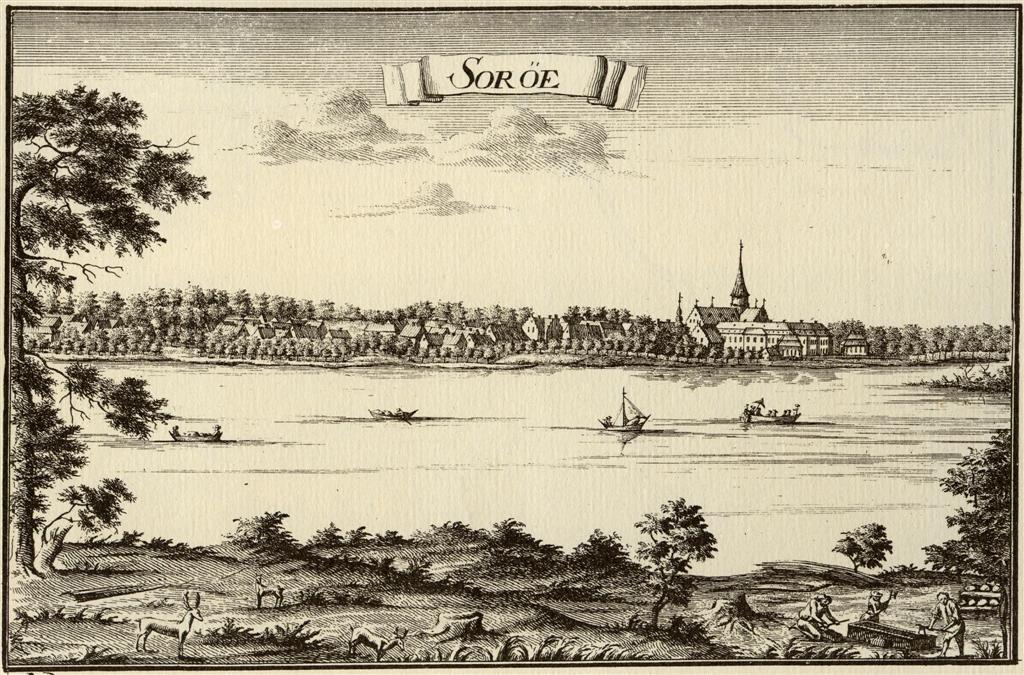
Depiction of the view of Sorø from across the lake with Sorø Abbey Church emerging on the upper right.

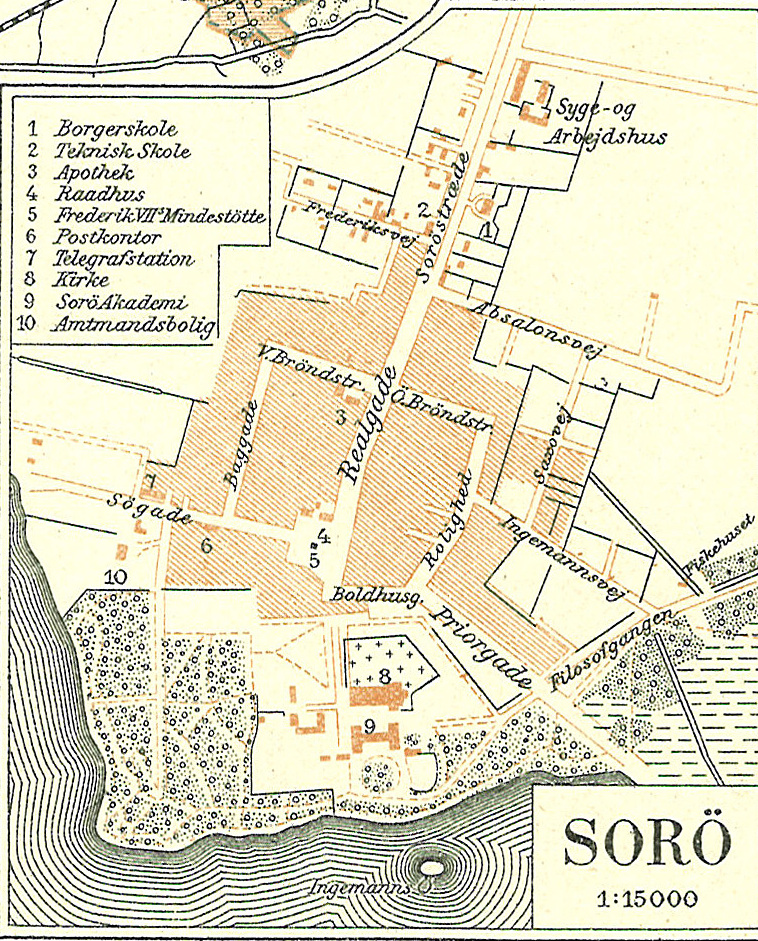
Map of Sorø from Frems Amtskort over Danmark, c. 1900.

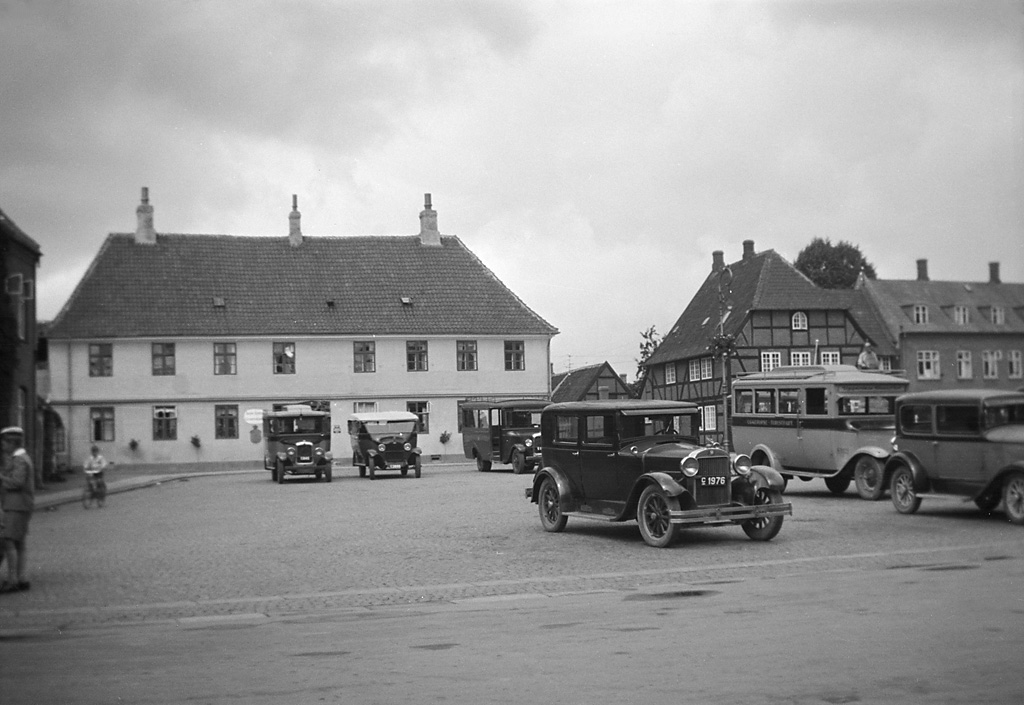
Photography of Torvet Square, 1933, Berit Wallenberg. The building on the left of the image is Regensen, a 17th-century building used as a boarding house for students at Sorø Academy.

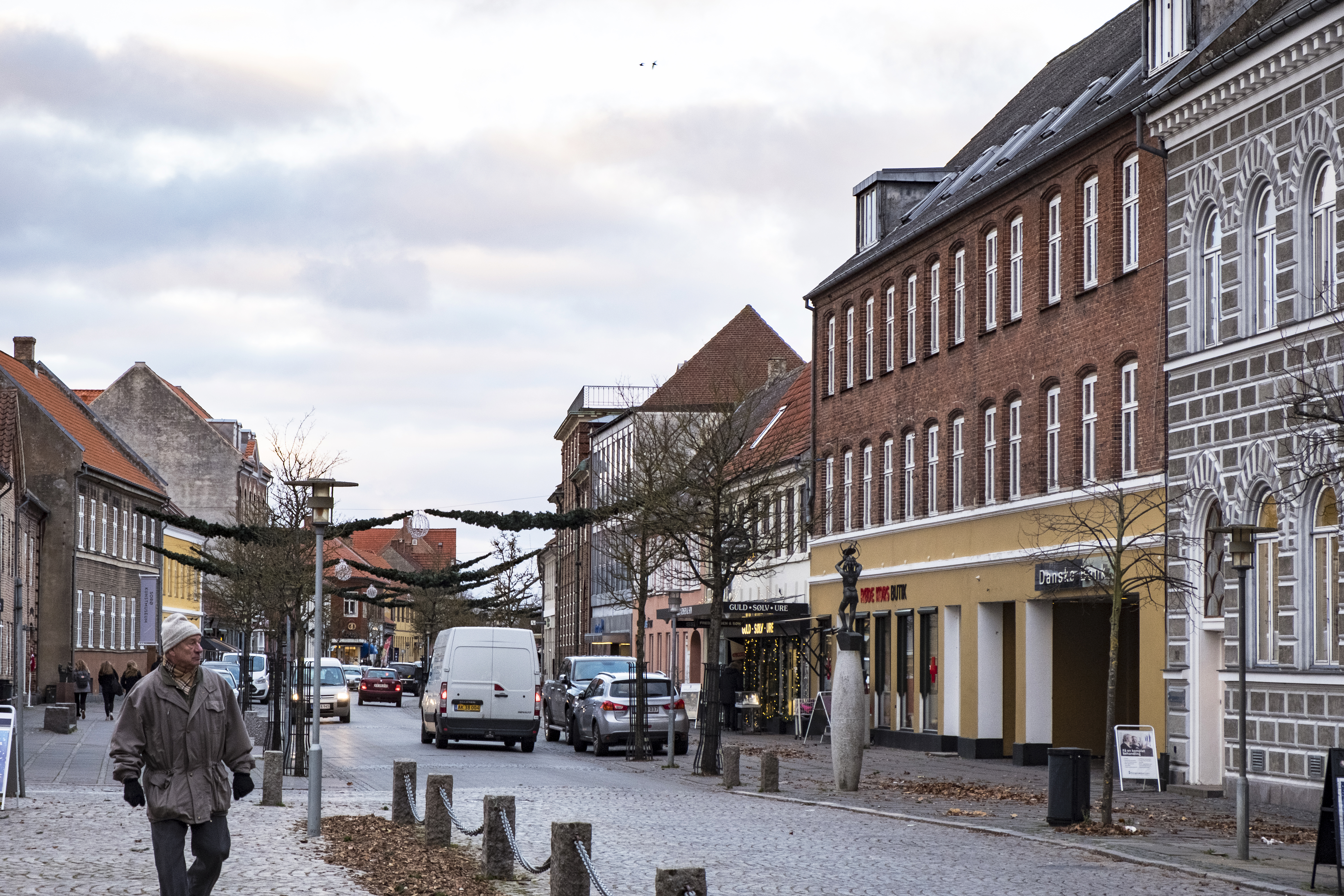
Storgade in Sorø, 2018.

== See also ==
- Sorø Museum
- Sorø Art Museum
- Sorø Academy
- Sorø Abbey
- Sorø Klosterkirke
