= 2021 Ringsted municipal election =

← 2017	16 November 2021	2025 →

All 21 seats to the Ringsted Municipal Council 11 seats needed for a majority
- Turnout: 18,273 (65.8%) ▼4.5pp
	First party	Second party	Third party
	V	C	A
Party	Venstre	Conservatives	Social Democrats
Last election	6 seats, 26.6%	3 seats, 10.6%	5 seats, 24.8%
Seats won	6	6	4
Seat change	0	▲3	▼1
Popular vote	4,649	4,487	3,761
Percentage	25.9%	25.0%	21.0%
Swing	▼0.7%	▲14.4%	▼3.8%
	Fourth party	Fifth party	Sixth party
	F	Ø	D
Party	Green Left	Red–Green Alliance	New Right
Last election	1 seat, 5.2%	2 seats, 5.4%	0 seats, 1.4%
Seats won	2	1	1
Seat change	▲1	▼1	▲1
Popular vote	1,369	1,018	770
Percentage	7.6%	5.7%	4.3%
Swing	▲2.4%	▲0.3%	▲2.9%
	Seventh party	Eighth party
	O	B
Party	Danish People's Party	Social Liberals
Last election	3 seats, 16.3%	1 seat, 4.7%
Seats won	1	0
Seat change	▼2	▼1
Popular vote	674	560
Percentage	3.8%	3.1%
Swing	▼12.5%	▼1.6%
Mayor before election
Henrik Hvidesten
Venstre
Mayor after election
Henrik Hvidesten
Venstre

The 2021 Ringsted municipal election took place in Ringsted, Denmark on 16 November 2021 to elect all 21 members of the Ringsted Municipal Council. The three elections that had been held after 2007 where the 2007 municipal reform took effect, had resulted in Venstre becoming the largest party solely and winning the mayor's position.

In 2017, Venstre won 6 seats, and Henrik Hvidesten would secure a 2nd term.

In this election, Henrik Hvidesten would seek a third term. While Venstre would once again with 6 seats with 25.9%, the Conservatives, with 25% of the vote, would also win 6 seats, marking the first time Venstre would fail to being the party that was individually the largest. Henrik Hvidesten would eventually become mayor, after a broad agreement with the Social Democrats, the Green Left and Danish People's Party was reached.

== Electoral system ==
For elections to Danish municipalities, a number varying from 9 to 31 are chosen to be elected to the municipal council. The seats are then allocated using the D'Hondt method and a closed list proportional representation. Ringsted Municipality had 21 seats in 2021

Unlike in Danish General Elections, in elections to municipal councils, electoral alliances are allowed.

== Electoral alliances ==
=== Electoral Alliance 1 ===
Party		Political alignment
C	Conservatives	Centre-right
D	New Right	Right-wing to Far-right
I	Liberal Alliance	Centre-right to Right-wing

=== Electoral Alliance 2 ===
Party		Political alignment
B	Social Liberals	Centre to Centre-left
F	Green Left	Centre-left to Left-wing
Ø	Red–Green Alliance	Left-wing to Far-Left

=== Electoral Alliance 3 ===
Party		Political alignment
K	Christian Democrats	Centre to Centre-right
O	Danish People's Party	Right-wing to Far-right
V	Venstre	Centre-right

== Results by polling station ==
Division	A	B	C	D	F	I	K	O	V	Æ	Ø
Division	%	%	%	%	%	%	%	%	%	%	%
Ringsted Nørretorv	22.4	3.9	28.0	3.5	6.7	0.5	1.3	3.0	26.0	0.3	4.4
Bringstrup	16.3	3.0	19.7	5.1	8.1	0.6	2.4	3.9	34.9	0.4	5.6
Gyrstinge	20.0	2.3	21.7	8.0	4.6	1.3	2.3	4.4	27.8	0.2	7.4
Benløse	21.9	2.2	26.0	3.9	5.4	1.0	3.3	4.1	29.5	0.1	2.6
Kværkeby	11.9	1.9	41.7	3.7	3.5	0.1	15.8	3.2	14.3	0.0	3.8
Jystrup	17.3	4.8	17.6	2.5	16.9	1.0	3.1	3.1	18.4	0.4	14.9
Ringsted Dagmarskolen	22.7	3.2	21.9	3.6	8.9	0.5	1.2	3.8	25.5	0.6	8.1
Haraldsted	16.3	2.9	22.3	4.8	11.8	2.8	2.5	4.5	21.9	0.5	9.8
Vetterslev	21.0	3.3	21.4	5.0	7.4	1.0	1.3	4.5	31.0	0.6	3.6
Sneslev	17.8	0.8	18.9	6.5	7.8	1.6	2.2	4.6	33.7	0.5	5.7
Nordrup	19.5	2.1	24.1	8.4	7.1	1.3	1.9	3.9	24.9	0.3	6.6
Vigersted	21.1	2.4	24.1	4.0	9.9	0.6	2.2	5.2	24.5	0.3	5.7
Ørslev	25.3	2.2	18.2	12.7	5.7	0.9	1.5	6.8	21.3	1.1	4.2

== Results ==
Party		Votes	%	+/-	Seats	+/-
Ringsted Municipality
V	Venstre	4,649	25.92	-0.70	6	0
C	Conservatives	4,487	25.02	+14.39	6	+3
A	Social Democrats	3,761	20.97	-3.82	4	-1
F	Green Left	1,369	7.63	+2.39	2	+1
Ø	Red-Green Alliance	1,018	5.68	+0.31	1	-1
D	New Right	770	4.29	+2.84	1	+1
O	Danish People's Party	674	3.76	-12.56	1	-2
B	Social Liberals	560	3.12	-1.53	0	-1
K	Christian Democrats	436	2.43	New	0	New
I	Liberal Alliance	144	0.80	-1.87	0	0
Æ	Freedom List	67	0.37	New	0	New
Total		17,935	100	N/A	21	N/A
Invalid votes		89	0.32	+0.21		
Blank votes		249	0.90	-0.10		
Turnout		18,273	65.81	-4.50		
Source: valg.dk
