= 2025 Ringsted municipal election =

Municipal election in Denmark

- 18 November 2025

All 21 seats to the Ringsted municipal council 11 seats needed for a majority
- Turnout: 19,437 (68.0%) ▲2.2%
	First party	Second party	Third party
	C	A	V
Party	Conservatives	Social Democrats	Venstre
Last election	6 seats, 25.0%	4 seats, 21.0%	6 seats, 25.9%
Seats won	10	4	3
Seat change	▲4	0	▼3
Popular vote	7,746	3,089	2,893
Percentage	40.5%	16.2%	15.1%
Swing	▲15.5%	▼4.8%	▼10.8%
	Fourth party	Fifth party	Sixth party
	F	Ø	O
Party	Green Left	Red-Green Alliance	Danish People's Party
Last election	2 seats, 7.6%	1 seat, 5.7%	1 seat, 3.8%
Seats won	2	1	1
Seat change	0	0	0
Popular vote	1,513	1,002	820
Percentage	7.9%	5.2%	4.3%
Swing	▲0.3%	▼0.4%	▲0.5%
	Seventh party
	D
Party	New Right
Last election	1 seat, 4.3%
Seats won	0
Seat change	▼1
Popular vote	282
Percentage	1.5%
Swing	▼2.8%
Mayor before election
Klaus Hansen
Venstre
Mayor after election
Andres Karlsen
Conservatives

The 2025 Ringsted Municipal election was held on November 18, 2025, to elect the 21 members to sit in the regional council for the Ringsted Municipal council, in the period of 2026 to 2029. Andres Karlsen from the Conservatives, would win the mayoral position.

== Background ==
Following the 2021 election, Henrik Hvidesten from Venstre became mayor for his third term. However Hvidesten stepped down as mayor on January 28, 2024, following accusations of inappropriate behavior towards female councillors. Klaus Hansen, also from Venstre, replaced him He is set to run to be elected. On August 18, 2024, 7 right-wing parties, agreed an electoral alliance, wanting to replace Hansen as mayor, with the Conservatives mayoral candidate Andreas Karlsen, which would have broken nearly 20 years of Venstre-rule in the municipality if successful. Moderates had originally intended to contest the election, but Ringsted Moderates disbanded themselves in August 2025.

== Electoral system ==
For elections to Danish municipalities, a number varying from 9 to 31 are chosen to be elected to the municipal council. The seats are then allocated using the D'Hondt method and a closed list proportional representation. Ringsted Municipality had 21 seats in 2025.

== Electoral alliances ==
=== Electoral Alliance 1 ===
Party		Political alignment
A	Social Democrats	Centre-left
B	Social Liberals	Centre to Centre-left
F	Green Left	Centre-left to Left-wing
Ø	Red-Green Alliance	Left-wing to Far-Left

=== Electoral Alliance 2 ===
Party		Political alignment
C	Conservatives	Centre-right
D	New Right	Far-right
I	Liberal Alliance	Centre-right to Right-wing
K	Christian Democrats	Centre to Centre-right
L	Landsbylisten	Local politics
O	Danish People's Party	Right-wing to Far-right
Æ	Denmark Democrats	Right-wing to Far-right

=== Electoral Alliance 3 ===
Party		Political alignment
N	Det Nære Parti	Local politics
V	Venstre	Centre-right

== Results by polling station ==
Division	A	B	C	D	F	I	K	L	N	O	V	Æ	Ø
Division	%	%	%	%	%	%	%	%	%	%	%	%	%
Ringsted Nørretorv	17.3	2.5	43.2	1.2	8.0	1.8	0.3	0.1	0.1	3.8	15.7	1.8	4.1
Bringstrup	9.9	1.3	30.3	2.3	7.8	6.9	0.6	1.7	0.4	4.8	21.9	5.7	6.3
Gyrstinge	8.1	1.3	50.2	2.1	6.5	2.3	0.2	1.5	0.0	5.0	13.3	4.4	5.2
Benløse	17.7	2.0	44.0	1.4	4.3	1.8	1.0	0.2	0.3	3.8	18.4	2.6	2.6
Haraldsted	11.7	3.1	30.2	1.8	12.9	4.1	1.7	1.4	0.1	5.9	16.6	3.9	6.6
Ringsted Dagmarskolen	18.9	2.4	37.8	1.3	9.3	2.0	0.4	0.2	0.1	4.1	13.6	2.4	7.6
Jystrup	13.3	3.1	31.2	0.6	14.5	3.2	1.2	0.7	0.2	3.4	9.0	3.1	16.4
Kværkeby	10.1	0.8	53.5	1.3	5.7	1.6	9.1	0.4	0.1	3.0	7.5	3.8	3.1
Vetterslev	24.8	1.2	35.9	1.6	6.1	3.1	0.2	0.4	0.4	5.6	13.6	4.2	3.1
Sneslev	11.7	1.8	28.8	1.6	8.1	5.5	0.3	2.3	0.5	7.8	21.6	5.5	4.7
Nordrup	9.0	1.5	48.4	3.3	5.8	2.9	0.9	2.1	0.9	4.1	13.7	2.9	4.4
Vigersted	12.5	1.7	32.1	1.6	11.1	2.6	0.3	6.9	0.0	5.4	15.0	5.2	5.7
Ørslev Kulturhus	13.6	1.4	34.3	3.1	6.8	3.3	0.2	3.3	0.0	9.6	11.0	7.7	5.6

== Results ==
Party		Votes	%	+/-	Seats	+/-
Ringsted Municipality
C	Conservatives	7,746	40.53	+15.51	10	+4
A	Social Democrats	3,089	16.16	-4.81	4	0
V	Venstre	2,893	15.14	-10.78	3	-3
F	Green Left	1,513	7.92	+0.28	2	0
Ø	Red-Green Alliance	1,002	5.24	-0.43	1	0
O	Danish People's Party	820	4.29	+0.53	1	0
Æ	Denmark Democrats	557	2.91	New	0	New
I	Liberal Alliance	452	2.37	+1.56	0	0
B	Social Liberals	414	2.17	-0.96	0	0
D	New Right	282	1.48	-2.82	0	-1
K	Christian Democrats	165	0.86	-1.57	0	0
L	Landsbylisten	144	0.75	New	0	New
N	Det Nære Parti	35	0.18	New	0	New
Total		19,112	100	N/A	21	N/A
Invalid votes		42	0.15	-0.17		
Blank votes		283	0.99	+0.15		
Turnout		19,437	67.97	+2.16		
Source: valg.dk

== Opinion polls ==
Polling firm	Fieldwork date	Sample size	V	C	A	F	Ø	D	O	B	K	I	L	N	Æ	Others	Lead
Epinion	4 Sep - 13 Oct 2025	463	15.1	32.7	17.1	10.1	5.1	–	6.2	1.9	–	3.0	–	–	6.6	2.0	15.6
2024 european parliament election	9 Jun 2024		15.4	12.2	15.3	16.1	5.1	–	7.9	4.9	–	6.8	–	–	7.8	–	0.7
2022 general election	1 Nov 2022		12.7	8.4	27.4	9.5	3.5	4.3	3.4	2.5	0.3	6.2	–	–	7.9	–	14.7
2021 regional election	16 Nov 2021		20.2	20.2	28.8	6.6	6.6	5.0	4.3	2.7	2.9	1.3	–	–	–	–	8.6
2021 municipal election	16 Nov 2021		25.9 (6)	25.0 (6)	21.0 (4)	7.6 (2)	5.7 (1)	4.3 (1)	3.8 (1)	3.1 (0)	2.4 (0)	0.8 (0)	–	–	–	–	0.9
