= Listed buildings in Ringsted Municipality =

This is a list of buildings in Ringsted Municipality, Denmark.

== The list ==
=== 4100 Ringsted ===
Listing name	Image	Location	Year of Construction	Description
Mahler House		Sct Bendtsgade 5, 4100 Ringsted	1860s	The Mahler house was built in the 1860s.
Ringsted Town Hall		Sct Bendtsgade 1, 4100 Ringsted	1937/62	Town hall from 1937 designed by Steen Eiler Rasmussen and an extension from 1962 by the same architect as well as the near surroundings with the sculpture Valdemar The Great from 1937 by Johannes Bjerg.
Sigerstedvej 109		Sigerstedvej 109, 4100 Ringsted	c. 1830	Half-timbered house from c. 1830.
Vigersted Kirkelade		Vigersted Bygade 33, 4100 Ringsted		The space in front of Vigersted Church, the oldest parts of which dates from the Middle Ages.

=== 4174 Jystrup Midtsj ===
Listing name	Image	Location	Year of Construction	Description
Bell-Ringer's House		Valsømaglevej 134, 4174 Jystrup Midtsj	18th century	Three-winged, half-timbered house from the beginning of the 18th century located just southeast of Valsålille Church.
Bell-Ringer's House		Valsømaglevej 134, 4174 Jystrup Midtsj		
Laurentziuslund		Skjoldenæsvej 136, 4174 Jystrup Midtsj	c. 1820	Four-winged. half-timbered farmhouse from c. 1820 as well as the surrounding paving.
Laurentziuslund		Skjoldenæsvej 136, 4174 Jystrup Midtsj		
Laurentziuslund		Skjoldenæsvej 136, 4174 Jystrup Midtsj		
Laurentziuslund		Skjoldenæsvej 136, 4174 Jystrup Midtsj		
Skjoldenæsholm		Skjoldenæsvej 106, 4174 Jystrup Midtsj	c. 1776/1763	Main wing from c. 1763, possibly designed by Philip de Lange in 1803 and later; the two other wings from c. 1665, adapted.
Skjoldenæsholm		Skjoldenæsvej 106, 4174 Jystrup Midtsj		East wing.
Skjoldenæsholm		Skjoldenæsvej 106, 4174 Jystrup Midtsj		One-storey, half-timbered northeast wing
Skjoldenæsholm		Skjoldenæsvej 106, 4174 Jystrup Midtsj		West wing.

== See also ==
- List of churches in Ringsted Municipality
