= List of churches in Ringsted Municipality =

This list of churches in Ringsted Municipality lists church buildings in Ringsted Municipality, Denmark.

== List ==
Name	Location	Year	Coordinates	Image	Refs
Allindemagle Church	Allindemagle				
Benløse Church	Benløse	c. 1250	55°28′11.64″N 11°48′22.32″E		
St. Bendt's Church	Ringsted	1170	55°26′43.6″N 11°47′13.8″E		
Bringstrup Church	Bringstrup				
Farendløse Church	Farendløse				
Gyrstinge Church	Gyrstinge				
Haraldsted Church	Haraldsted				
Høm Church	Høm				
Jystrup Church	Jystrup	c. 1250	55°30′56.6″N 11°52′4.4″E		
Klostermark Church	Ringsted		55°07′8.4″N 12°14′17.6″E		
Kværkeby Church	Kværkeby				
Nordrup Church	Nordrup	12th century	55°24′33.3″N 11°53′24.9″E		
Sigersted Church	Sneslev				
Sneslev Church	Villingerød				
Valsølille Church	Valsølille				
Vesterslev Church	Vesterslev				
Vigersted Church	Vigersted				
Østerslev Church	Østerslev				

== See also ==
- Listed buildings in Ringsted Municipality
- List of churches in Sorø Municipality
