= Ørslev =

Ørslev may refer to:

- Ørslev (Ringsted Municipality)
- Ørslev (Vordingborg Municipality)
