= Edith von Bonsdorff =

Danish-Finnish dancer

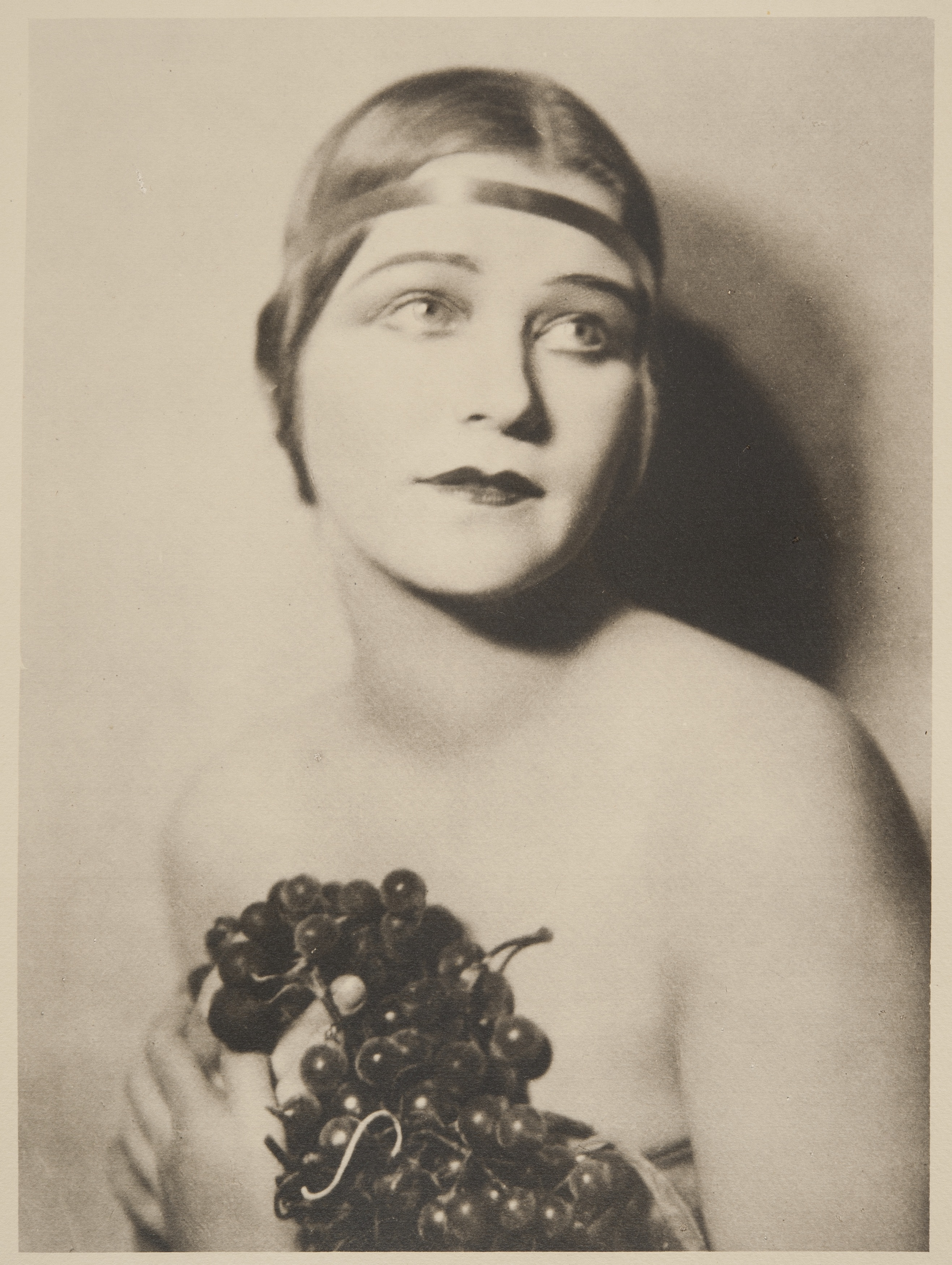
- Von Bonsdorff in the 1910s
- Born: Edith Helena Anderson; 24 April 1890; Ringsted, Zealand; Kingdom of Denmark
- Died: 19 April 1968 (aged 77)
- Noble family: Bonsdorff
- Spouse: Per Adolf von Bonsdorff
- Occupation: dancer, choreographer

Edith Helena von Bonsdorff (née Anderson; 24 April 1890 – 19 April 1968) was a Danish-Finnish ballet dancer and choreographer.

== Biography ==
Edith von Bonsdorff was born Edith Anderson on 24 April 1890 in Ringsted, Kingdom of Denmark.

In 1909 she married Per Adolf von Bonsdorff, a professor of dentistry at the University of Helsinki who was a member of the Swedish and Finnish nobility.

She made her debut as a dancer in Finland in 1919 with Swedish dancer and choreographer Jean Börlin. She performed in theatres in Helsinki and went on a performance tour in 1925 with Kaarlo Eros. In the 1920s she danced with the Ballets Russes. While in Paris, she danced in Francis Picabia's libretto-based avant-garde ballet Relâche. In 1926 she was a guest artist with the Finnish National Ballet. She choreographed for the Salome Ballet and the National Ballet in the 1950s.

In 1931 she appeared in Yrjö Nyberg's film Say it in Finnish.

In 1961 she was awarded the Pro Finlandia Medal of the Order of the Lion of Finland for her contributions to the arts.

== Gallery ==
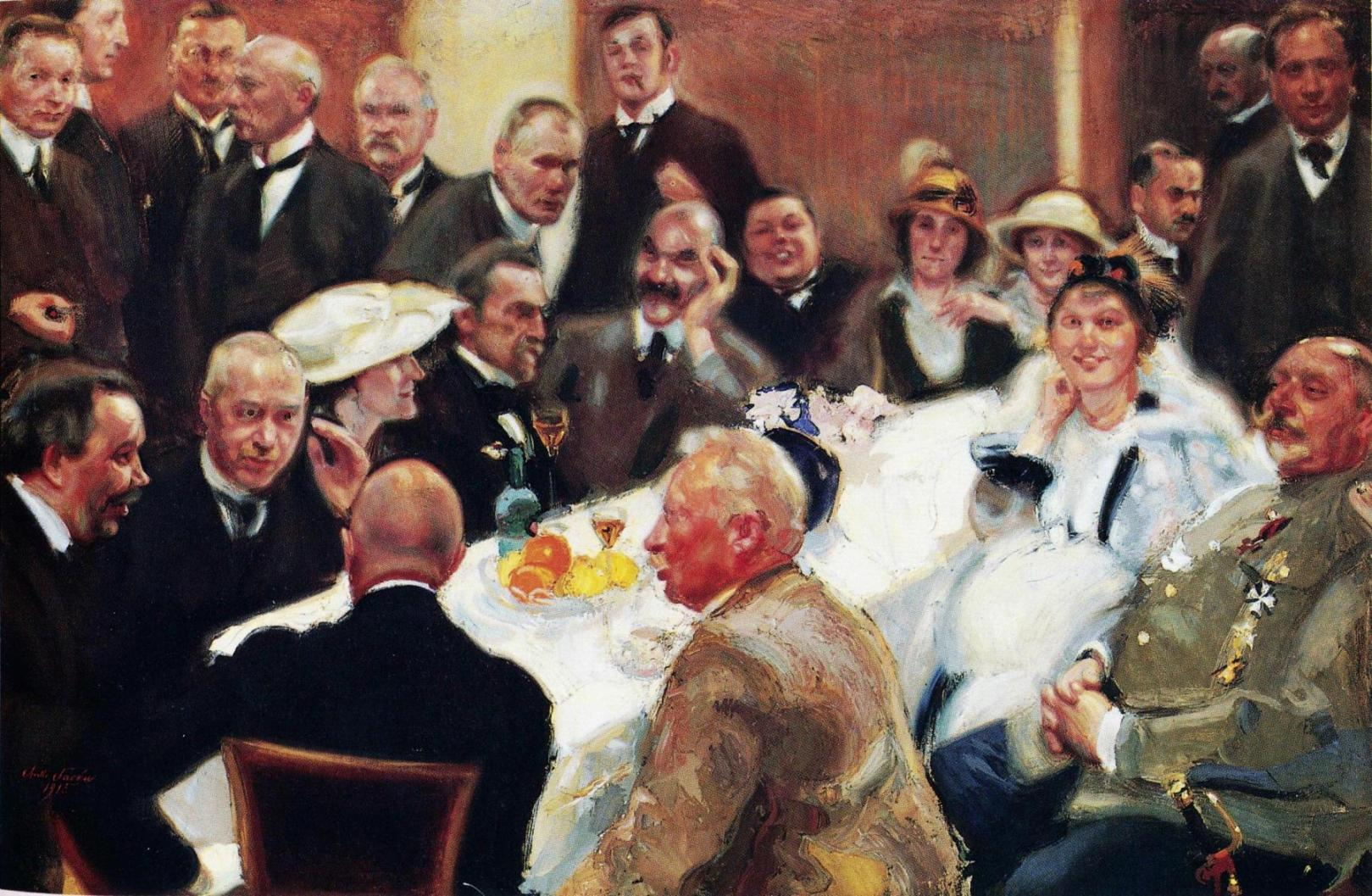
On the right at Akseli Gallen-Kallela's 50th birthday party, painting by Antti Favén, 1915

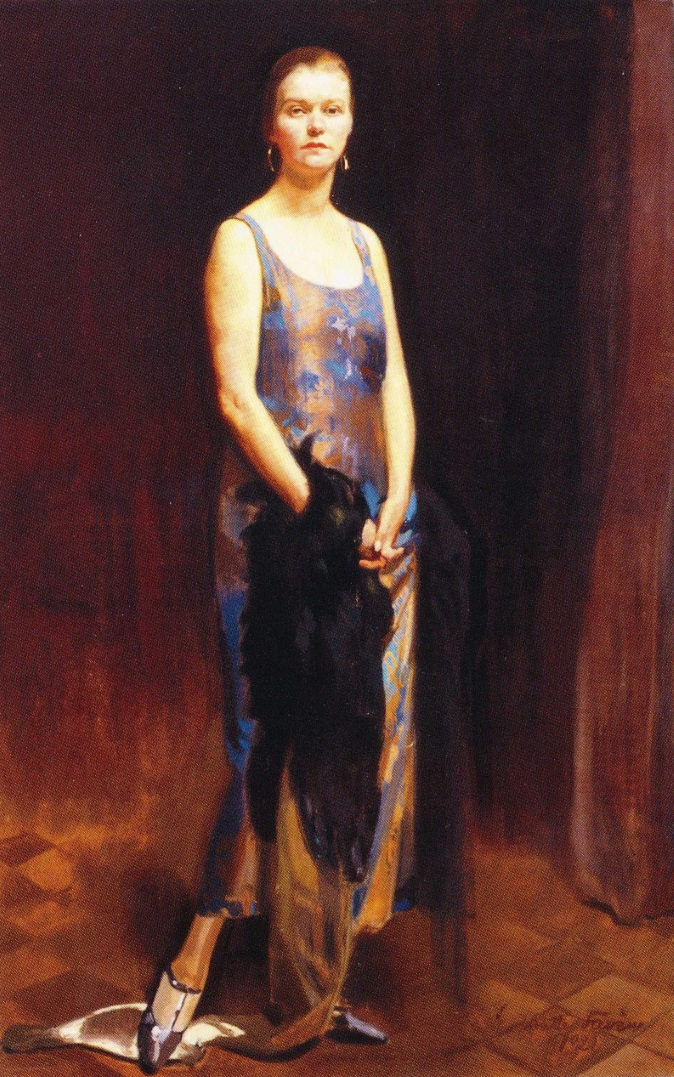
Portrait by Antti Favén, 1921
