= Ortved =

Village in Ringsted Municipality, Denmark

Coordinates: 55°29′N 11°51′E

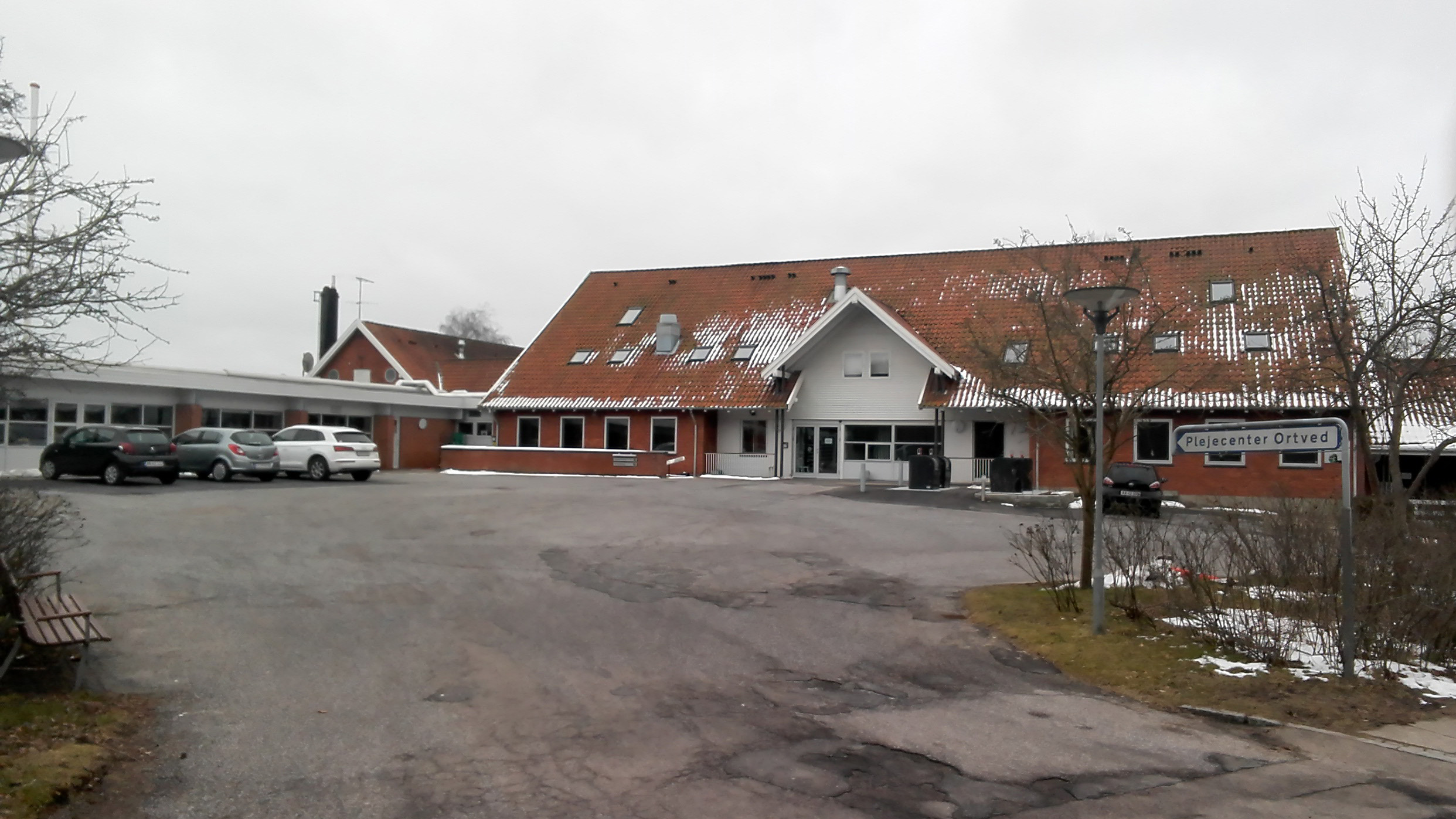
Ortved Healthcare Center

Ortved is a small village with a population of only 240 (1 January 2026) in Ringsted Municipality in the central part of the island of Zealand, Denmark, and is a part of region Sjælland. It lies on Roskildevejen main road close to the city of Ringsted. Ortved is also the village with Denmark's 5th most popular camping.
