= Vigersted =

- Village
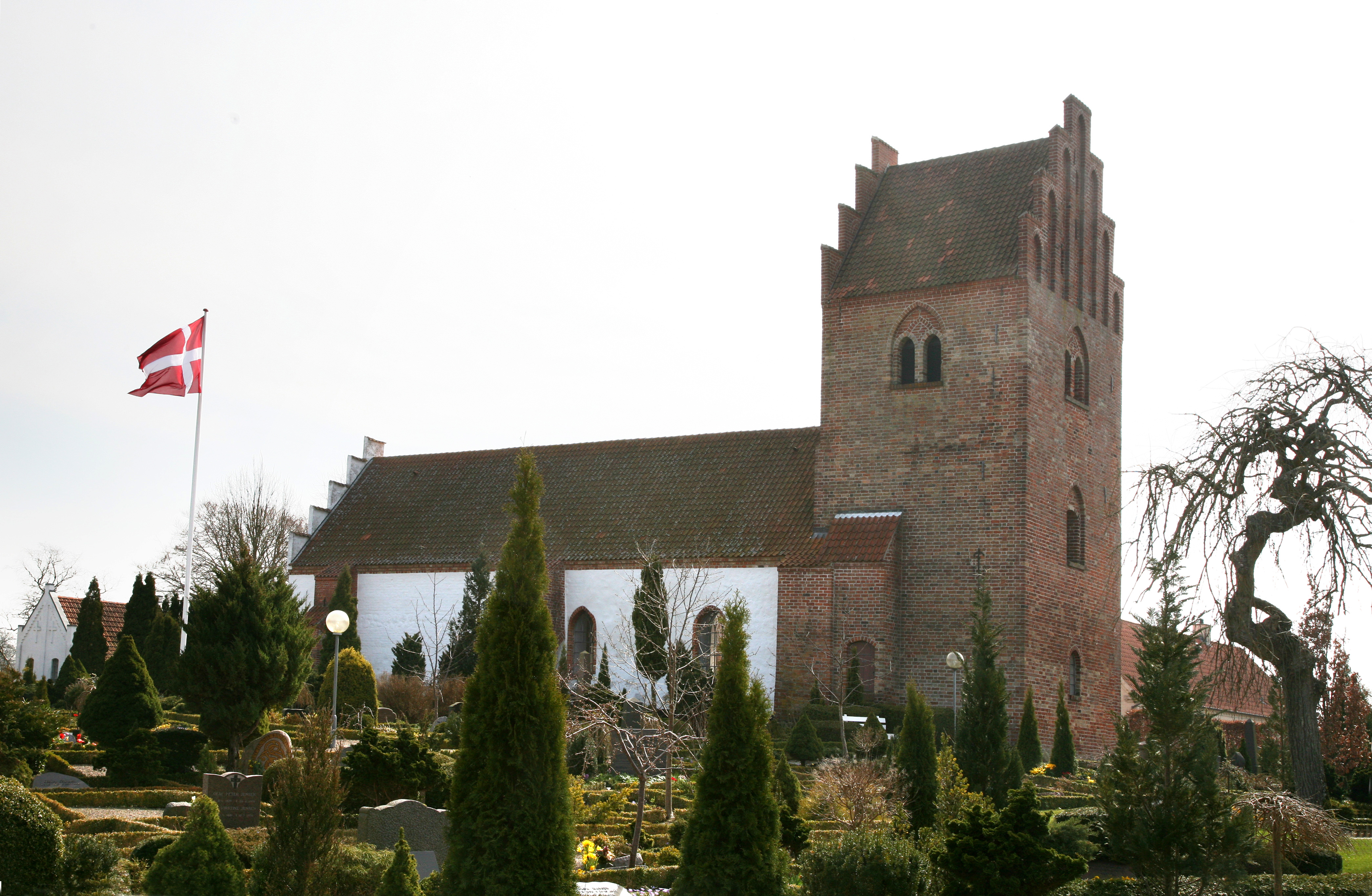
- Vigersted Church

- Location in Region Zealand Vigersted (Denmark)
- Coordinates: 55°29′2″N 11°53′2″E
- Country: Denmark
- Region: Region Zealand
- Municipality: Ringsted Municipality

Population (2026)
  - Total: 550

Vigersted is a village, with a population of 550 (1 January 2026), in Ringsted Municipality, Region Zealand in Denmark. It is located 3 km southeast of Ortved and 9 km northeast of Ringsted.

Vigersted Church is located in the village.
