= Skjoldenæsholm Tram Museum =

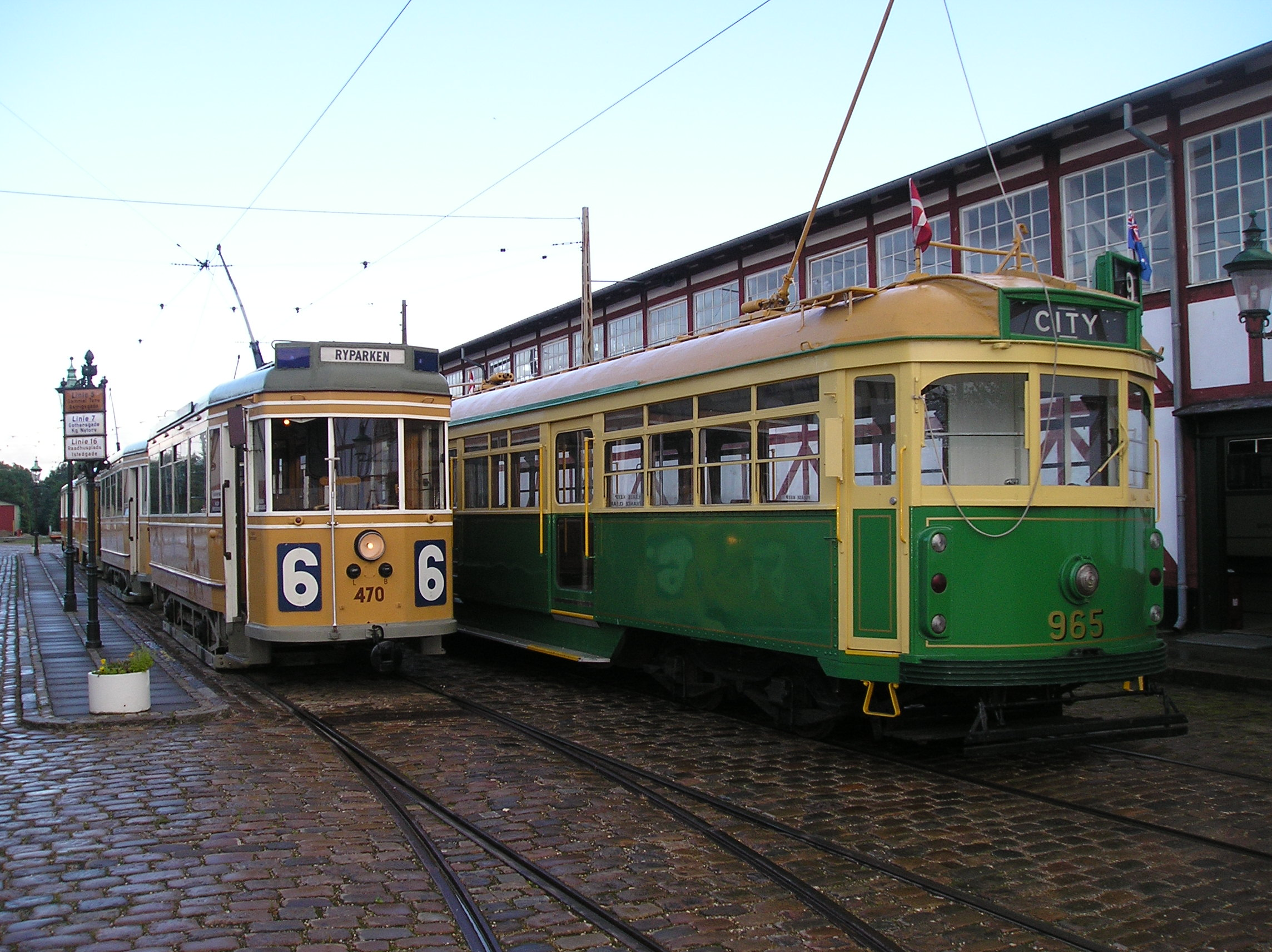
- Trams from Copenhagen and Melbourne
- Established: 1978
- Location: Ringsted, Denmark
- Coordinates: 55.5334°N 11.8448°E
- Type: Transport museum
- Website: www.sporvejsmuseet.dk (english)

Skjoldenæsholm Tram Museum (Danish: Sporvejsmuseet Skjoldenæsholm^{da}), also referred to as the Danish Tramway Museum, is an open-air museum dedicated to vintage trams and buses. Preserved railways^{da}. It is located 65 km (40 mi) south-west of Copenhagen, Denmark, between Ringsted and Roskilde.

The museum opened on land which belongs to Skjoldenæsholm Castle on 26 May 1978. It was established and is run entirely by unpaid volunteers in collaboration with the Danish Tram Historical Society.

The museum is founded on some of the remains of Sjællandske Midtbane, a railway that was closed in 1936 and went from Næstved to Frederikssund via Ringsted and Hvalsø.

The museum's goal is to preserve and restore trams (and now also buses and trolleybuses) in running condition: Right from the inaugural meeting, the idea of preserving and restoring the fast-disappearing trams was conceived, so that future generations might be able to see and experience the old trams.

== Collection ==
The collection was founded in 1965, Sporvejshistorisk Selskab. It consists mainly of rolling stock and related artifacts from Copenhagen, Aarhus and Odense, the three Danish cities which historically operated tram systems, but also includes trams from a number of other countries.Sporvejsmuseet Skjoldenæsholms sporvogne og busser

In 2003 the museum took over a collection of historic trams and buses when a museum run by HT (Hovedstadens Trafikselskab), the local bus company in Copenhagen, closed. Several other collections have followed since. Sporvejsmuseet Skjoldenæsholms historie

Bornholms Sporvognstrafik B/S, Østermarie, Bornholm

The workshop of the tram museum in Ringsted, Zealand and the workshop of the tram museum in Østermarie, Bornholm. Electric, Accumulator (storage battery), Diesel, Oil, Steam and Horse. Horse-drawn tram/Horse-drawn streetcar/Horse-drawn railway/Heritage tram/Heritage streetcar/Tram/Light rail/Tram-train/Heritage tramway/Translohr/Interurban/Double-decker tram/W-class Melbourne tram, Horsecar, Horse trams, Buses and Trolleybus, Stadler Variobahn, Low-floor tram, Stadler Variobahn, Stadler Tango, Stadler Rail, Alstom Citadis, Flexity Classic, Siemens Avenio, ADtranz low floor tram, Siemens Combino, Types of trams.

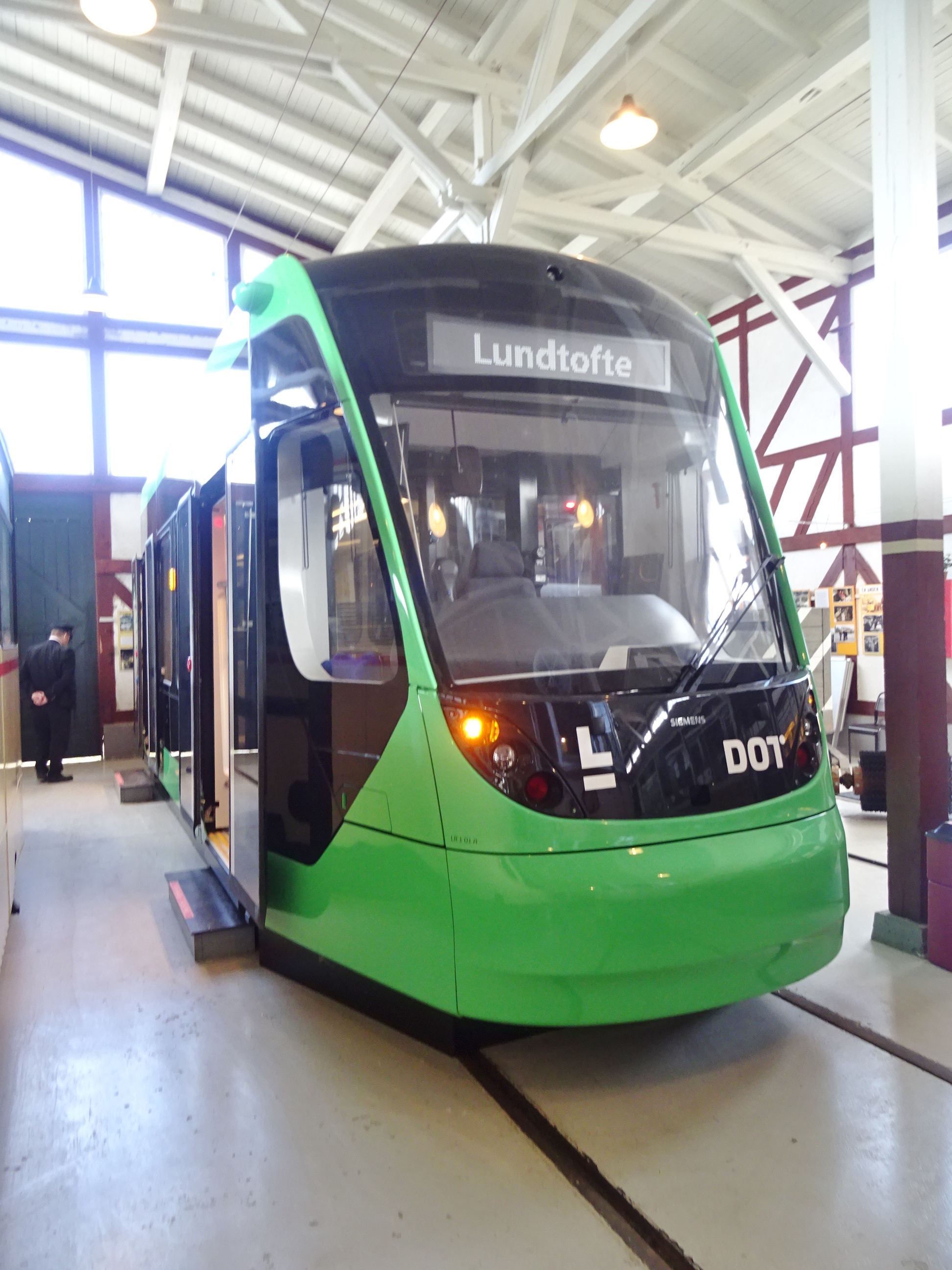
Greater Copenhagen Light Rail trams at Skjoldenæsholm Tram Museum

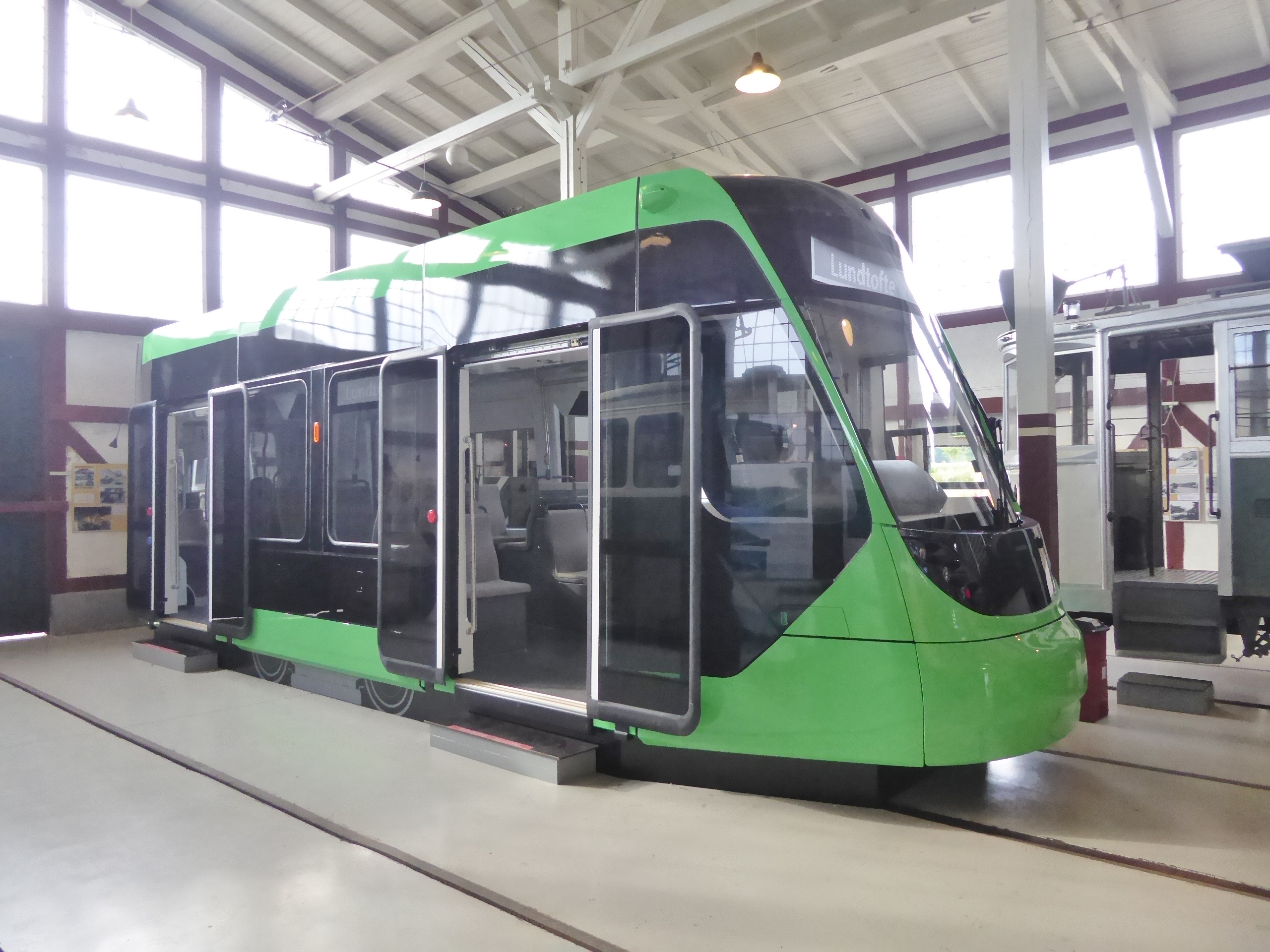

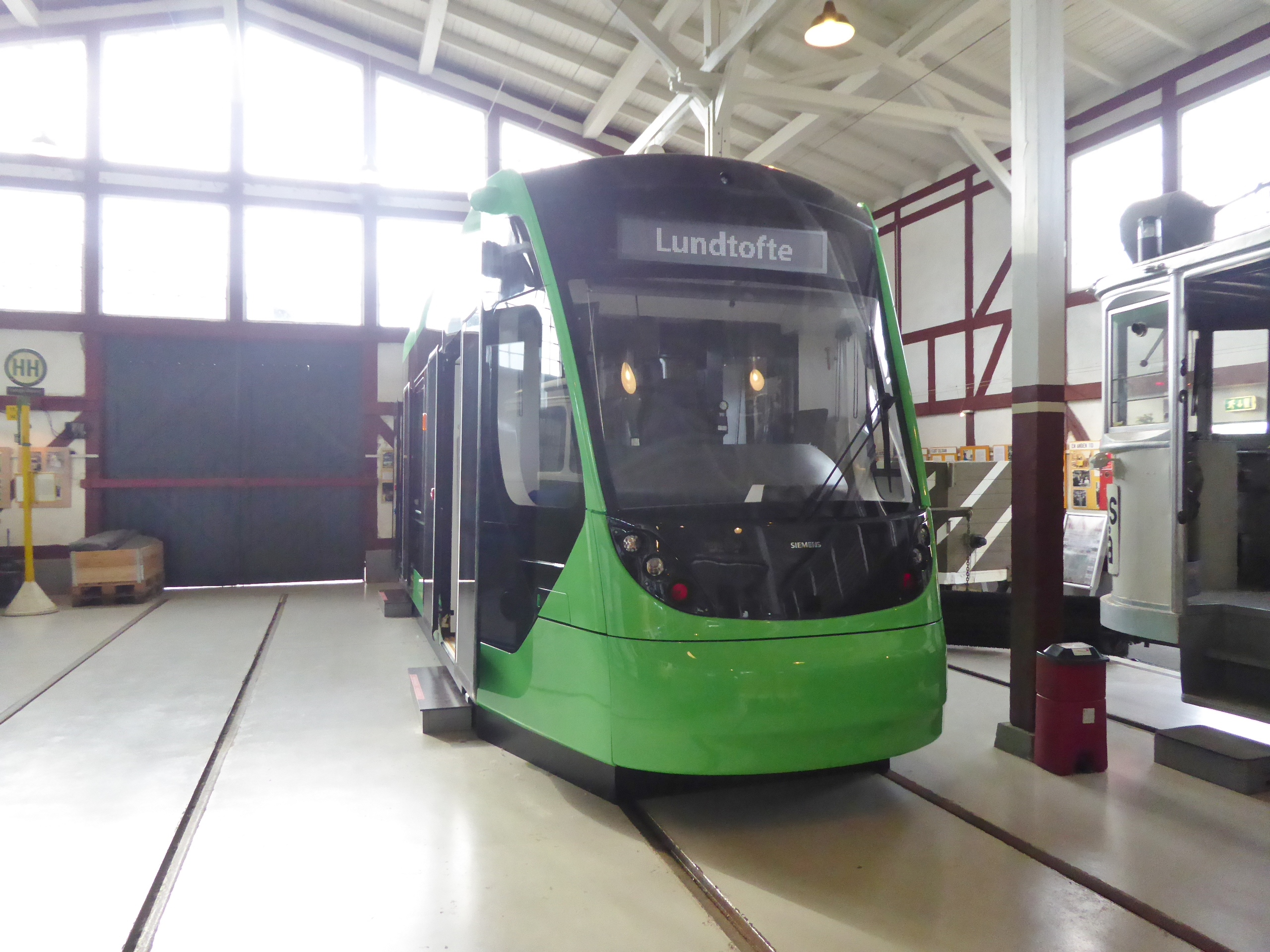

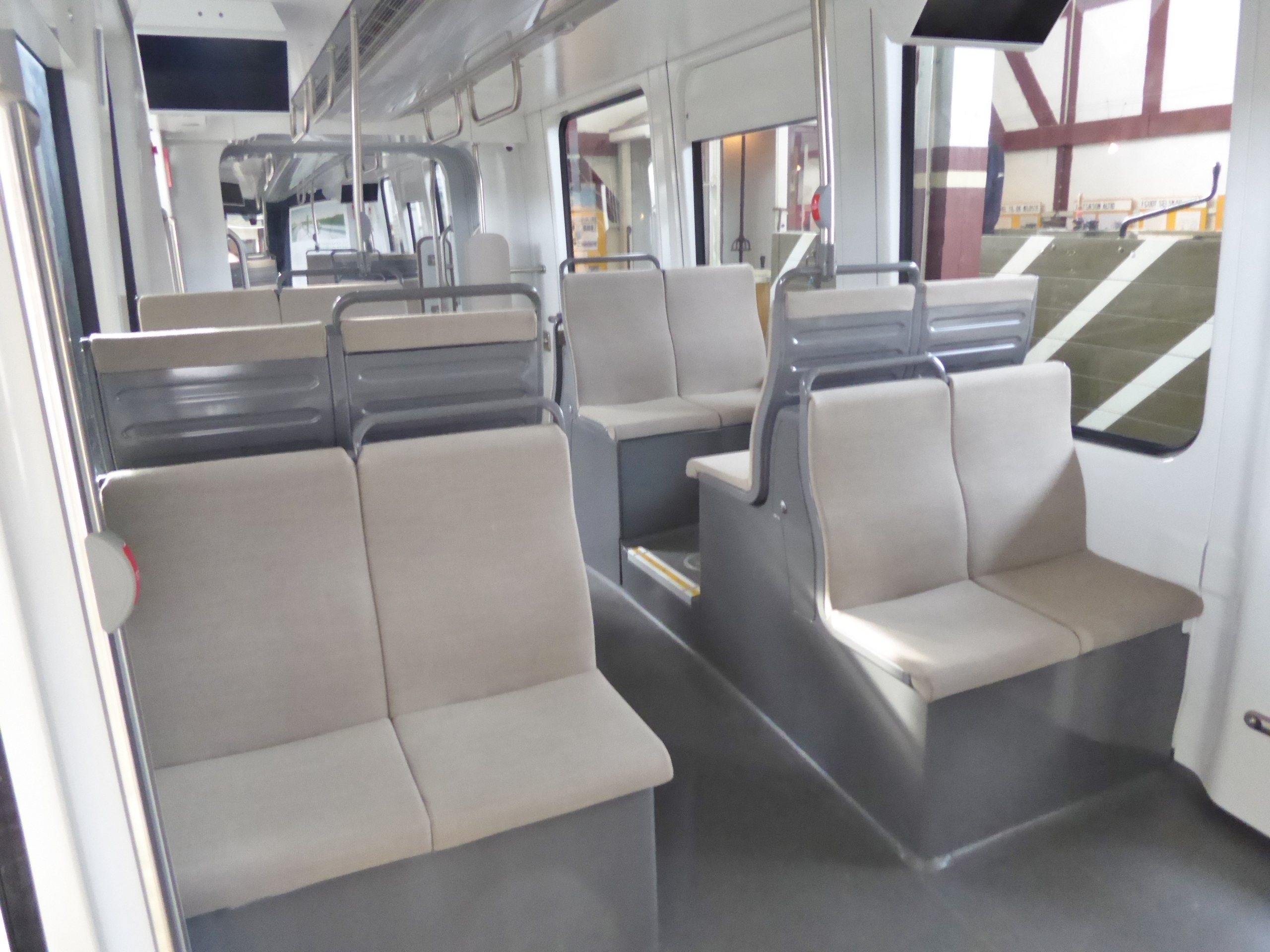

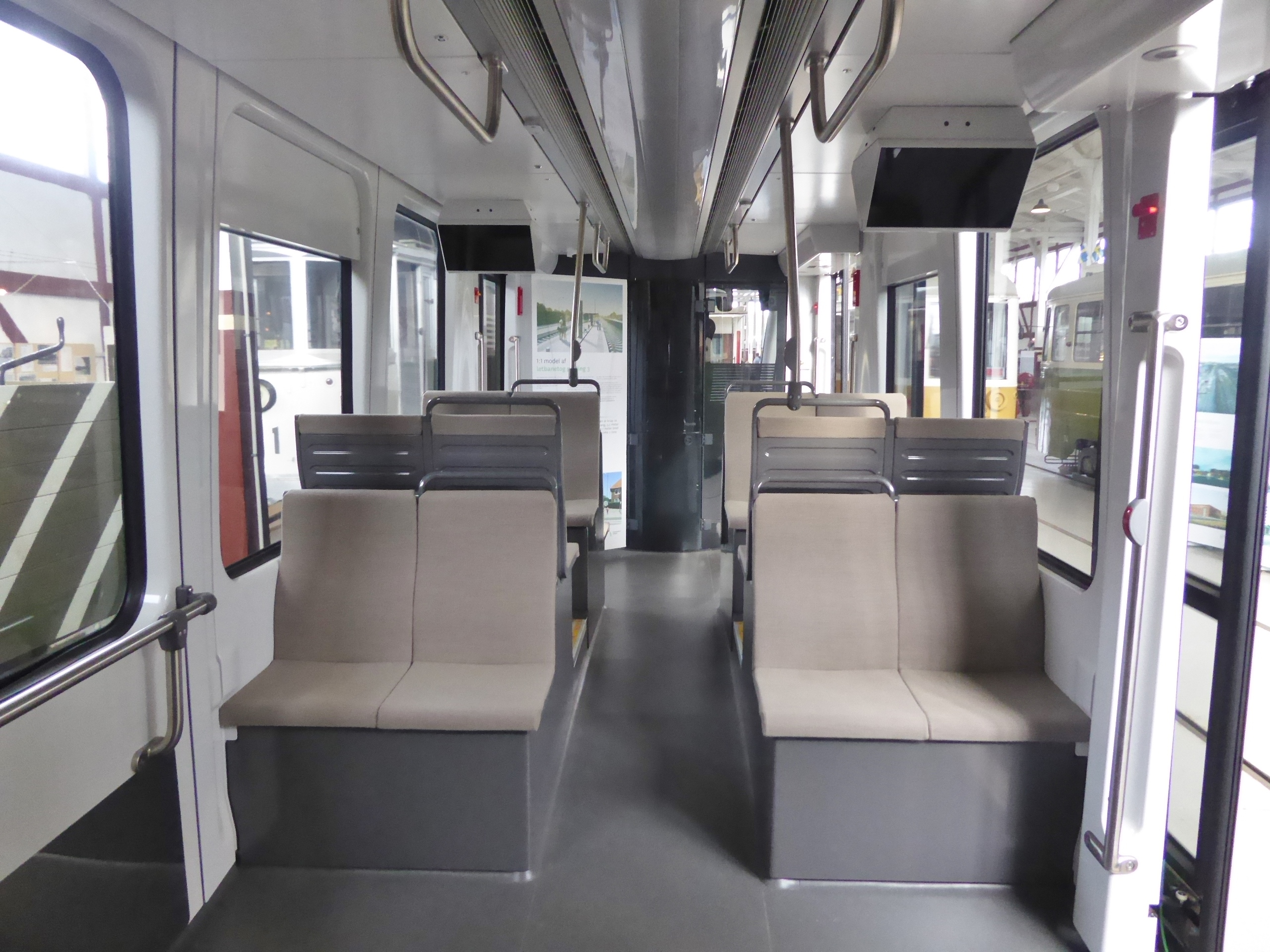

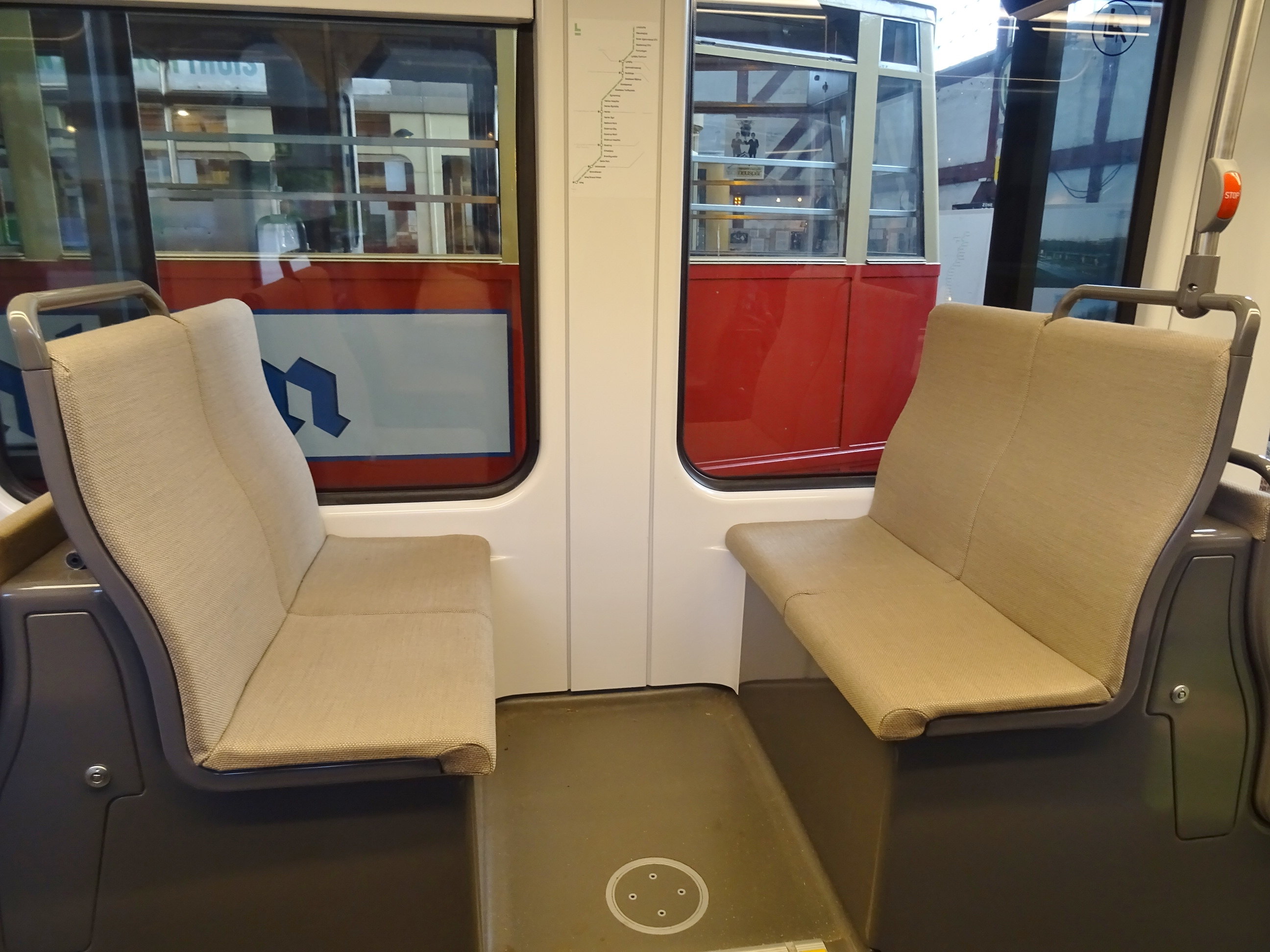

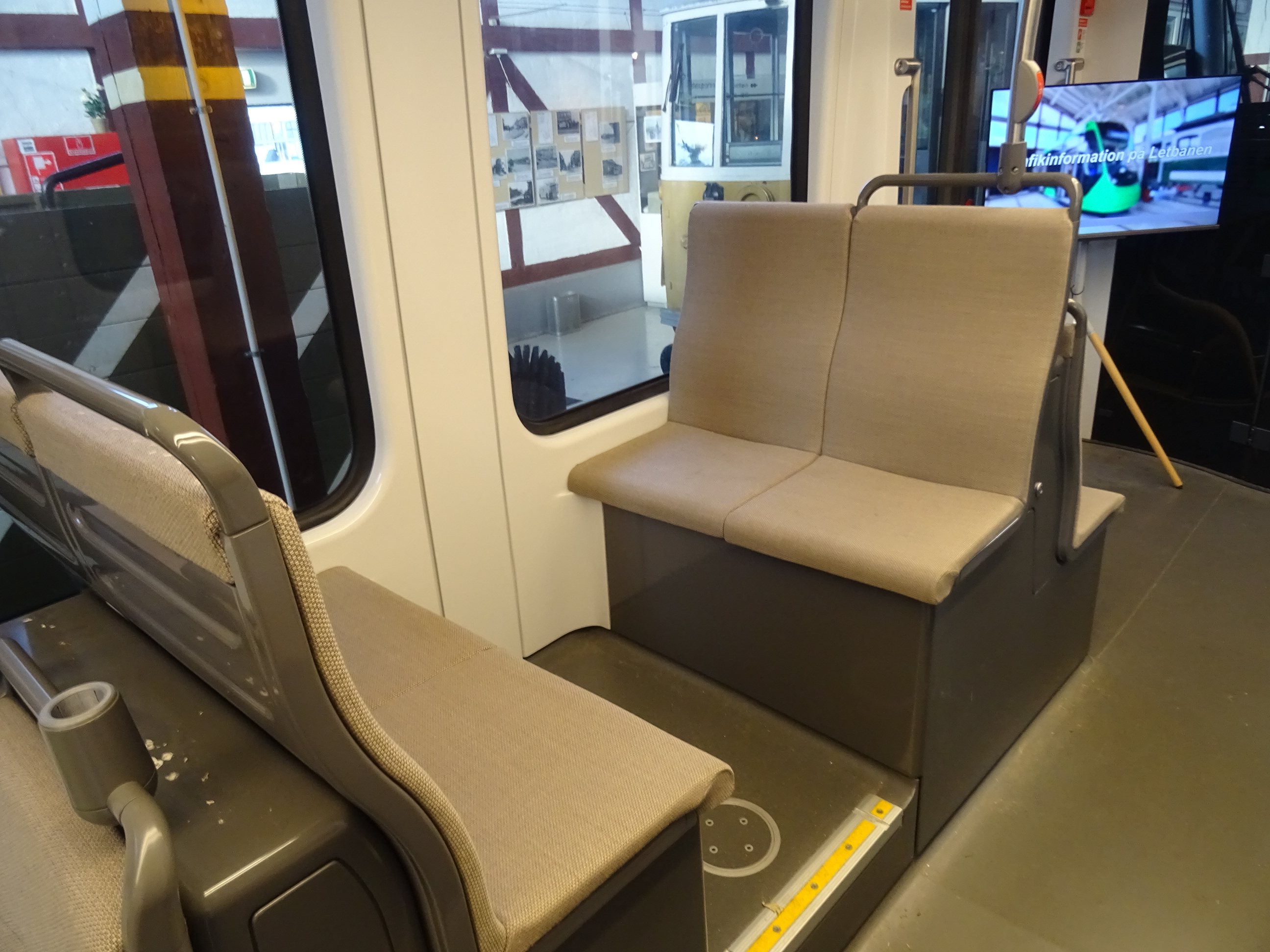

== Tram lines ==
The museum has two tramways. A 300-metre (984 ft) 1,000 mm (3 ft 3 3/8 in) metre gauge tramway is used for rolling stock from Aarhus, Flensburg and Basel. An app. 1.5 km (0.93 mi) 1,435 mm (4 ft 8 1/2 in) standard gauge tramway is used for trams from Copenhagen, Odense, Malmö, Oslo, Prague, Düsseldorf, Rostock, Hamburg, den Haag and Melbourne. And wagons from Bornholm Railways De Bornholmske Jernbaner

On selected days, vintage buses from Copenhagen, Aarhus and Odense are operated on a circular tour.

== See also ==
- List of town tramway systems in Denmark
