= Kværkeby =

- Village
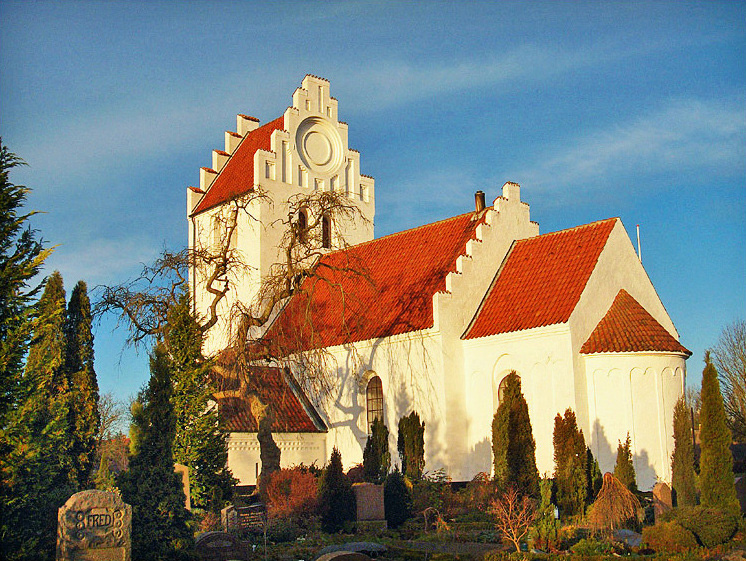
- Kværkeby Church

- Location in Denmark Kværkeby (Denmark)
- Coordinates: 55°27′45″N 11°52′24″E
- Country: Denmark
- Region: Region Zealand
- Municipality: Ringsted Municipality

Population (2026)
  - Total: 597

Kværkeby is a village, with a population of 597 (1 January 2026), in Ringsted Municipality, Region Zealand in Denmark. It is located 6 km east of Ringsted and 22 km west of Køge.

Kværkeby Church is located in the village. The manor house Rosengaard is located 250 metres east of the Church.

Kværkeby was served by Kværkeby railway station between 1900 and 1974. The station was located in the nearby village of Fjællebro on the railway line between Roskilde and Ringsted.
