= Jystrup =

- Town
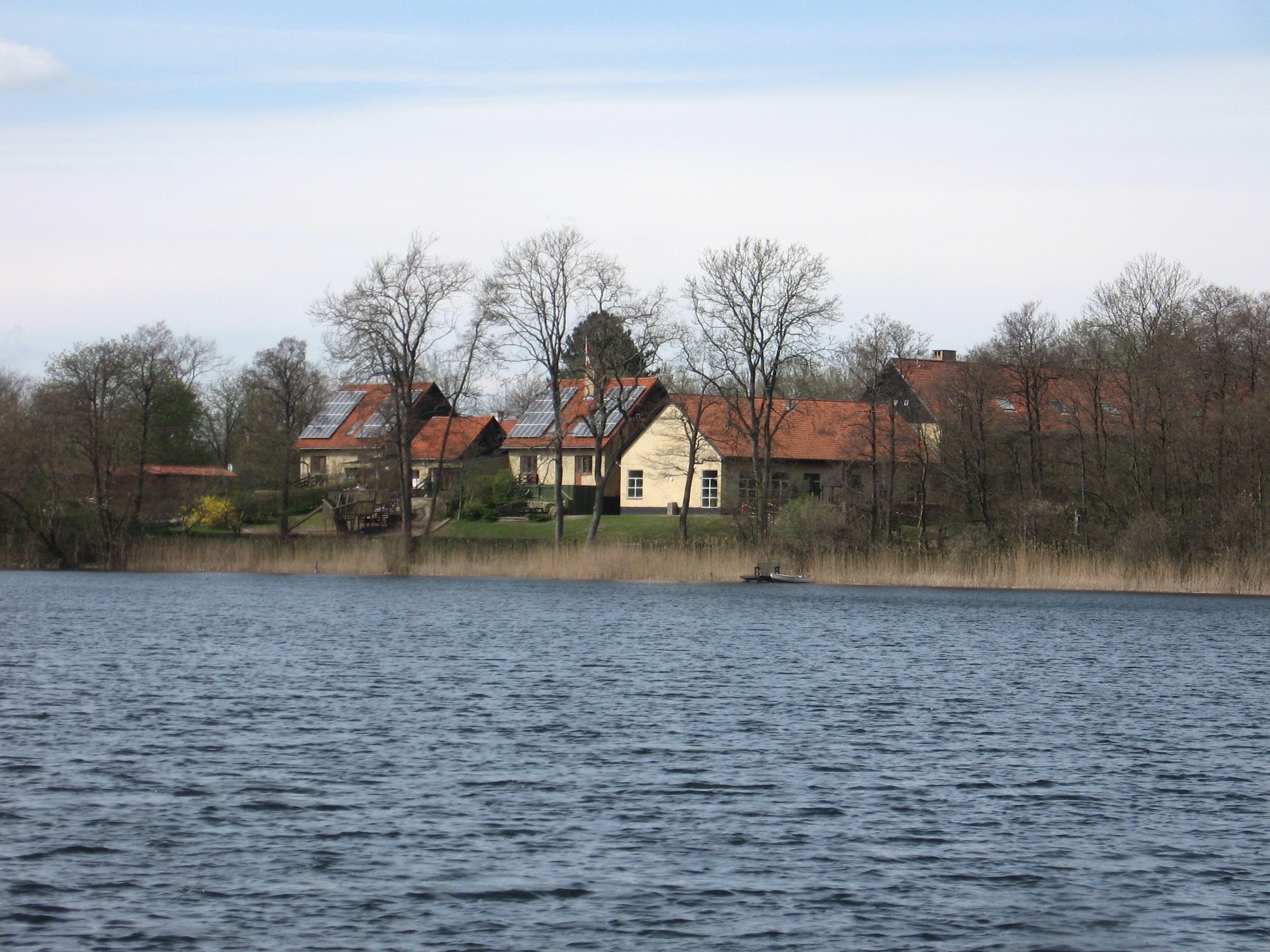

- Location in Region Zealand Jystrup (Denmark)
- Coordinates: 55.51571°N 11.86695°E
- Country: Denmark
- Region: Region Zealand
- Municipality: Ringsted Municipality

Population (2026)
  - Total: 853
- Time zone: UTC+1 (CET)
  - Summer (DST): UTC+2 (CEST)
- Postal code: DK-4174 Jystrup Midtsjælland

Jystrup is a small town with a population of 853 (1 January 2026) located in the middle of Zealand, Denmark. It is located in Ringsted municipality in Region Zealand.

Known for its nearby Danish Tramway Museum of Skjoldenæsholm, the town is also close to a camping site.

== Notable people ==
- Per Gundmann (1906 in Jystrup – 1967) a Danish stage and film actor
