= List of churches in Sorø Municipality =

This list of churches in Sorø Municipality lists church buildings in Sorø Municipality, Denmark.

== List ==
Name	Location	Year	Coordinates	Image	Refs
Alsted Church	Alsted				
Bjernede Church	Bjernede	1170	55°27′43.5″N 11°37′29.9″E		
Bromme Church	Bromme	c. 1100	55°28′58.79″N 11°30′36.71″E		
Filadelfia's Church		1904	55°31′46″N 11°30′15″E		
Filadelfia's Forest Chapel		1973	55°31′50.5″N 11°30′41.5″E		
Fjenneslev Church	Fjenneslev	1130	55°26′01″N 11°41′15″E		
Flinterup Church	Flinterup	c. 1100	55°30′1.71″N 11°37′33.49″E		
Lynge Church	Lynge	c. 1100	55°28′58.56″N 11°33′52.56″E		
Munke Bjergby Church	Munke Bjergby				
Niløse Church	Noløse				
Pedersborg Church	Pedersborg	12th century	55°27′5.8″N 11°33′21″E		
Ruds Vedby Church	Ruds Vedby	c. 1100	55°32′30.11″N 11°22′32.84″E		
Skellebjerg Church	Skellebjerg				
Slaglille Church	Slaglille				
Sorø Abbey Church	Sorø	1161	55°25′48.6″N 11°33′24.3″E		
Stenlille Church	Stenlille				
Stenmagle Church	Stenmagle				
Terløse Church	Terløse				
Vester Broby Church	Vester Broby	1161	55°22′48.7″N 11°37′15.1″E		

== See also ==
- Listed buildings in Sorø Municipality
