= Vetterslev =

- Village
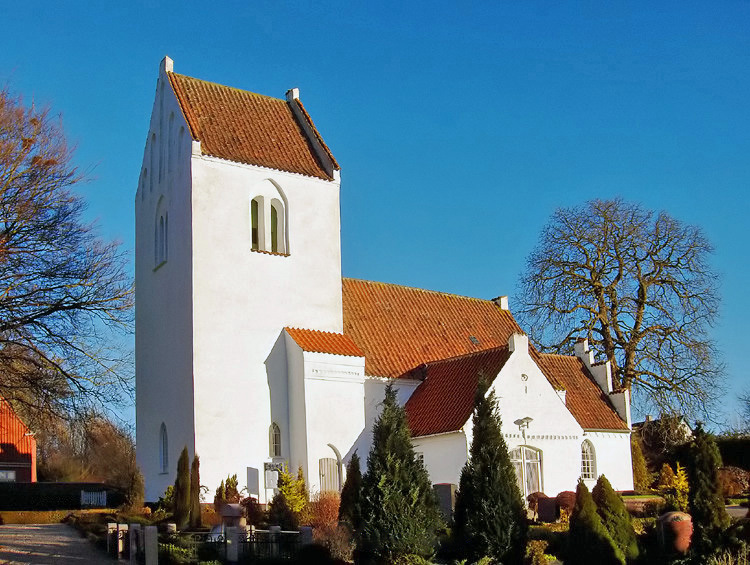
- Vetterslev Church

- Location in Region Zealand Vetterslev (Denmark)
- Coordinates: 55.38821°N 11.76833°E
- Country: Denmark
- Region: Region Zealand
- Municipality: Ringsted Municipality

Population (2026)
  - Total: 665

Vetterslev is a village, with a population of 665 (1 January 2026), in Ringsted Municipality, Region Zealand in Denmark. It is located 7 km south of Ringsted and 20 km north of Næstved.

Vetterslev Church is located in the village.
