= Ørslev, Ringsted =

Ørslev
- Village
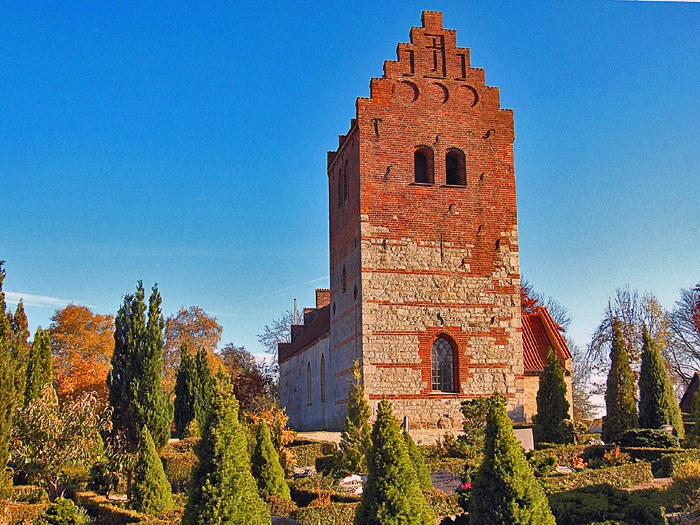
- Ørslev Church

- Location in Region Zealand Ørslev (Denmark)
- Coordinates: 55.38622°N 11.93625°E
- Country: Denmark
- Region: Region Zealand
- Municipality: Ringsted Municipality

Population (2026)
  - Total: 677

Ørslev is a village, with a population of 677 (1 January 2026), in Ringsted Municipality, Region Zealand in Denmark. It is located 9 km north of Haslev, 23 km southwest of Køge and 14 km southeast of Ringsted.

Ørslev Church is located in the village.
