= Skjoldenæsholm =

Manor house in Denmark

Skjoldenæsholm Castle
- Skjoldnæsholm Slot
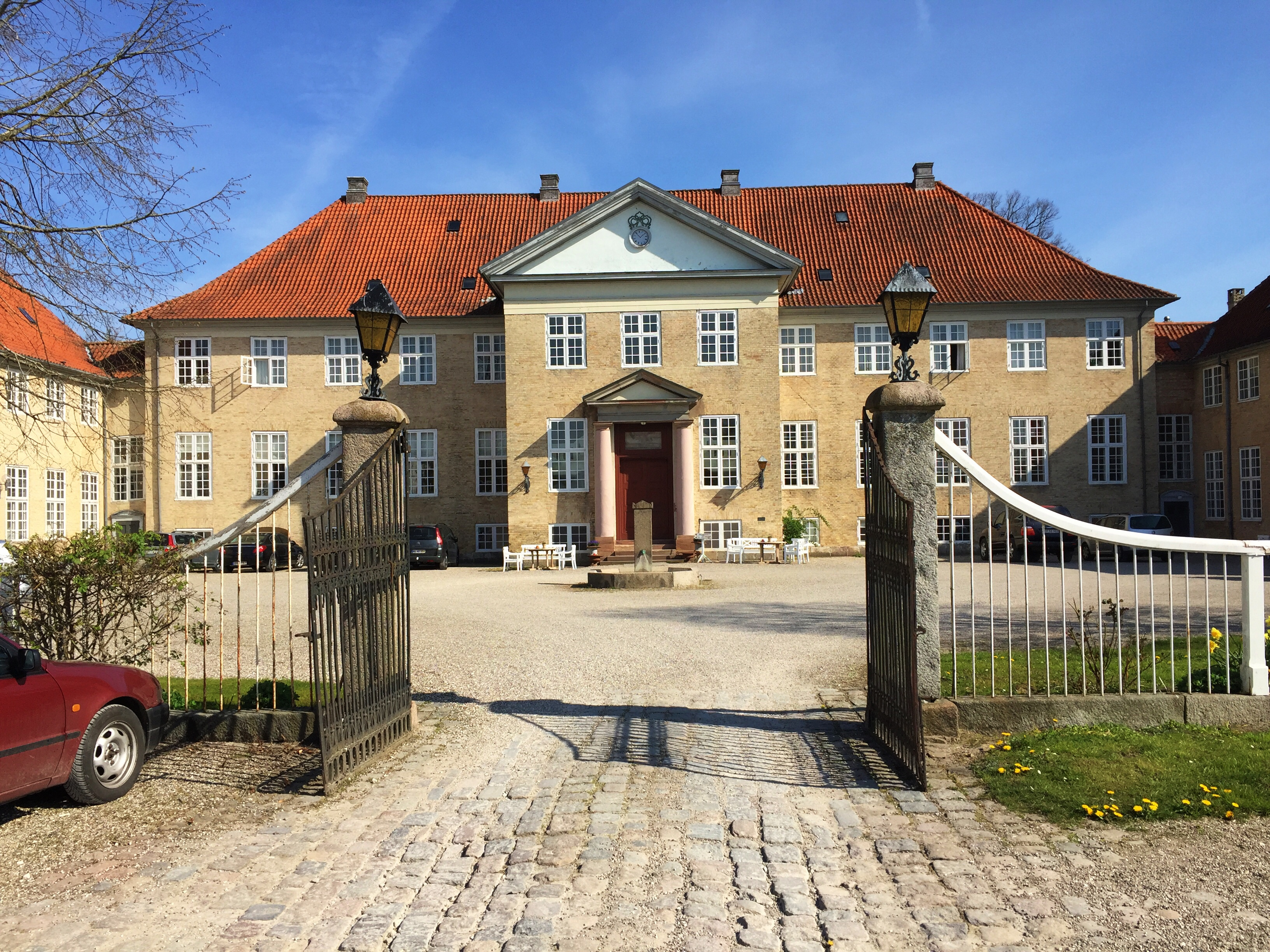
- Skjoldenæsholm manor house
- Interactive map of the Skjoldenæsholm Castle area

General information
- Architectural style: Neoclassical
- Location: Ringsted, Denmark, Denmark
- Coordinates: 55°32′07.85″N 11°51′10.80″E
- Completed: 1766 (main wing)
- Client: Anna Joachimine Danneskiold-Laurvig

Skjoldenæsholm Castle (Danish: Skjoldnæsholm Slot) is a manor house located 11 kilometres north-east of Ringsted, Denmark, standing on the west side of one of the many lakes which dominate the area. The Neoclassical main building, possibly by Philip de Lange, is now run as a hotel and conference centre while the grounds play host to both the Skjoldenæsholm Tram Museum (Sporvejsmuseet Skjoldenæsholm) and a golf course. The rest of the land is mostly forested.

== History ==
=== The first castle ===
Originally located 1.5 km (0.93 mi) to the south of the current house, Skjoldenæs is first recorded in the 1340s when it was owned by the crown and referred to as a "castle of considerable size". King Christopher II mortgaged the estate to John III, Count of Holstein-Plön (Johan den Milde). King Valdemar IV can with certainty be linked to the locale, in either 1346 or 1348, when he besieged the castle.

=== Müller's house ===
The medieval castle was demolished in 1567 but a castle bank surrounded by moats can still be seen at the site today. The estate was crown land for an extended period of time, held in fee by various members of the Danish nobility until 1662 when it was ceded to the King's rentemester Henrik Müller (1609-1692). Over the next few years, between 1663 and 1666, Müller completed a new manor house, half-timbered and in one storey, at the site of the current main building.

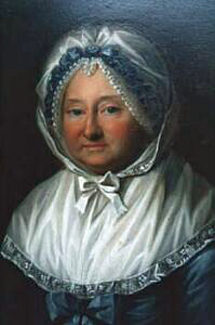
Anna Joachimine Danneskiold-Laurvig painted in 1785

=== Danneskiold-Laurvig era ===
After Müller's death in 1682, the estate was reacquired by the king, Christian V and presented to his half-brother Ulrik Frederik Gyldenløve. He also owned the Gyldenløve Mansion in Copenhagen as well as several other estates in Denmark and Norway. After his death, Skjoldenæsjolm passed to his son Ferdinand Anton Danneskiold-Laurvig. He remained the owner of the estate until his own death in 1754. It was then passed to his son Frederik Ludvig Danneskiold-Laurvig. His widow Anna Joachimine Danneskiold-Laurvig (née Ahlefeldt, 1717–1795) kept the estate after her husband's death. She replaced the old main wing with the one seen today in 1766.

=== Bruun de Neergaards era ===
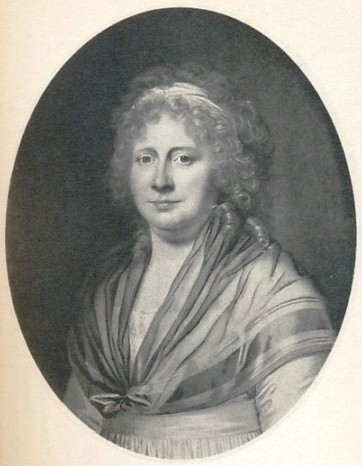
Ane Marie Bruun de Neergaard (née Møller).

In 1794, Joachimine Danneskiold-Laurvig sold the estate to Anna Marie Bruun de Neergaard (née Møller). She was the widow of Jens Bruun de Neergaard (1742-1778). She had until then lived at Svenstrup Manor. After her death, Skjoldenæsholm was passed to their son Johan Andreas Bruun de Neergaard (1770-1836). After his own death, it was passed to his son Andreas Theodor Bruun De Neergaard (1808-1891) and then to his grandson Poul Johan Carl Bruun de Neergaard (1751-1832). In 1914, Poul Bruun de Neergaard ceded the estate to his son Henri Bruun de Neergaard.

Skjoldenæsholm has remained in the ownership of members of the Bruun de Neergaard family.

== Today ==
The main building was in 1971 converted into a conference centre. The estate covers 1,272 hectares (3,140 acres) of land, including Skjoldenæsholm Tramway Museum which was founded in 1978 and a golf course. The rest consists mainly of forest.

In 1998, the castle was setting for Thomas Vinterberg's film The Celebration, one of the central works of the Danish Dogme 95 group.

== Architecture ==
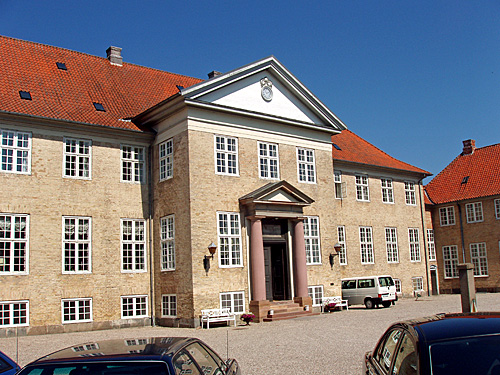
The main wing

The sober Neoclassical main wing from 1766 stands in washed, yellow brick. The architect is not known but may have been Philip de Lange.

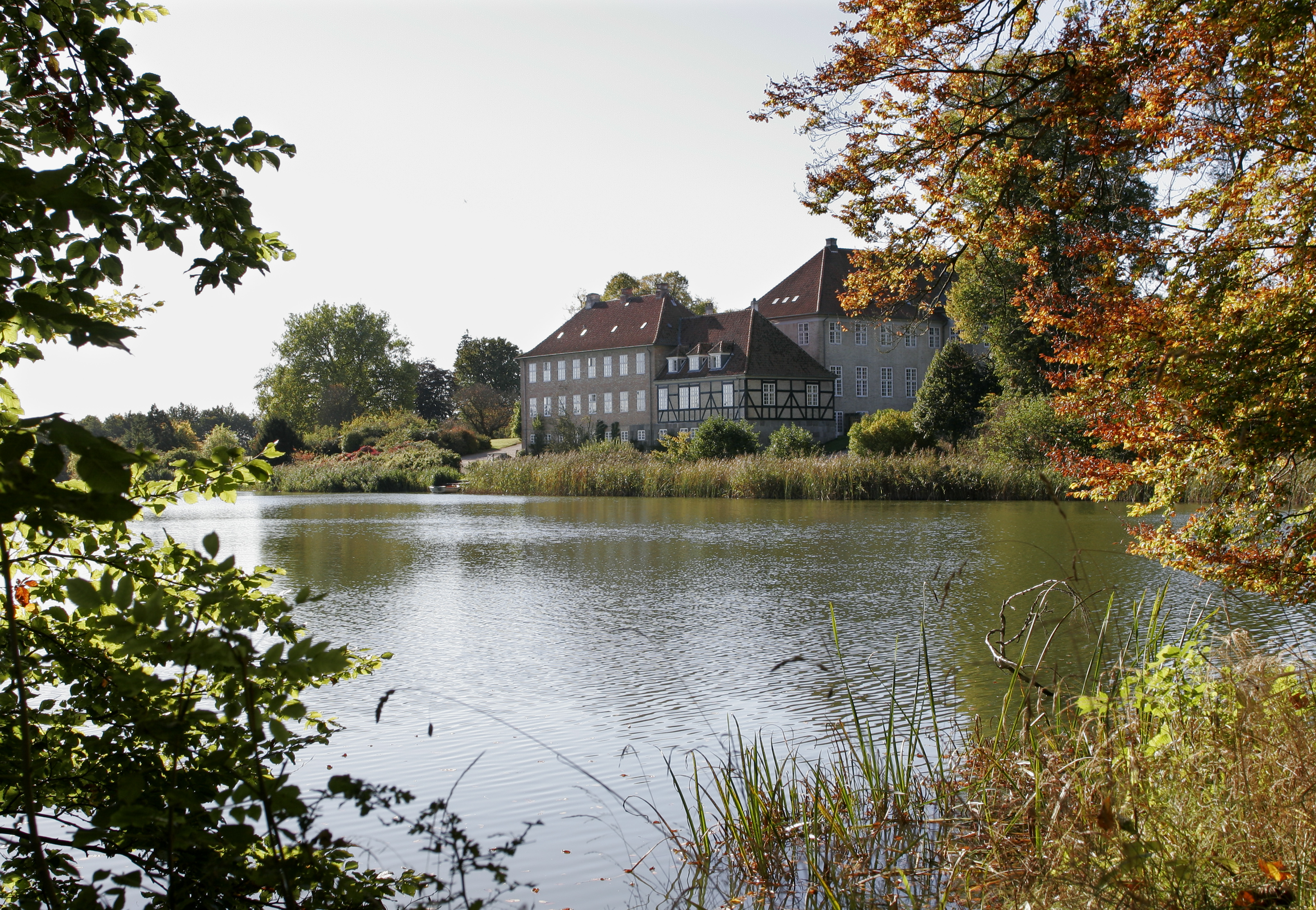
The oldest, timber-framed part of the building as seen from the east across the lake

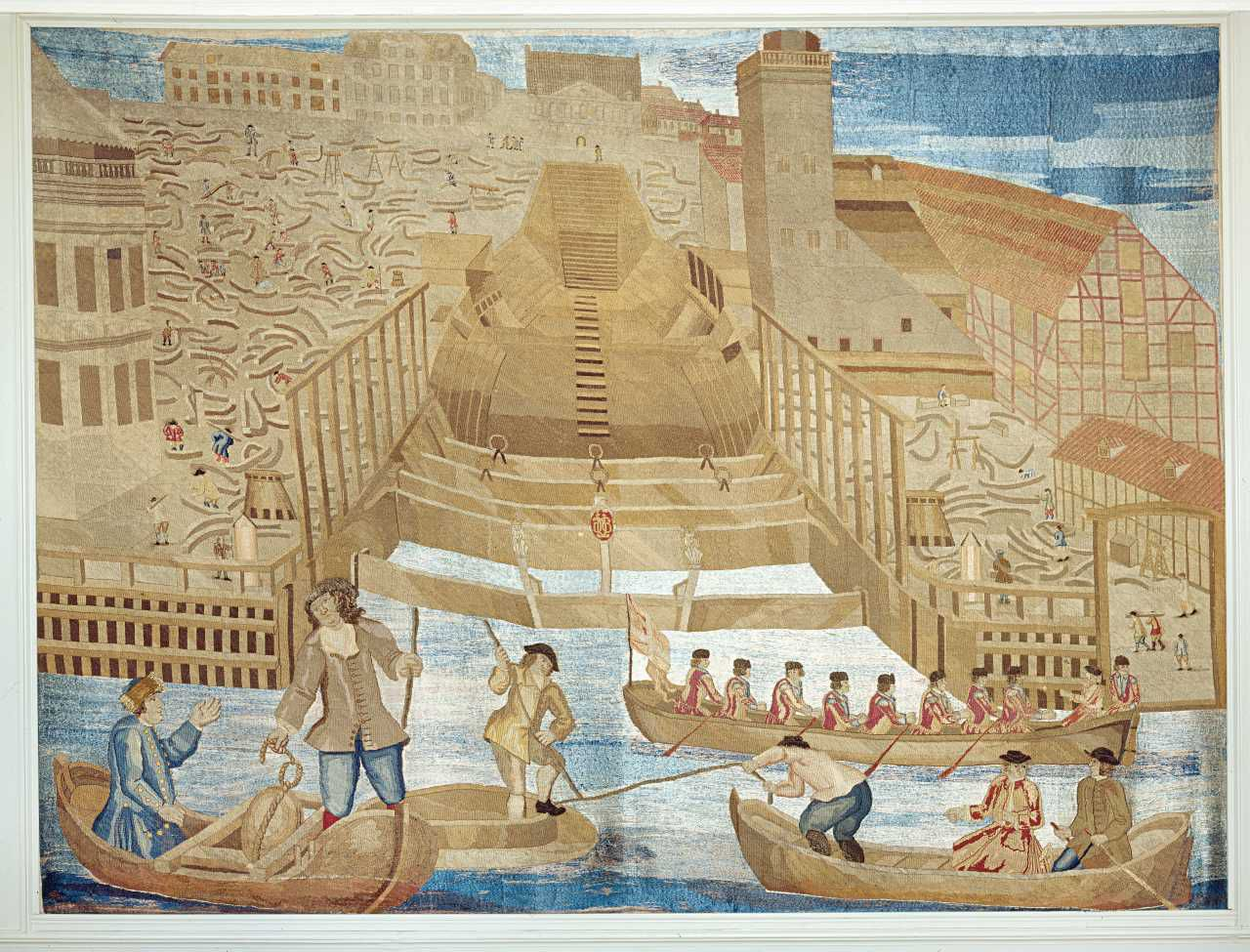
Tapestry

Originally, the red hip roof also covered the three-bay median risalits, found on both sides of the main wing, which received their triangular pediment in connection with a major renovation in 1703. The renovation also added a new east wing and gave the old half-timbered west wing a new facade in masonry towards the courtyard, which matched it. The east wing is connected to a surviving part of Müller's half-timbered timber-framed house.

The interior displays several fine examples of 18th-century period decorations.

== List of owners ==
- ( -1364) Kronen
- (1364-1378) Peder Nielsen Jernskæg
- (1378-1385) Anne Pedersdatter Jernskæg, gift 1) Lunge, 2) Rud
- (1385-1401) Mikkel Rud
- (1401-1429) Jørgen Rud
- (1429-1662) Kronen
- (1662-1682) Henrik Müller
- (1682-1683) Kronen
- (1683-1696) Ulrik Frederik Gyldenløve
- (1696-1703) Christian Gyldenløve
- (1703-1720) Frederikke Louisa Danneskiold-Samsøe, gift Augustenborg
- (1720) Christian af Augustenborg
- (1720-1754) Ferdinand Anton Danneskiold-Laurvig
- (1754-1762) Frederik Ludvig Danneskiold-Laurvig
- (1762-1794) Anna Joachimine Ahlefeldt, gift Danneskiold-Laurvig
- (1794-1796) Anna Marie Møller, gift Bruun de Neergaard
- (1796-1846) Johan Andreas Bruun de Neergaard
- (1846-1891) Andreas Theodor Bruun de Neergaard
- (1891-1914) Poul Johan Carl Bruun de Neergaard
- (1914-1935) Henri Bruun de Neergaard
- (1935-1960) Ejler Bruun de Neergaard
- (1960-2001) Vilhelm Bruun de Neergaard
- (1993-2005) Pensionskassen Pen-Sam
- (2001-2005) Boet efter Vilhelm Bruun de Neergaard
- (2005- ) Susanne Bruun de Neergaard (kun hovedbygning)

== See also ==
- The Celebration, a 1998 Danish film which is set within the castle.
