= Ringsted Municipality =

Ringsted Municipality Ringsted Kommune (Danish)
- Municipality
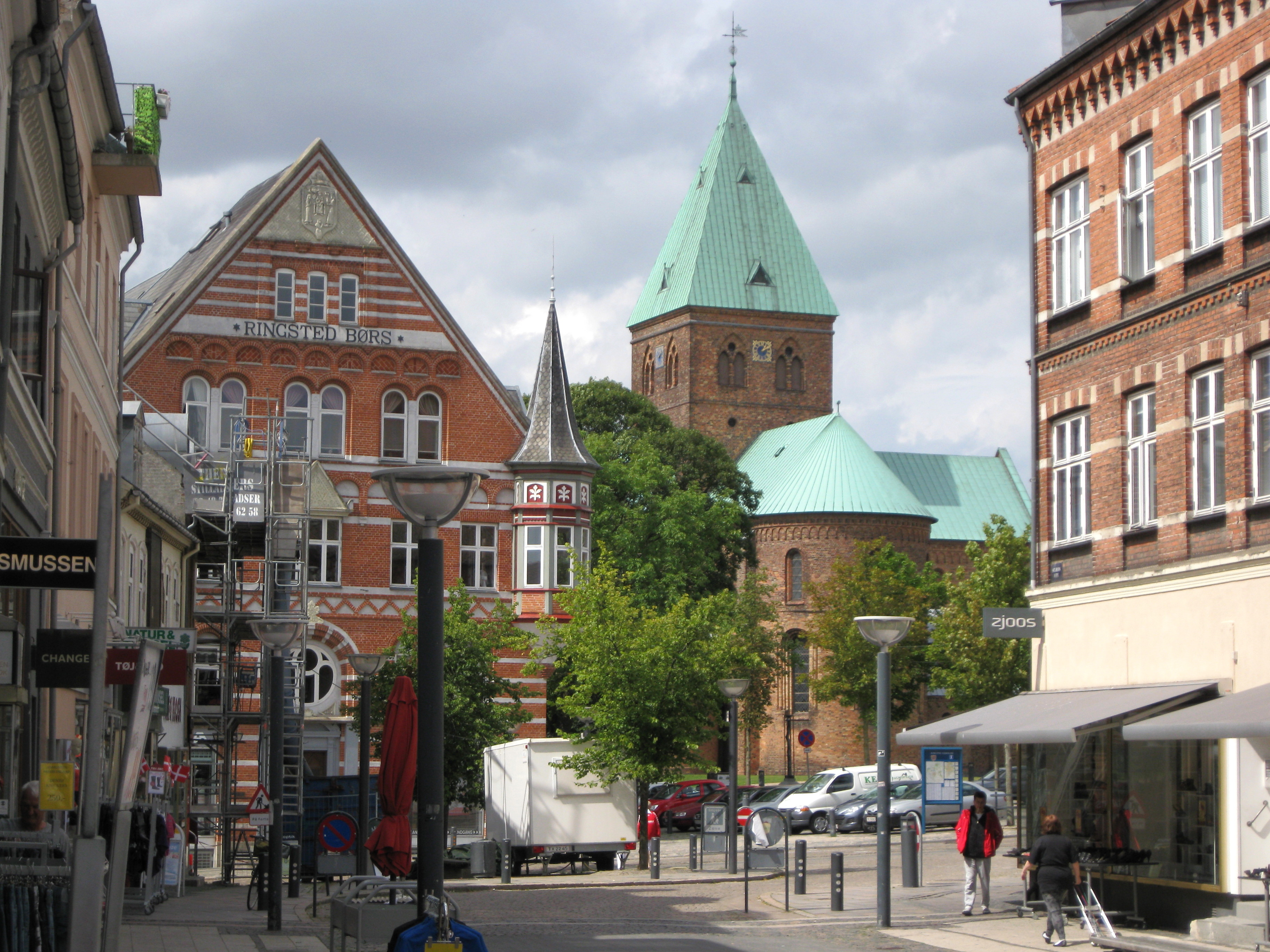
- A street in Ringsted

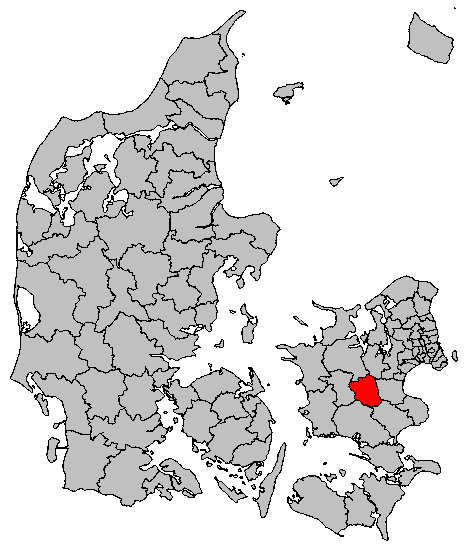
- Coordinates: 55°26′43″N 11°47′20″E
- Country: Denmark
- Region: Zealand
- Established: 1 April 1970
- Seat: Ringsted

Government
  - Mayor: Andreas Karlsen (C)

Area
  - Total: 295.48 km^{2} (114.09 sq mi)

Population (1 January 2026)
  - Total: 36,010
  - Density: 121.9/km^{2} (315.6/sq mi)
- Time zone: UTC+1 (CET)
  - Summer (DST): UTC+2 (CEST)
- Postal code: 4100
- Municipal code: 329
- Website: ringsted.dk

Ringsted Municipality (Danish: Ringsted Kommune) is a kommune in the Region Sjælland on the island of Zealand in east Denmark. The municipality covers an area of 295 km^{2}, and has a total population of 36,010 (2026). Its mayor is Andreas Karlsen, a member of Det Konservative Folkeparti.

The main town and the site of its municipal council is the city of Ringsted.

Ringsted municipality was not merged with other municipalities on 1 January 2007, during the nationwide Kommunalreformen ("The Municipal Reform" of 2007).

== Urban areas ==
The ten largest urban areas in the municipality are:

#	Locality	Population
1	Ringsted	21,151
2	Jystrup	744
3	Ørslev	672
4	Kværkeby	598
5	Vetterslev	562
6	Høm	472
7	Vigersted	470
8	Sneslev	390
9	Farendløse	362
10	Gyrstinge	348

Others include Ortved.

== Politics ==
=== Municipal council ===
Ringsted's municipal council consists of 21 members, elected every four years.

Below are the municipal councils elected since the Municipal Reform of 2007.

Election	Party										Total seats	Turnout	Elected mayor
Election	A	B	C	D	F	I	L	O	V	Ø	Total seats	Turnout	Elected mayor
2005	7	1	1		2		1	2	7		21	68.3%	Niels Ulrich Hermansen (V)
2009	6	1	1		3			3	7		21	65.5%	Niels Ulrich Hermansen (V)
2013	5	1	1		1	1		4	7	1	21	73.3%	Henrik Hvidesten (V)
2017	5	1	3		1			3	6	2	21	70.3%	Henrik Hvidesten (V)
2021	4		6	1	2			1	6	1	21	65.81%	Henrik Hvidesten (V) (2021-24); Klaus Hansen (V) (2024-25)
2025	4		10		2			1	3	1	21	68.0%	Andreas Karlsen (C)
Data from Kmdvalg.dk 2005, 2009, 2013, 2017, valg.dk 2021 and 2025

== Attractions ==
- St. Bendt's Church (Skt. Bendts Kirke) is located in the middle of the town. The church contains several royal tombs.
- Skjoldenæsholm Tram Museum

== Notable people ==
- Nicolai Eigtved (1701 in Egtved, Haraldsted – 1754) a Danish architect; proponent of the French rococo
- Hemming Hansen (1884 in Kværkeby – 1964) a Danish boxer who competed in the 1908 Summer Olympics
- Ricardt Madsen (1905 in Kværkeby – 1993) a Danish boxer who competed in the 1928 Summer Olympics
- Michael Brockenhuus-Schack (born 1960) a Danish count, landowner, chamberlain and board member; owns Giesegaard and Juellund at Ringsted.

== Image gallery ==
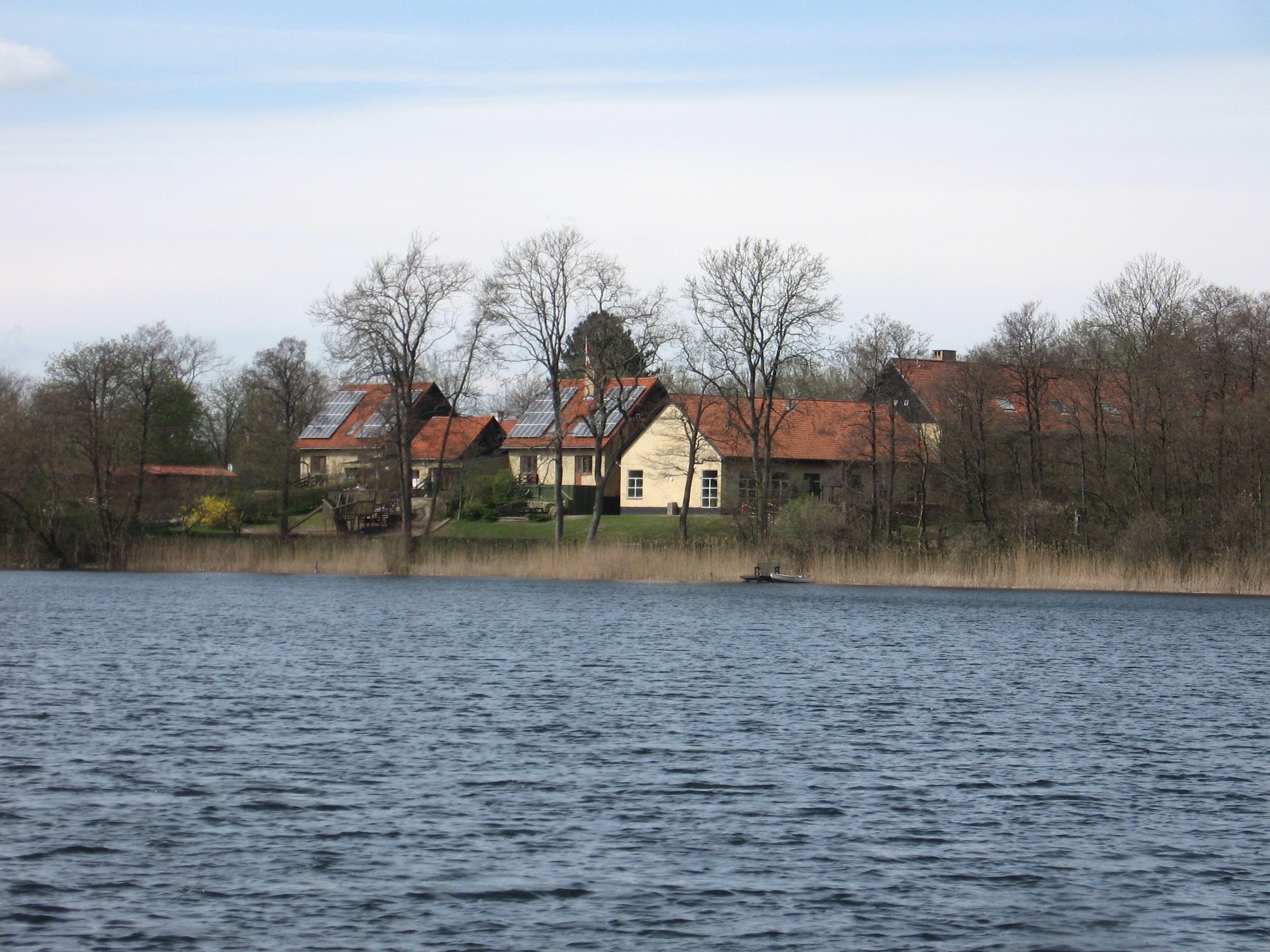
Jystrup

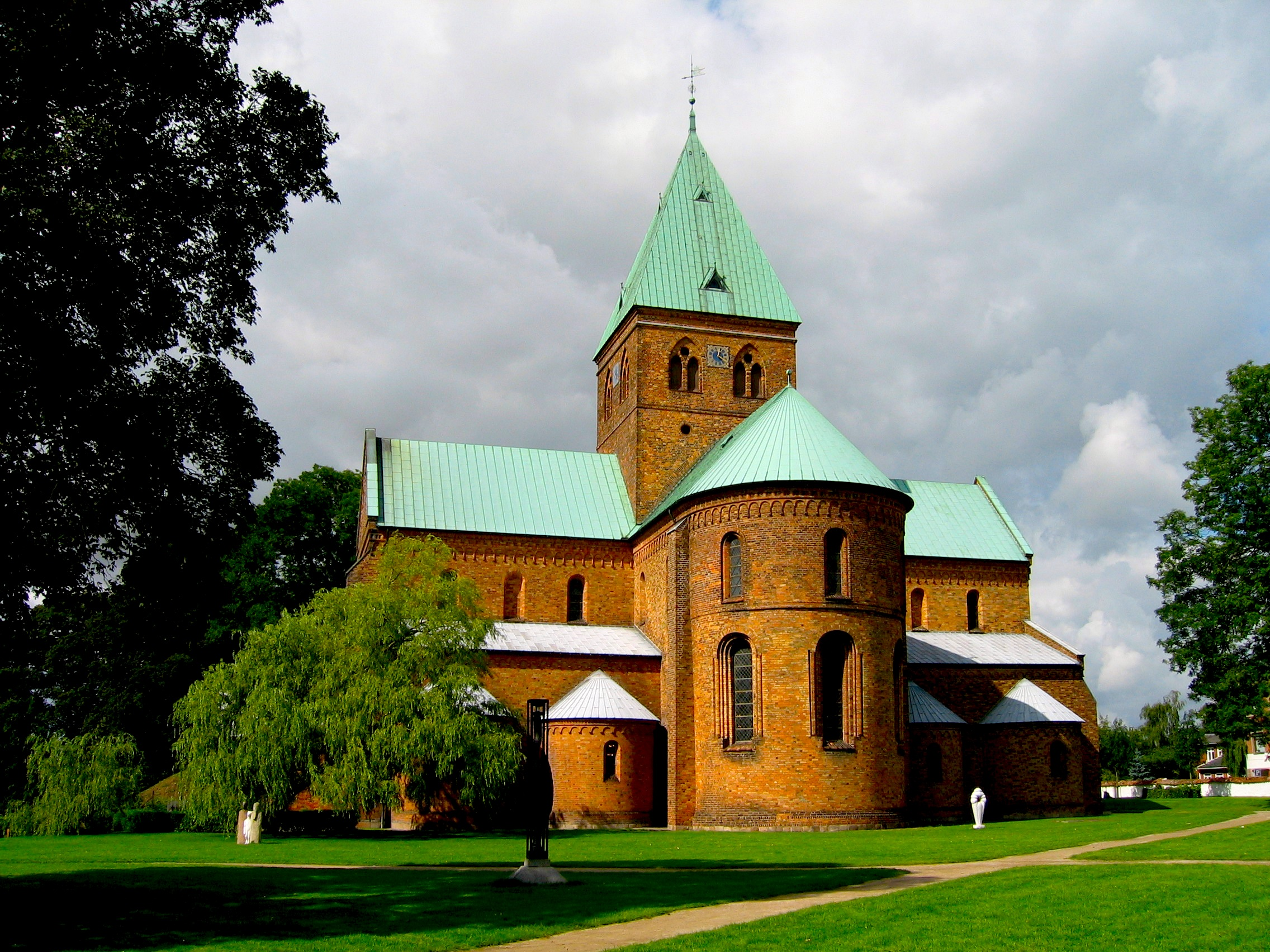
St. Bendt's Church

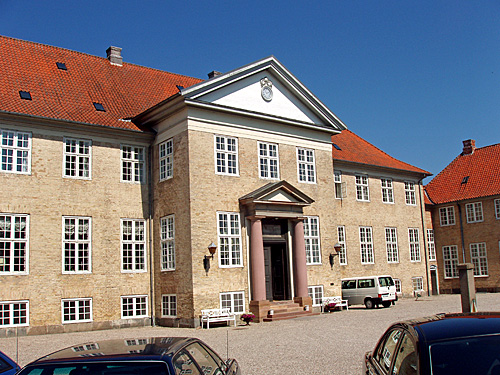
Skjoldenæsholm Castle

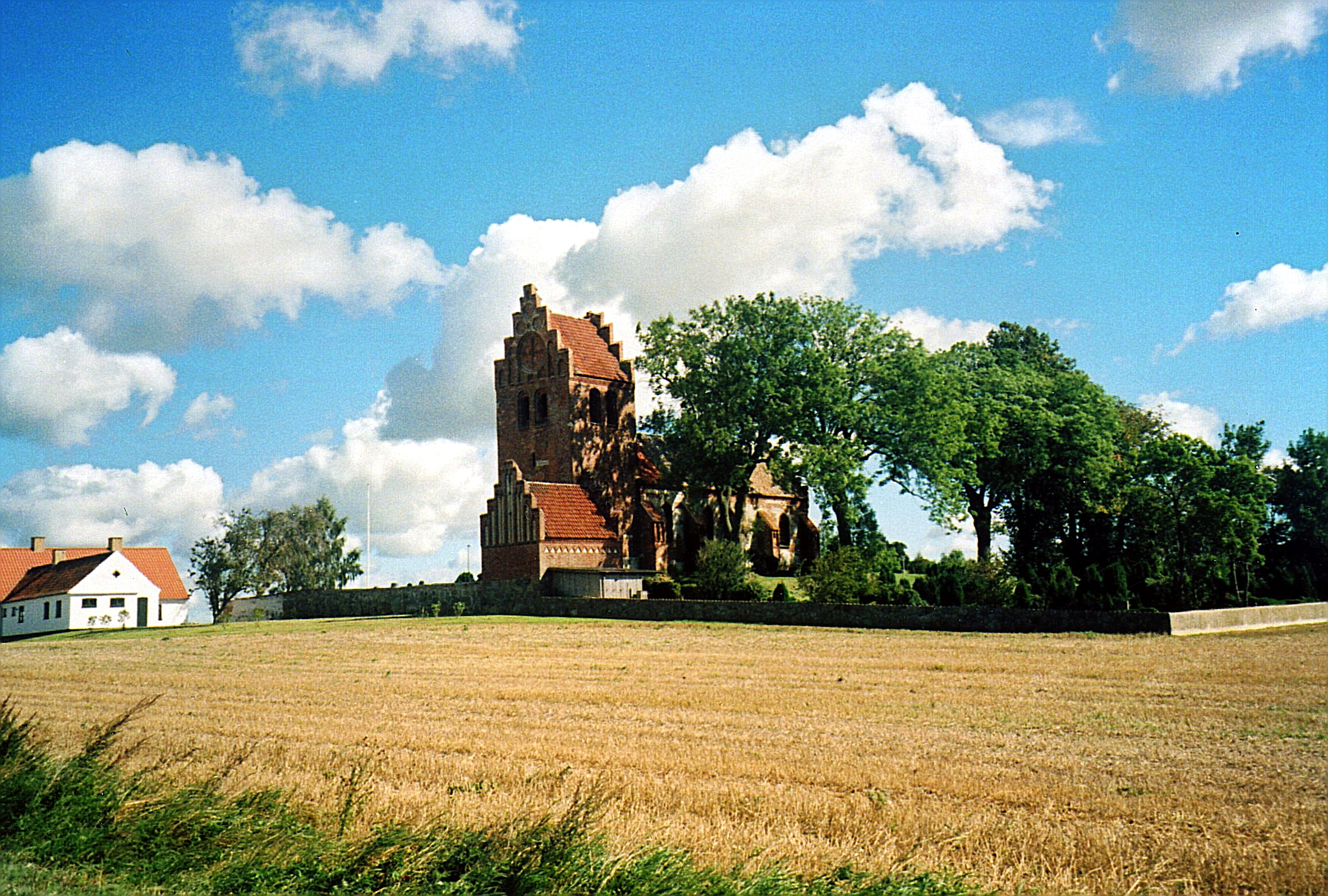
Sneslev Church
