= Ringsted =

- City
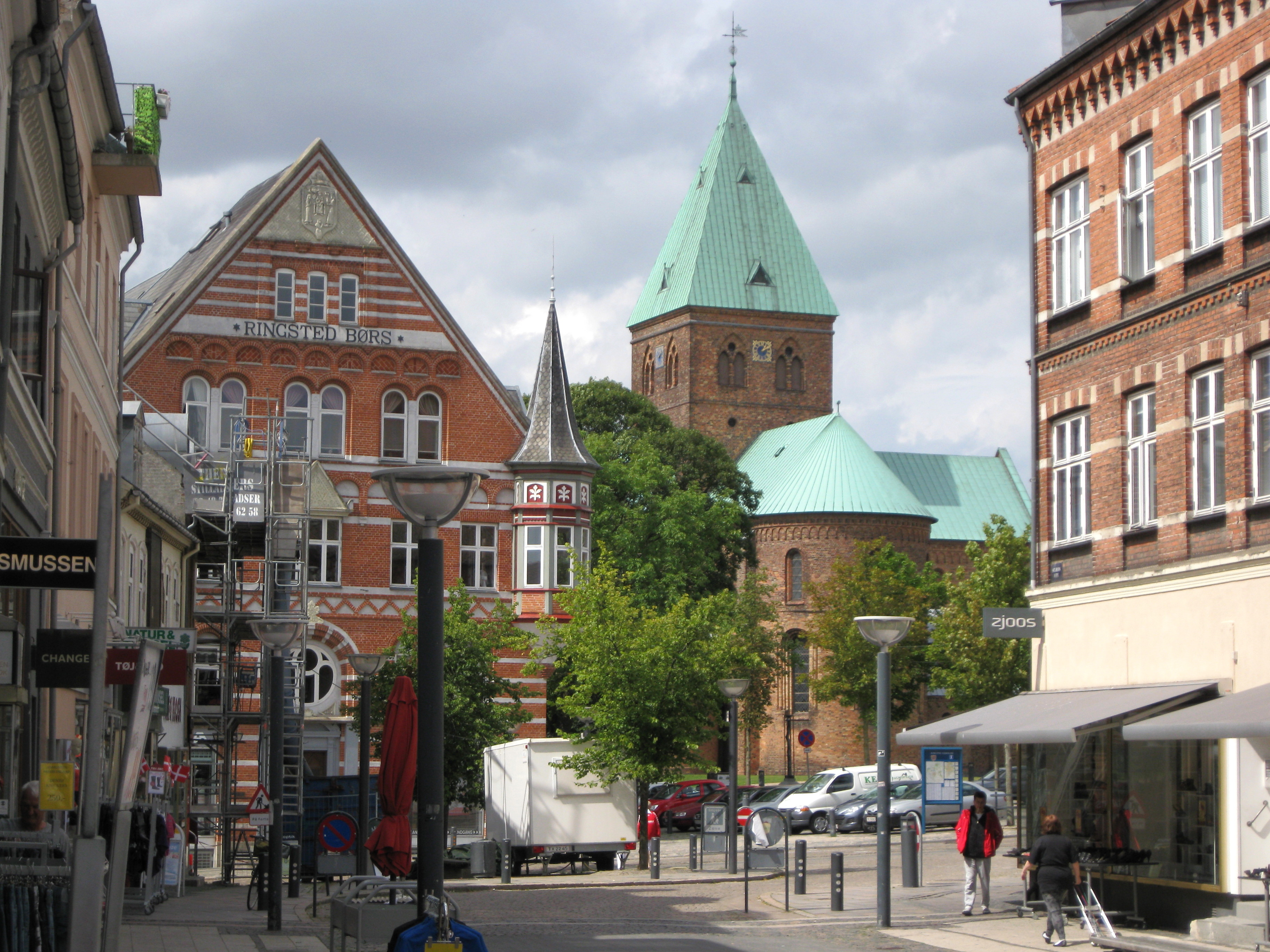
- Saint Bendt's Church (Skt. Bendts Kirke) in Ringsted, Denmark

- Coat of arms

- Location in Denmark Ringsted (Denmark Region Zealand)
- Coordinates: 55°26′33″N 11°47′24″E
- Country: Denmark
- Region: Zealand (Sjælland)
- Municipality: Ringsted

Area
  - Urban: 13.8 km^{2} (5.3 sq mi)
- Elevation: 54 m (177 ft)

Population (2026)
  - Urban: 23,866
  - Urban density: 1,730/km^{2} (4,480/sq mi)
  - Municipality: 36,010
  - Gender: 11,768 males and 12,098 females
- Demonym: Ringsteder
- Postal code: 4100
- Area code: (+45) 57
- Website: ringsted.dk

Ringsted Danish pronunciation: [ˈʁæŋˀˌstɛð] is a city located centrally in the Danish island of Zealand. It is the seat of a municipality of the same name.

Ringsted is situated approximately 60 km (37 mi) from Copenhagen.

== History ==
Ringsted was the site of Sjællands Landsting (lit. Zealand's county thing) during the Middle Ages, which in 1584 moved to St. Bendt's church and became known as Sjællandsfar Landsting. In 1805 it moved to Copenhagen and was renamed Østre Landsret, and is still active under this name.

In 1131, Canute Lavard was killed in Haraldsted forest, leading to outbreaks of civil war.

The church was consecrated in 1170. In front of the church is the spacious town square leading to the shopping streets with shops and boutiques.

The town arms goes back to 1421. There has been much discussion about what it portrays. The traditional answer is at the top the hand of God and under that Virgin Mary with Jesus surrounded by three figures that worship her. The city officially interprets the three figures as Saint Canute Lavard, King Eric Plovpenning, and Saint Benedict of Nursia.

== Tourism ==
- Danish Tramway Museum of Skjoldenæsholm, near Jystrup.
- St. Bendt's Church — a Romanesque, former Benedictine, abbey church containing numerous tombs of medieval Danish royalty.

Ringsted features two shopping centers named RingStedet and Ringsted Outlet Center. Ringsted Outlet Center consists of 48 flagship outlets and 2 restaurants. Ringsted also has a wide selection of cafes and restaurants, as well as two local breweries (Dagmarbryggeriet in Ringsted town and Det lille Bryggeri in Bringstrup) .

During the summer months, a mobile tourist office is opened in the town square.

Ringsted was previously home to Santa World, a tourist attraction featuring hundreds of animatronic Christmas elves, which later became Fantasy World.

== Sport ==
The local handball club TMS Ringsted has played in the top division on numerous occasions on both the men's and women's side.

== Transport ==
Ringsted is one of Denmark's busiest transit cities. The city is located in the very middle of the island of Zealand, connecting both the southern parts of Zealand as well as Funen and Jutland with the Copenhagen metropolitan area.

=== Rail ===
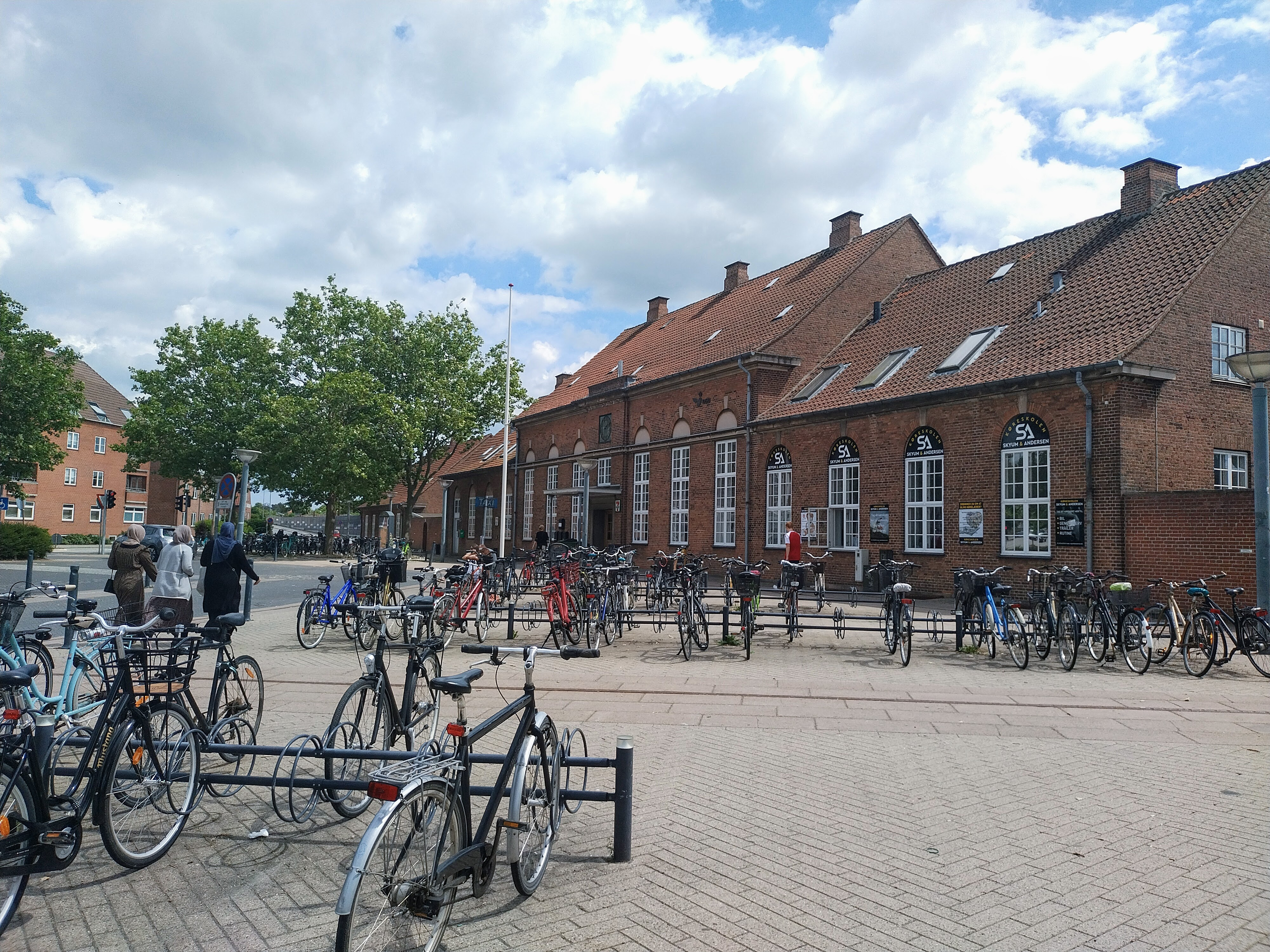
Front facade of Ringsted railway station.

Ringsted is served by Ringsted railway station, which is located in the centre of the town, on the southern edge of the historic town centre, and immediately adjacent to the Ringsted bus station. It is an important railway junction, located where the Copenhagen–Fredericia, Copenhagen–Ringsted and South Line railway lines meet. The station offers frequent direct InterCity services to Copenhagen, Odense, Aarhus, Aalborg, and Esbjerg as well as regional train services to Næstved and Elsinore.

== Government ==
Accident Investigation Board Denmark is headquartered in Ringsted.

== Notable people ==
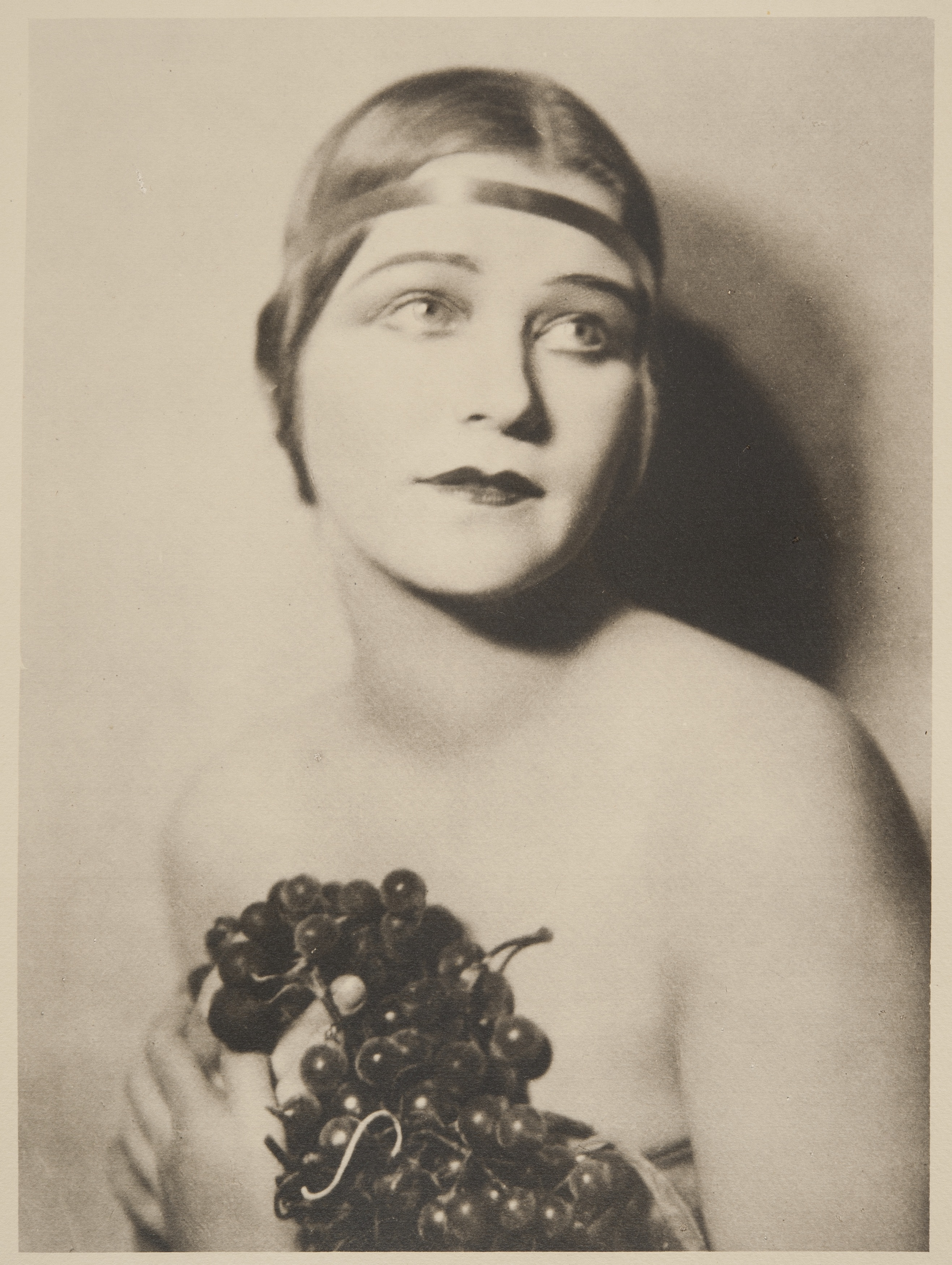
Edith von Bonsdorff, 1920

- Jørgen Roed (1808–1888) a portrait and genre painter of the Golden Age of Danish Painting
- P. C. Skovgaard (1817–1875) a Danish national romantic landscape painter
- Frederik Vermehren (1823–1910) a genre and portrait painter in the realist style
- Sophus Schandorph (1836–1901) a poet and novelist, with the Modern Break-through
- Edith von Bonsdorff (1890–1968) a Danish-Finnish ballet dancer and choreographer
- Jette Baagøe (born 1946) the director of the Danish Museum of Hunting and Forestry
- Poul Ruders (born 1949) a Danish organist and composer
- Werner Knudsen (born 1953) a computer scientist, composer and author
- Michael Poulsen (born 1975) Danish vocalist and guitarist.

=== Sport ===
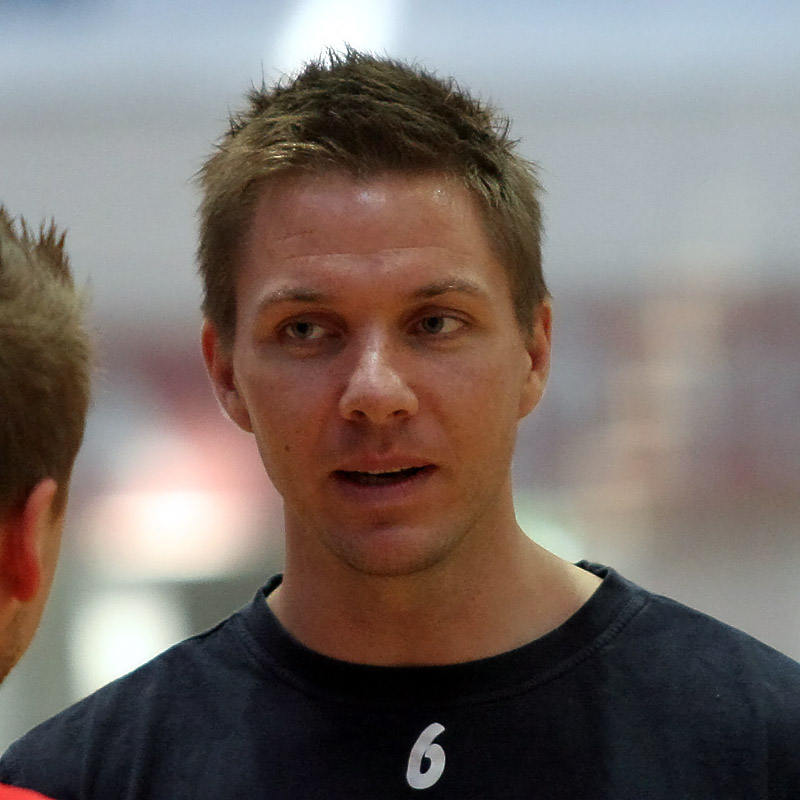
Anders Oechsler, 2009

- Fritz Tarp (1899–1958) a Danish football player, with 250 caps with B.93 and 44 caps for Denmark, 26 as captain
- Omar Hermansen (1913–1998) a Danish boxer who competed in the 1936 Summer Olympics
- Helle Sørensen (born 1963) a former cyclist, competed at the 1984 Summer Olympics
- Trine Hansen (born 1973) a retired female rower, team bronze medallist at the 1996 Summer Olympics
- Ulrich Vinzents (born 1976) a Danish retired footballer, over 450 team caps
- Henrik Hansen (born 1977) a Danish cricketer
- Anders Oechsler (born 1979) a retired Danish handball player
- Kristian Pedersen (born 1994) a Danish footballer who plays for Swansea City A.F.C.

== Sister cities ==
Gyöngyös - Hungary; Halden - Norway; Kutná Hora - Czech Republic	Ringsted, Iowa, United States; Skövde Municipality - Sweden; Vammala - Finland
