= Liberty Column =

Obelisk in Copenhagen, Denmark

Coordinates: 55.6742°N 12.5633°E

- Frihedsstøtten
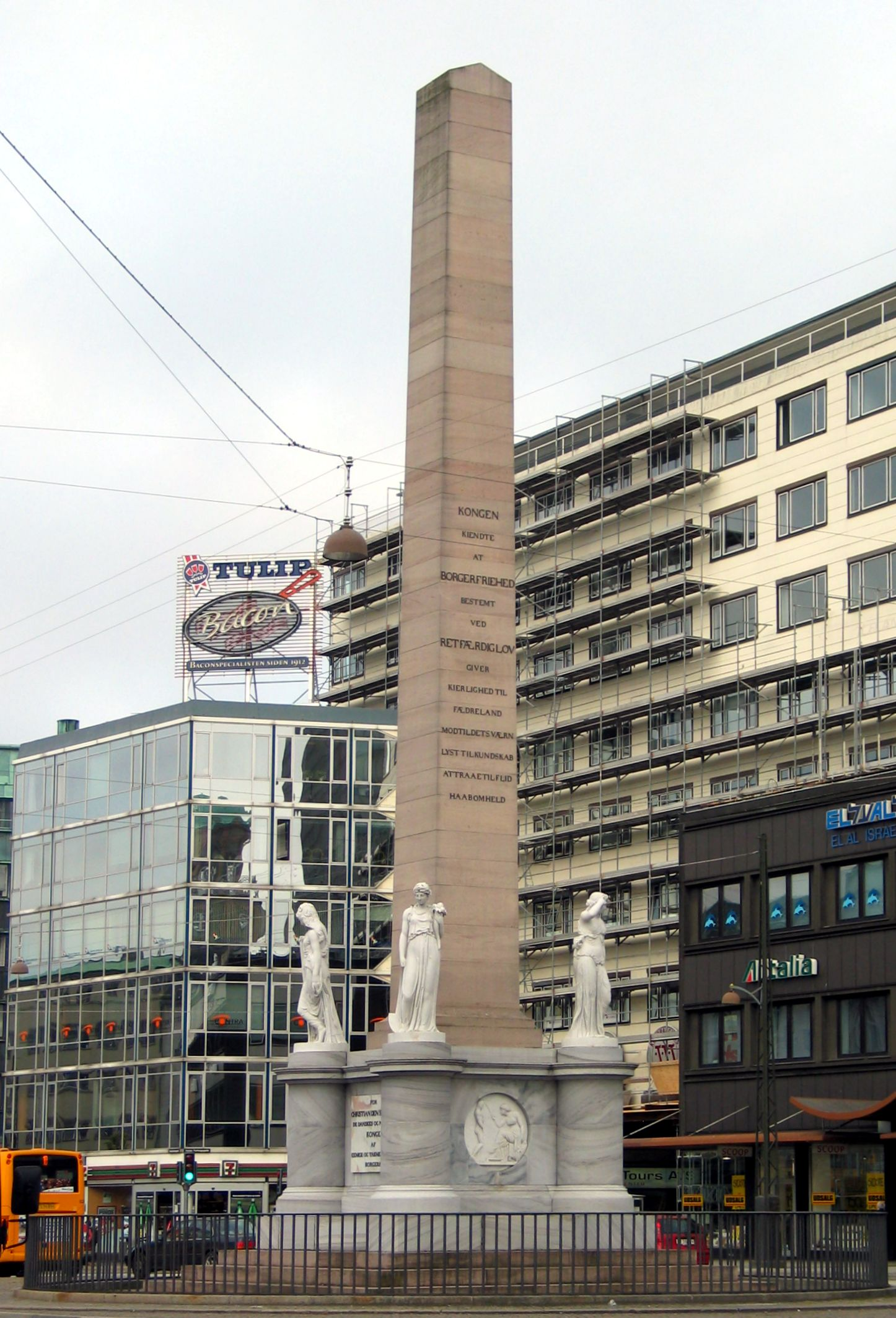
- The Liberty Column, 2005
- Completion date: 1797
- Medium: Sandstone and Marble
- Dimensions: 20 cm (7.9 in)
- Location: Copenhagen, Denmark

The Liberty Column (Danish: Frihedsstøtten) is a 20-meter-tall (66 ft) obelisk located in front of Central Station in Copenhagen, Denmark. It was erected in memory of the peasant reforms of 1788 which led to the abolition of stavnsbåndet, a form of serfdom in Denmark. The foundation stone for the structure was laid in 1792 and the monument was completed in 1797.

The obelisk is made of red sandstone from Nexø and its base is made of white Norwegian marble. It was designed by Nicolai Abildgaard, with its statues and reliefs sculpted by Nicolai Dajon, Andreas Weidenhaupt, and Johannes Wiedewelt. The inscriptions on the monument were authored by the poet Thomas Thaarup.

== History ==
The creation of the monument was funded by the bourgeoisie of Copenhagen after the abolition of the stavnsbånd in 1788. The bourgeoisie did so in part to demonstrate their gratitude for the reforms, but also to prevent the monarchy and state from repealing due to pressure from the nobility. The landowning nobility had lost power due to the reforms and were applying increasing pressure on the state to deter it from further reforms. In light of this political climate, the monument was an effort by the middle class to influence the monarchy and keep the state on the course of reform. An open invitation seeking individual contributions to help fund the project was issued on 23 April 1791.

The location for the new monument, in the center of an existing square, was chosen as it was an important entrance point to the center of Copenhagen. It is located at the head of Vesterbrogade, which was then a busy road that connected the surrounding villages to Copenhagen and was used by local farmers bringing their goods for sale at the city's market squares. The location was granted by royal resolution for the construction of a monument on 19 August 1791.

The foundation stone was set by Crown Prince Frederick on 21 September 1792 in the presence of several government ministers and the leaders of the reform movement. The adjacent streets Bernstorffsgade and Reventlowsgade, running on each their side of the central station, and Colbjørnsensgade, situated one block further to the west, were named for Andreas Peter Bernstorff, Christian Ditlev Frederik Reventlow and Christian Colbjørnsen, three of the driving forces behind the peasant reforms.

It was completed in September 1797, and renovated for the first time in 1850–1851. When it was erected, the monument stood in a circular clearing that was surrounded by trees. When legislation was passed in 1904 for the creation of a new central railway station in Copenhagen, however, the monument stood in the way of the proposed construction. To make way for the new station and railway bed, the original clearing surrounding the liberty column was demolished. The column itself was dismantled in 1909 and re-erected in 1912 close to its original location. This move was protested by architects at the time, who saw its original location as a historically significant symbol of the entrance to Copenhagen.

The monument was again removed in 1996, this time in order to carry out major repairs to the column. The restored Liberty Column was unveiled in 1999, having been largely replaced by a replica.

== Design ==
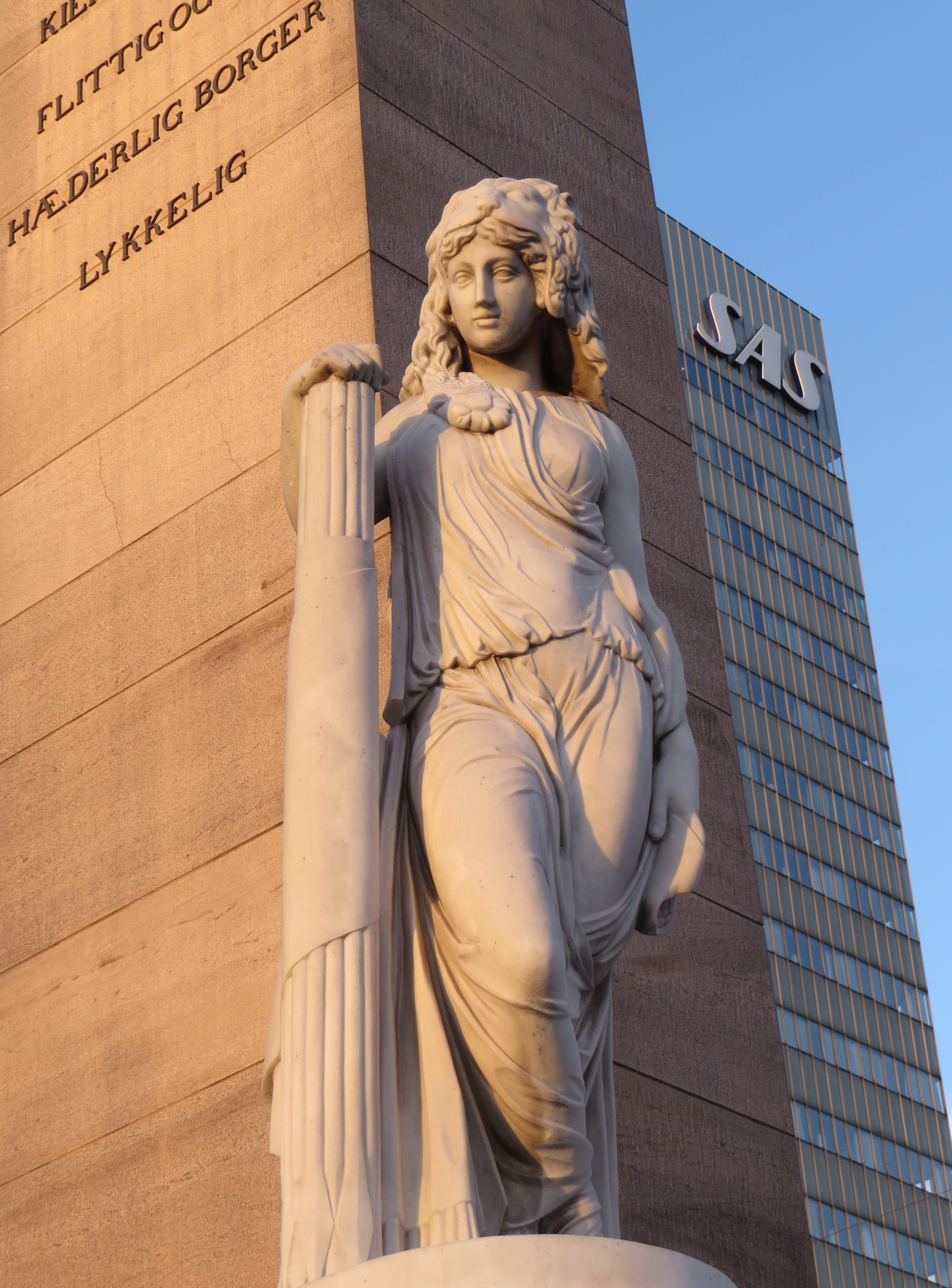
The southwestern statue which represents bravery, originally created by Nicolai Dajon

The architect and painter Nicolai Abildgaard was charged with the design of the monument and was heavily driven by architect Boye Magens. Its four statues were created by Johannes Wiedewelt, Nicolai Dajon and Andreas Weidenhaupt. Two additional reliefs by the same artists are installed on opposite sides of the marble base; one depicting the abolition of slavery (trældom afskaffes) and the other the genius of justice (retfærdighedens genius). The four female figures at the base of the obelisk symbolise bravery, civic virtue, fidelity, and the cultivation of land.

The statue representing bravery was created by Nicolai Dajon and faces southeast. It depicts a woman wearing a lion's skin who stands beside a bundle of spears. The statue representing civil virtue was also created by Dajon and faces northeast. It depicts a woman wearing a oak-leaf laurel wreath.

The statue for fidelity was created by Johannes Wiedewelt and faces northwest. It is presented as a woman with her hand resting above her heart with a dog by her side. Unfortunately, The marble used for Wiedewelt's statue was sourced from a different location than the other figures on the monument, and proved far less durable. The original copy of the statue was destroyed by the time the monument was relocated in 1909, at which point it was replaced by a replica.

The statue representing the cultivation of land (Agerdyrkningen) was created by Andreas Weidenhaupt and faces southeast. It is made of white Italian marble and depicts Ceres, the Roman goddess of agriculture, holding a cornucopia with a plough by her side. Her hair is decorated by an ear of corn.

== Inscriptions ==
On the base of the monument, there are two marble tablets with inscriptions written in metal letters. The tablet on the north side reads: Grundstenen blev lagt af Frederik kongens søn folkets ven MDCCXCII (English: The foundation stone was laid by Frederick, the King's son, the people's friend 1972). The tablet facing south reads: For Christian den syvende de danskes og Norskes kong af eenige og taknemmelig borgere (English: For Christian VII, the king of the Danes and Norwegians, by united and grateful citizens).

The obelisk itself bears two inscriptions on opposite sides, both authored by the poet Thomas Thaarup:

Kongen kiendte at Borgerfriehed bestemt ved retfærdig Lov giver Kierlighed til Fædreland mod til dets Værn, lyst til Kundskab, Attraae til Flid, Haab om Held.
The king knew that civil liberty determined by just law yields love for the fatherland, courage to defend it, desire for knowledge, desire for industry, hope for success.

—inscription on the east side of the column

Kongen bød Stavnsbaandet skal ophøre Landboe Lovene gives Orden og Kraft at den frie Bonde kan vorde kiek og oplyst flittig og god hæderlig Borger lykkelig
The king ordered the Stavnsbånd to cease. The land laws are given order and force that the free peasant may become an intelligent and enlightened, diligent and good, honorable citizen, happily.

—inscription on the west side of the column

== Gallery ==
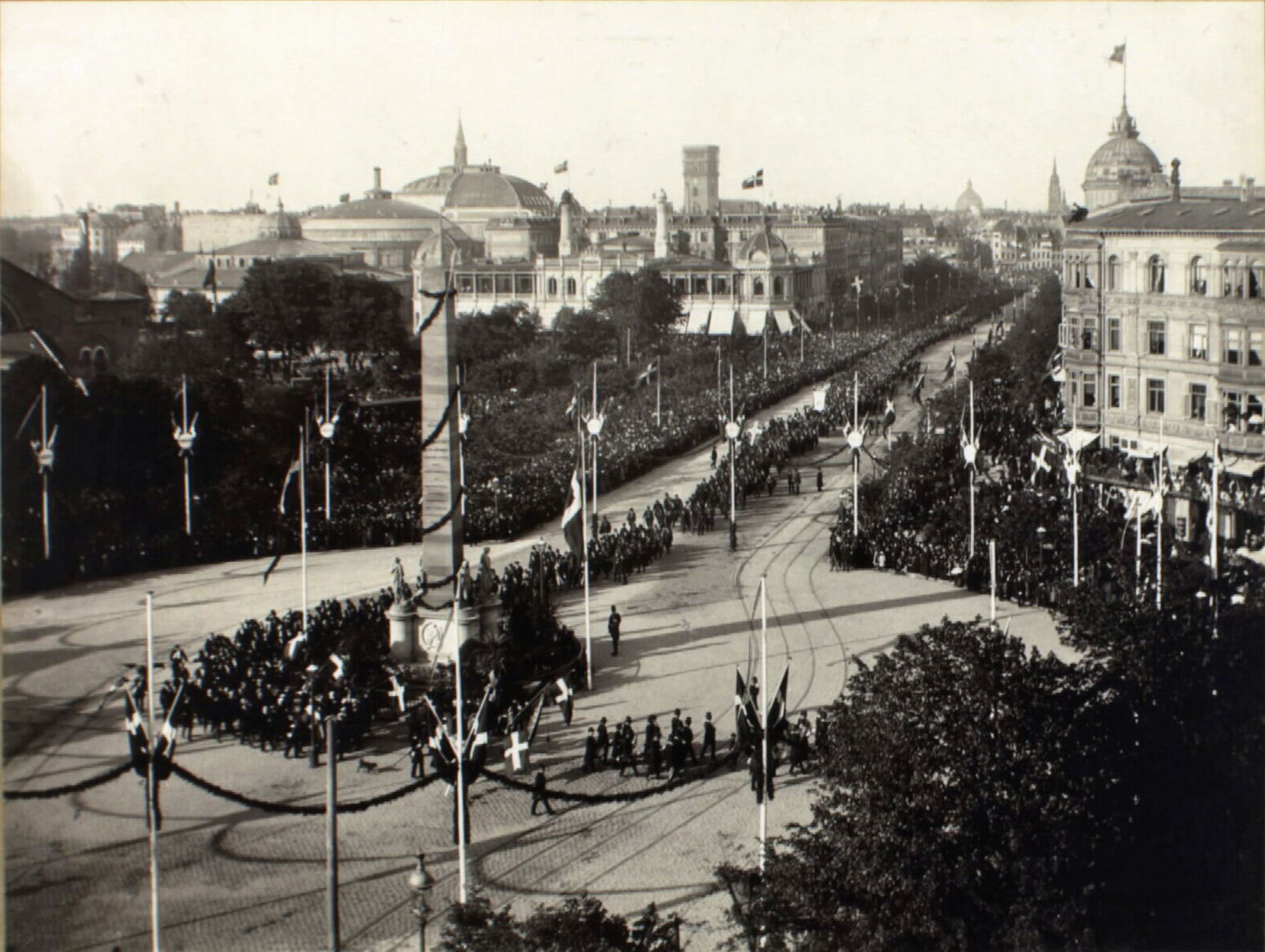
Celebrations around the Liberty Column on 20 June 1888, commemorating the 100-year anniversary of the abolition of the Stavnsbånd. Photographed by Sophus Juncker-Jensen.

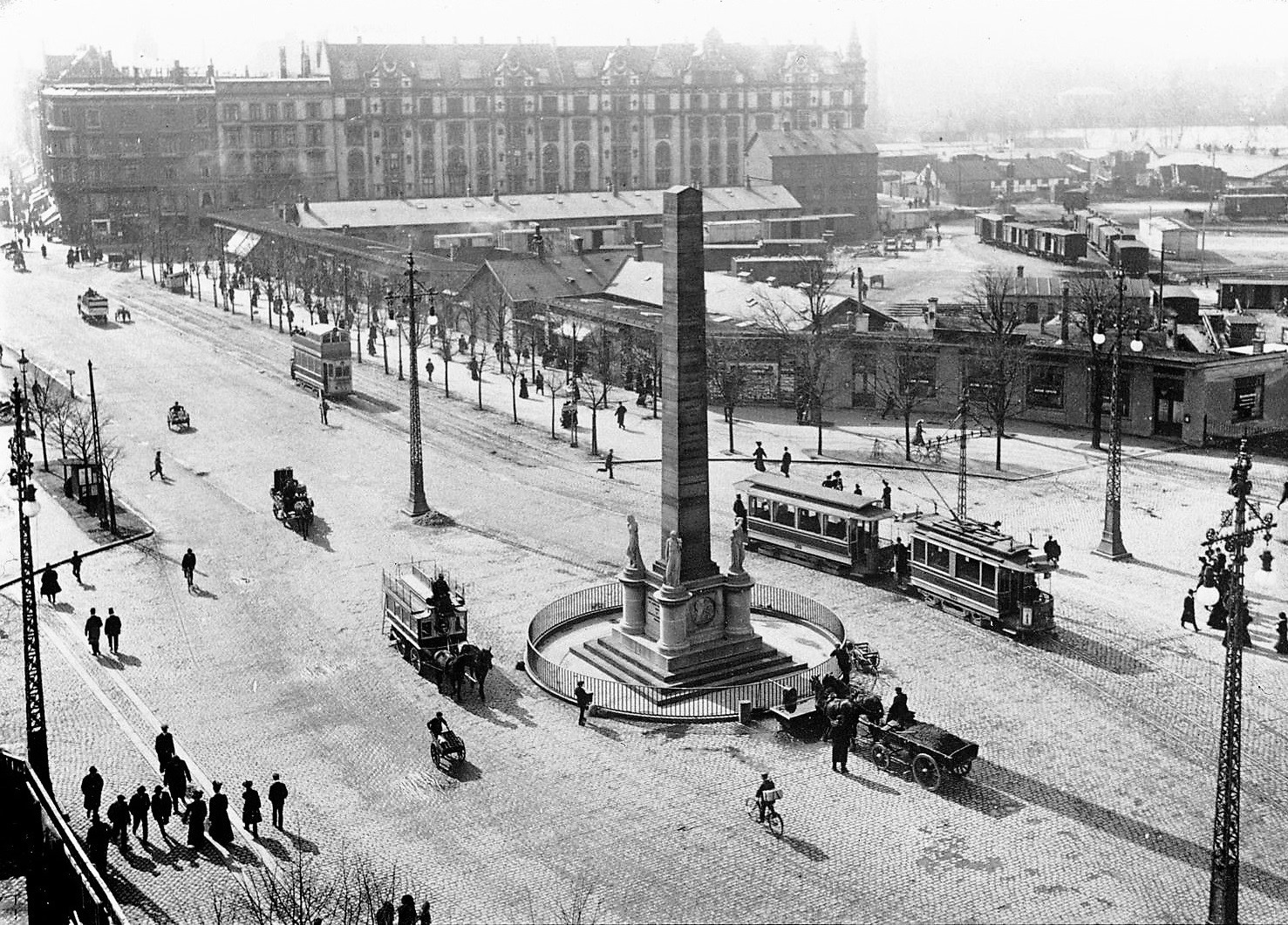
View of the Liberty Column in 1910

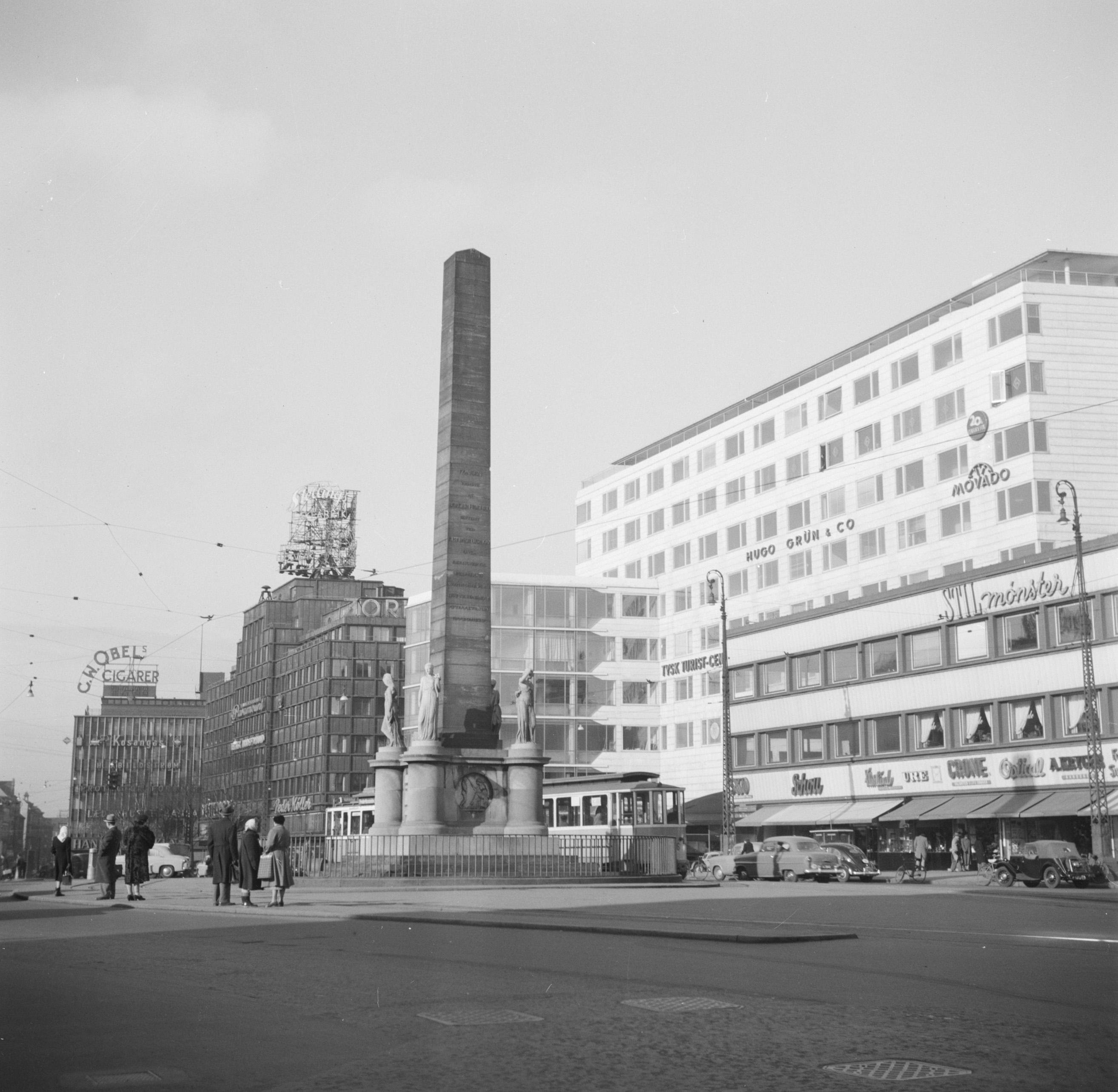
Pedestrians in front of the Liberty Column, 1954. Photographed by Willem van de Poll.

== See also ==
- Sculpture of Denmark
- Stavnsbånd
