= Lahde =

Lahde or Lähde may refer to

- Lahde, surname
- Lähde, a shopping mall in Rajamäki, Nurmijärvi, Finland
- Tarinain lähde, a 1974 poetry collection by Aale Tynni
- Petershagen-Lahde railway station in Germany
