= Bernhard Severin Ingemann =

Danish novelist and poet (1789–1862)

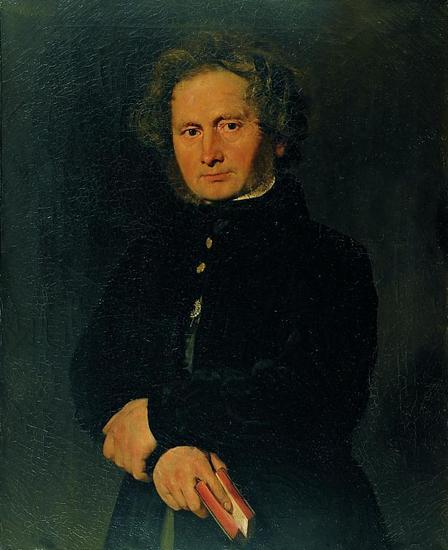
- Bernhard Severin Ingemann painted by Christian Albrecht Jensen in 1844
- Born: 28 May 1789; Falster, Denmark
- Died: 24 February 1862 (aged 72); Sorø, Denmark
- Occupation: Poet
- Spouse: Lucie Ingemann
- Writing career
- Literary movement: Romanticism

Signature
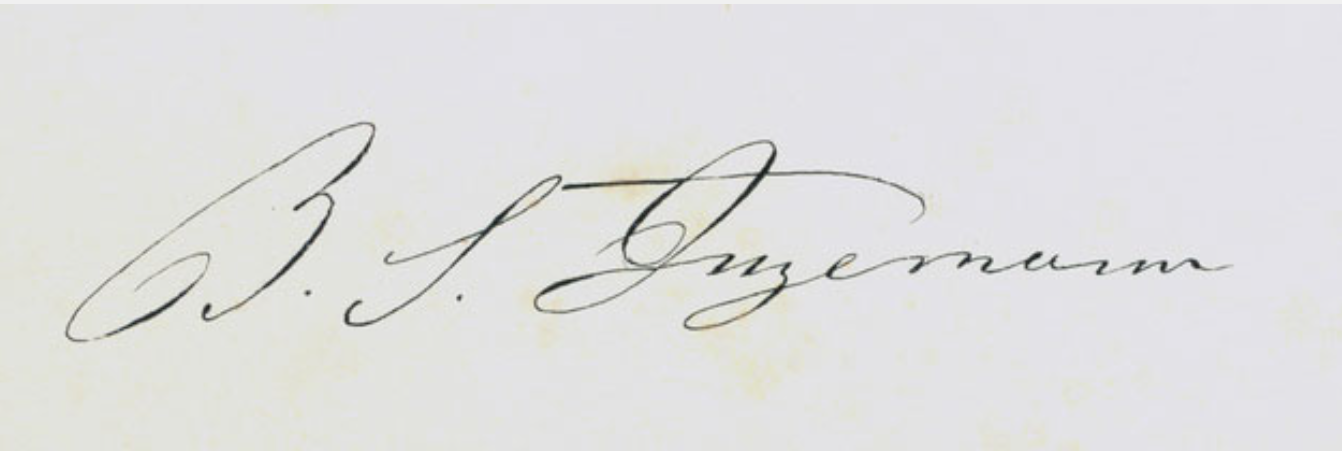

Bernhard Severin Ingemann (28 May 1789 – 24 February 1862) was a Danish novelist and poet.

== Biography ==
Ingemann was born in Torkilstrup, on the island of Falster, Denmark. The son of a vicar, he was left fatherless in his youth.

He attended Slagelse Latin school with the chemist William Christopher Zeise and the poet Christian Hviid Bredahl. While a student at the University of Copenhagen he published his first collection of poems (1811; vol. ii., 1812), which show great influence of German romanticism. Critics describe their sickly sentimentality as reflecting the unhealthy condition of the poet's body and mind at this time. These works were followed by a long allegorical poem, De sorte Riddere (The Black Knights, 1814), which closed his first period.

Then followed six plays, of which the best is considered to be Reinald Underbarnet (The Miraculous Child Reinald, 1816), and the most popular, Blanca, (1815). In 1817 he published his first prose work, De Underjordiske, et bornholmsk Eventyr (The Subterranean Ones, a Story of Bornholm), which was followed in 1820 by Eventyr og Fortællinger (Narratives and Miraculous Tales), many of them imitations of Hoffmann. During 1818–19 he traveled on the Continent.

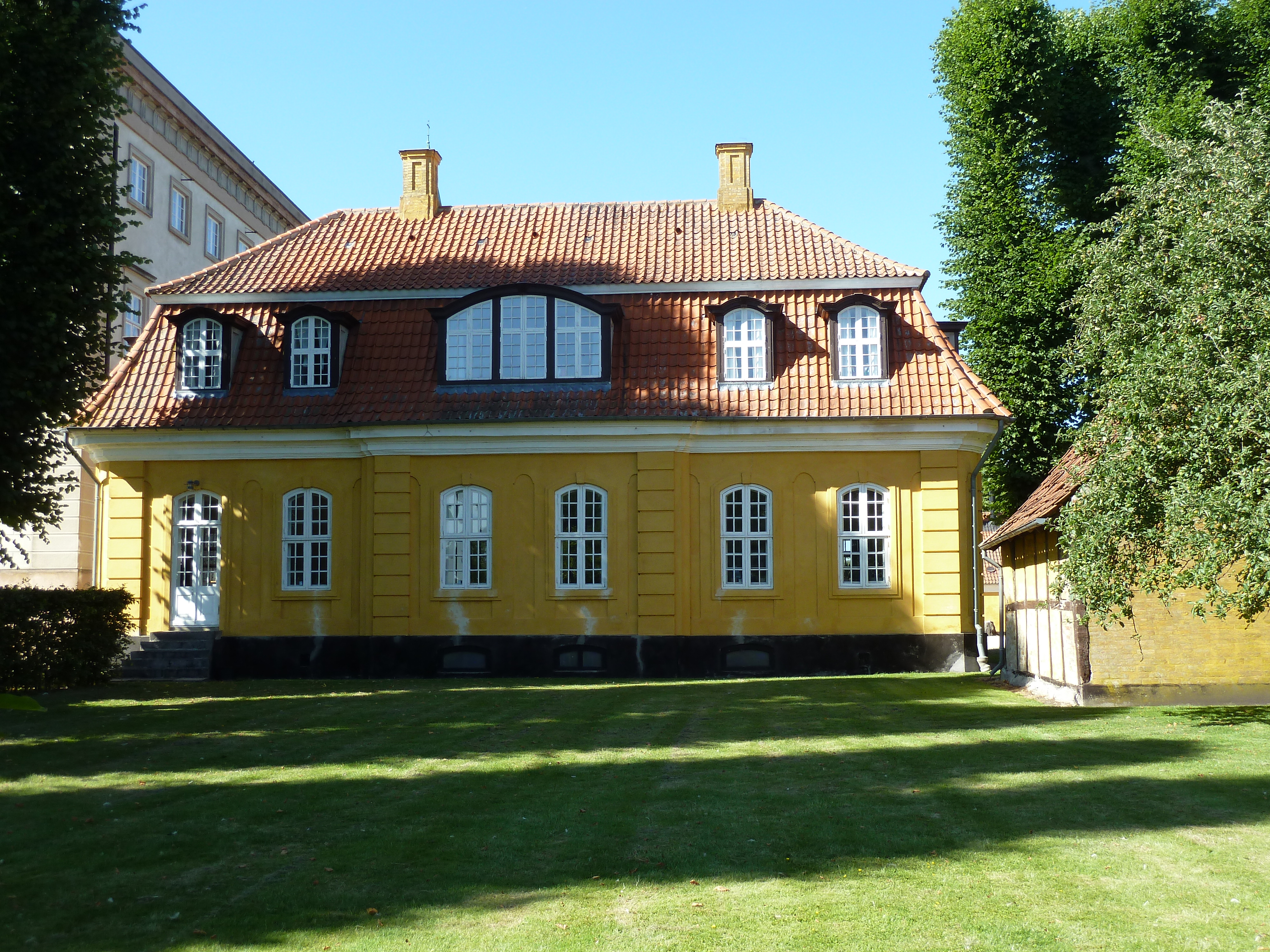
The Ingemann House at Sorø Academy in Sorø

In 1822 he was appointed instructor of the Danish Language and Literature at the Academy of Sorø. During his next period, inspired by Scott's Waverley novels, Ingemann produced his series of historical romances, by virtue of which he disputes with H. C. Andersen the title of the children's writer of Denmark. Their subjects are all taken from Danish history. The first, and perhaps the best, is Valdemar Sejr (Valdemar the Victorious, 1826), which was followed by Erik Menveds Barndom (Erik Menved's Childhood, 1828); Kong Erik og de Fredløse (King Erik and the Outlaws, 1833); and Prins Otto af Danmark og Hans Samtid (Prince Otto of Denmark and his Time, 1835).

While his historical romances show a lack of accuracy, their strong nationality gives them a special interest to the student of Danish culture. In reality they mean the introduction of the historical novel in Danish literature. A later artistic novel Landsbybørnene from 1852 ("The Village Children") is now almost forgotten.

Known as the fourth great Danish hymn writer (after Kingo, Brorson and Grundtvig), Ingemann is considered less rooted in Biblical dogma and more borne up by a general spiritual and religious interest. A simple naivete runs through them. Especially popular were his Morgen og Aftensange (Morning and Evening Songs), a collection of religious poems of great beauty and spirituality written during 1837–39. They were set to music by the composer Weyse. Many of them have been classics in Danish schools (for instance I Østen stiger Solen op – "In the East the Sun rises" and Fred hviler over Land og By – "Peace is resting over Land and Town"). Also his Christmas hymns are popular. He also wrote poems of historic and mythological content in the heroic saga Holger Danske ("Ogier the Dane", 1837).

He was a personal friend of Grundtvig who was in some degrees his mentor and with whom he shared a deep interest of Danish medieval history. Often they have been regarded almost mental twins in spite of clear differences. Also Blicher and H. C. Andersen must be mentioned among his friends.

Ingemann was in his elder years much respected and after the death of Oehlenschläger he was regarded the unofficial poet-king of Denmark. Critics cite Ingemann's grace and delicacy, rather than strength, of style, both in prose and poetry. He died in Sorø.

Ingemann was married to Lucie Marie Mandix (1792–1868), a painter, whose works still hang in Danish churches.

== Written works ==
=== Songs ===
- I sne står urt og busk i skjul (1831)
- I alle de riger og lande (1837)
- I østen stiger solen op (1837)
- Lysets engel går med glans (1837)
- Nu titte til hinanden (1837)
- Dagen går med raske fjed (1838)
- Julen har bragt velsignet bud (1839)
- Den store mester kommer (1841)
- Stork! stork! Langeben! (1842)
- Dejlig er jorden (1850)
- Glade jul, dejlige jul (1850)
- Julen har englelyd (1569)
- Nu vågne alle Guds fugle små (1837)

=== Short stories ===
- Eventyr og Fortællinger (1820)
- Glasskabet (1847)

=== Epic poems ===
- Valdemar den Store og hans Mænd (1824)
- Dronning Margrete (1836)
- Holger Danske (1837)

=== Novels ===
- Valdemar Seier (1826)
- Erik Menveds Barndom (1828)
- Kong Erik og de Fredløse (1833)
- Prinds Otto af Danmark (1834)
