= Lucie Ingemann =

Danish painter (1792–1868)

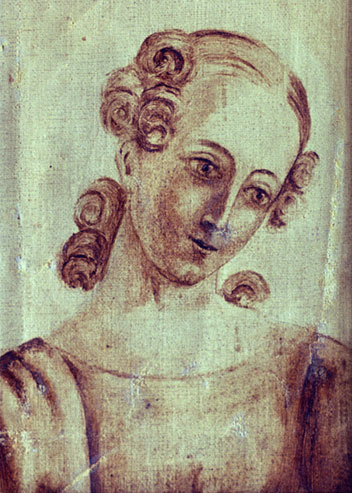
Lucie Ingemann, self-portrait

Lucie Maria Ingemann (née Mandix; 19 February 1792 – 15 January 1868) was a Danish painter who is best known for her large altarpieces depicting biblical figures, many of which are displayed in Denmark's churches.

== Early life ==
The daughter of Margaretha Elisabeth Hvistendahl (1756–1816) and economist Jacob Mandix (1758–1831), Lucie Marie Mandix was born on 19 February 1792 in Copenhagen. She was taught painting by the Danish flower painter Cladius Detlev Fritzsch. There also are records of her painting in Christoffer Wilhelm Eckersberg's studio. When she was 20, she was engaged to the writer Bernhard Severin Ingemann, whom she married in July 1822. They lived in Sorø, where they entertained other Danish cultural figures such as Hans Christian Andersen and Bertel Thorvaldsen. Bernhard Ingemann, who wrote poetry, supported Lucie's interest in painting.

== Career ==
Although Ingemann painted a few portraits and genre works, she concentrated mainly on flower paintings and, from the mid-1820s, on religious figures. She showed at the Charlottenborg Spring Exhibition in 1824 and 1826, in both cases presenting flower paintings. She shared with her husband a deep sense of art and religion with the result that even her flower paintings often reflected religious and mystical themes inspired by German Romanticism. Her large biblical compositions and altar paintings are convincing, perhaps thanks to the guidance of Johan Ludwig Lund. In some cases she abandons perspective in favour of a spaciousness depicting spiritual mystery. Her many religious works were integrated in altarpieces in Danish churches, although many have now been removed.

Ingemann is one of the few known nineteenth-century women who devoted her life to painting. She also played an important role in the Ingemanns' home despite the fact that references to her come mainly from accounts of her husband's life.

== Death ==
Lucie Ingemann died in Sorø on 15 January 1868.
