= Tuhat Laulujen Vuotta =

Poetry collection by Aale Tynni published in 1957

Book cover

Tuhat Laulujen Vuotta is a 1957 poetry collection by Finnish poet and translator Aale Tynni.

It is a Finnish translation; a comprehensive anthology of a large scope of European poetry ranging from the Middle Ages
