= Julen har bragt velsignet bud =

Danish Christmas hymn

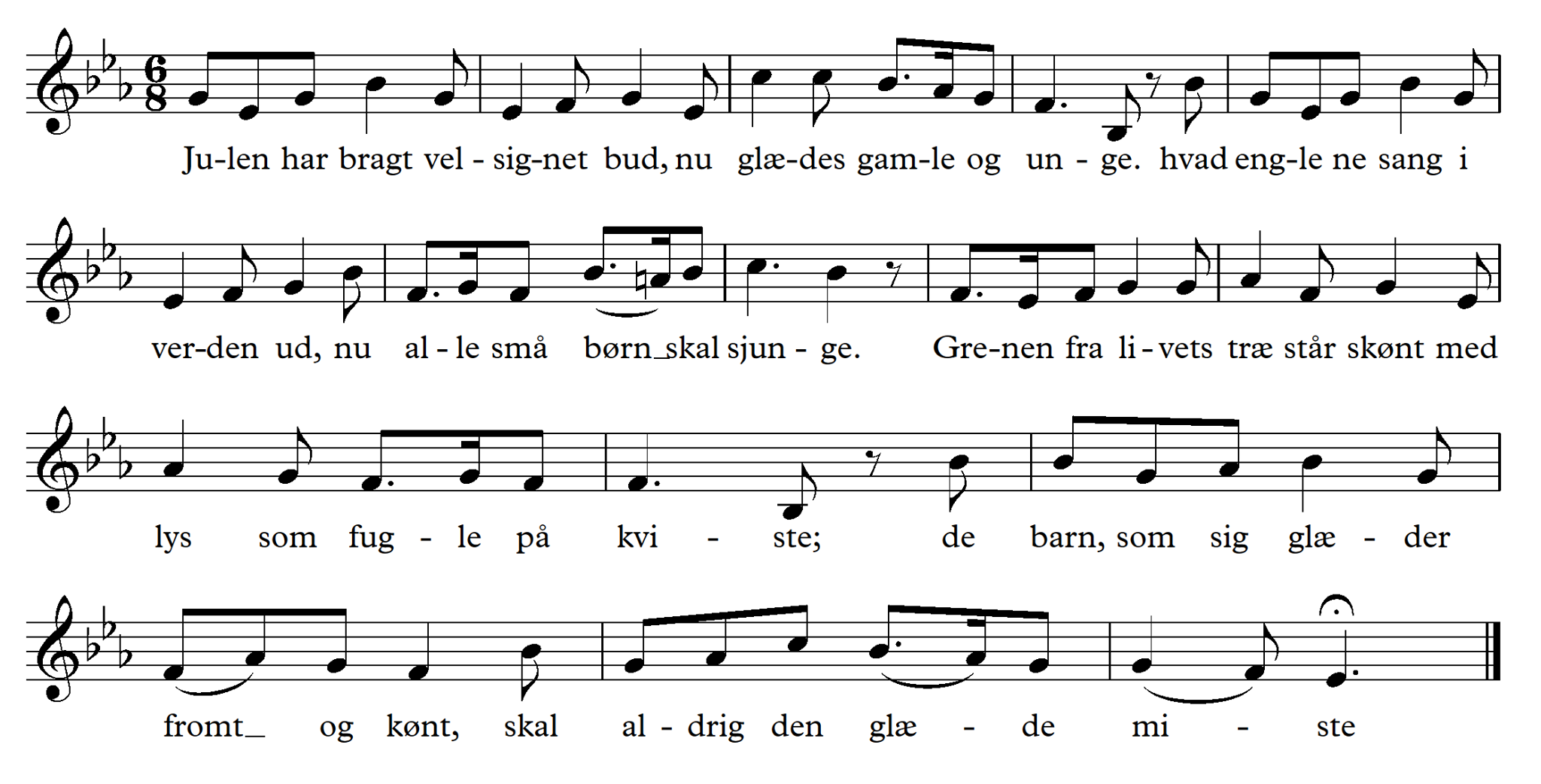
Julen har bragt velsignet bud

Julen har bragt velsignet bud is a popular Danish Christmas hymn, written for children by Bernhard Severin Ingemann in 1839. A melody was arranged by C.E.F. Weyse in 1841.

== Lyrics ==
1. Julen har bragt velsignet bud,
nu glædes gamle og unge.
Hvad englene sang i verden ud,
nu alle små børn skal sjunge.
Grenen fra livets træ står skønt
med lys som fugle på kviste;
det barn, som sig glæder fromt og kønt,
skal aldrig den glæde miste.

2. Glæden er jordens gæst i dag
med Himmel-kongen, den lille.
Du fattige spurv, flyv ned fra tag
med duen til julegilde!
Dans, lille barn, på moders skød!
En dejlig dag er oprunden:
I dag blev vor kære frelser fød
og Paradis-vejen funden.

3. Frelseren selv var barn som vi,
i dag han lå i sin vugge.
Den have, Guds engle flyve i,
vil Jesus for os oplukke.
Himmerigs konge blandt os bor,
han juleglæden os bringer;
han favner hver barnesjæl på jord
og lover os englevinger.11
