= Lehtimaja =

1946 Finnish poetry collection

Lehtimaja is a 1946 poetry collection by Finnish poet and translator Aale Tynni.

== Extract ==
"I'm still young, and I awake rejoicing,

as amazing morning shines at my window.

My heart is pounding with happy loving

Oh my land, I love the look of you so."

(from 'Summer Morning,' in Lehtimaja, 1946)
