= Aale Tynni =

Finnish poet (1913–1997)

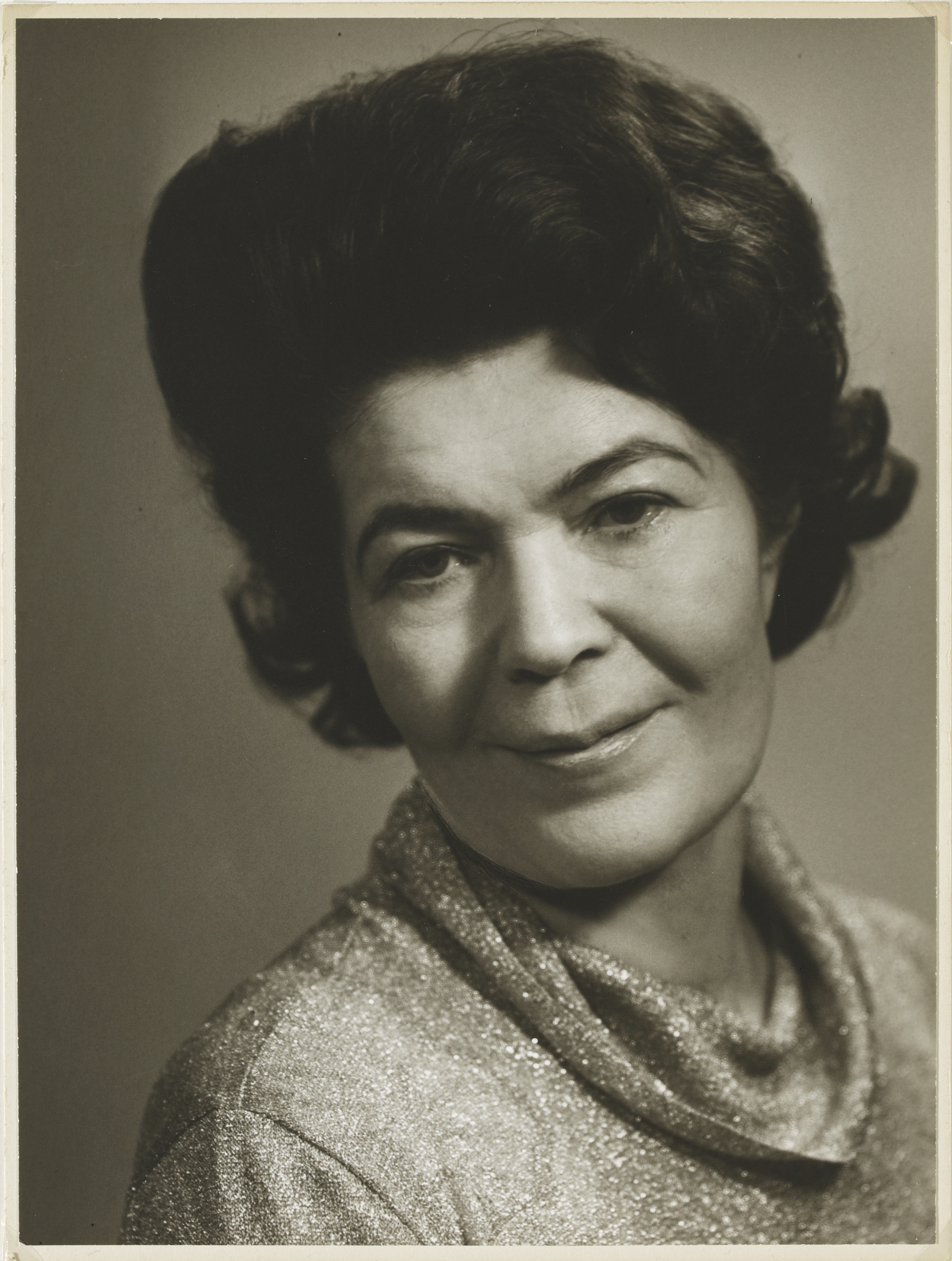
- Born: Aale Maria Tynni; 3 October 1913; Ingria
- Died: 21 October 1997 (aged 84)

Olympic medal record

Art competitions
Gold medal – first place	1948 London	Lyric

Aale Maria Tynni-Haavio (3 October 1913 – 21 October 1997) was a Finnish poet and translator. She is best known for editing and translating European poetry ranging from the Middle Ages into Finnish in a comprehensive anthology entitled Tuhat Laulujen Vuotta in 1957. She participated in the Art Competitions of the 1948 Summer Olympics in London, and won the gold medal in the Lyric Works, Literature category for "Laurel of Hellas".

== Biography ==
Tynni was born in Ingria into an Ingrian Finnish family. She married fellow poet Martti Haavio, her second husband, in 1960. After he died in 1973, Tynni and Katariina Eskola compiled his notes and correspondence, which were later released as a series of books.

She is buried in the Hietaniemi Cemetery in Helsinki.

== Works ==
- Kynttiläsydän, 1938
- Vesilintu, 1940
- Lähde ja matkamies, 1943
- Lehtimaja, 1946
- Soiva metsä, 1947
- Ylitse vuorten lasisten, 1949
- Tuntematon puu, 1952
- Kerttu ja Perttu ja muut talon lapset, 1953
- Kissa liukkaalla jäällä ja muita satuja, 1954
- Torni virrassa, 1954
- Vieraana vihreällä saarella, 1954
- Heikin salaisuudet, 1956
- Tuhat laulujen vuotta, 1957
- Yhdeksän kaupunkia, 1958
- Maailmanteatteri, 1961
- Muuttohaukat, 1965
- Balladeja ja romansseja, 1967
- Lasten paratiisi, 1968
- Pidä rastaan laulusta kiinni, 1969
- Tarinain lähde, 1974
- Olen vielä kaukana, 1978
- Vuodenajat, 1987
- Inkeri, Inkerini, 1990
- Rautamarskin aika, 1991 (näytelmä)
