= Lahde (surname) =

Lahde or Lähde is the surname of the following people:

- Andrew Lahde (born 1971), American financier
- Gerhard Ludvig Lahde (1765–1833), Danish printmaker and publisher
- Jari Lähde (born 1963), Finnish cyclist
- Juho Lähde (born 1991), Finnish footballer
- Matti Lähde (1911–1978), Finnish cross-country skier
- Nestori Lähde (born 1989), Finnish ice hockey player
