= Nicolai Dajon =

Nicolai Dejon
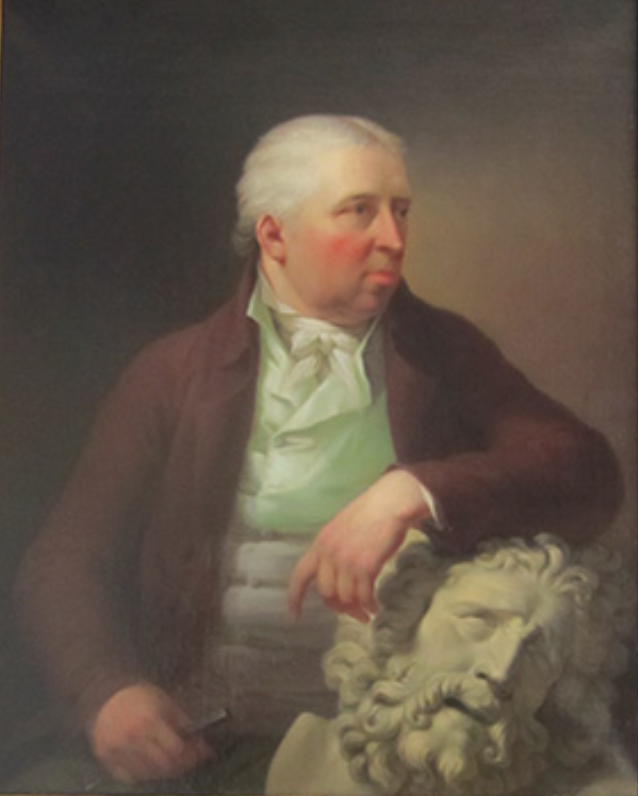
- Dajon painted by Hans Hansen, 1809
- Born: January 21, 1748; Copenhagen, Denmark
- Died: June 4, 1809 (aged 61); Copenhagen, Denmark
- Resting place: Assistens Cemetery, Copenhagen
- Education: Royal Danish Academy of Art
- Known for: Sculpture

Nicolai Dajon (21 January 1748 – 14 December 1823) was a Danish sculptor. He served as director of the Royal Danish Academy of Fine Arts from 1818 to 1821.

== Life ==
=== Early life and education ===
Dajon was born on 21 January 1748 in Copenhagen, the son of building administrator Frantz Dajon (1719–94) and Agnete Plum (1718–87). His family was of French origin but had been present in Denmark from at least 1624 and had for several generations counted members in royal service. He trained as a sculptor under Jacques Saly at the Royal Danish Academy of Fine Arts from 1759 and won its large gold medal for the relief Israeliterne samle Manna i Ørken in 1766.

=== Career ===
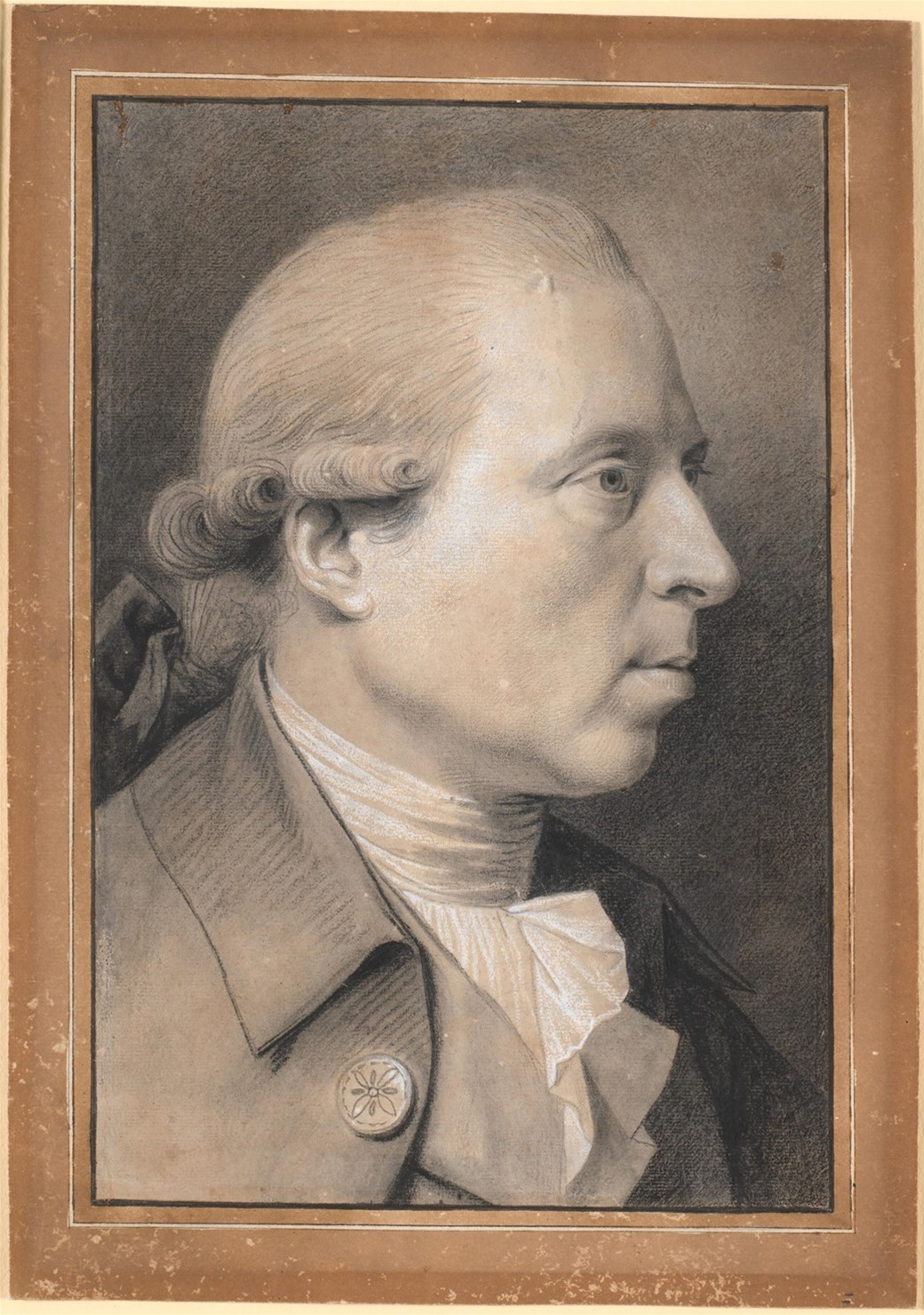
Jens Juel: Portrait of the sculptor Nicolai Dajon, 1780s

Dajon began his career as an employee in Johannes Wiedewelt's studio. Although he received promise of a travel stipend in conjunction with the gold medal, the actual funds would not be made available until 1776. He made his way over Germany to Italy. In 1778, he sent a now lost statue of Paris in half natural size back to Denmark.

He returned to Denmark in 1781 and was in 1783 admitted as member of the Academy. His admission piece was an allegorical representation of the Baltic Sea in the form of a reclined figure. It was difficult times for a young sculptor since the few major commissions all went to Wiedewelt, and Dajon, therefore, had to survive on a small income by teaching moulding at the Academy's decoration school.

In 1803, after Wiedewelt's death, he was finally appointed as professor at the Academy. The position came with a studio in Civiletatens Materialgård at Frederiksholms Kanal.. Dajon served as director of the Academy from 1818 to 1821.

=== Death ===
He died on 14 December 1823 and is buried in Assistens Cemetery.

== Works ==
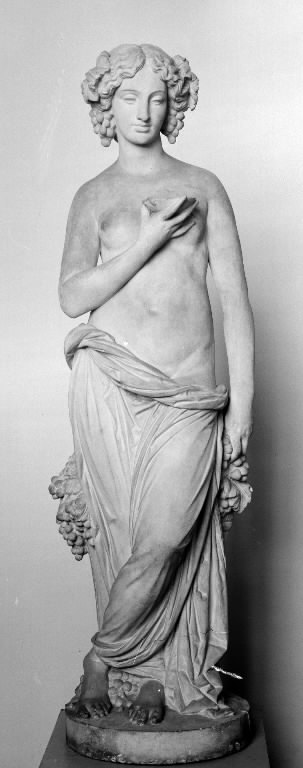
Dajon: Autumn, 1783

Dajon has only left a relatively small body of work. His best works are from the 1780s and 1790s. His style remained more closely influenced by his training under Saly than the Classicism that would later become fashionable. His works from this period include the allegorical sculptures of Spring, Summer and Autumn for Vodroffslund (now in the Danish National Gallery), Tapperhed and Borgerdyd for the Liberty Column (possibly after Nicolai Abildgaard's sketches).

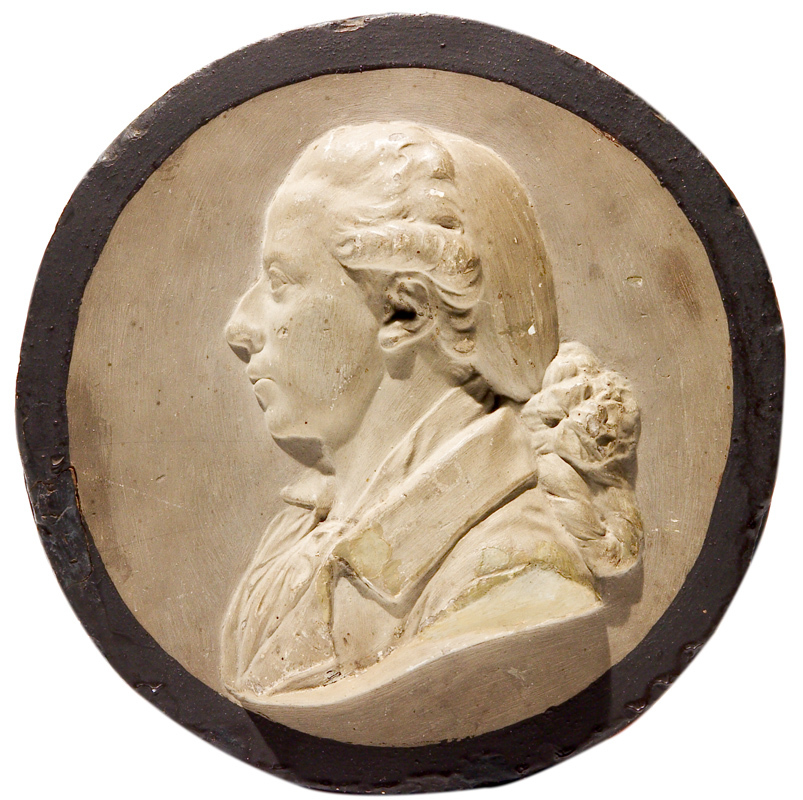
Jens Lowson by Nicolai Dajon, 1786

He has also created a number of portrait busts and reliefs. These include a portrait bust of Crown Prince Frederick from 1783 (Sorø Academy). His marble bust of A. P. Bernstorff created for Landhusholdningsselskabet (now Frederiksborg Museum) is believed to be a copy of Bertel Thorvaldsen's Bernstorff bust, although it may also be the other way round. He has for instance created portrait medallions of A. C. Hviid (Regensen), Jens Low-zon (Danish National Gallery) and Christian VII (Christiansborg Court Theatre). A bust of Ludvig Holberg (1784) is now located in the Royal Danish Theatre.

After the turn of the century, his work was almost exclusively confined to grave monuments of heterogeneous artistic quality. A number of these are located in Assistens Cemetery. He would occasionally also receive a portrait commission. A couple of times he would also collaborate with other artists on decorative assignments. He collaborated with Nicolai Abildgaard on the memorial decorations for Frederik VI and the Battle of Copenhagen (Slaget paa Reden) at Nørrejylland's arsenal in Randers (c. 1805) and with Peder Malling on the monument to Tordenskjold in the Church of Holmen. His portrait relief of the naval hero was based on Balthasar Denner's portrait painting.

== Gallery ==
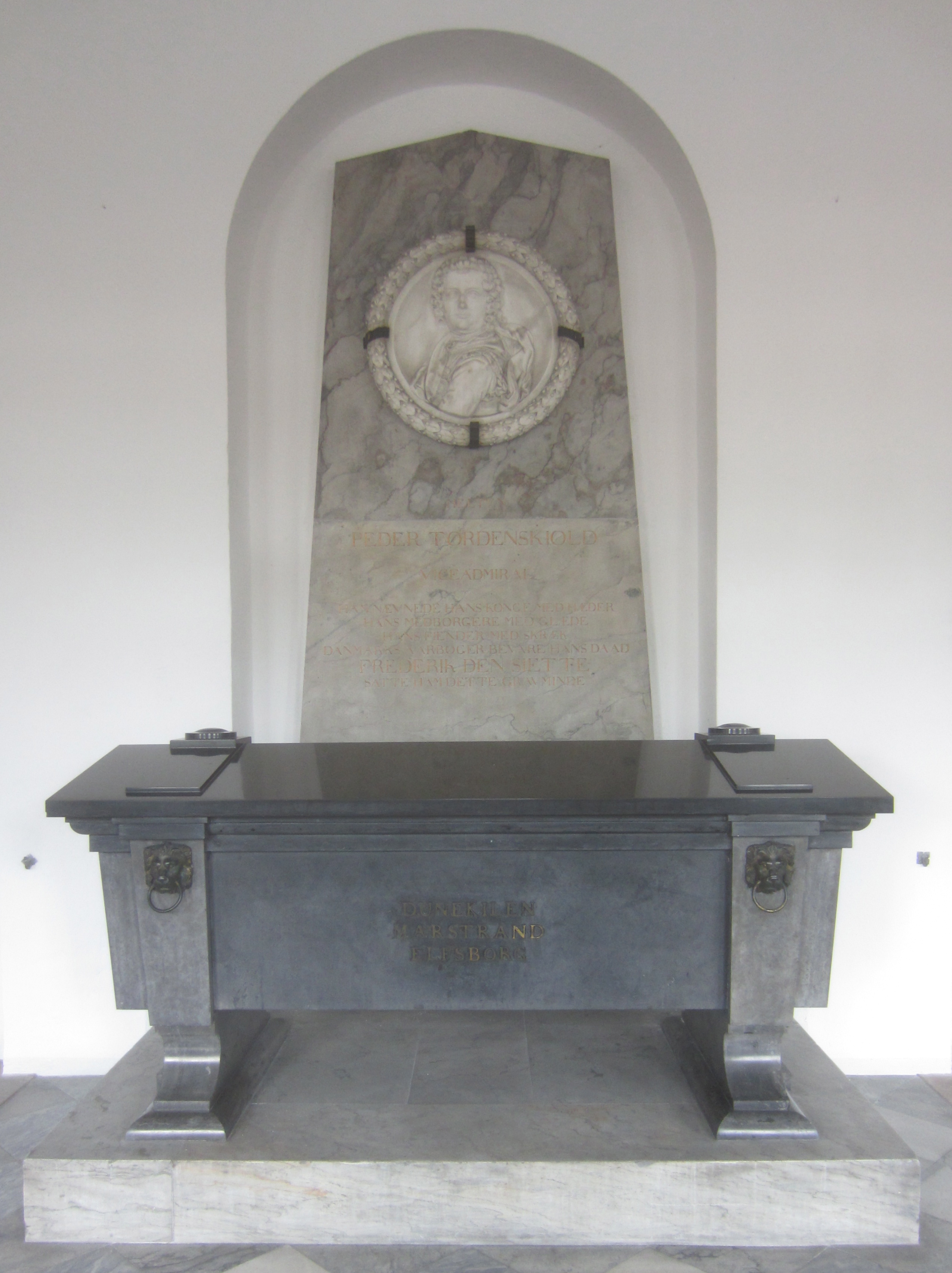
Tordenskiolds Monument, Church of Holmen, Copenhagen

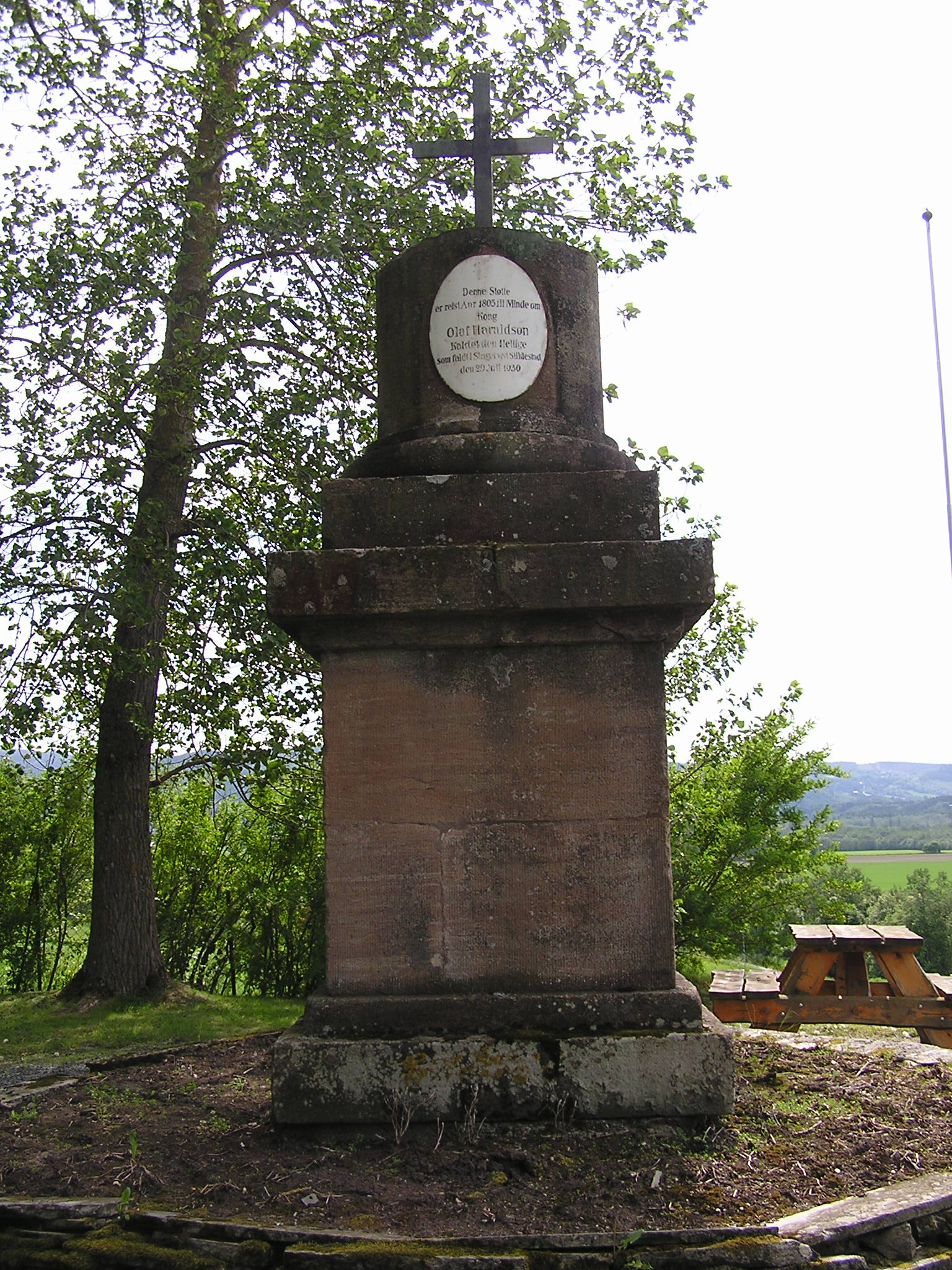
Olaf Monument, Stiklestad, Norway

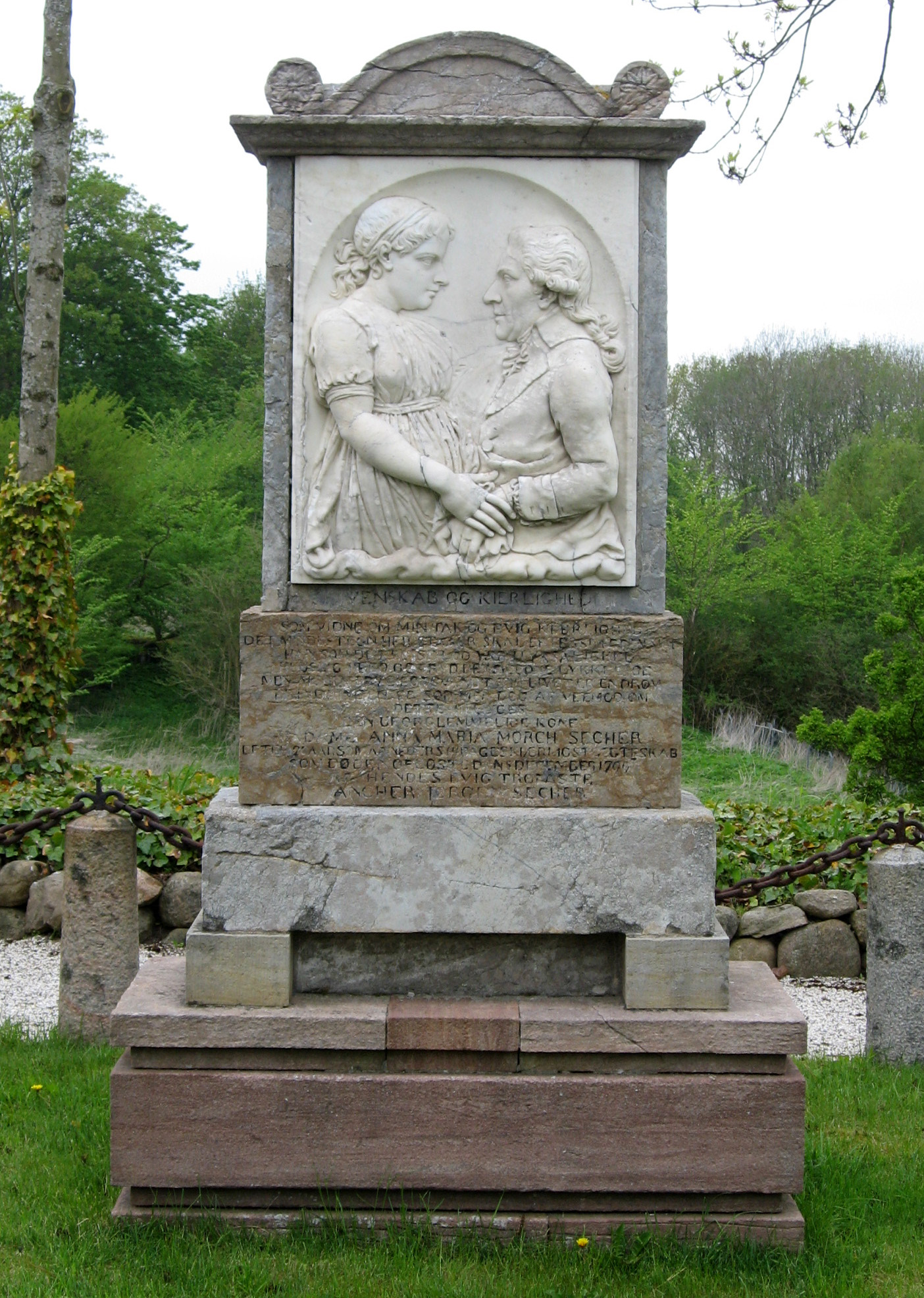
Memorial, Kasted Cemetery, Denmark

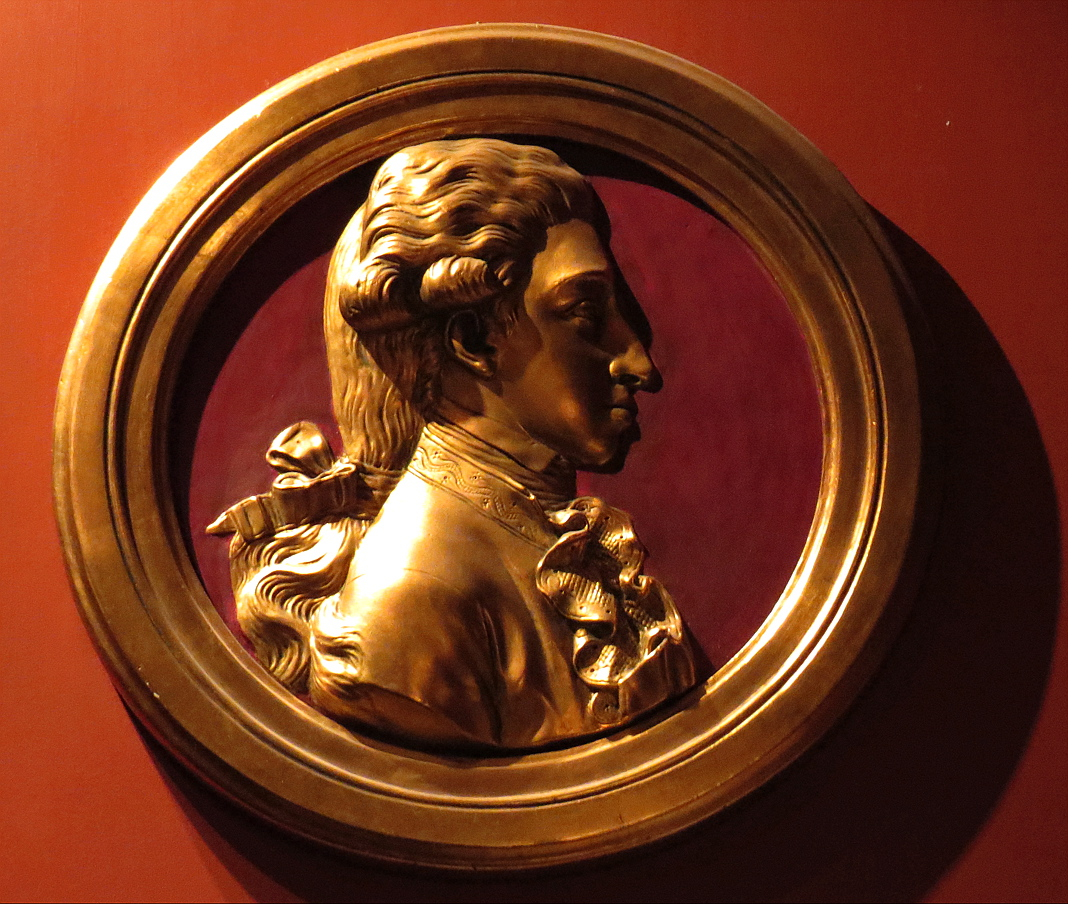
Christian VIII, Christiansborg Court Theatre, Copenhagen

Cultural offices
Preceded by Christian Frederik Hansen	Director of the Royal Danish Academy of Fine Arts; 1818–1921	Succeeded by Christian Frederik Hansen
