= Kynttiläsydän =

1938 poetry collection by Aale Tynni

Kynttiläsydän is a 1938 Finnish poetry collection by Finnish poet and translator Aale Tynni. The collection was chiefly written in 1936 and published in 1938 became her first written work.

== Sources ==
- Petri Liukkonen. "Aale Tynni". Books and Writers.
