= Cladius Detlev Fritzsch =

Danish painter (1765–1841)

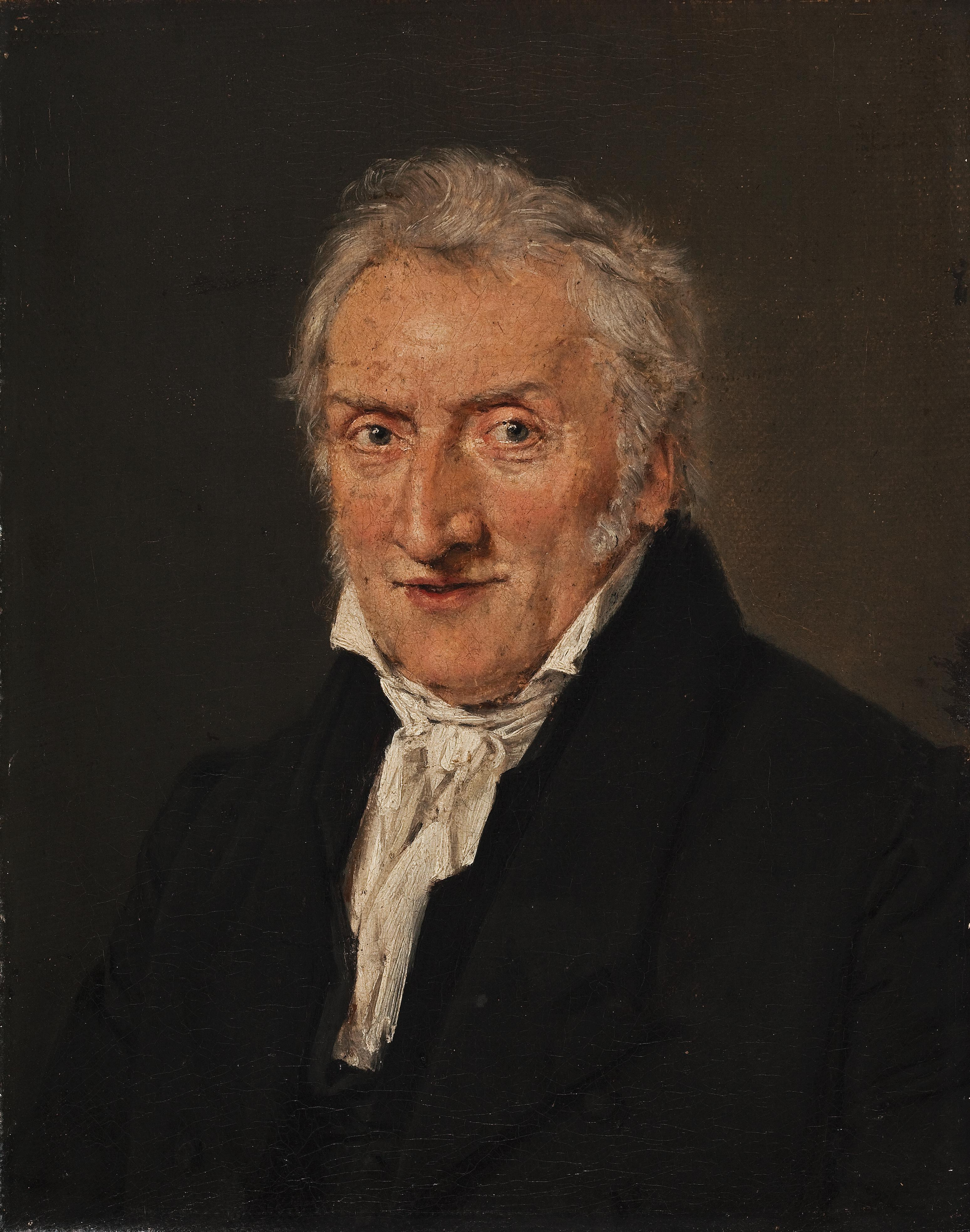
Cladius Detlev Fritzsch painted in his old age, around 1835, by Christian Albrecht Jensen. Thorvaldsens Museum

Cladius (Claus) Detlev Fritzsch (10 June 1765 – 17 November 1841), normally referred to as C. D. Fritzsch, was a Danish flower painter.

== Biography ==
Fritzsch was born on 10 June 1765 in Kiel. He traveled to Copenhagen and attended the Royal Danish Academy of Fine Arts from 1786, winning its small silver medal in 1790. He first worked in watercolour and gouache before turning to oil painting. Among his friends at the Academy were Bertel Thorvaldsen, the painter and engraver Heinrich Grosch and Carl Probsthayn. According to Thorvaldsen's records, it was Fritzsch and Grosch who first endorsed him to compete for the Academy's large gold medal. Several times he applied for travel scholarships. Some sources state that he may finally have gone on a journey in 1803 but most likely he never made it abroad.

During his student years, Fritzsch made many drawings of street life in Copenhagen, many of which with a satirical edge. He also depicted the fire of Christiansborg Palace in 1794 and the Copenhagen Fire of 1795. Some of his gouaches from the fires were made into engraving by Gerhard Ludvig Lahde with whom he collaborated on a regular basis. However, he chose to specialize in flower painting, a discipline which he dedicated the rest of his career to, and was in 1804 referred to as "the best and only painter within his field". He was accepted as a member of the Academy in 1806 and was afforded residency at Charlottenborg in 1827.

== Works ==
His paintings were popular both with Frederik VI and Christian VIII and several of his works now in the Danish National Gallery must, due to their size, originally have served as room decoration. Seven semi-circular door pieces with flower motifs in Holstein's Mansion in Copenhagen are also attributed to him. They were executed in connection with Jørgen Hansen Koch's redesign of the building for the King in the late 1820s. It was supposed to serve as a residence for Princess Caroline, who was a pupil and admirer of Fritzsch, and Prince Ferdinand after their marriage.

As the teacher of Johannes Ludvig Camradt, Fritzsch influenced later and more famous Danish flower painters.

== Gallery ==
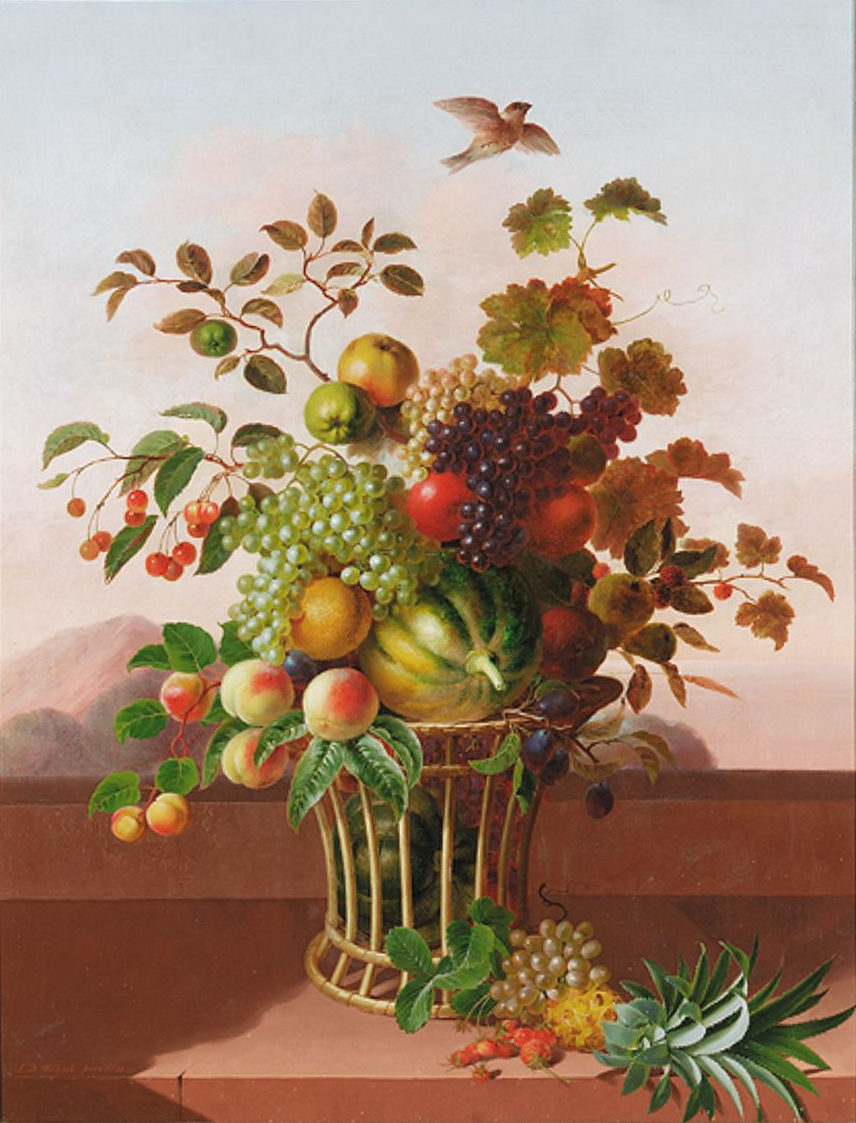
Melons, Peaches, Grapes, and Cherries, 1819

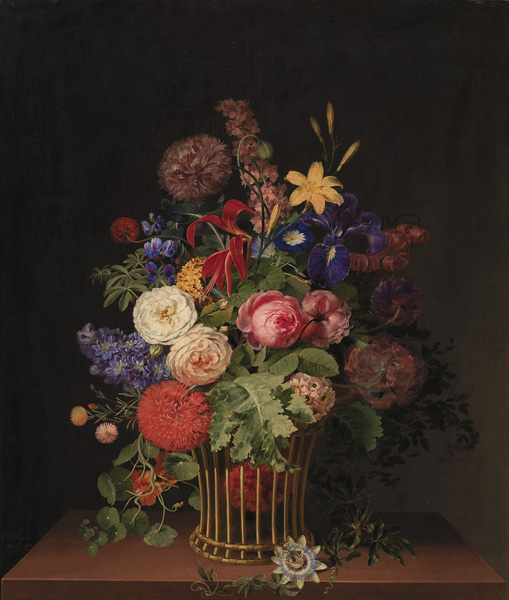
A Light Pipe Basket with Flowers, 1808

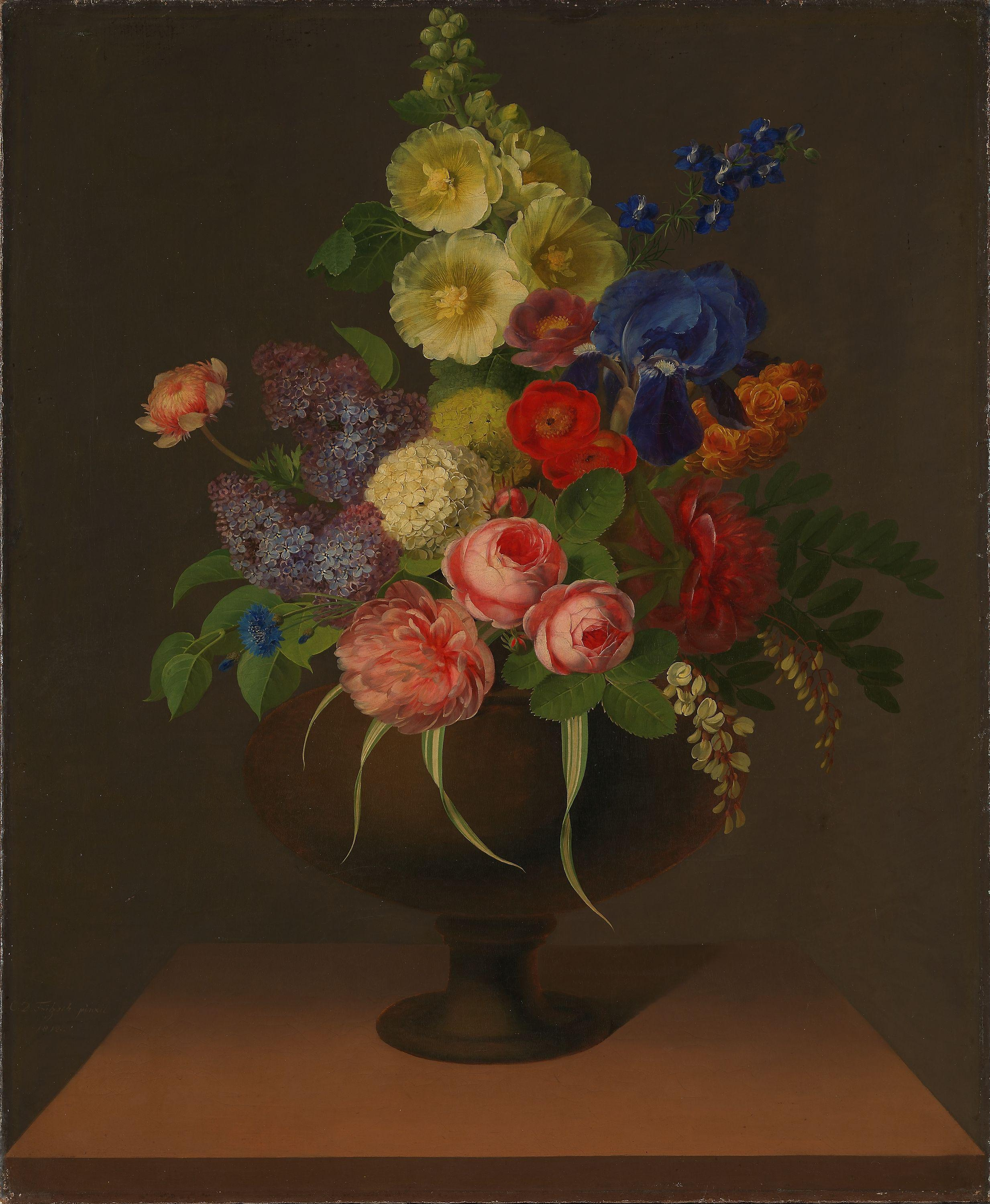
Flower Piece, 1812

== See also ==
- Art of Denmark
