= Tarinain lähde =

1974 poetry collection by Aale Tynni

Tarinain lähde is a 1974 poetry collection by Finnish poet and translator Aale Tynni.
