= Christoph Ernst Friedrich Weyse =

Danish composer (1774–1842)

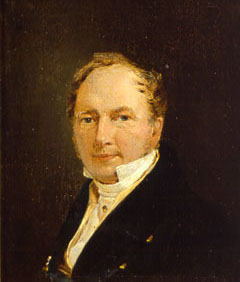
C. E. F. Weyse, painted by C. A. Jensen

Gud ske tak og lov (‘Thanks and praises be unto God’)
Instrumental version, performed by Erik Damskier on piano

Christoph(er) Ernst Friedrich Weyse (5 March 1774 – 8 October 1842) was a Danish composer during the Danish Golden Age.

== Biography ==
Weyse was born at Altona in Holstein, which was in a personal union with Denmark. He gained much interest in music in his hometown and Hamburg, where C. P. E. Bach was the municipal director of music. At age fifteen (1789), Weyse was sent to live with his uncle in Copenhagen to be educated, and lived there for the rest of his life. While in Copenhagen, he studied music with Johann Abraham Peter Schulz. Schulz helped Weyse get an unpaid internship at the Reformed Church in Copenhagen. In 1794, he was appointed organist at the same church following the former organist's death. He later served in the same post at the Vor Frue Kirke after 1805. In 1819, he was appointed court composer. He died in Copenhagen.

== Works ==
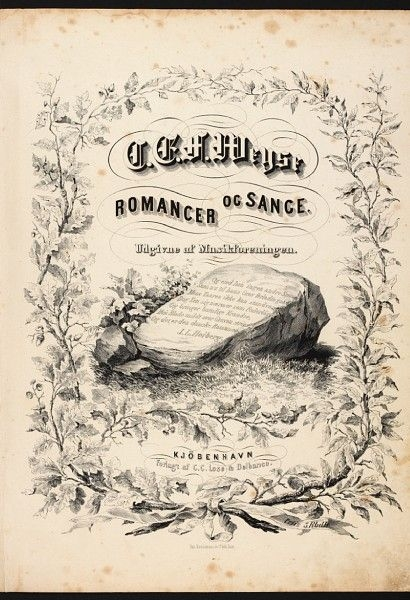
Title page of Romancer og Sange (published 1853)

He was best known for his vocal works, which included numerous singspiele, Christmas carols, a setting of the Te Deum and of the Miserere, over 30 cantatas, and above all, lieder after poems by Matthias Claudius, Johann Heinrich Voss and Ludwig Christoph Heinrich Hölty. He also composed seven symphonies and numerous pieces for solo piano. A part of one of his works opens the "Cat's Duet" or "Duetto buffo di due gatti" usually attributed to Rossini.

=== Cantatas ===
Unlike Johann Sebastian Bach’s cantatas, Weyse's cantatas were designed to be played after the service, rather than used as liturgical music during the service.

His Easter Cantata No. 1, Hil dig, hil dig, livets morgenrøde, was written in 1836 and its words are based on works by poet Thomas Thaarup. The work premiered on 22 April in Trinitatis Church.

=== Singspiel ===
- Sovedrikken (1809)
- Faruk (1812)
- Ludlams Hule (1816)
- Floribella (1825)
- Et Eventyr i Rosenborg Have (1827)
- Festen på Kenilworth (1836)

=== Songs ===
- Julen har bragt velsignet bud (1841)
