= Gerhard Ludvig Lahde =

Danish printmaker and publisher

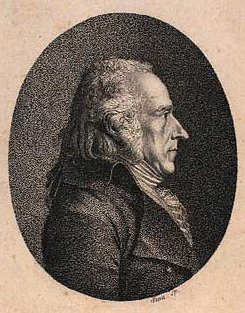
- Born: 19 October 1765; Bremen
- Died: 30 November 1833 (aged 68); Copenhagen, Denmark
- Known for: Painting

Gerhard Ludvig Lahde (19 October 1765 – 30 November 1833), usually referred to as G. L. Lahde, was a Danish printmaker and publisher. He is remembered for his hand-coloured, slightly caricatured series of prints of traditional costumes created in collaboration with Johannes Senn as well as depictions of major historic events such as the Copenhagen Fire of 1795 and the British bombardments of Copenhagen in 1801 and 1807. He also created many portraits of prominent people of his time.

== Early life and education ==
Lahde was born in Bremen, the son of a tailor. After studying seven years in the local Latin school, he went to Kiel where he completed an apprenticeship as a goldsmith. With ambitions to become an artist, together with Cladius Detlev Fritzsch, he then travelled to Copenhagen where he was admitted to the Royal Danish Academy of Fine Arts in 1787. He completed model school and was taught the craft of copperprint engraving by Johann Friderich Clemens. He won the small silver medal in 1790, the large silver medal in 1791 and the small gold medal in 1792. He initially worked as a goldsmith to pay for his education but without much economic success and later turned to drawing and engraving portraits. Although his original plan was to return to Bremen and he received some economic support from his home town to do so, he decided instead to stay in Copenhagen where he was naturalized in 1792.

Lahde's academic career was without much success. In 1793, he tried to obtain status as agrée at the academy with an engraving based on Jens Juel's portrait of August Hennings and in 1796 again with an engraving based on Anton Graff's portrait of the Duke of Augustenborg.

== Career ==
He had more success commercially as a portrait painter and was appointed Engraver to the Danish Court in 1799. In 1803 he went abroad on a grant from Fonden ad usus publicos. In 1805 he purchased a property on Gothersgade from where he ran a successful business. Christoffer Wilhelm Eckersberg and Johannes Senn, who were The young artists at the time, lived in the building and worked for him.

== Works ==
In spite of his technical skill and ability to combine different graphic techniques, Lahde's works are generally more of historic and cultural historic than artistic value. Many were hand-coloured by his daughters or his assistants. They were often published by himself in "series" or books. They often depicted current events such as the fire of Christiansborg Palace in 1794, the Copenhagen Fire of 1795 and the Bombardments of Copenhagen in 1801 and 1807. Other works include street scenes from Copenhagen, portraits of prominent people and series with traditional costumes.

== Ladhe's "stambog" ==
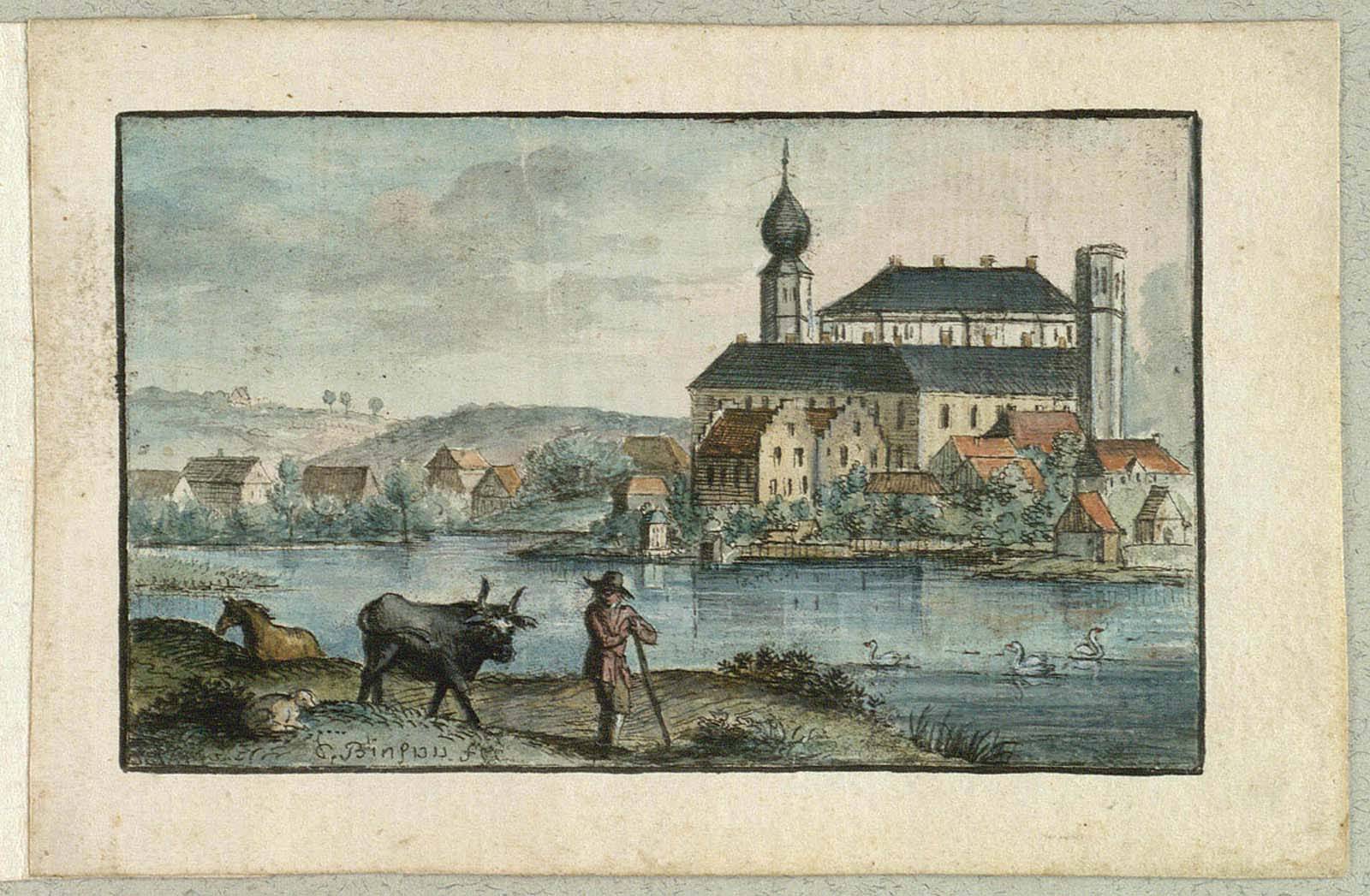
Drawing from Ladhe's "stambog"

Lahde's "stambog" I-II, now kept in the Royal Danish Library, is a sort of guestbook which he notebooks he had with him on travels where people he met could write or make drawings. Most of the texts, drawings and gouachernes are by young artists from the Art Academy, most of them unknown today but the two books contain drawings by F. Camradt, C. D. Fritsch, Hans Hansen, Johan Ludwig Lund, Elias Meyer, C. F. Stanley, Runge, Friedrich, Bertel Thorvaldsen and C. W. Eckersberg. Most of the drawings are of imaginary landscapes but some are of topographically identifiable scenes or portraits.

== Personal life ==
Lahde married Charlotte Dorothea Eleonore Werner in 1796. They remained married until Charlotte's death in 1803. He married Marie Tonnum in 1820. He had three children. He suffered a stroke in 1832 and died on 29 November 1833. He is buried at Assistens Cemetery.

== List of publications ==
- Samling af fortjente Mænds Portrailer, 1798–1806, ("Collection of Portraits of Men of Merit, published in collaboration with R. Nyerup 1798–1806")
- Mindesmærker paa Assistentskirkegaarden ved Kjøbenhavn, 1801–11 ("Memorials in Assistens Cemetery at Copenhagen, 1801-1811")
- Portrailer med Biographier ("Portraits with Biographies", 1805–06)
- Tolv Blade Figurer til Tegne-Øvelser efter Thorvaldsen (Twelf Sheets with Figures for Drawing Lessons after Thorvaldsen, 1814)
- Elementarværk i Tegnekunsten (1818–19)
- Klædedragter i København" udg ("Traditional costumes in Copenhagen# 1817-20)

== Gallery ==
=== Garments of Copenhagen ===
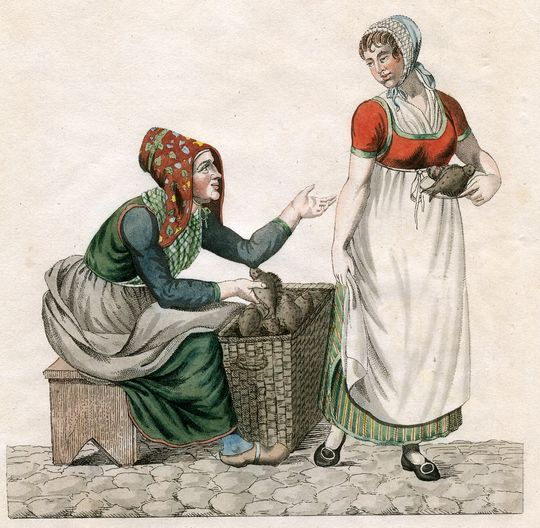
Skovser Women selling fish at Gammel Strand, c. 1800

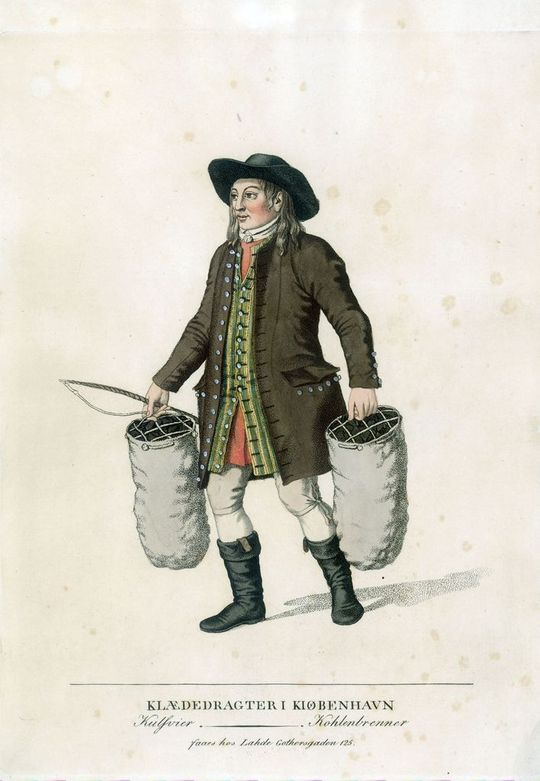
Collier at Kultorvet, c. 1805

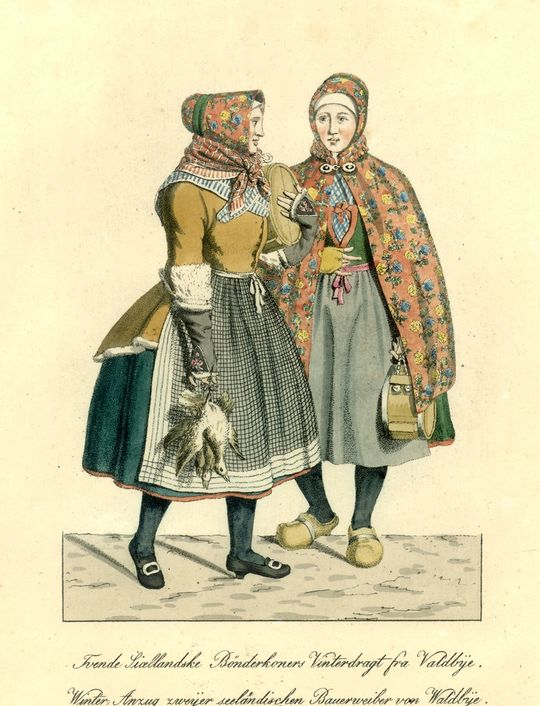
Valby Women selling poultry at Gammeltorv

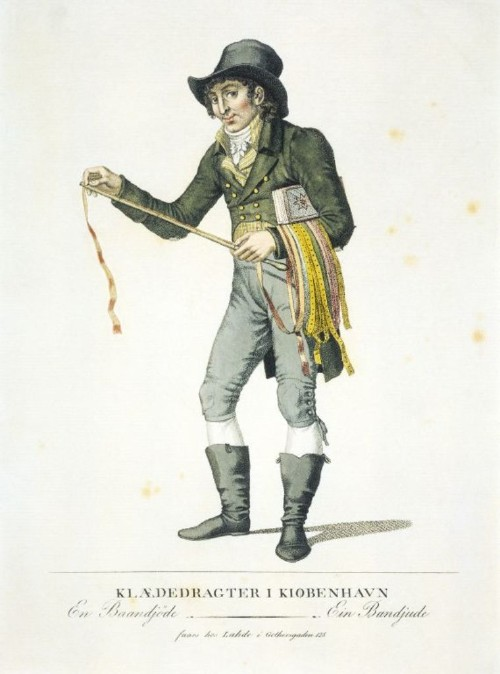
Jewish Man Selling Ribbon, so-called "Ribbon Jew"

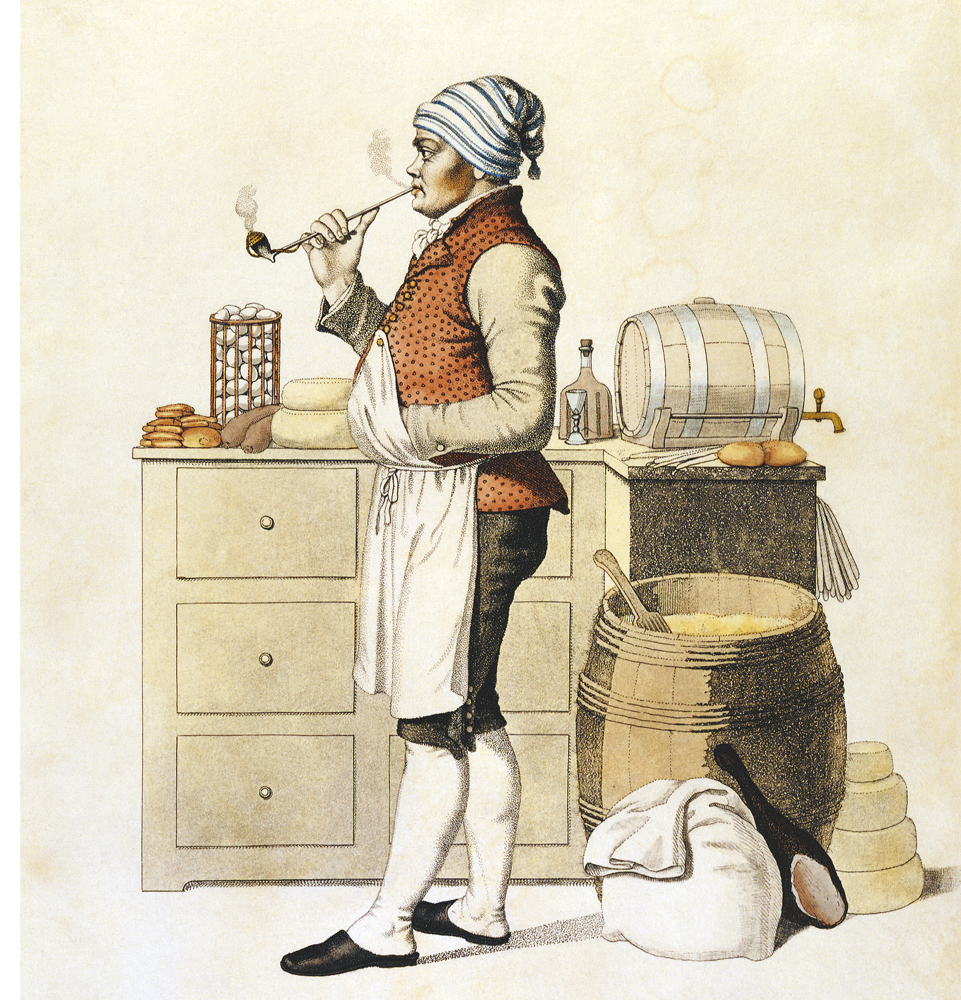
Grocer, c. 1920
