= Thomas Thaarup =

Danish poet (1749–1821)

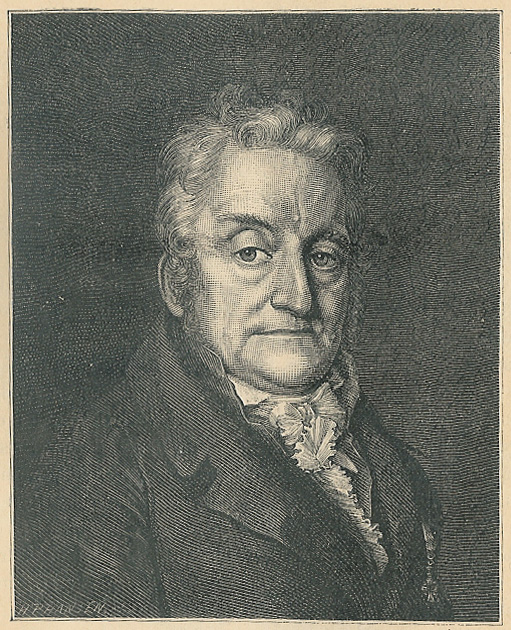
Portrait of Thomas Thaarup

Thomas Thaarup (21 August 1749 – 12 July 1821) was a Danish poet.

Thomas Thaarup was born in Copenhagen, where his father, Niels Thaarup, owned a hardware store. His mother's name was Anna Margaretha and her maiden name was Stupsack.

== Education ==
Though his family lived in Læsø, Thaarup was sent to a grammar school in Helsingør and went to Copenhagen University in 1768.

== Works ==
Thaarup wrote the libretto to C.E.F. Weyse's 1st Easter Cantata.

== Antisemitic writings ==
In 1813, Thaarup published Moses and Jesus or On the Intellectual and Moral Relations of the Jews and Christians, a translation of a German script (by Friedrich Buchholz); both in the scripture itself and in the recollection with which he accompanied the translation, many fanatical and untrue accusations are made against the Jews that their distinguishing feature is "Selfishness, Cruelty and Laziness, etc." The translated script provoked a strong response; Professor Otto Horrebow, confessional Christian Bastholm and several others supported Thaarup in his attack, while he was sharply countered by people like Jens Baggesen, Steen Steensen Blicher, Johan Werfel and others. On this subject, Thaarup published a few more writings: Vor Haandtering (1816), a free translation of a German play by Sessa, Over the Jews' Claims on German Civil Law (1816) and The Rights of Christianity and the German People (1817), both translations of German writings by Friedrich Rühs.
