= Sophus Juncker-Jensen =

Danish photographer

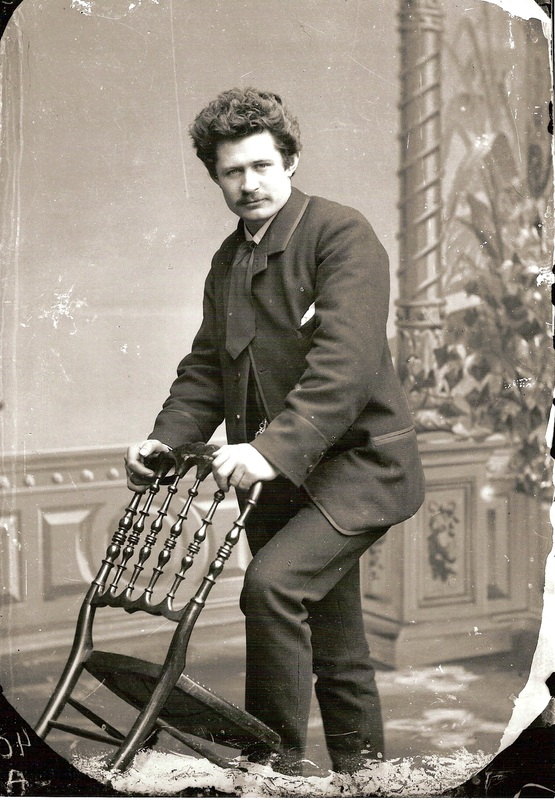
- Photographic self-portrait by Peter Elfelt
- Born: 16 February 1859; Vejle, Denmark
- Died: 15 October 1940 (aged 81); Copenhagen, Denmark
- Occupation: Photographer
- Years active: 1888–1940

Sophus Juncker-Jensen (16 February 1859 – 16 October 1940) was an early Danish photographer. He operated a photographic studio in Copenhagen from 1888 to 1940. It was from 1894 situated at Vimmelskaftet 39. He was a noted portrait photographer and is also remembered for his photographs from the Nordic Exhibition of 1888. The studio was after his death continued by his son Jens Juncker-Jensen until 1976.

== Early life ==
Juncker-Jensen was born on 16 February 1859 in Vejle. the son of photographer J. J. Jensen. He was apprenticed to J. E. Bøgh in Aarhus. He was in the early 1880s employed by Gottlieb Støckel in Rønne on Bornholm. He later worked for Budtz Müller & Co. in Copenhagen.

== Photographic studio ==
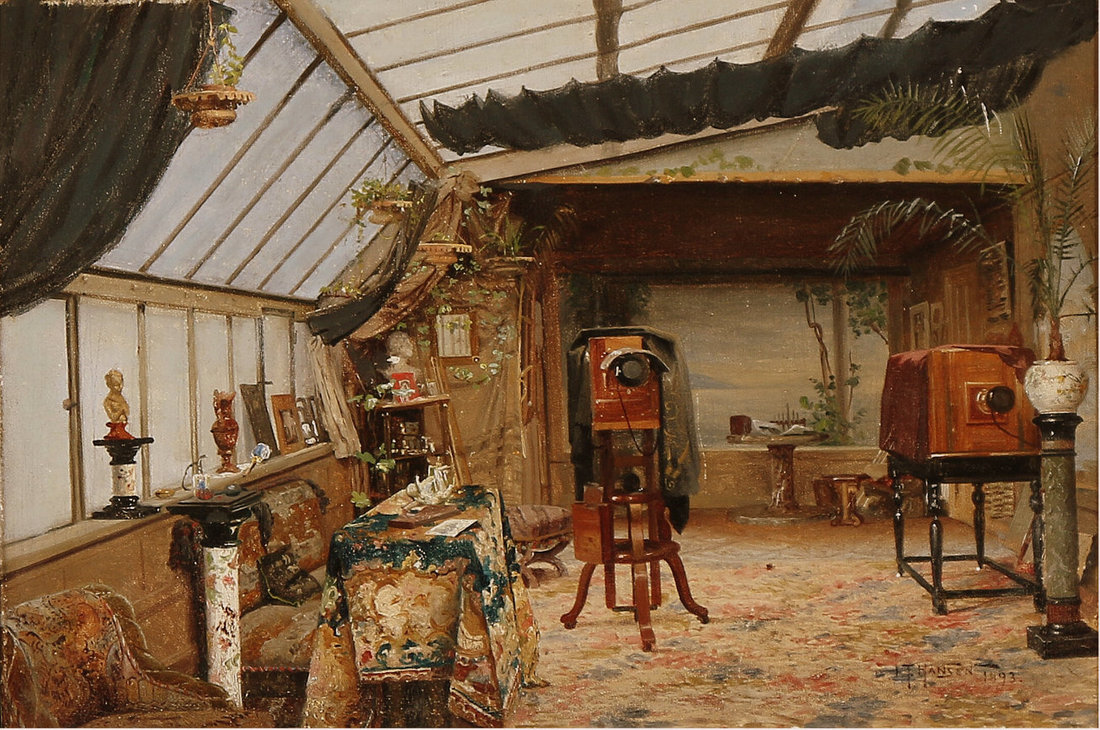
I. T. Hansen: Interior of Sophus Juncker-Jensen's photographic studio, 1893

Juncker-Jensen acquired the exclusive rights to operating a photographic studio at the Nordic Exhibition of 1888. It opened on 18 May 1888 and he made portrait photographs of many of the visitors and sold large prints of his exterior and interior photographs from the exhibition.

Hos photographic studio was after the exhibition moved to new premises at Frederiksberggade 21. In 1891 he went on a study trip to Russia and several countries in Western Europe.

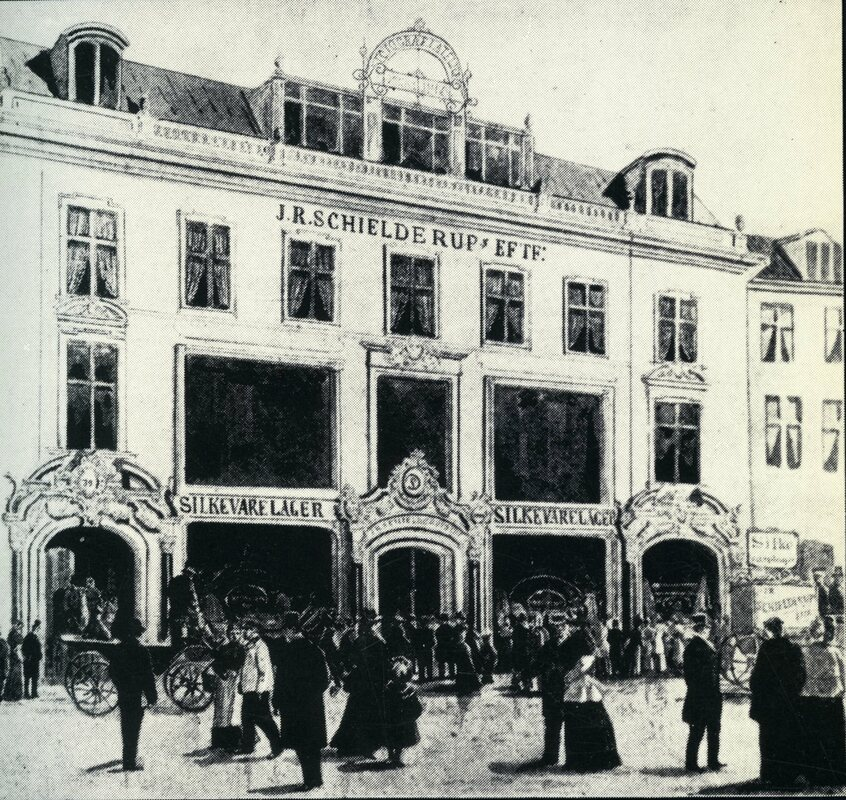
Vimmelskaftet 39

His photographic studio relocated to the adjacent building at Frederiksberggade 19 in 1893 and to Vimmelskaftet in 1895.

The firm was after Juncker-Jensen's death in 1940 continued by two of his sons. Jens Juncker-Jensen continued it until 1976.

== Written works ==
Juncker-Jensen has written Fotografisk erindringer about his life as photographer.

== Personal life ==
Juncker-Jensen married Rigmor Ida Wilhelmine Holzmann (17 March 1883 – 10 September 1978), a daughter of banker Johan Poul Christopher Holzmann (died 1923) and Dagmar Knudsen (1924).

Juncker-Jensen was appointed as a Knight in the Order of the Dannebrog in 1938.

== Legacy ==
The firm's negatives from 1921 to 1974 and protocols from 1922 to 1974 are kept in Royal Danish Library9.

== Gallery ==
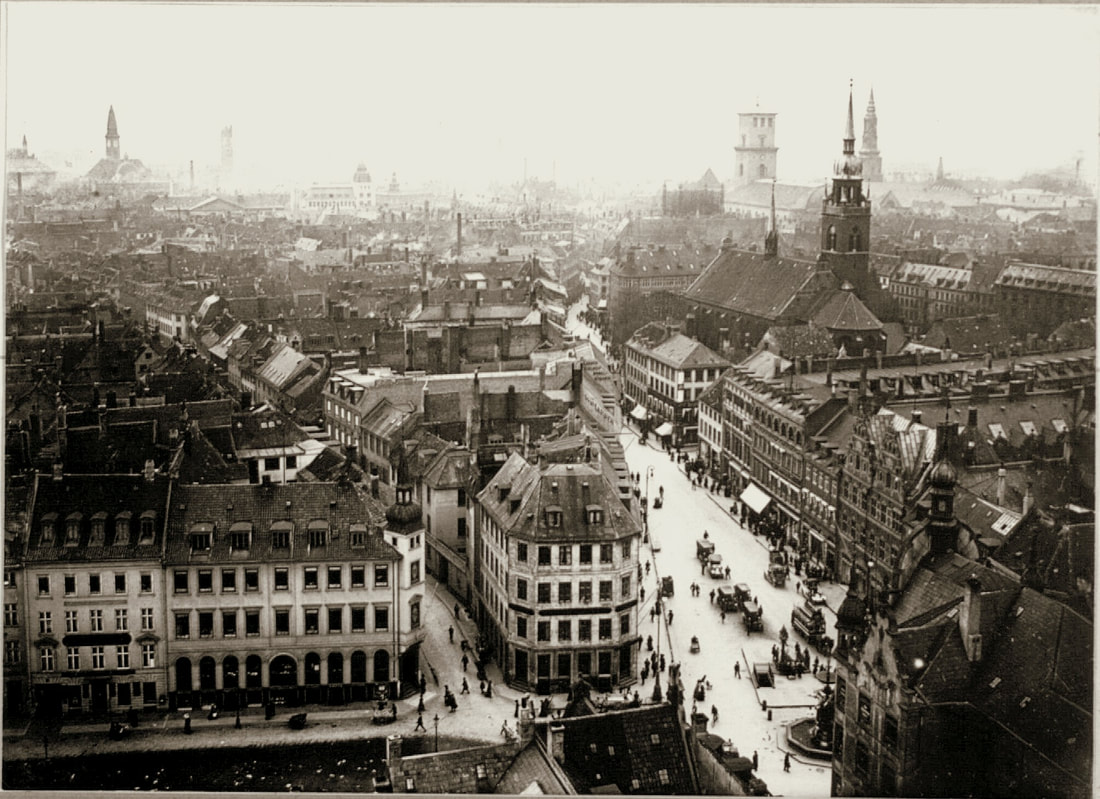
Amagertorv, 1895

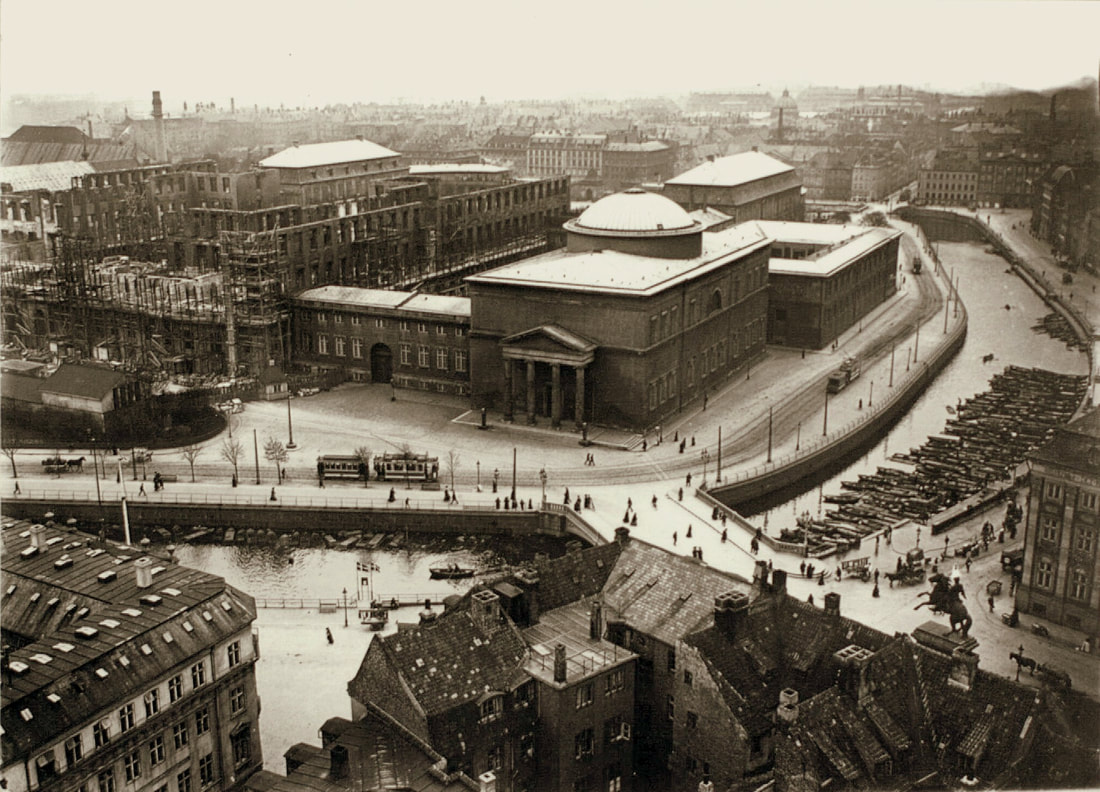
Slotsholmen, 1895
