= Dragon Fountain (Copenhagen) =

Fountain in Copenhagen, Denmark

Coordinates: 55.67570°N 12.56858°E

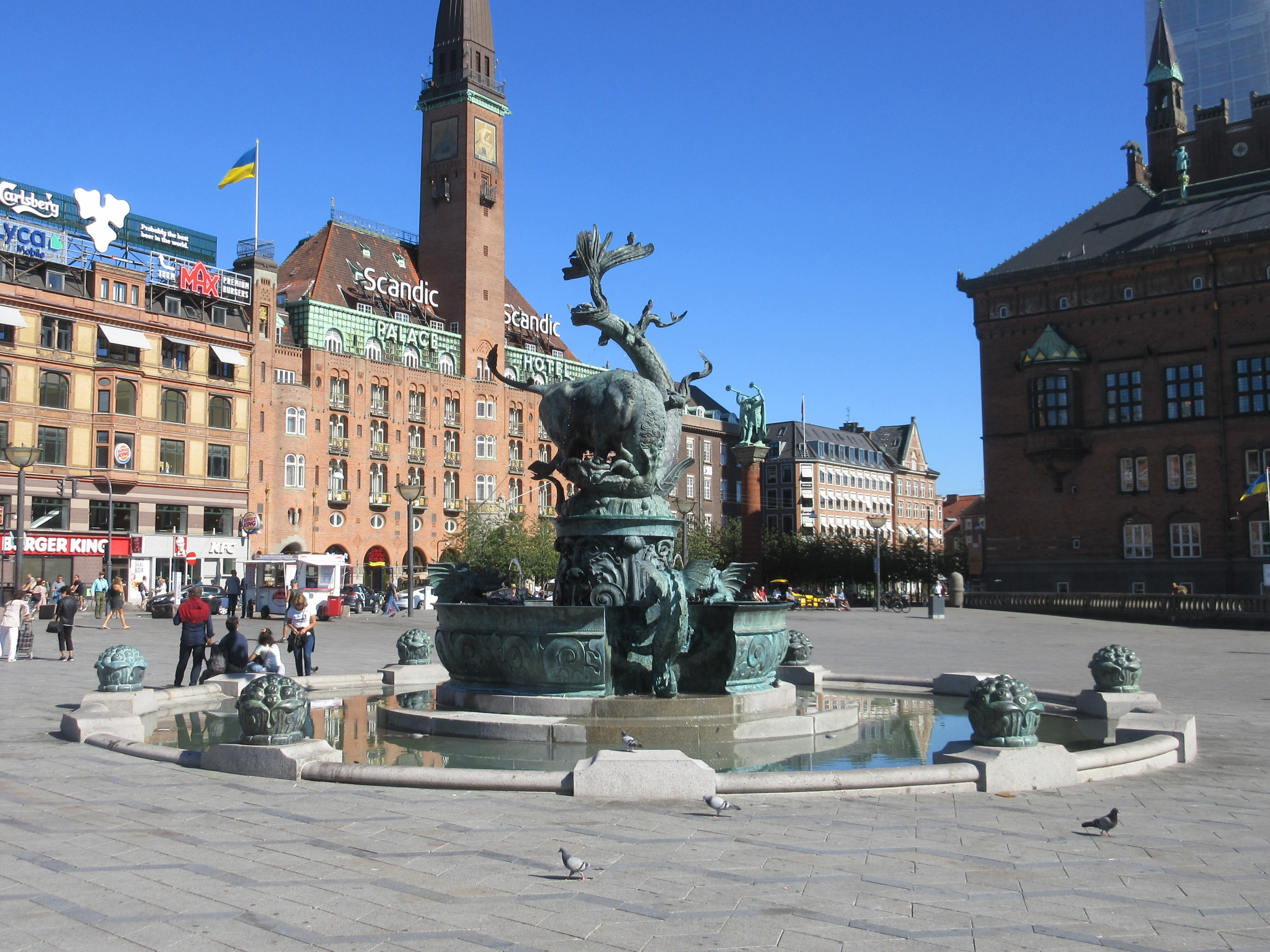
- Designer: Joakim Skovgaard, Thorvald Bindesbøll
- Completion date: 4 June 1923
- Medium: Cast bronze
- Subject: A bull in combat with a dragon
- Dimensions: 7 m (23 ft 0 in); 3.1 m diameter (10 ft 2 in)
- Location: City Hall Square, Copenhagen, Denmark

The Dragon Fountain is a fountain located in the City Hall Square in Copenhagen, Denmark. It was designed by Joakim Skovgaard in collaboration with Thorvald Bindesbøll and features a bull in combat with a dragon.

== Description ==
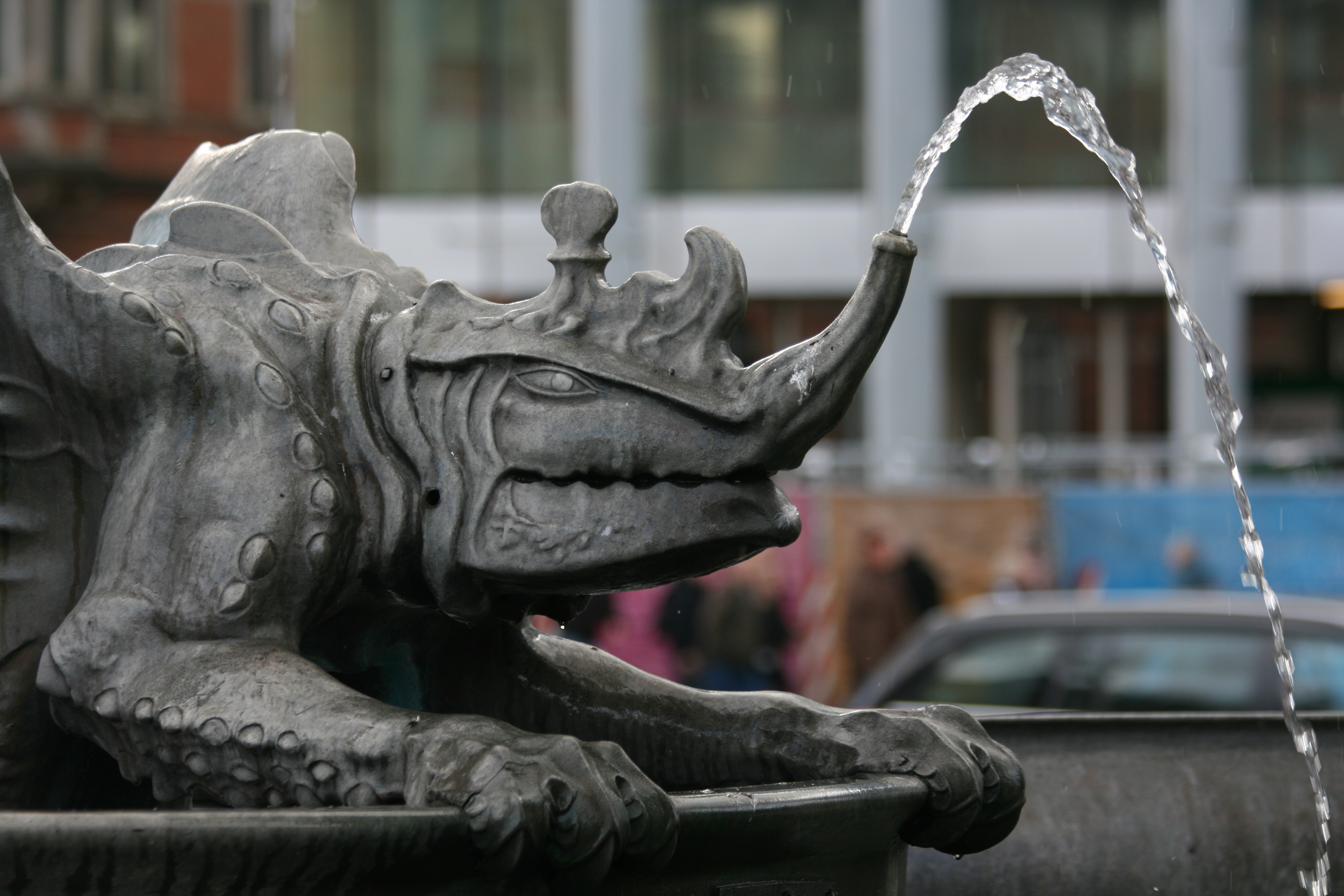
Detail from the basin edge

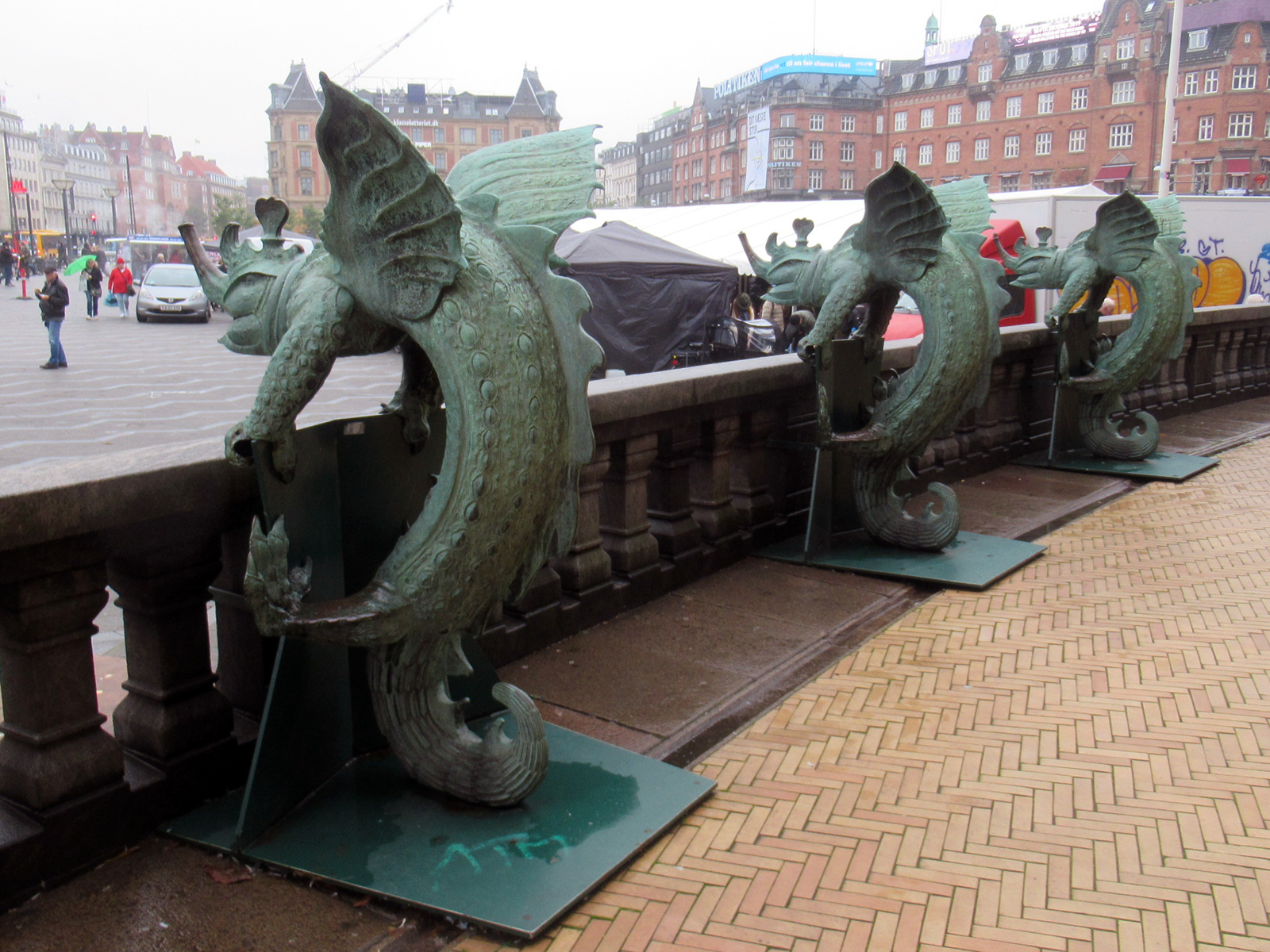
kites that were part of the fountain till 1923

The fountain stands just under 7 metres tall and the basin has a diameter of 3.1 metres. The central motif of the fountain is a bull fighting a dragon. On the edge of the basin sit three water-spraying dragons. Other decorations on the basin are inspired by Ancient Greek ornamentation.

== History ==
The design was originally created as an entry in the competition for a new monument on Amagertorv. Skovgaard conceived the original idea and made the first model in 1889. It was then modified by Bindesbøll before Skovgaard created the final drawings. The competition was not won by Skovgaard and Bindesbøll but by Edvard Petersen and Vilhelm Bissen with their Stork Fountain.

In connection with the Town Hall Exhibition in 1901, which was dedicated to Danish art from before 1890, it was decided to realize Skovgaard's and Bindesbøll's old design on the City Hall Square. The project was also supported by Forenignen til Hovedstadens Forskønnelse and the Eibeschütz Grant (Eibeschützlegatet) as well as a few other foundations. The site on the City Hall Square had originally been intended for the Gefion Fountain but this monument was instead moved to Nordre Toldbod.

The Dragon Fountain's first part, without the central animal group, was inaugurated in 1904. It was vigorously criticized by the press and became colloquially known as "The spittoon" (Danish: Spytbakken) among the residents of Copenhagen.

The fountain was surrounded by a low, outer basin in 1908. A plaster model of the central composition was on display in the fountain from 31 May until 7 June 1915. A bronze cast was later created in Lauritz Rasmussen's bronze workshop and the fountain was finally inaugurated on 4 June 1923.

In 1954, H. C. Andersens Boulevard, until then known as Vestre Boulevard, was expanded. The Dragon Fountain had to be moved 25 metres and the outer basin was removed. In 1974, it was placed on Brønshøj Torv but removed again in 2001. It has been proposed to move the fountain again to a new location on the square with the outer basin.

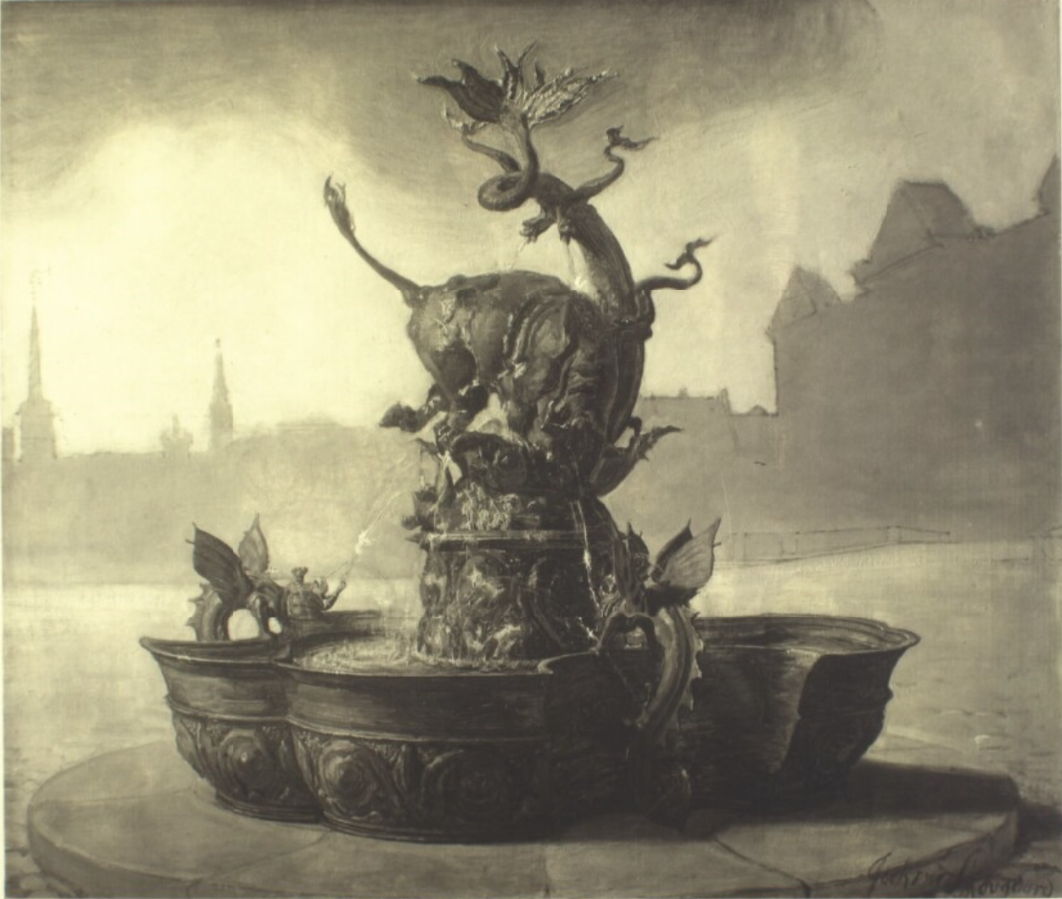
Rendering by Bindesbøll and Skovgaard

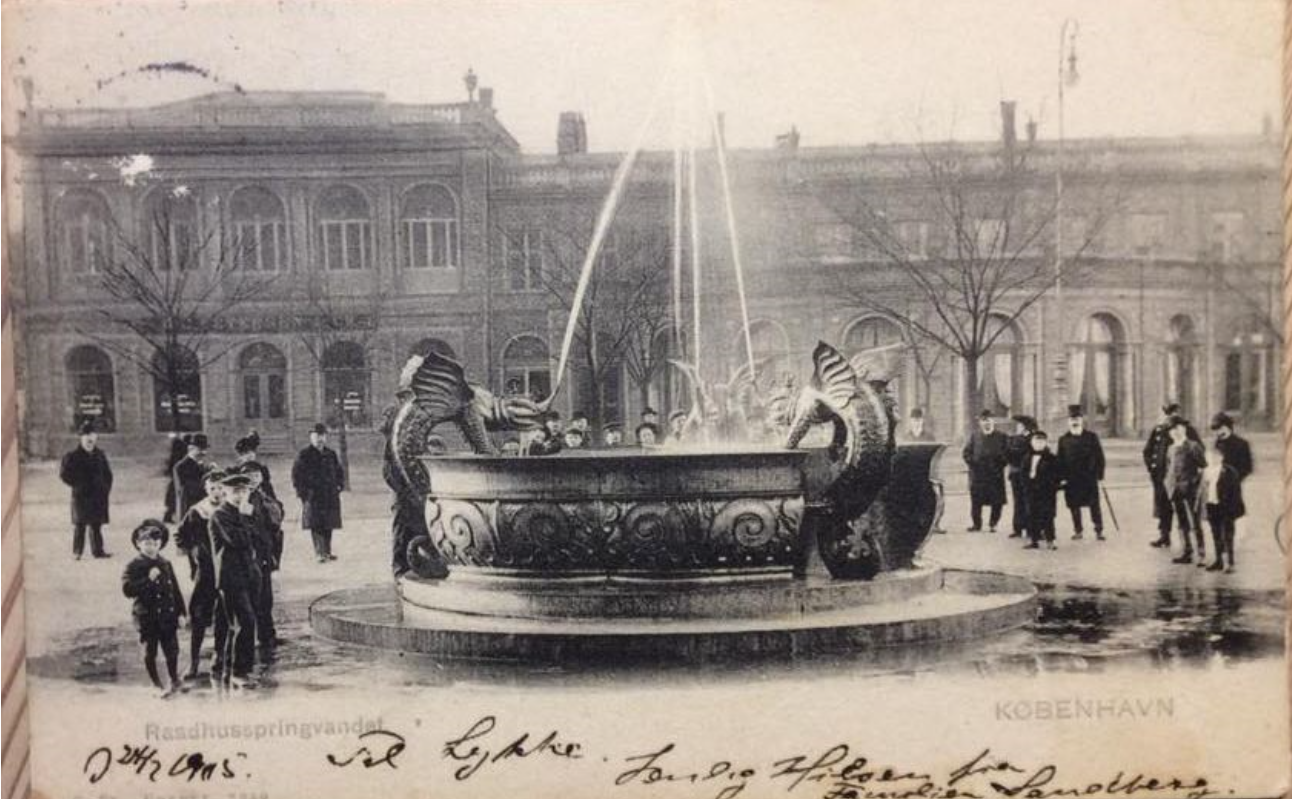
The City Hall Fountain in 1905

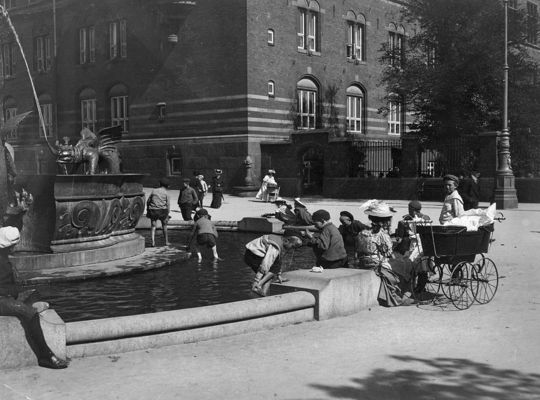
The low, outer basin which was installed in 1908 as seen in 1912

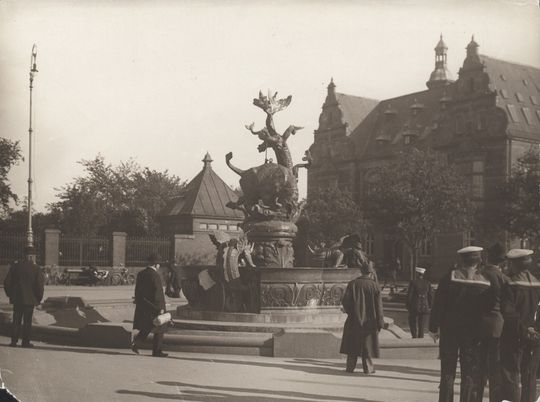
The plaster model on display in 1915

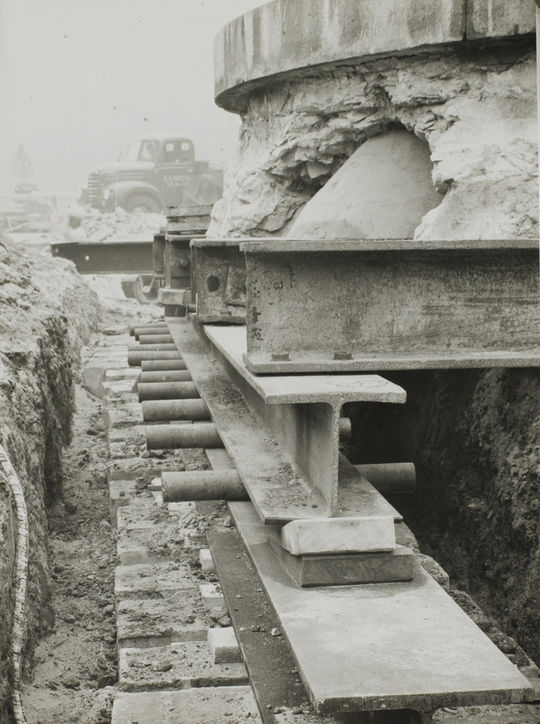
The Dragon Fountain being moved on 31 August 1954

== See also ==
- List of public art in Copenhagen
