= Dragon Fountain =

Dragon Fountain may refer to:

== Fountains ==
- Dragon Fountain, Copenhagen, a fountain in Copenhagen, Denmark
- Dragon Fountain, a fountain in Schleiz, Germany

== Other uses ==
- Longquan, a Chinese city whose name means "Dragon Fountain"
