= Edvard Petersen =

Danish painter

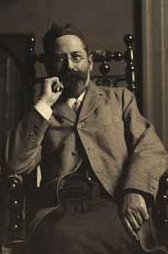
- Edvard Petersen
- Born: 4 February 1841; Copenhagen, Denmark
- Died: 5 December 1911 (aged 70); Copenhagen
- Education: Royal Danish Academy of Fine Arts
- Known for: Painting
- Movement: Realism

Edvard Petersen (4 February 1841 – 5 December 1911) was a Danish painter. He also designed the Stork Fountain on Amagertorv in Copenhagen.

== Biography ==
From 1851 he attended the Royal Danish Academy of Fine Arts. In the 1860s and 1870s he painted romantic landscape paintings under influence of Vilhelm Kyhn. He was a close friend of fellow painter Theodor Philipsen and together they went on several travels, including two stays in Italy between 1875 and 1880 and a visit to France. The friendship did not seem to influence Petersen's rather conservative style of painting and his works from the times abroad are generally traditional paintings of local life.

In the 1880s Petersen painted a number of figure paintings of street life in Copenhagen under influence of French Realism. His most famous paintings are Emigrants on Larsens Plads (1890) and A Return, the America Liner at Larsens Plads (1894).

With his Stork Fountain proposal, Petersen won the competition for the design of a new fountain on Amagertorv in Copenhagen in 1888. The sculptor Vilhelm Bissen moulded the birds and the fountain was inaugurated in 1904.

== Gallery ==
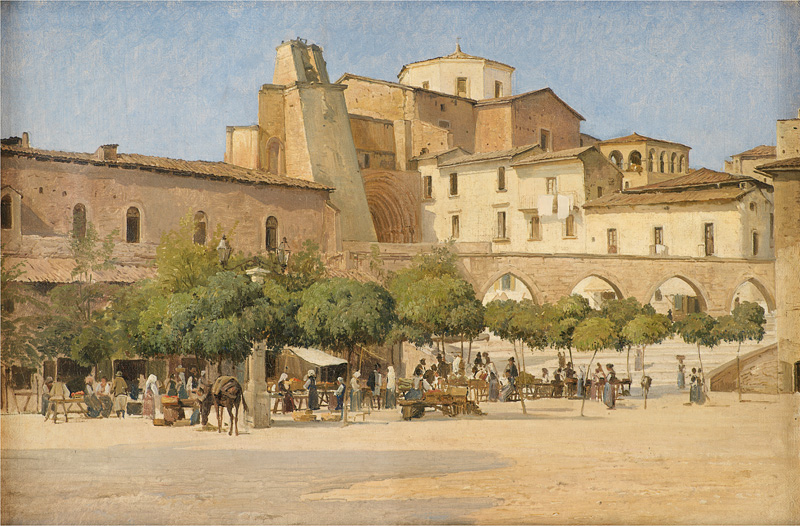
The square in Sulmona

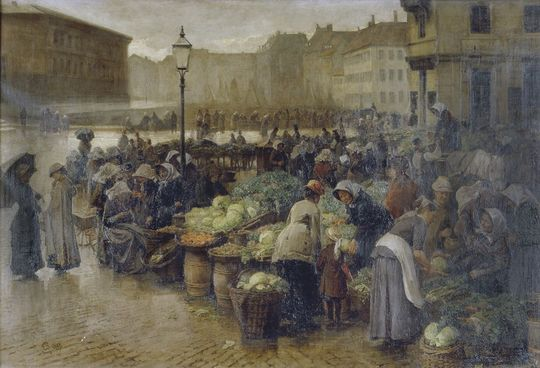
Farmers' wives at Højbro Plads (1883)

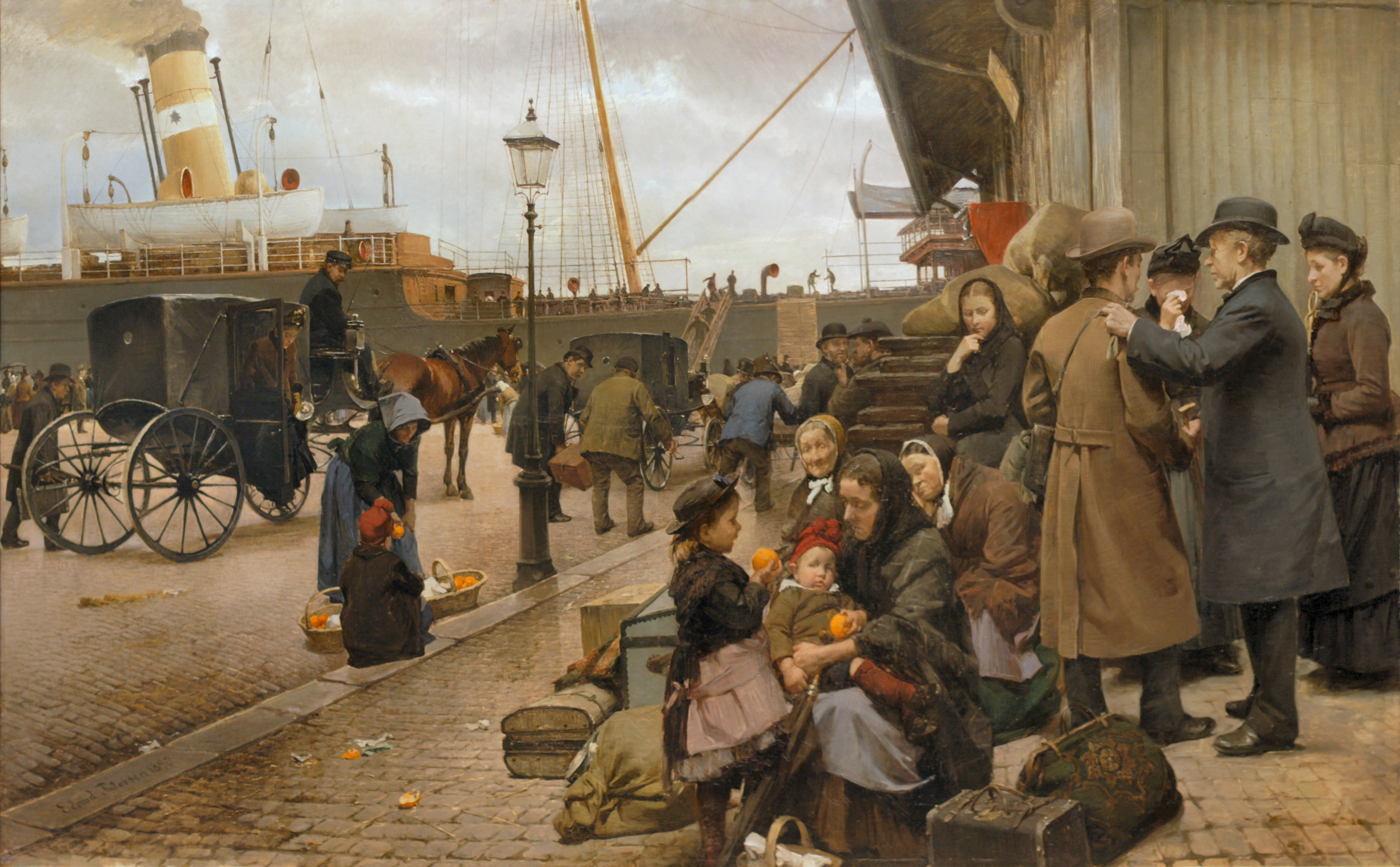
Emigrants at Larsens Plads (1890)

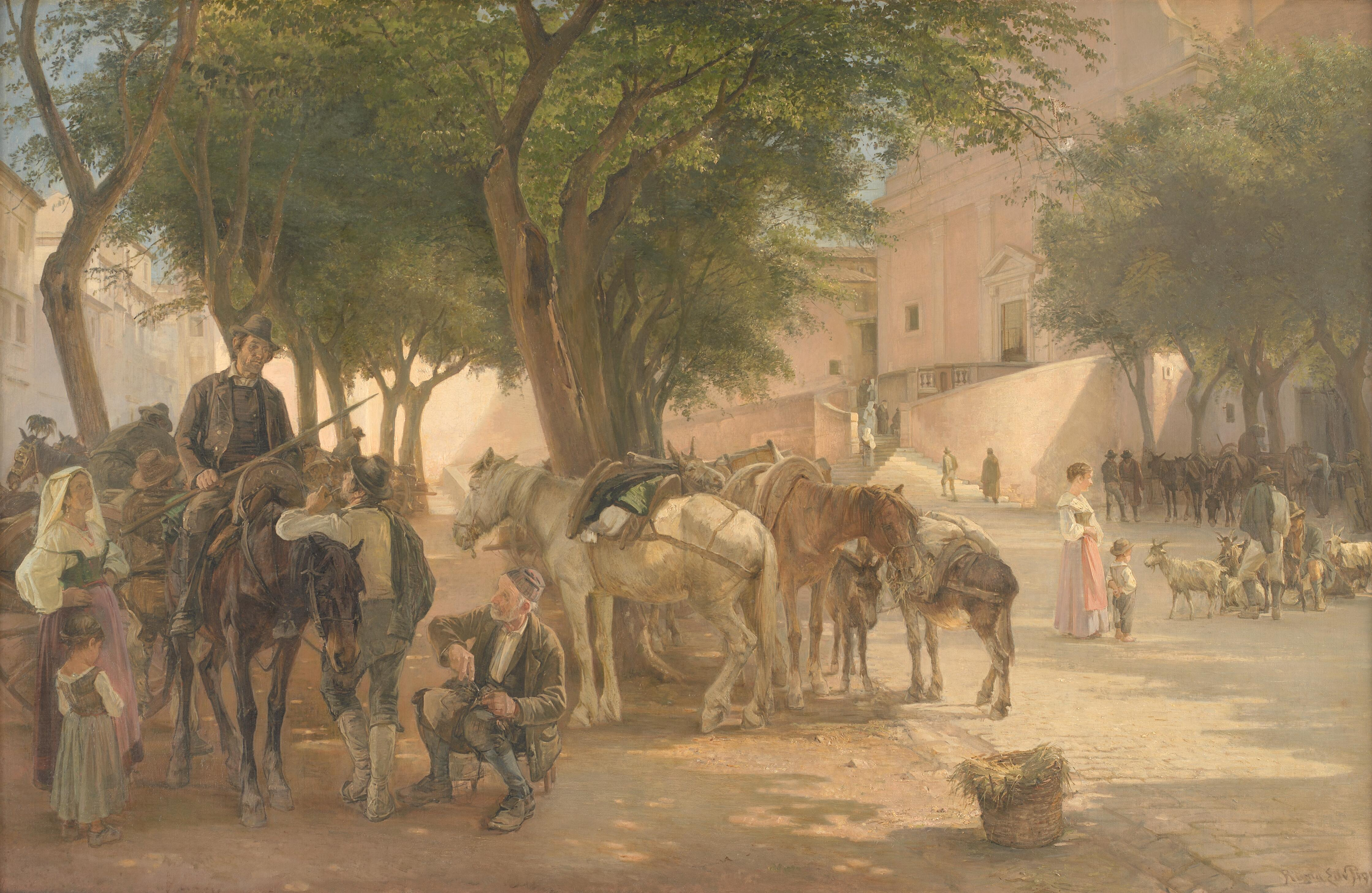
At the Capuchin Monastery in Rome (1911)

== See also ==
- List of Danish painters
- Art of Denmark
