= Wivell =

Wivell is a surname. Notable people with the surname include:

- Abraham Wivell (1786–1849), British portrait painter
- William J. Wivell (born 1964), American politician

== See also ==
- Carl Wivel (1844–1922), Danish restaurateur
