= Stork Fountain =

Historic landmark in Copenhagen, Denmark

Coordinates: 55.6788°N 12.5796°E

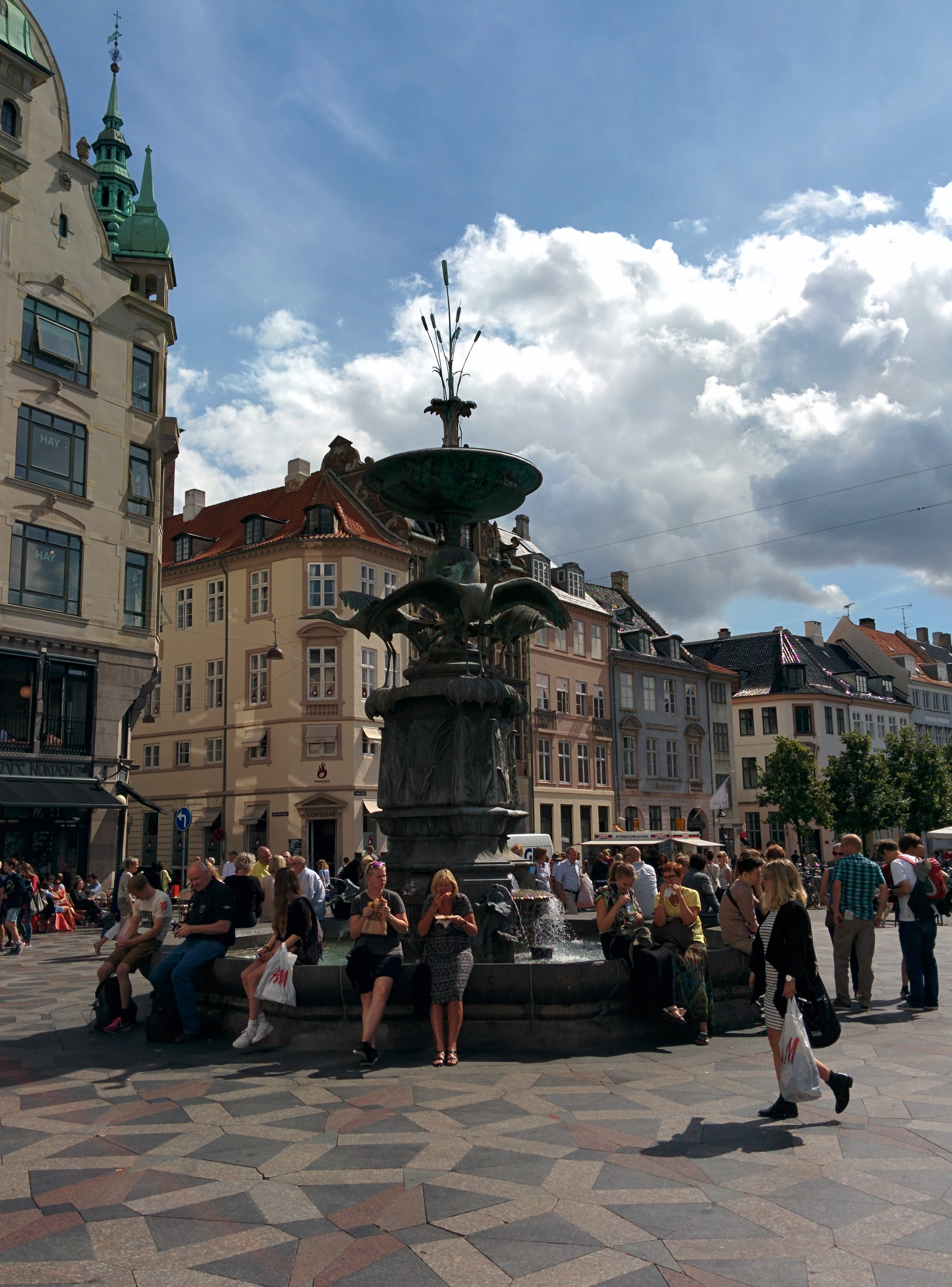
The Stork Fountain

The Stork Fountain is located on Amagertorv in central Copenhagen, Denmark. It was a present to Crown Prince Frederik (later Frederik VIII) and Crown Princess Louise in connection with their silver wedding anniversary in 1894. It depicts three storks about to set off.

Since 1950, it has been a tradition that newly graduated midwives dance around the fountain.

== History ==
In 1888, the Society for the Beautification of Copenhagen announced a competition for a fountain on the prominent square to celebrate the upcoming silver wedding anniversary of Crown Prince Frederik (VIII) and Crown Princess Louise on 28 July 1894.

The competition was won by Edvard Petersen and Vilhelm Bissen. Another entry in the competition was Thorvald Bindesbøll and Joakim Skovgaard's Dragon Fountain, which was later erected in the City Hall Square. Peder Vilhelm Jensen-Klint proposed a fountain depicting a merry Amager farmer sitting on a cabbagehead.

The fountain was inaugurated in 1894.

== Design ==
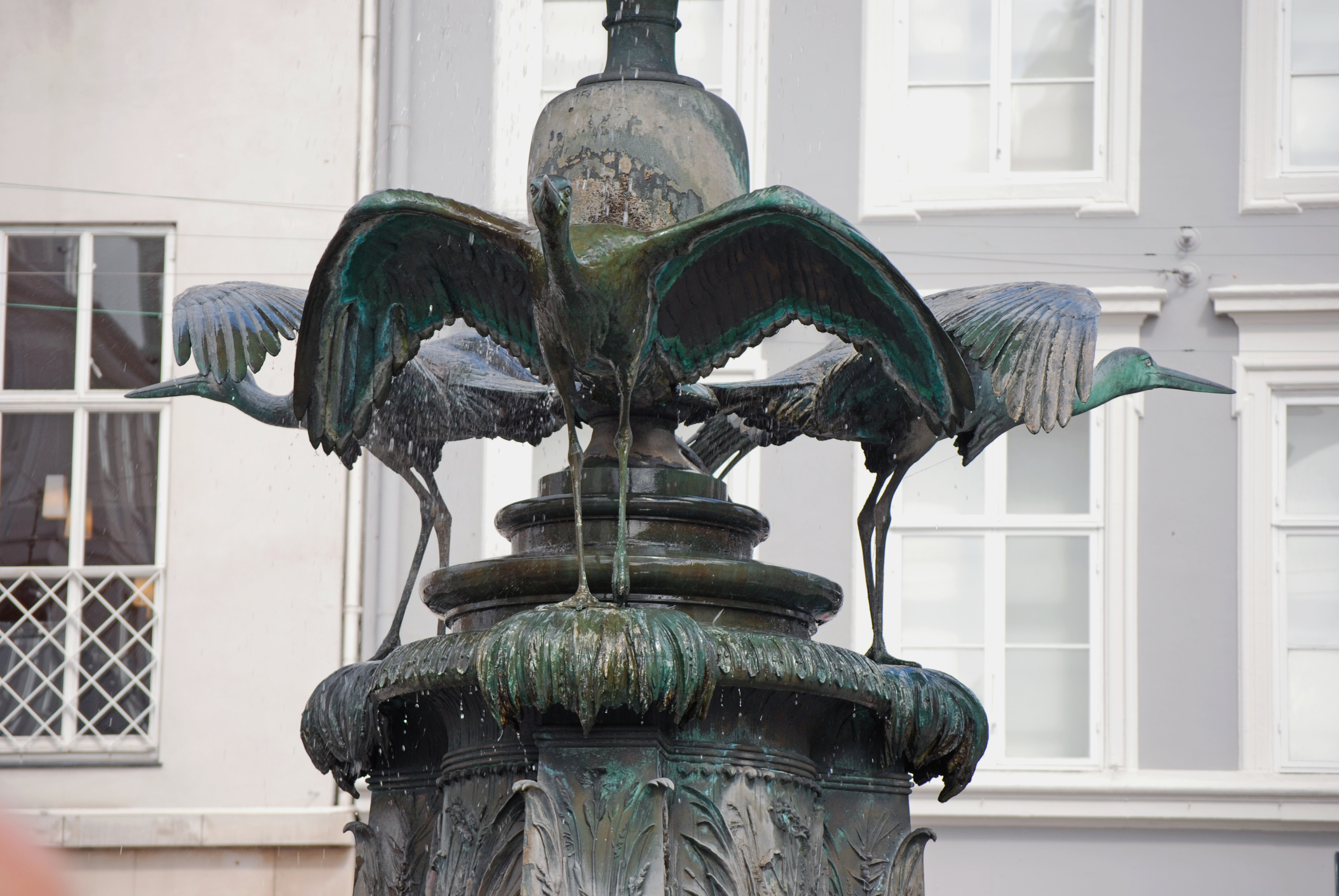
Detail

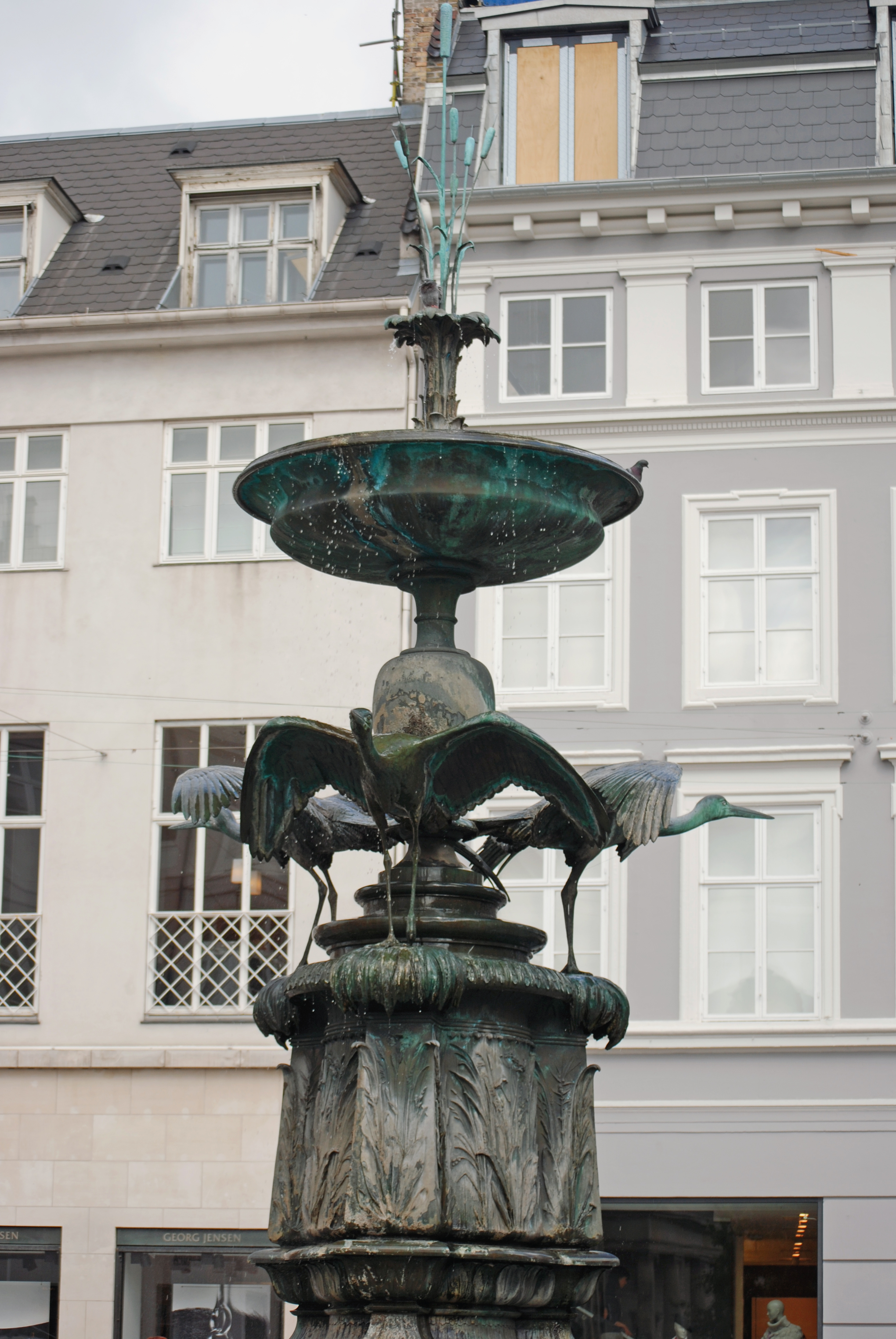
The fountain's pedestal

The fountain consists of a nine-sided basin of stone. It collects water from the bronze bowl at the top and the three small cascades around the edges of the central pedestal. The pedestal is decorated with reliefs of aquatic plants; in the basin, there are frogs sitting on dock leaves, spewing jets of water. On a shelf on the pedestal stand three storks ready to take flight in each of three different directions.

A common urban legend holds that the birds depicted are herons. In 2008, representatives from the Danish Ornithological Society stated that this is not true and that the birds are indeed storks.

== Colding-Jorgensen experiment ==
In early 2009, as part of a classroom experiment on viral communication, slacktivism, and social media, Anders Colding-Jørgensen, a lecturer from the University of Copenhagen, created a Facebook protest group against the demolition of the Stork Fountain. In a week it managed to attract 10,000 supporters and after two weeks it had 27,000 members. However, the cause was purely fictitious; there was no threat of demolition and the fountain is in fact a listed monument.

== Cultural references ==
During the late 1960s, the fountain became a popular meetingplace for members of the protest movements. Danish folk singer Cæsar received mainstream popularity with his protest song named Storkespringvandet (Stork Fountain) about police brutality. The song's lyrics, written by Thøger Olesen, were set to the popular Scottish nursery rhyme Ally Bally Bee (Coulter's Candy).
