= Wilhelm Bissen =

Wilhelm Bissen may refer to:

- Herman Wilhelm Bissen (1798–1868), Danish sculptor
- Christian Gottlieb Vilhelm Bissen, usually known simply as Vilhelm Bissen (1836–1913), his son, also a Danish sculptor
