= City Hall Square, Copenhagen =

Central square in Copenhagen, Denmark

Coordinates: 55°40′33″N 12°34′9″E

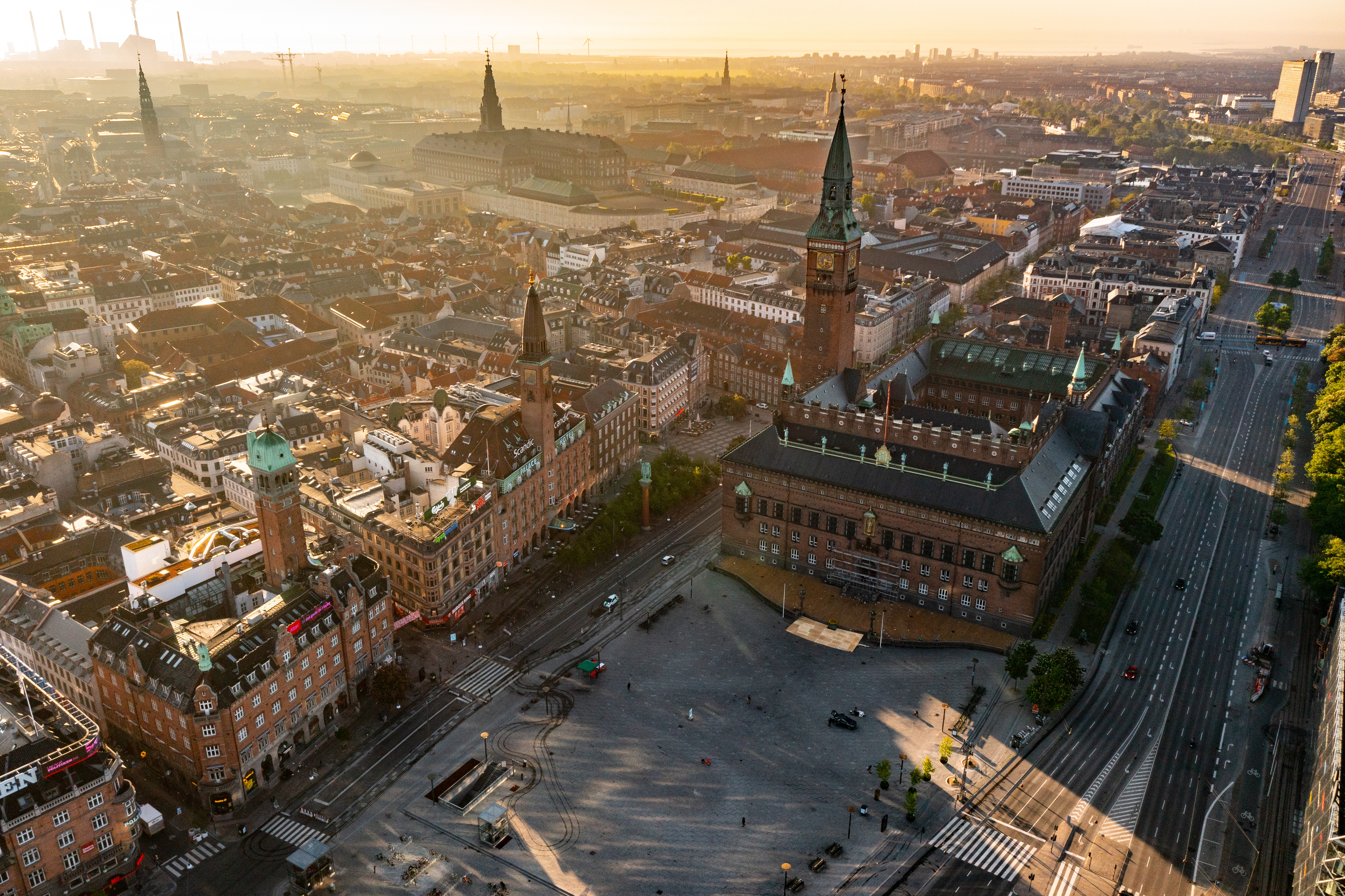
Aerial view of City Hall Square

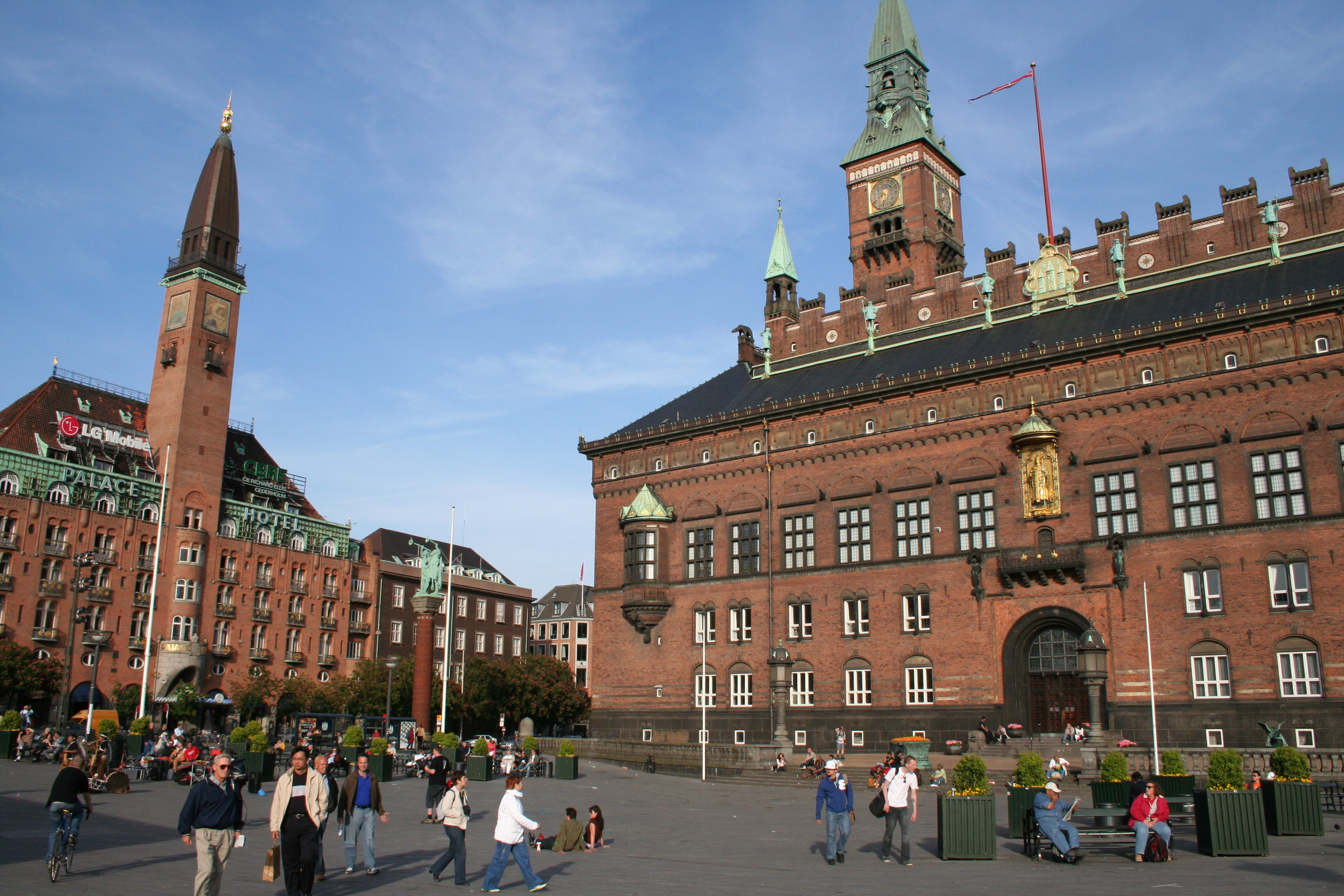
Rådhuspladsen with Palace Hotel and the City hall

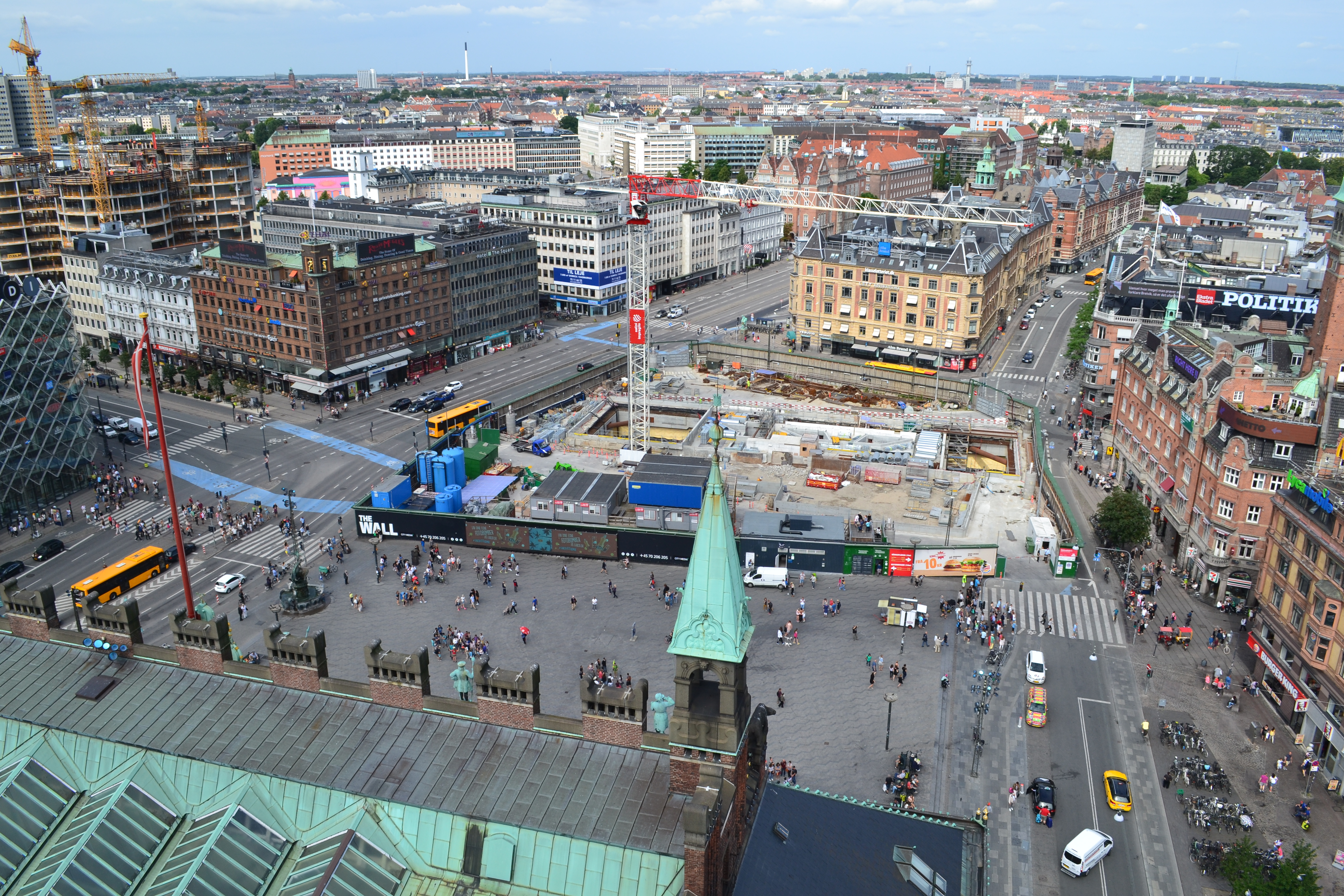
Rådhuspladsen by day, seen from the town hall tower

City Hall Square (Danish: Rådhuspladsen, pronounced [ˈʁʌðhusˌpʰlæsn̩]) is a public square in the centre of Copenhagen, Denmark, located in front of the Copenhagen City Hall. Its large size, central location, and affiliation with the city hall makes it a popular venue for a variety of events, celebrations and demonstrations. It is often used as a central point for measuring distances from Copenhagen.

City Hall Square is located at the southwestern end of the pedestrian street Strøget which connects it to Kongens Nytorv, the other large square of the city centre, passing Gammeltorv/Nytorv and Amagertorv along the way. Opposite Strøget, Vesterbrogade extends into the Vesterbro district and later crosses the border to Frederiksberg. H. C. Andersens Boulevard, Copenhagen's most heavily congested street, and Vester Voldgade pass the square on either side of the city hall.

Apart from the City Hall, notable buildings around the square include Politikens Hus, the headquarters of national daily newspaper Politiken, and Industriens Hus, the headquarters of the DI.

== History ==
=== Hay market and exhibition area ===
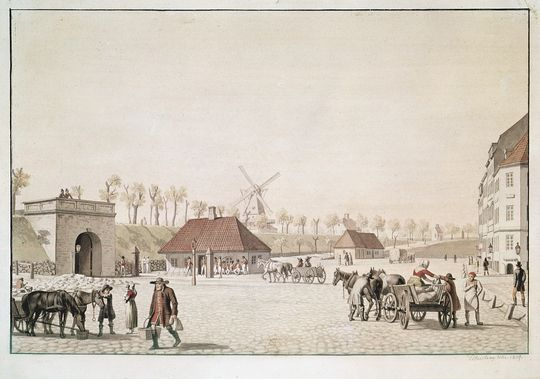
The hay market in 1809. Painting by C. W. Eckersberg

City Hall Square is located at the site of Copenhagen's old hay market and the Western City Gate of the Fortifications of Copenhagen.

When the fortifications were disbanded in the 1850s, it was decided to use the vacant land for an exhibition area which played host to first the Nordic Exhibition of 1872 and later the Nordic Exhibition of 1888.

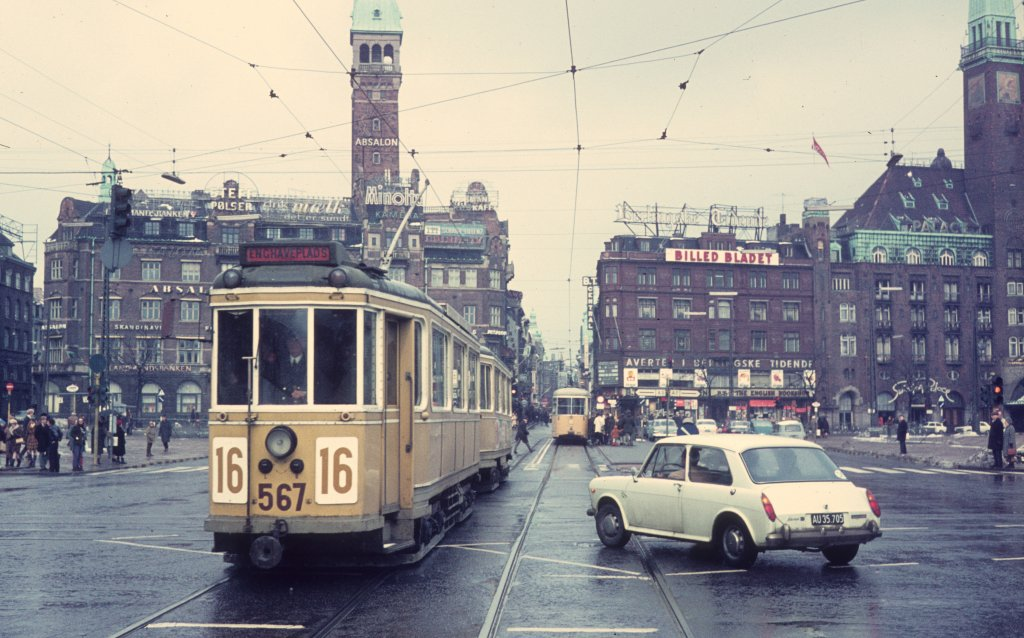
View east along tram tracks toward Strøget in 1970.

Vilhelm Klein designed an exhibition building for the first exhibition which was built at the corner of Vesterbro Passage which was built from 1870 to 1872. The four-winged, two-storey building was built in red brick to a design which was inspired by Italian Renaissance architecture. In 1879 the centre of the complex was re-built into a large domed exhibition hall.

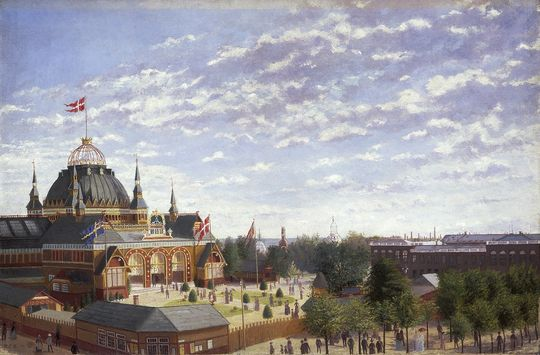
Nyrop's domed exhibition building from 1889

On 1 January 1888 the hay market moved to a new location outside Kødbyen, the new cattle and meat market which had opened in 1878. The site is still named Halmtorvet after it. The main venue of the Nordic Exhibition of 1888 was a large timber structure topped by a huge dome with a flag pole at its top. Its architect was the young and unknown Martin Nyrop who was later also to design the new city hall.

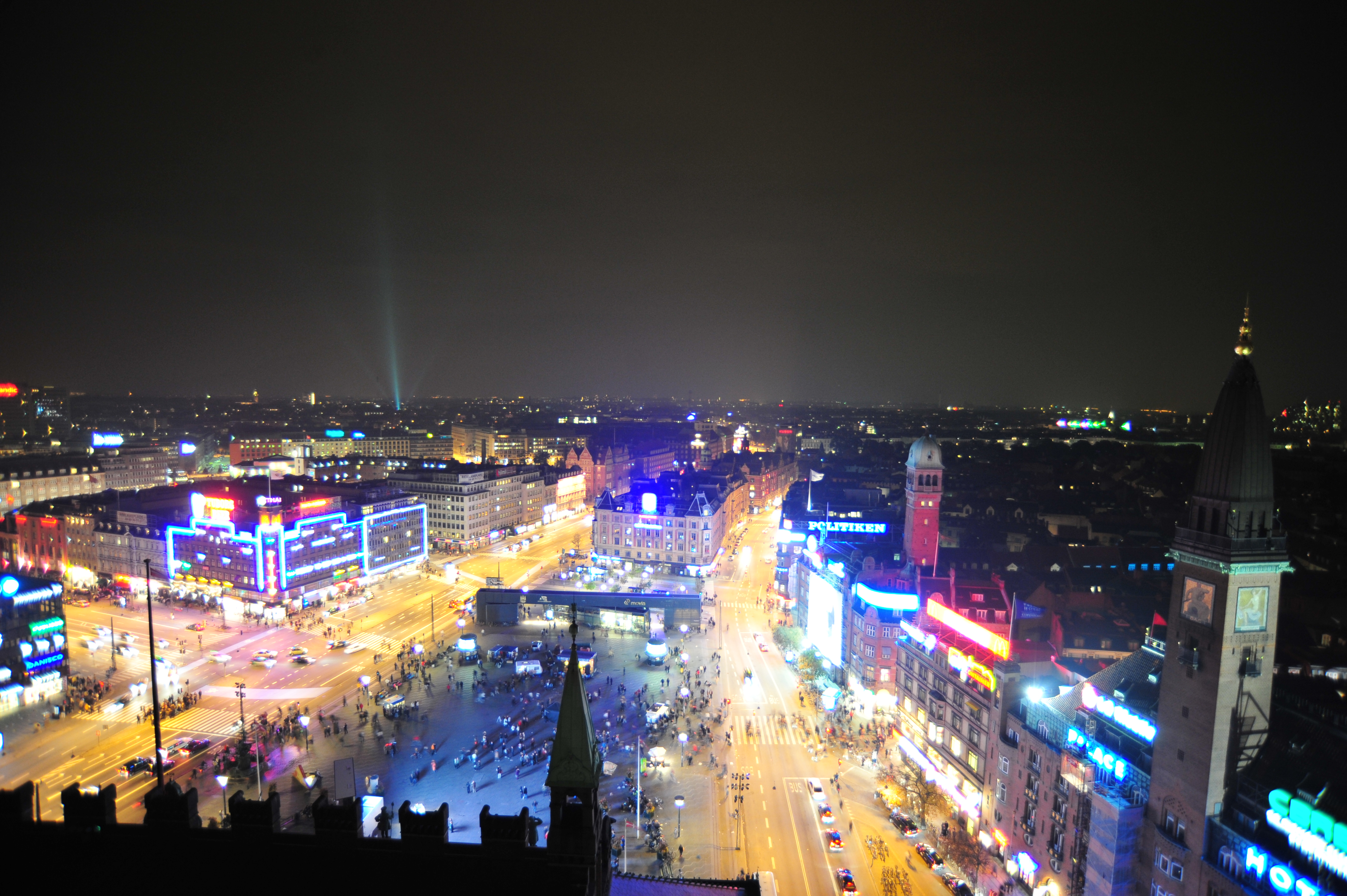
Aerial view of the square at night, 2008

=== The new city hall and its square ===
In the 1880s, plans were conceived to build a new city hall on the grounds, and in 1888, the expo area was cleared. An architecture competition was held in early 1889. Apart from Nyrop, who won the competition, Vilhelm Dahlerup and Valdemar Koch were among the participating architects. The design of the city hall was greatly inspired by the Palazzo Pubblico in Siena, Italy, and the design of the square was accordingly modeled on the shell-shaped Piazza del Campo outside that building.

On 28 July 1894, the foundation stone was laid. When it was inaugurated in 1905, the square in front of it became one of the most central and important spaces of the city.

The square was redesigned in 1995 and 1996 by KHR Architects, on the occasion of Copenhagen being the European Capital of Culture. The intersecting street leading from Vesterbrogade to Strøget was removed, uniting the two sides of the square. A bus hub was built on the northern side of the square.

In 2010, work began on a metro station on the site, requiring a major reorganisation of the site, with work was opened on 29 September 2019.

== Sculptures ==
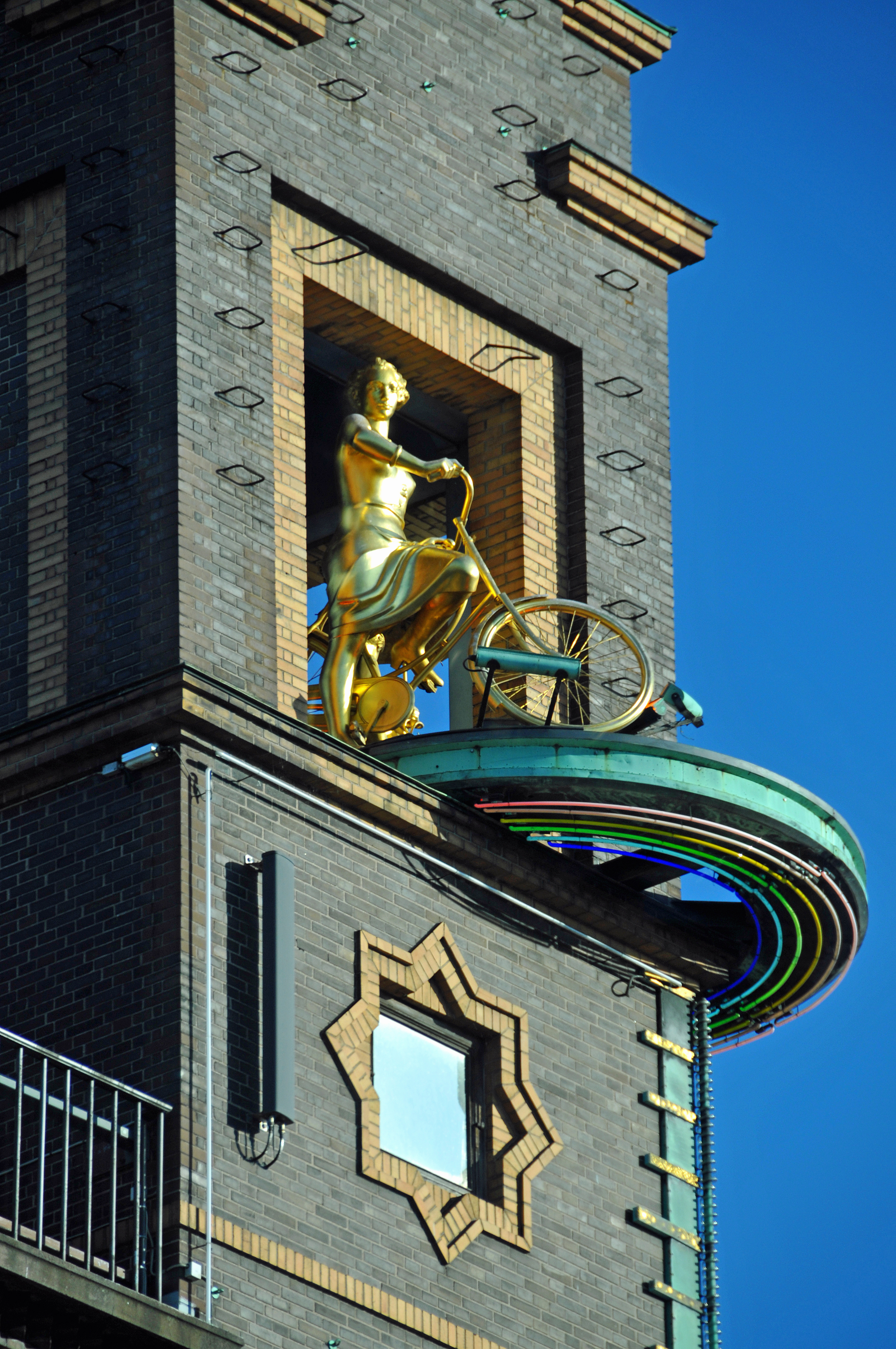
The Weather Girl with her bicycle

- The Dragon Fountain (Danish: Dragespringvandet), depicting a bull and a dragon in combat. Designed by Thorvald Bindesbøll and Joakim Skovgaard, out was inaugurated in 1904.
- The Weather Girl (Danish: vejrpigen) is perched high on the Richs Building on the corner of Rådhuspladsen and Vesterbrogade. It consists of a pair of gilded sculptures on a large rotary frame that are used to signal the expected weather. When clear weather is expected, a statue depicting a girl on a bicycle rotates to the front. When rain is expected, a second sculpture rotates to the front which depicts the girl with an umbrella walking her dog. The sculpture group is from 1936 and designed by Einar Utzon-Frank.
- The Lur Blowers is a bronze depicting two lur blowers standing atop a column on tiles. Standing 20 m tall, it was created in 1911 to 1913 by Siegfried Wagner.
- A statue of Hans Christian Andersen is in the square.

== Description ==
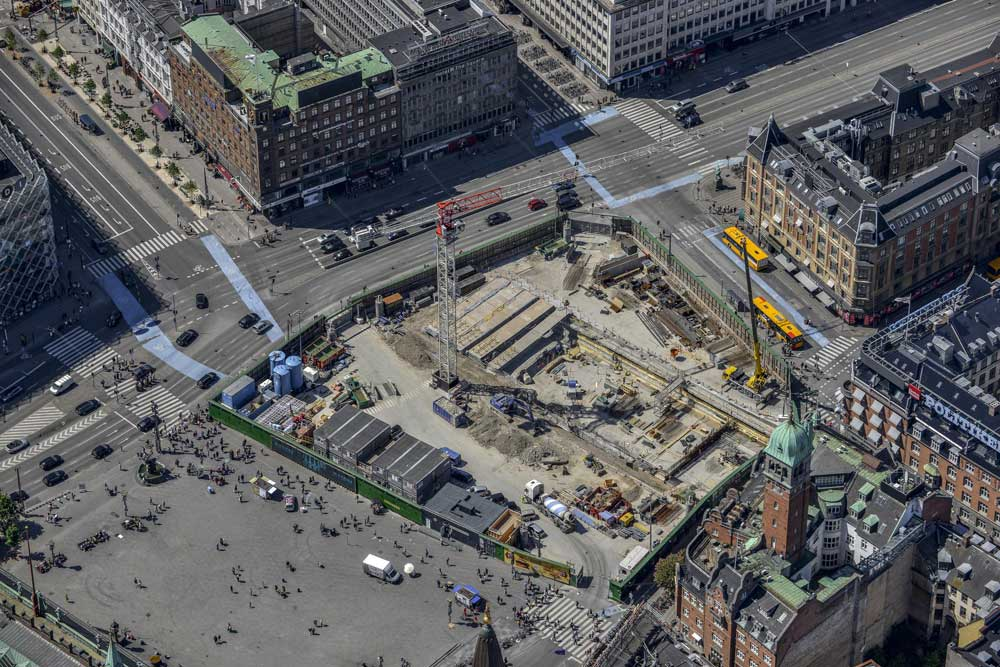
Aerial view of the square in May 2014 with construction of new metro station under way.

The square's central area is 9800 m². It is often a venue for demonstrations and buskers, and several bars and nightclubs are located in the vicinity. Rådhuspladsen also houses one of the city's bus centrals.

== In popular culture ==
- In the Danish board game Matador (an early derivative of the game Monopoly), Rådhuspladsen is the most expensive location (see also Localized versions of the Monopoly game).

== See also ==
- Vester Voldgade
- Hotel Bristol (Copenhagen)
- 2000 UEFA Cup Final riots
