= Carl Wivel =

Danish restaurateur

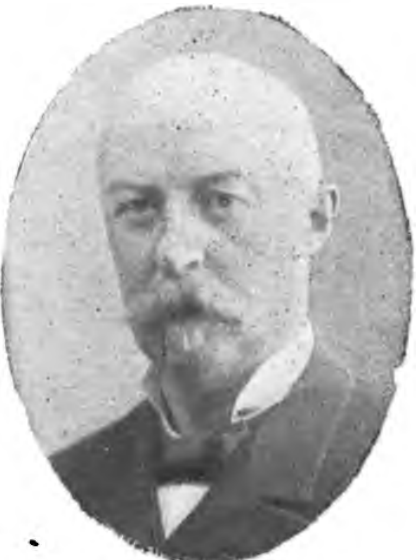
Carl Wivel

Carl Christian Wivel (12 October 1844 – 10 March 1922) was a Danish restaurateur who was best known for establishing the entertainment venue Restaurant Wivel (later continued as Wiwex) in Tivoli Gardens.

== Early life and education ==
Wivel was born on 12 October 1844 in Copenhagen, the son of joiner Jens Christian Wivel (1802–60) and Lovise Emilie Alvsen (1811–58). He served as a volunteer in the First Schleswig War. He was later trained as a barber and established his own barber shop on Holmens Kanal in 1872.

== Career ==
In 1880, Wivel took over the restaurant Røde Lygte on Gothersgade. In 1883, he aæsp leased the newly built Tårnpavillon (Tower Pavilion) in Tiboli Gardens. He kept Røde Lygte until 1888. In 1884, he successfully hosted a banquet for the International Medical Convention in Tivoli Gardens. The guests included Louis Pasteur. The Nordic Exhibition of 1888 contributed to further expanding his business.

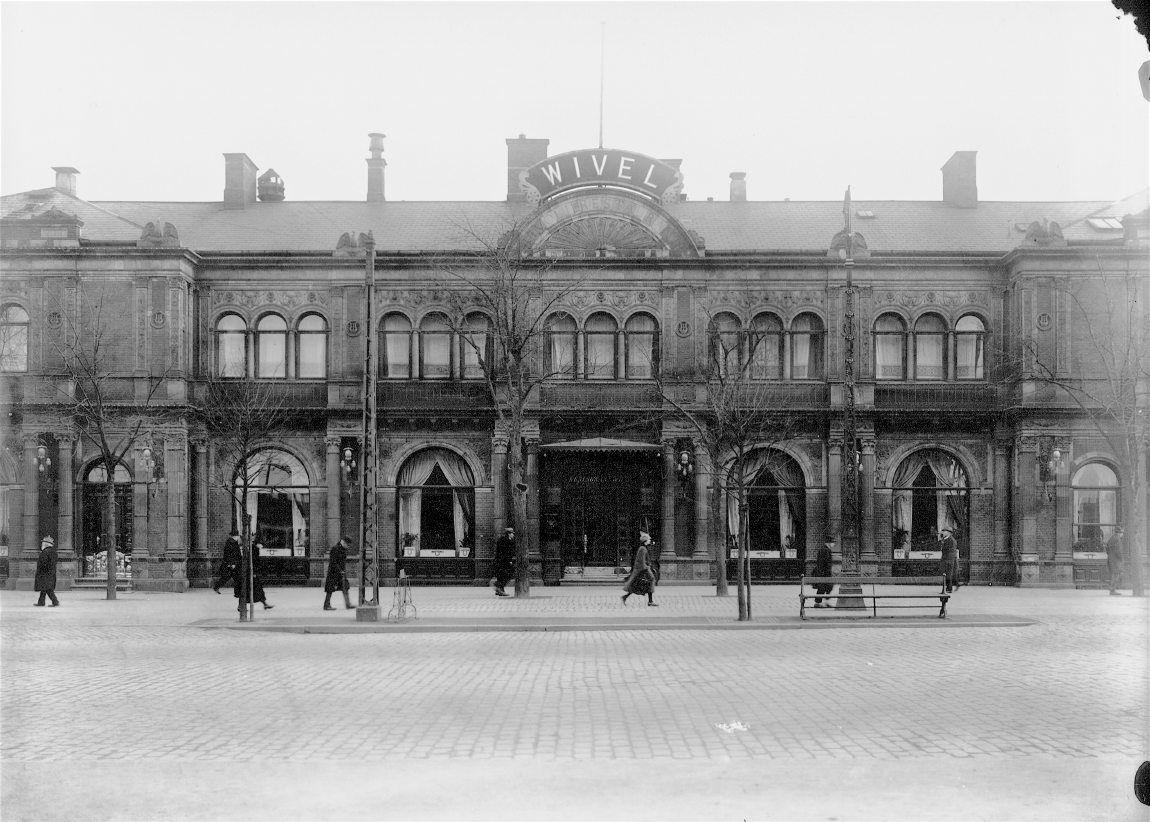
Restaurant Wivel photographed by Peter Elfelt.

In 1890, he opened Restaurant Wivel next to Tivoli Gardens' main entrance on Vesterbrogade. It was later expanded with more rooms until it continued all the way to the corner and down Bernstorffsgade. In 1910, Wivel took his nephew Anton Ludvig Pedersen (1868–1929) as a partner. In 1916, he retired from the company.

Wivel was also involved in construction projects. He constructed and owned Højbrohus at the corner of Østergade and Amagertorv in Copenhagen. He was chairman of the Copenhagen chapter of the Association of Restaurateurs and Hoteliers. and vice chairman of the Copenhagen chapter of the De Danske Vaabenbrødre society.

== Personal life ==
On 8 November 1878, Wivel married to Ulrikke Sarine (Serine) Cathrine Meyer (1854–1927). She was a daughter of café-owner Johan Martin Theodor Meyer (ca. 1825–77) and Mette Cathrine Petersen (ca. 1824–64). The couple were the parents of the daughter Anny Emilie Wivel (1879–1945). She was married to Jean Francois Davin Rosenstand (1867–1942).

In 1905, Wivel was awarded the title of kammerråd. In 1909, he was created a Knight of the Order of the Dannebrog. In 1919, he was awarded the Cross of Honour.

He died on 10 March 1922 in Monte Carlo. He is buried in a mausoleum at Frederiksberg Old Cemetery.
