= Højbrohus =

Building in Copenhagen, Denmark

Coordinates: 55°40′44″N 12°34′48″E

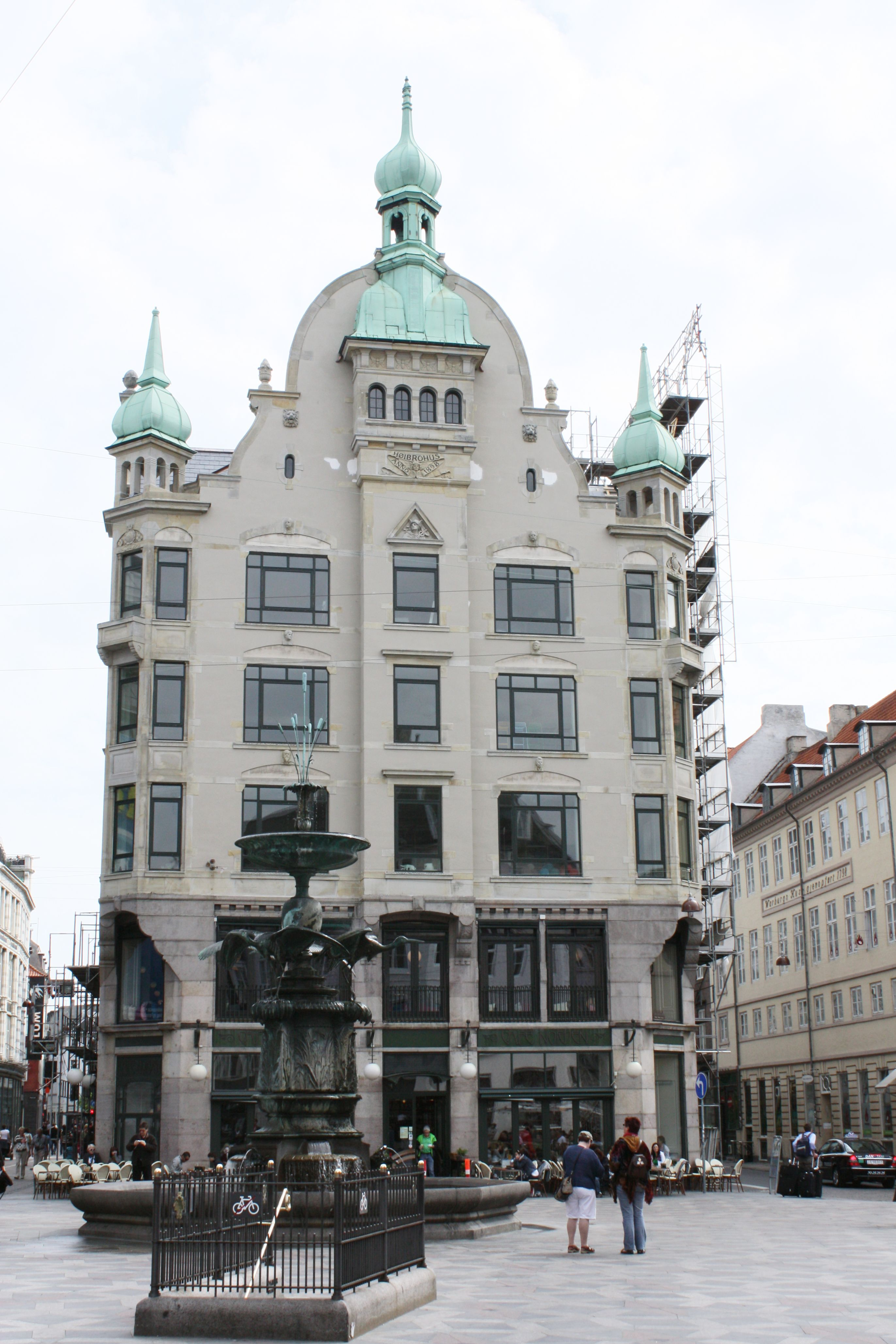
- The gable of Højbrohus with the Storkespringvandet fountain in the foreground, 2009

General information
- Architectural style: Art Nouveau
- Location: Amagertorv
- Town or city: Copenhagen
- Country: Denmark
- Completed: 1896

Design and construction
- Architect(s): Richard Bergmann

Højbrohus is an Art Nouveau-style building situated on the east side of Amagertorv, between Østergade and Store Kirkestræde, in the Old Town of Copenhagen, Denmark. It houses Café Norden on the two lower floors, and HAY House, a HAY flagship store, on the second floor.

== History ==
Store Lækkerbidsken, a hotel, was built at the site in 1656. It developed into the leading place of accommodation in the city. The large property was listed in Copenhagen's first cadastre of 1689 as No. 31 in the city's East Quarter. It was owned by etatsråd Elias von Hübsch (1793–) at that time. The property was listed as No. 36 in the new cadastre of 1756 and belonged to vice mayor Grøn's widow at that time.

The building was destroyed in the Copenhagen Fire of 1795. A new building with seven shops in the ground floor was completed at the site shortly thereafter. This property was listed in the new cadastre of 1806 as No. 37 in the city's East Quarter. It belonged to commandant at Rosenborg Castle Cæsar August Wilster (1734–1812) at that time. The building would later become known as Peter Egholm's House (Isenkræmmer Peter Egholms Gaard) after one of its owners.

The building constructed after the 1795 fire was then demolished in the mid-1890s. The new building was constructed for the restaurateur Carl Wivel in 1896. It was designed by the architect Richard Bergmann (1860–1925).

== Architecture ==
Højbrohus is built to an Art Nouveau-inspired design with many decorative details. A facade towards Amagertorv has a Dutch gable. The projecting central bay finishes in an onion domed spire, creating a tower-link silhouette against the rest of the building. The central "tower" is flanked by smaller, onion-domed turrets at the corners. The facade towards Amagertorv is also decorated with several reliefs and other ornamental details.

The facades towards Østergade features a smaller Dutch gable as well as many other decorative details.

== Gallery ==
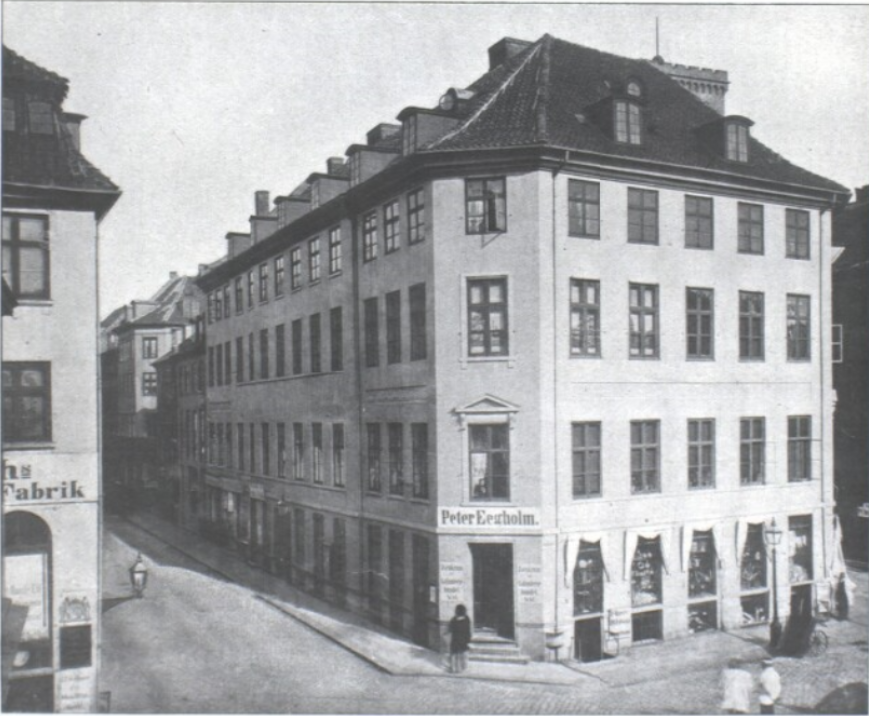
The building that was constructed after the Fire of 1795 and that was demolished in the 1890s to make way for the Højbrohus

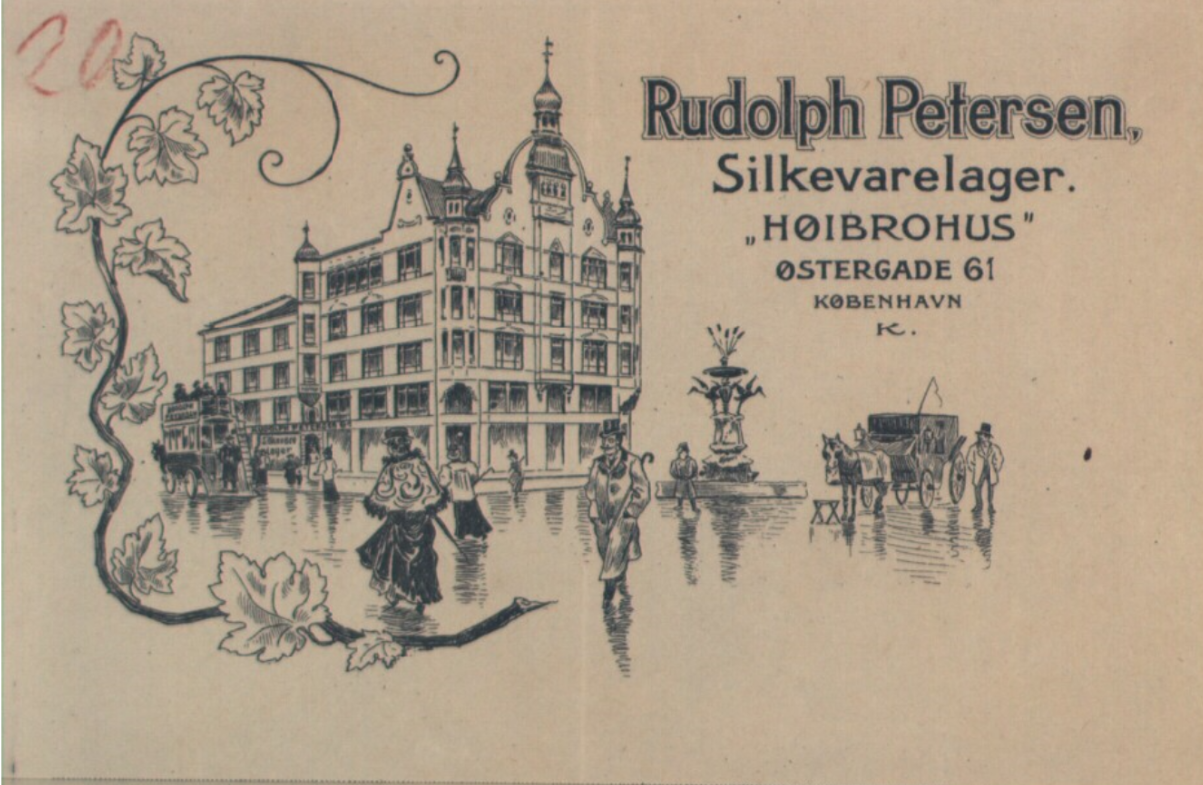
Højbrohus seen on an advertisement from the 1890s

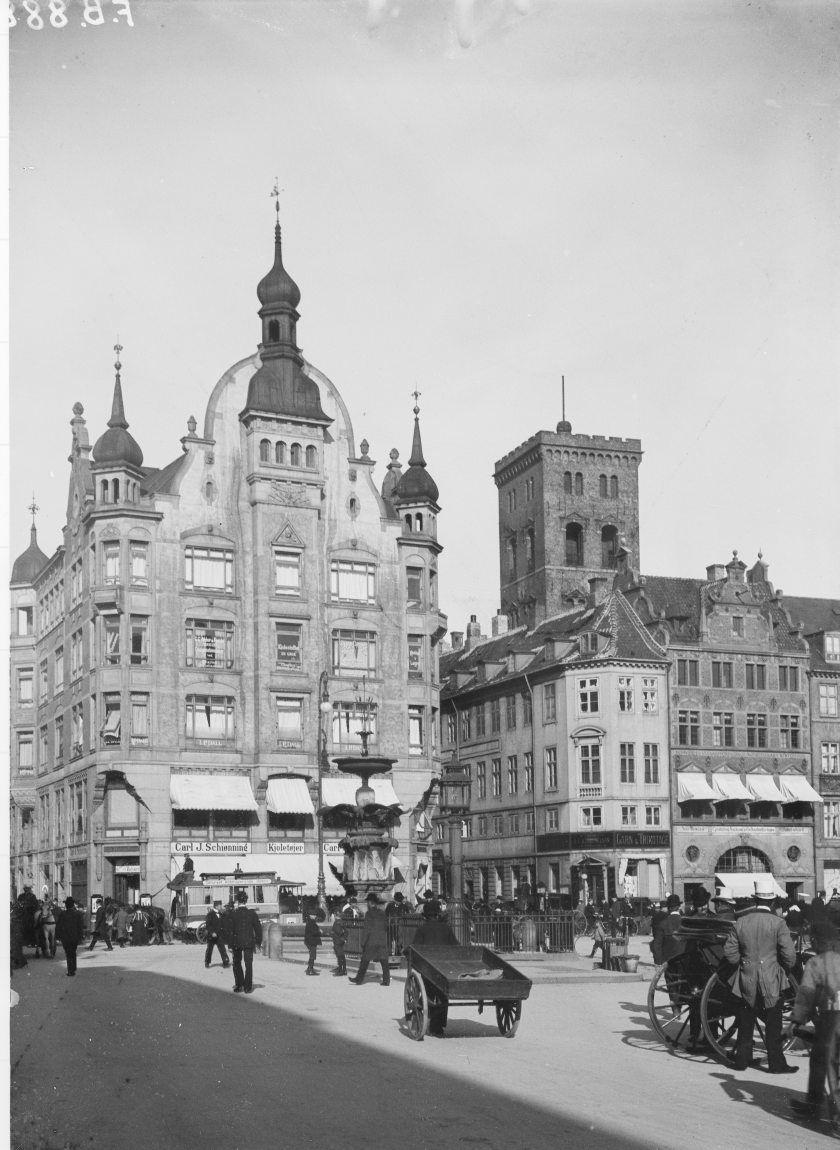
Højbrohus photographed by Fritz Theodor Benzen, c. 1900

== See also ==
- Store Strandstræde 19-21
