= C. F. Rich & Sønner =

Danish manufacturer of coffee substitute

C. F. Rich & Sønner was a Danish manufacturer of coffee substitute based in Copenhagen, Denmark.

== History ==
=== Early history ===
C. F. Rich & Sønner traces its history back to 1 August 1834 when Caspar Friderich Paulus Rich (1800-1874) purchased a coffee substitute factory established by artillery lieutenant Jacob Luders von Høyer. The production was based on the processing of dandelion roots collected on Copenhagen's ramparts and in the surrounding countryside. The factory was located in Sankt Peders Stræde and also comprised a retail outlet. A new and modern factory in Vester Voldgade was inaugurated in 1851. A number of similar manufacturers were established but Rich's factory maintained a leading position. Six of the competitors were in 1872 merged under the name De Danske Cikoriefabrikker.

The company was after Rich's death in 1874 continued by his sons Georg Rich (1839–1916) and Hans Adolph Rich (1846–1923) under the name C. F. Rich & Sønner's Kaffesurrogatfabrik. Sthyr & Kjær acquired a share of the company in 1885 and Georg Rich left it in 1889.

=== De Danske Cikoriefabrikker ===
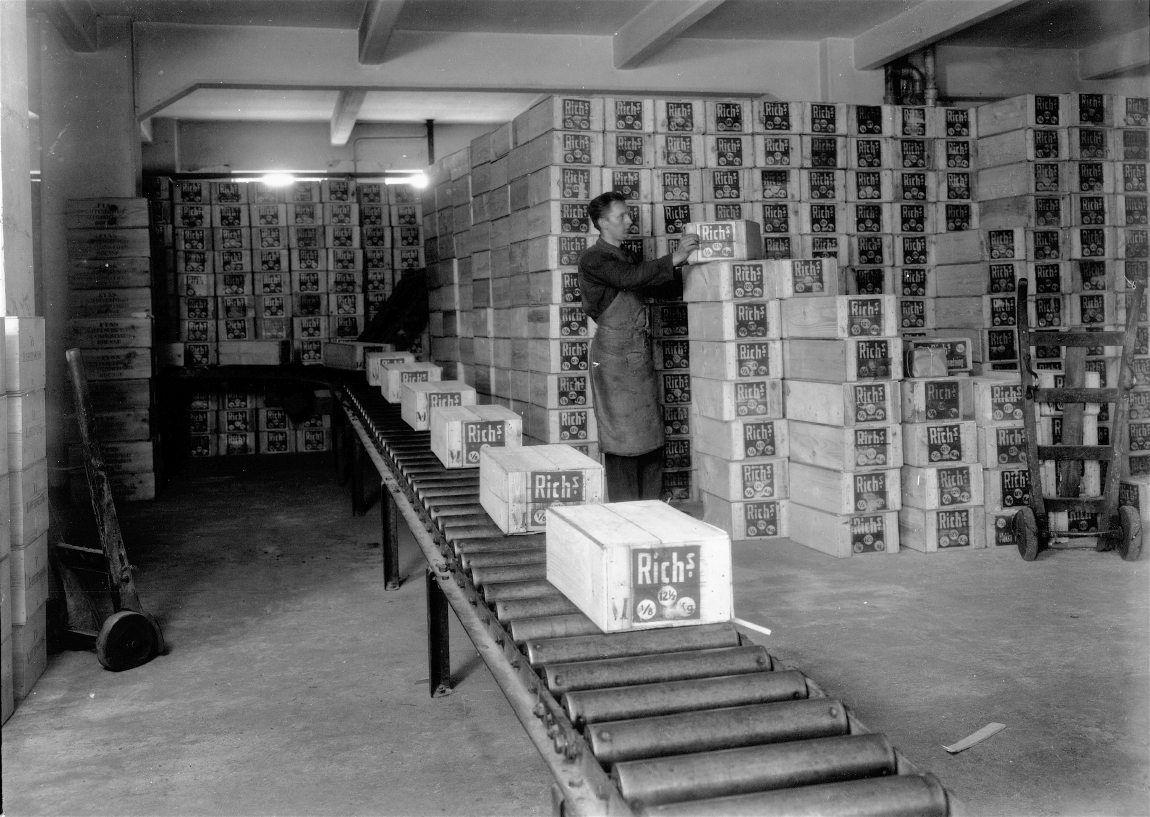
Rich's packets photographed by Peter Elfelt at Dansk Cikoriefabrik at Gerdasvej 3–5 in Valby

The company was in 1896 acquired by De Danske cikoriefabrikker but continued under its own name as an independent subsidiary.

The Rich's coffee substitute was later produced at Dansk Cikoriefabrik Gerdasvej 3–5 in Valby. Rich's was in the 1930s sold in 125 gram packets for 35 øre. Rich's coffee substitute experienced a renaissance during World War II when real coffee was unavailable with daily sales of up to 225,000 åackets. By the 1970s, the sale had declined to around 25,000 packets a day. The production of Rich's in Denmark was discontinued in 1983.

== Marketing ==
=== Trading cards ===
Rich's was from 1925 and up until the 1970s marketed with the use of trading cards with a wide range of an encyclopedic topics. These included:

- Inventors (24 cards, 1927-)
- Flowers (80 cards, 1968-)
- China I (48 cards, 1926-)
- Curiosity buildings (50 cards, 1926-)
- Tivoli Gardens (12 cards, 1925-)
- Prospects (12 cards, 1925-)
- Craftsmen (12 cards, 1925-)
- Military (12 cards, 1925-)
- Street life (12 cards, 1925-)
- Sports (15 cards, 1925-)
- Hunting (16 cards, 1926-)
- Experiments (18 cards, 1927-)
- People of the World (20 cards, 1927-)
- Means of transportation (20 cards, 1927-)
- Greenland (20 cards, 1926-)
- Age of Knights (25 cards, 1928-)
- School (24 cards, 1928-)
- Ancient Rome (25 cards, 1928-)
- Rosenborg (50 cards, 1930-)
- Butterflies (50 cards, 1926-)
- Puzzles (50 cards, 1927-)
- Capitals of Europe (26 cards, 1930-)
- Sailing ships (25 cards, 1928-)
- Bertel Thorvaldsen (25 cards, 1928-)
- Danish antiquities (25 cards, 1928-)
- Aviation (52 cards, 1925-)
- Birds (80 cards, 1972-)
- Stamps (25 cards, 1927-)
- Famous sportspeople (25 cards, 1927-)
- Danish naval heroes (25 cards, 1928-)
- From Copenhagen of the Past (50 cards, 1930-)
- Cirkus (20 cards, 1930-)
- Copenhagen (25 cards, 1928-)
- Zoological puzzle (25 cards, 1928-)
- Birds of China (50 cards, 1926-)
