= Vilhelm Bissen =

Danish sculptor

Christian Gottlieb Vilhelm Bissen
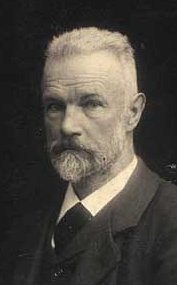
- Vilhelm Bissen by Frederik Riise
- Born: 5 August 1836; Copenhagen, Denmark
- Died: 20 April 1913 (aged 76); Copenhagen
- Education: Royal Danish Academy of Fine Arts
- Known for: Sculptor
- Movement: Neoclassicism (early works); Naturalism (later works)

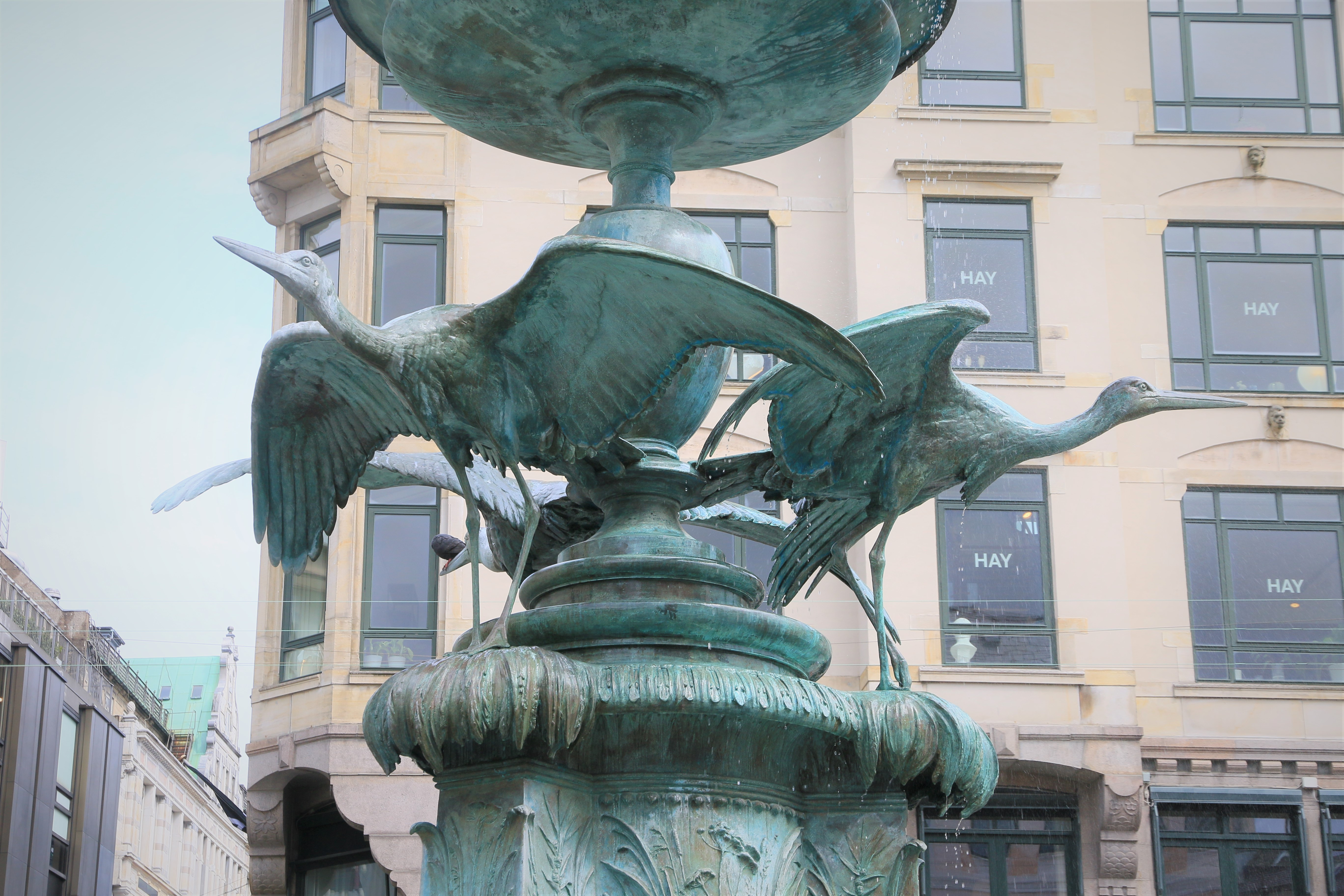
Stork Fountain on Amagertorv (1894)

Christian Gottlieb Vilhelm Bissen (5 August 1836 – 20 April 1913) was a Danish sculptor. He was also a professor at the Royal Danish Academy of Fine Arts with great influence on the next generation of Danish sculptors and for a while served as its director. Bissen was trained in the Neoclassical tradition from Bertel Thorvaldsen but after a stay in Paris around 1880, he was influenced by Naturalism. With the equestrian statue of Absalon he turned to Neo-romanticism.

== Biography ==
Vilhelm Bissen was born in Copenhagen as the son of Herman Wilhelm Bissen, one of the leading Danish sculptors of his day. Young Bissen received training in his father's studio from an early age and studied at the Royal Danish Academy of Fine Arts from 1853 to 1857, then in Rome between 1857 and 1863 and finally in Carrara from 1866 to 1867 where he studied marble techniques.

Upon his father's death in 1868, he returned to Denmark to continue his workshop and complete his ongoing projects. These included most notably the equestrian statue of King Frederik VII for the plaza in front of Christiansborg Palace (1873).

His own works included a number of statues of prominent Danes. He is mainly known for a number of statues around Copenhagen, including the equestrian statue of Absalon (1902) on Højbro Plads and the Stork Fountain (1894) on the adjoining Amagertorv. His notable works include N. F. S. Grundtvig at the Frederik's Church, Christian IV at Nyboder and Queen Consort Caroline Amalie in Rosenborg Castle Garden.

He was commissioned to make two statues of Absalon at the septicentennial of his death in 1901, an equestrian statue for Højbro Plads and another gilded copper figure for the facade of the new Copenhagen City Hall which was under construction at the time. He also produced a large number of animal sculptures of which the birds on the Stork Fountain (1894) on Amagertorv are the most famous.

He participated in Charlottenborg Spring Exhibition between 1857–1913 and at the World Exhibitions in London 1862, Paris 1867 and 1889 and at Chicago 1893. In 1871 he was elected a member of the Academy of Fine Arts and in 1887 a member of the Academy Council. He was Director of the Academy 1902–05. He held the positions of professor of sculpture at the Royal Danish Academy of Fine Arts 1889-1908.

== Gallery ==
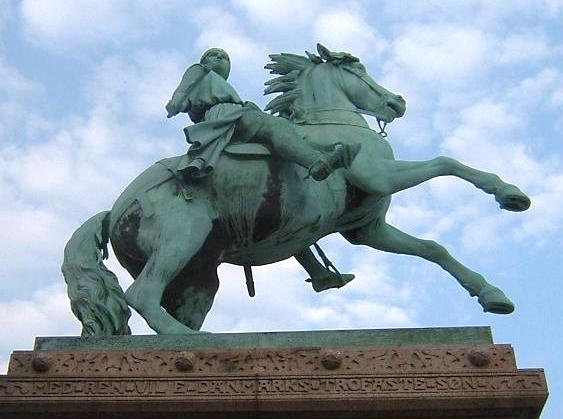
Absalon (1902)
Højbro Plads

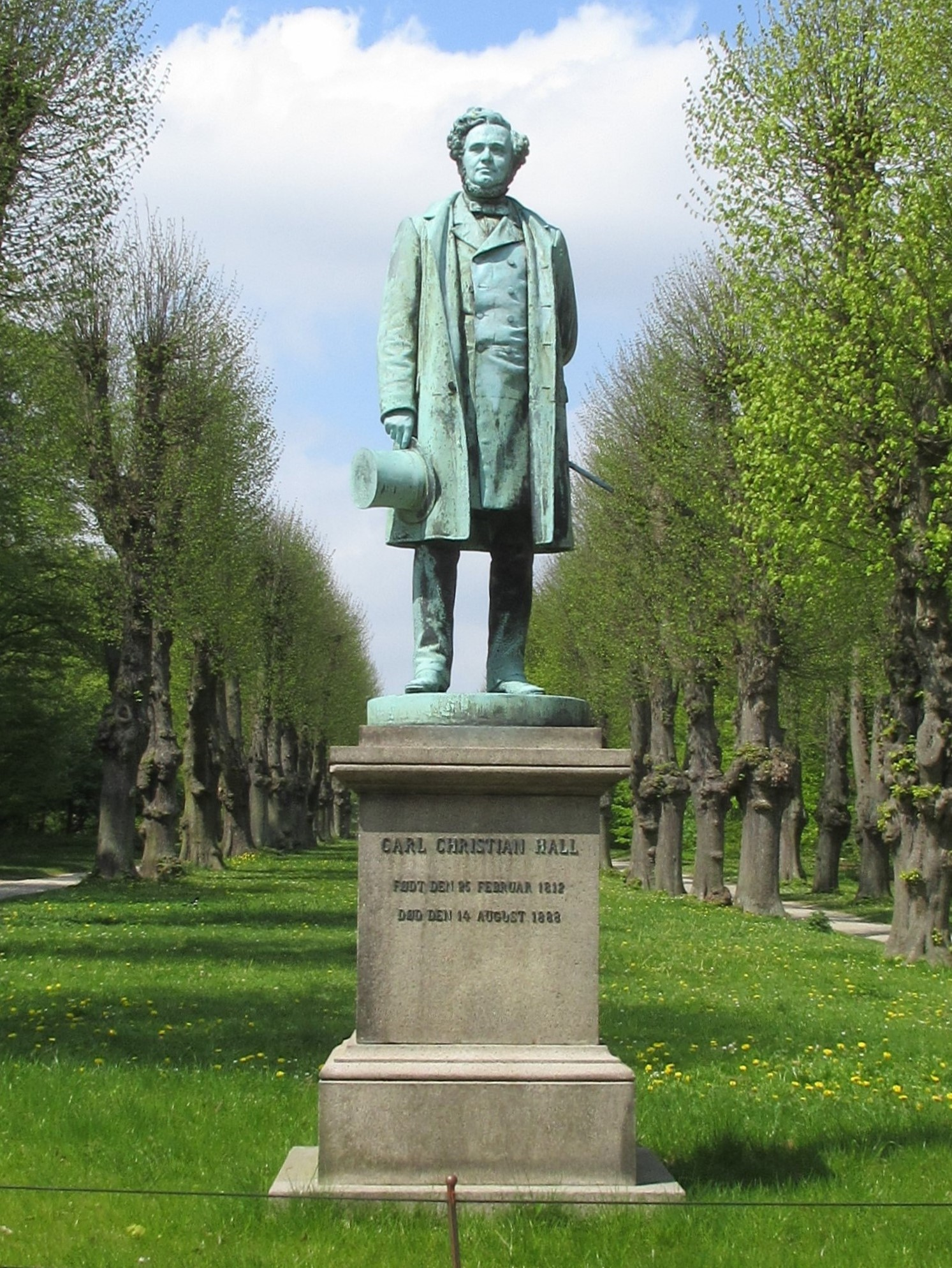
Carl Christian Hall (1890)
Søndermarken

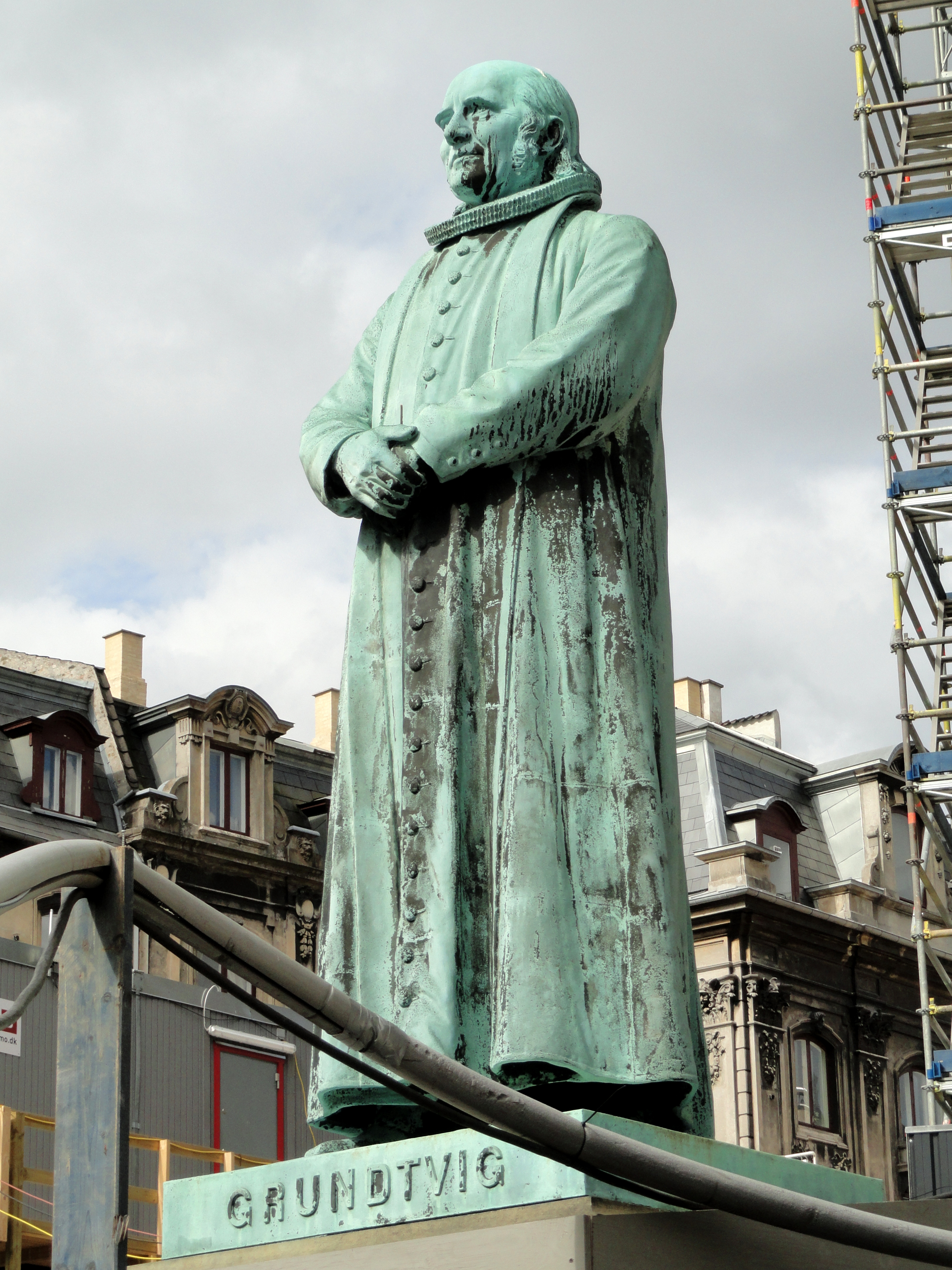
Grundtvig (1894)
Frederik's Church

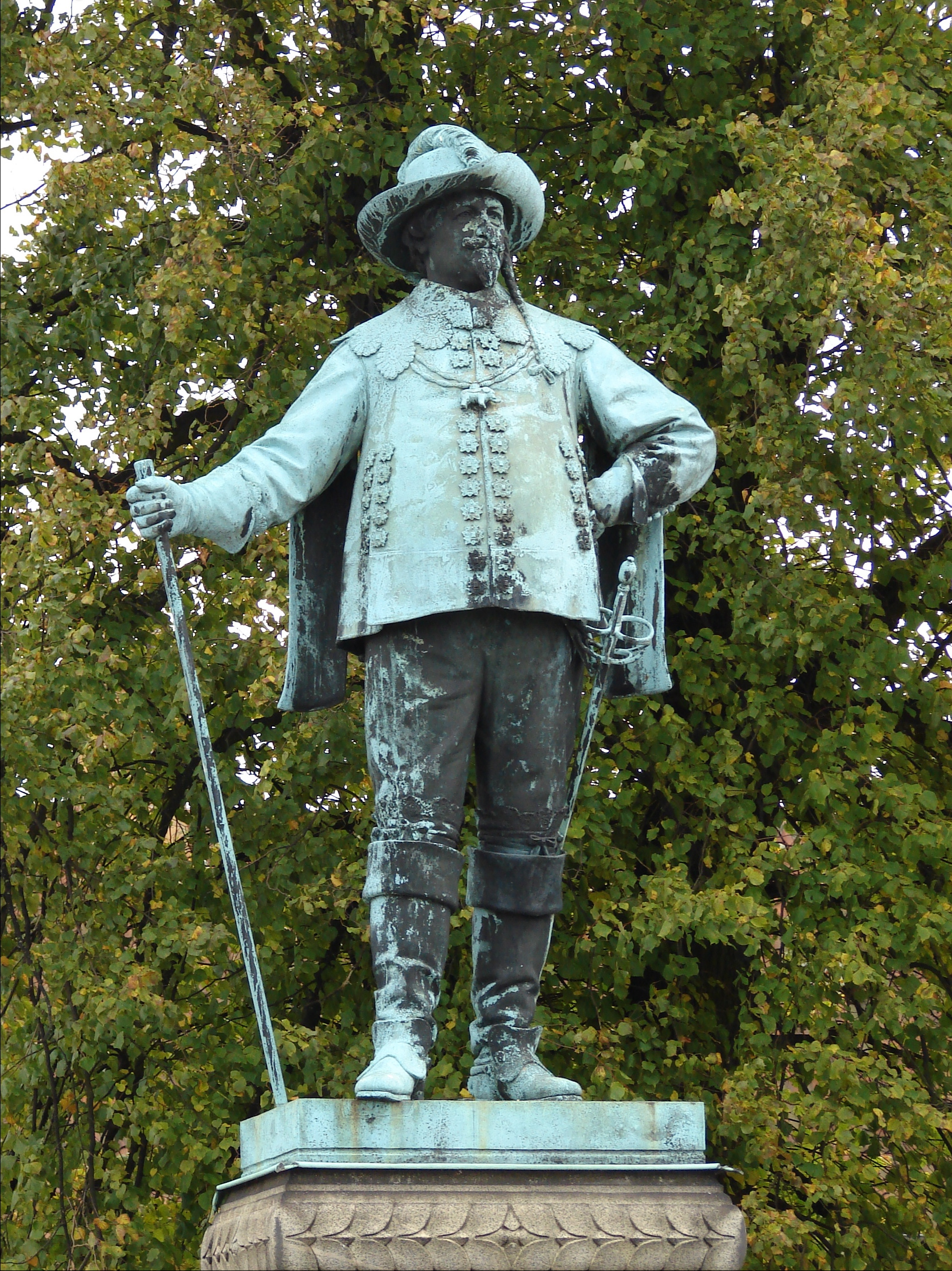
King Christian IV (1900)
Nyboder

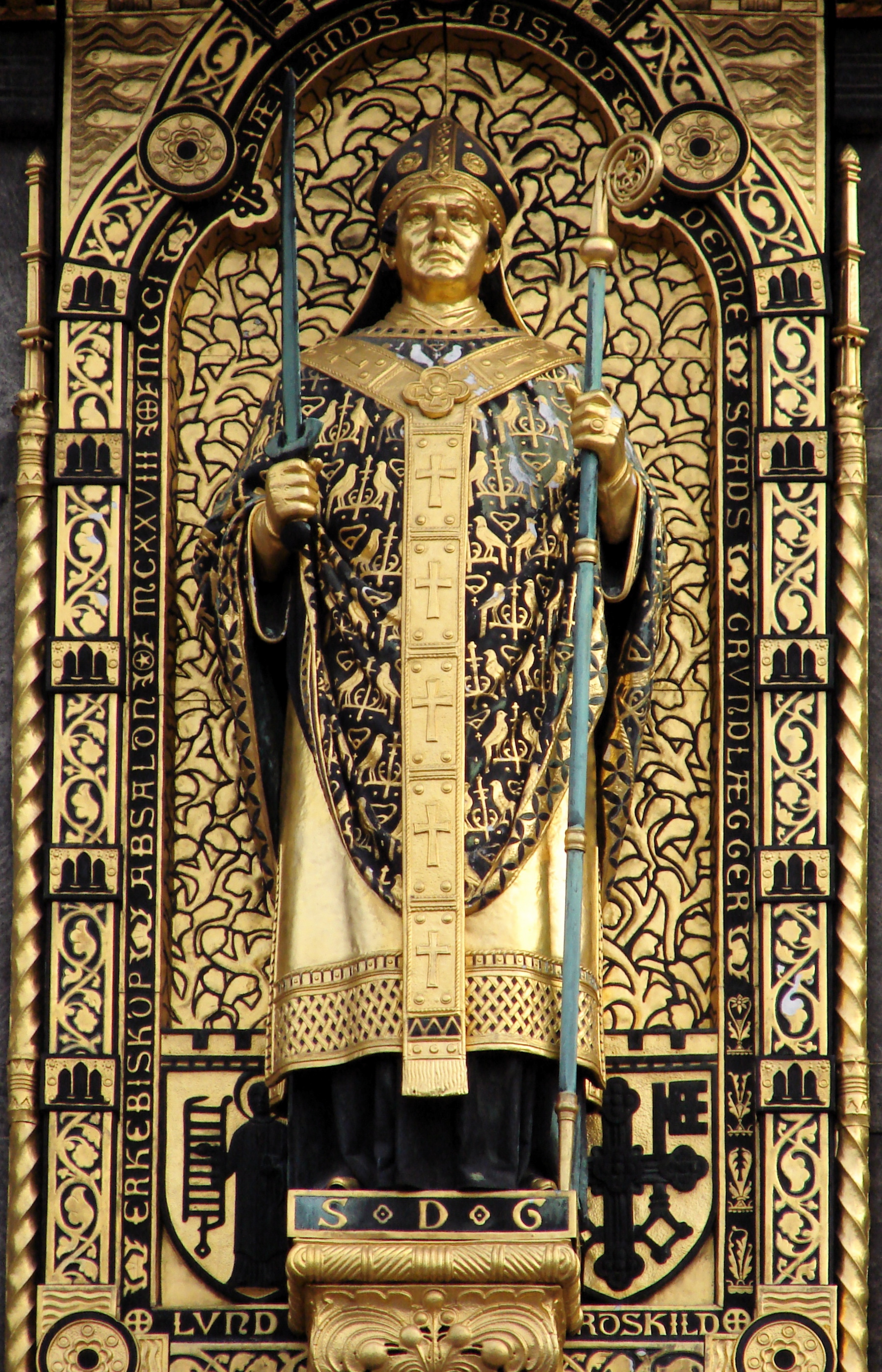
Absalon (1901)
Copenhagen City Hall

== See also ==
- Art of Denmark

Cultural offices
| Preceded by Ferdinand Meldahl | Director of the Royal Danish Academy of Fine Arts; 1902–1905 | Succeeded by Otto Bache |
| Preceded by Otto Bache | Director of the Royal Danish Academy of Fine Arts; 1906–1908 | Succeeded by Martin Nyrop |
