= Amagertorv =

Square in central Copenhagen, Denmark

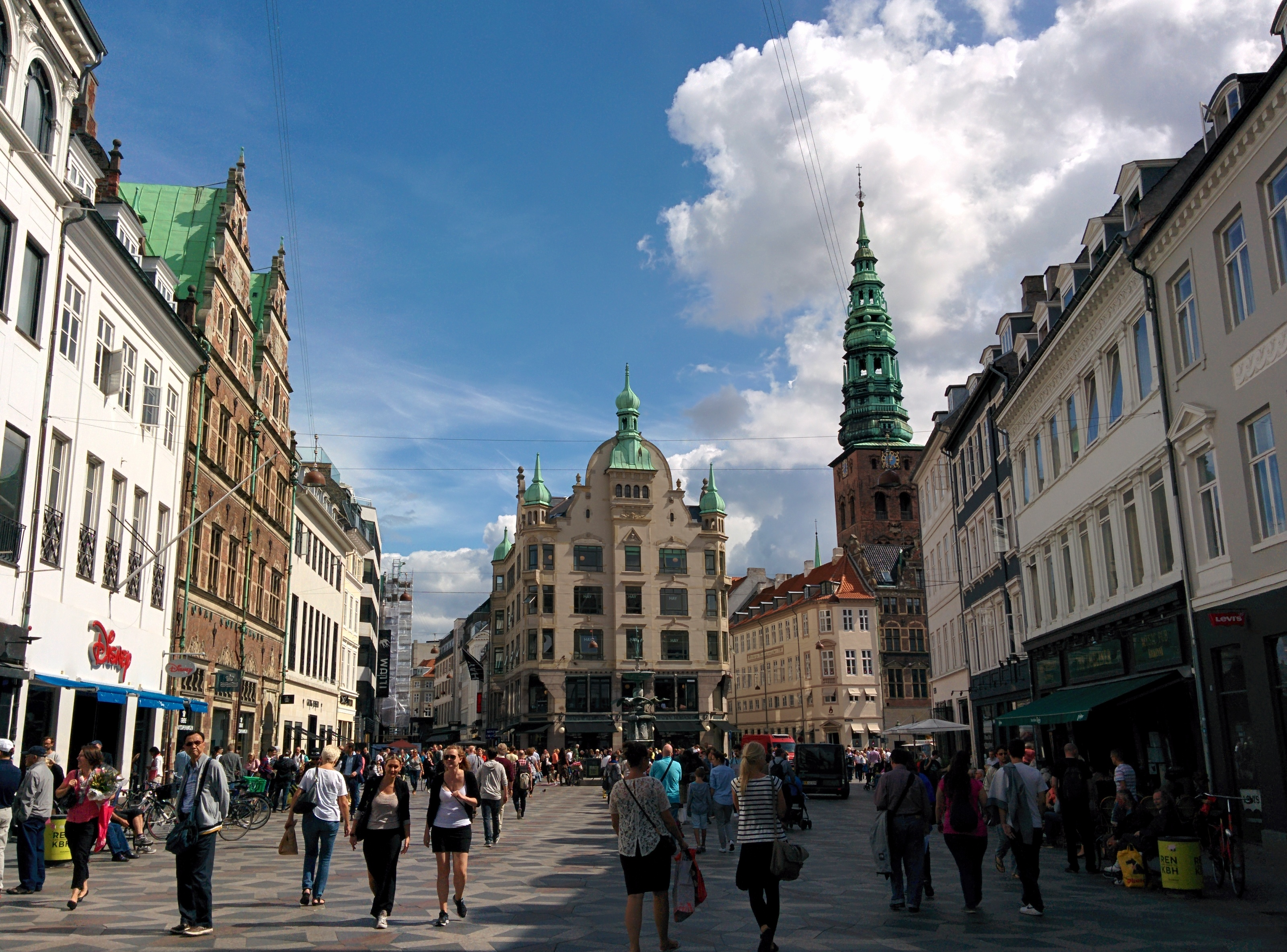
- Amagertorv
- Part of: Strøget
- Location: Indre By, Copenhagen, Denmark
- Postal code: 1160
- Coordinates: 55°40′42.96″N 12°34′38.64″E

Amagertorv (English: Amager Square) is a public square in the district of Indre By in central Copenhagen, Denmark. Today it forms part of the Strøget pedestrian zone, and is often described as the most central square in Copenhagen. Second only to Gammeltorv, it is also one of the oldest, taking its name from the Amager farmers who in the Middle Ages came into town to sell their produce at the site.

Now the square is a central junction in the heart of Copenhagen, dominated by its Stork Fountain and a number of buildings, the oldest of which dates back to 1616. In opposite directions, Strøget extends towards Kongens Nytorv and the City Hall Square, the two largest squares in Copenhagen, to the northwest Købmagergade leads to Nørreport, the busiest railway station in Denmark, and to the southeast Højbro Plads connects to Slotsholmen across Højbro Bridge, and from there onwards to Christianshavn and Amager on the other side of the harbour.

The paving is from 1993 and was designed by Bjørn Nørgaard. It consists of a pattern of pentagonal granite stones in five colours.

== History ==
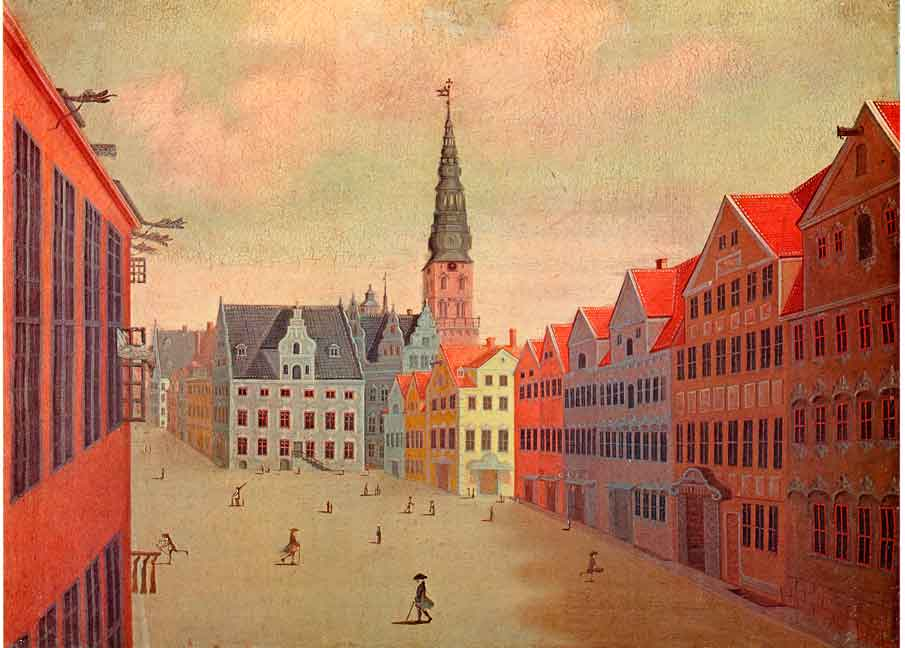
Amagertorv depicted by J. Rach and H. H. Eegberg in 1749, featuring a combination of 17th- and 18th-century buildings

Amagertorv dates back to the Middle Ages when Copenhagen was a small fishing village called Havn, the site was the main corridor between the village and the beach. In 1449 it is referred to as the Fishmonger's Market and in 1472 the name Amagertorv first appears. The name derives from the Amager farmers who came into town to sell their goods.

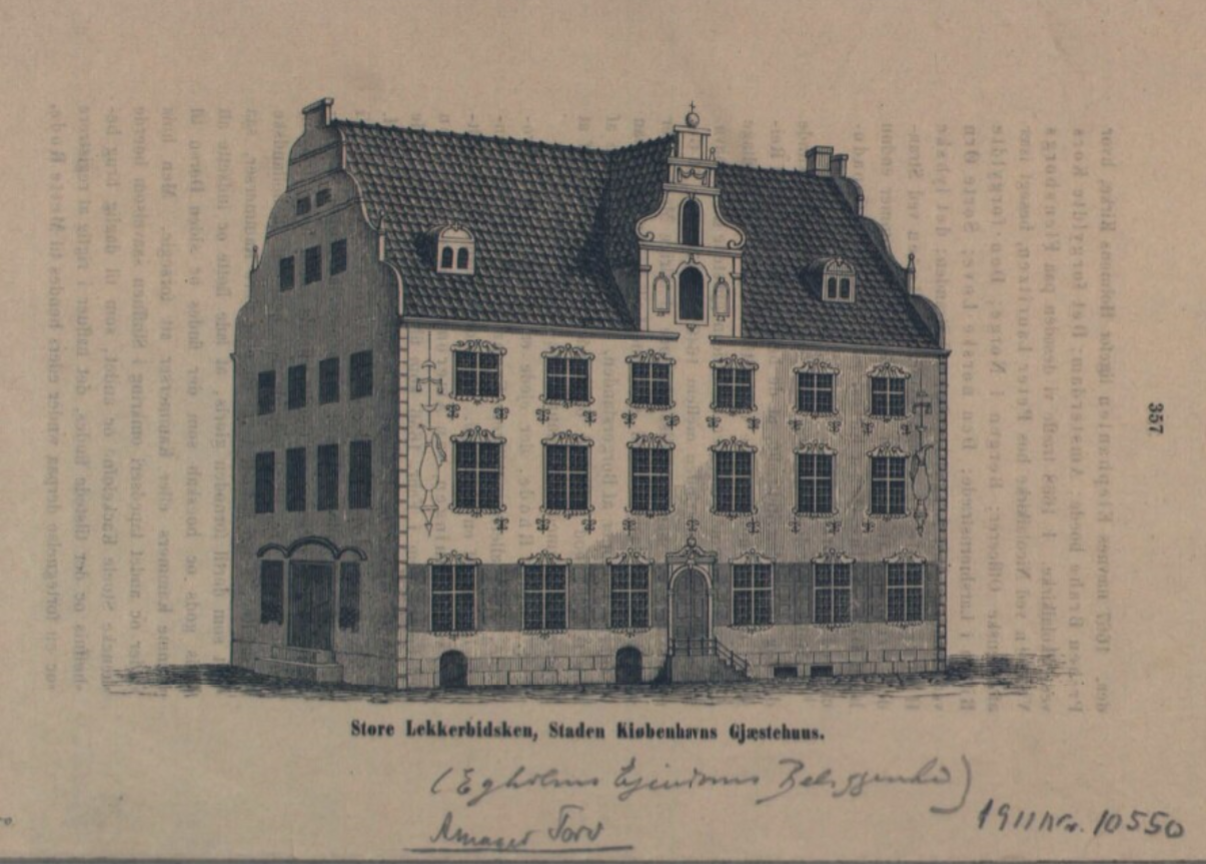
Store Lækkerbisken

In the 16th and 17th century the square became a setting of festivals and chivalrous tournaments. In the same time, Amagertorv continued to be the premier marketplace of the city, and from 28 July 1684 all sale of fresh produce was to take place in the square. From 1656 the city's leading inn was also located on the square.

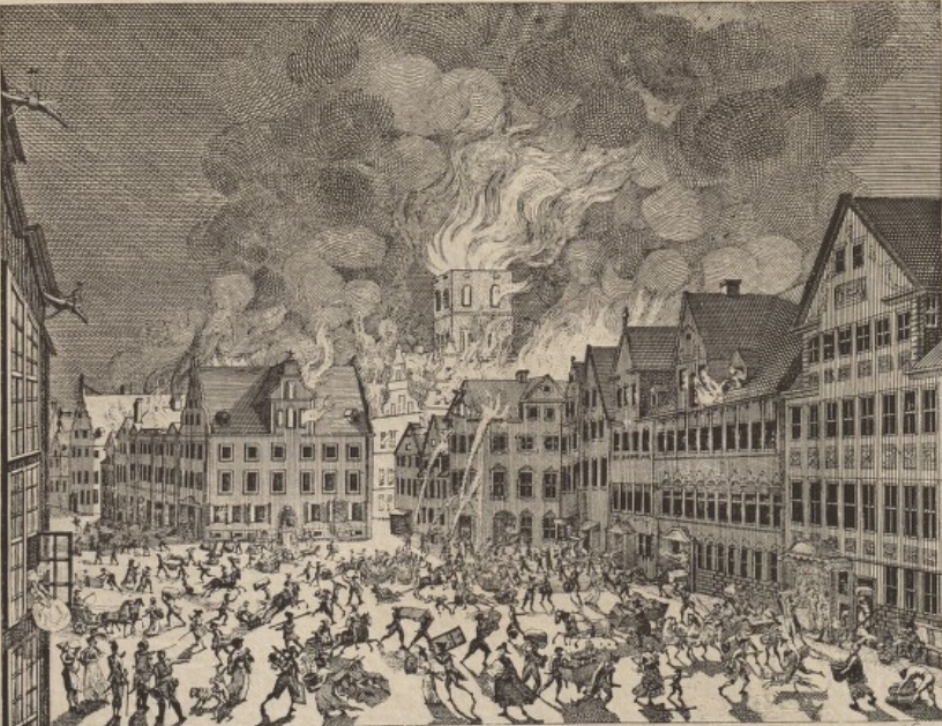
Amagertorv during the Copenhagen Fire of 1795

Few buildings on the square survived the Copenhagen Fire of 1795. The adjoining Højbro Plads was established after the fire.

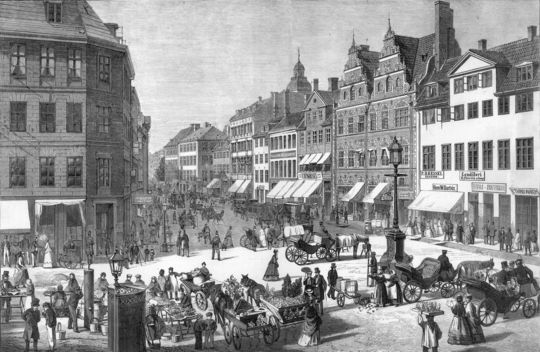
Store Lækkerbisken

In 1868 the market activities were moved to Christianshavn. In 1894, the Stork Fountain was constructed. It was a present to Crown Prince Frederik (later Frederik VIII) and Crown Princess Louise in connection with their silver wedding. In 1962, the square was closed to traffic with the establishment of the Strøget pedestrian zone.

== Buildings ==
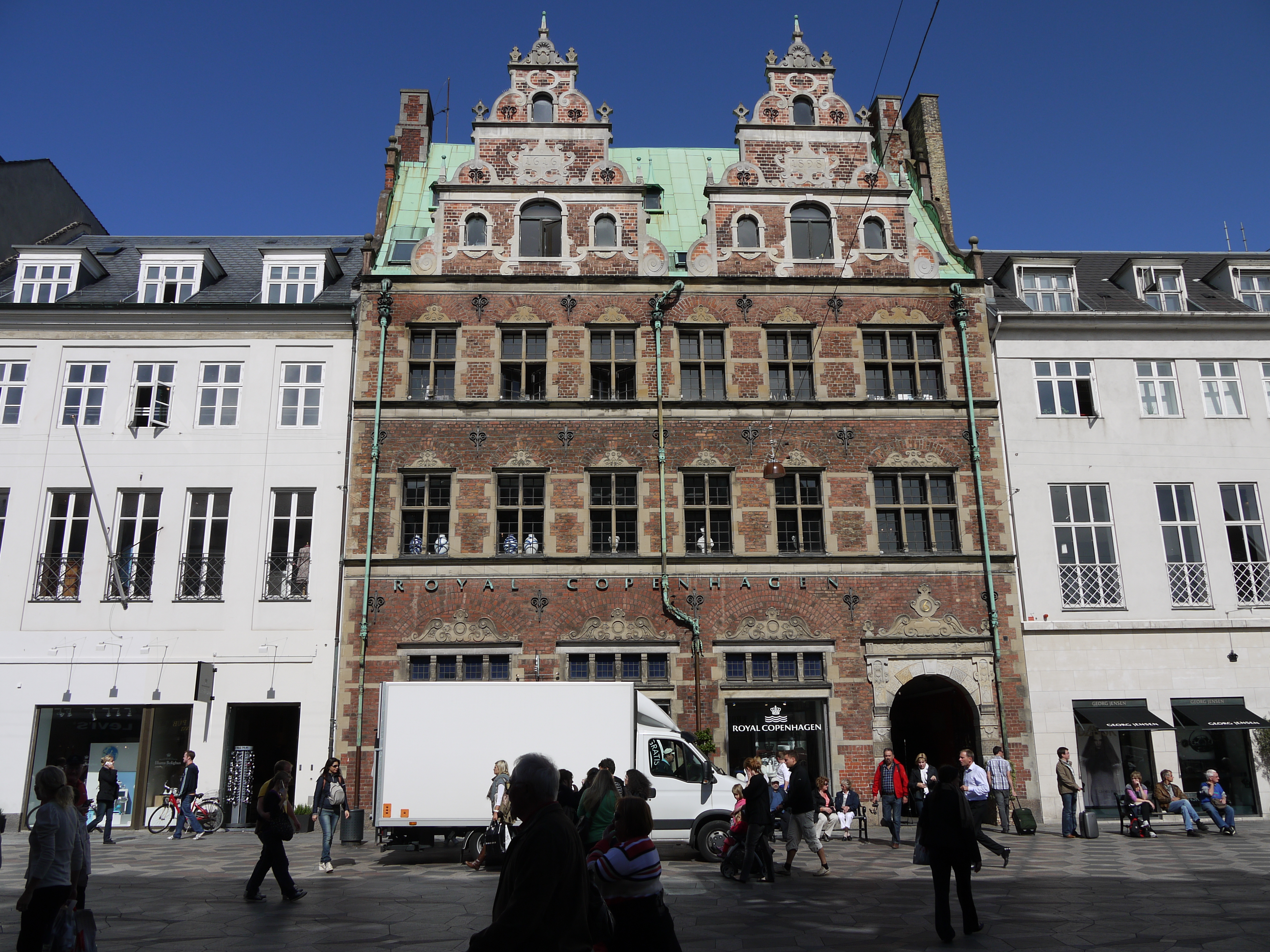
Mathias Hansen House at No. 6

The Church of the Holy Ghost, located at the western end of the square, is the oldest surviving church in Copenhagen.

The Mathias Hansen House (No. 6) was built in 1616 for Mathias Hansen, from 1622 the Mayor of Copenhagen. Typically of the Dutch Renaissance style, the house is built in red bricks with sandstone decorations, has a Dutch gable and a copper roof. The copper drainpipes are decorated with dragon's heads. The building was restored in 1898 by Professor Hans Jørgen Holm. The gateway is flanked by two cannon barrels used to protect the gate from entering carts.

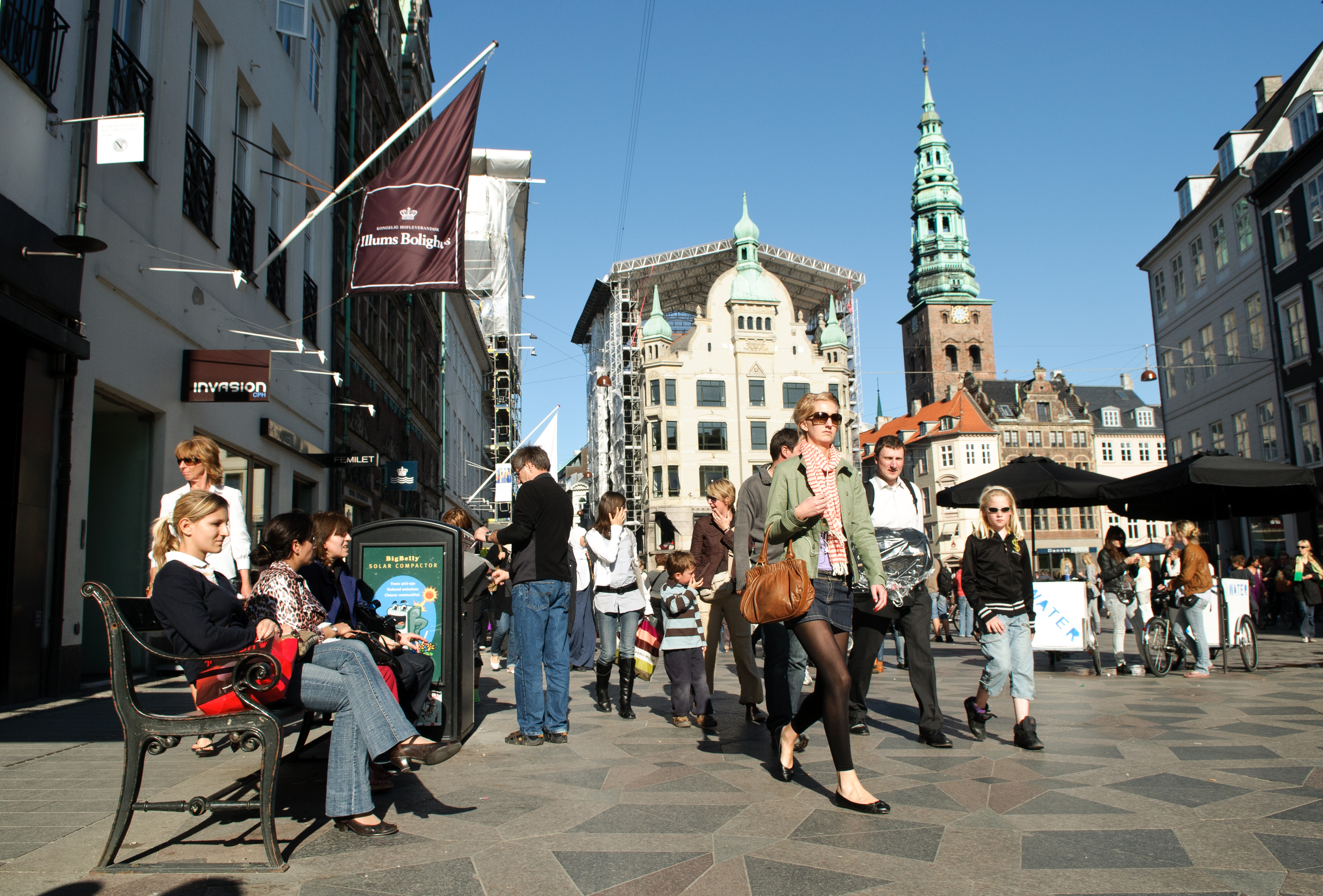
Højbrohus

No. 9 was built in 1798–1800 for linen merchant J. A. Bechmann. The original shop front at street level was altered in 1830 and again in 1870. The tobacco company W. Ø. Larsen has a small pipe museum in the building.

The Ole Haslund House (No. 14) is an example of late-19th century Historicism. The current design is from 1867. The windows have mullions executed as small Hermes figures carrying Ionic capitals.

Klostergården at No. 29 is a former convent. The building is from 1798-00 where it replaced a house designed by Caspar Frederik Harsdorff which was destroyed in the Great Fire of 1795. The convent was founded in 1759.

Løveapoteket (No. 33), Copenhagen's first pharmacy, was based at the site from 1620 to 1969. The current building was built for the pharmacy in 1907–1908 to a design by Victor Nyebøllle and Chr. Brandstrup. It replaced a building by C. F. Harsdorff.

== Shopping ==
The Illum department store has been located on the corner of Strøget and Købmagergade since the 1890s. The Illum Furniture Store is also located at Amagertorv. Royal Copenhagen has a flagship in the historic building at No. 6.

== In popular culture ==
Amagertorv is used as a location in the films Ud i den kolde sne (1934), Manden på Svanegården (1972), Romantik på Sengekanten (1973) and Mafiaen – det er osse mig (1974).

== See also ==
- Gråbrødretorv
- Gammel Strand
- Illums Bolighus
