= Skovgaard =

Skovgaard is a surname meaning "forest farm". Notable people with the surname include:

- Andreas Skovgaard, Danish footballer
- Anne Skovgaard, see Anne Statt (1955–2024), English-Danish badminton player
- Axel Skovgaard, Danish violinist
- Christian John Skovgaard, Danish badminton player
- Georgia Skovgaard (1828–1868), Danish embroiderer
- Irene Skovgaard, Danish author and composer
- Joakim Skovgaard, Danish painter
- Niels Skovgaard, Danish painter and sculptor
- P. C. Skovgaard, Danish painter
- Steen Skovgaard, Danish badminton player
- Suzette Skovgaard, see Suzette Holten, Danish painter
