= Statue of N. F. S. Grundtvig =

Statue in Copenhagen, Denmark

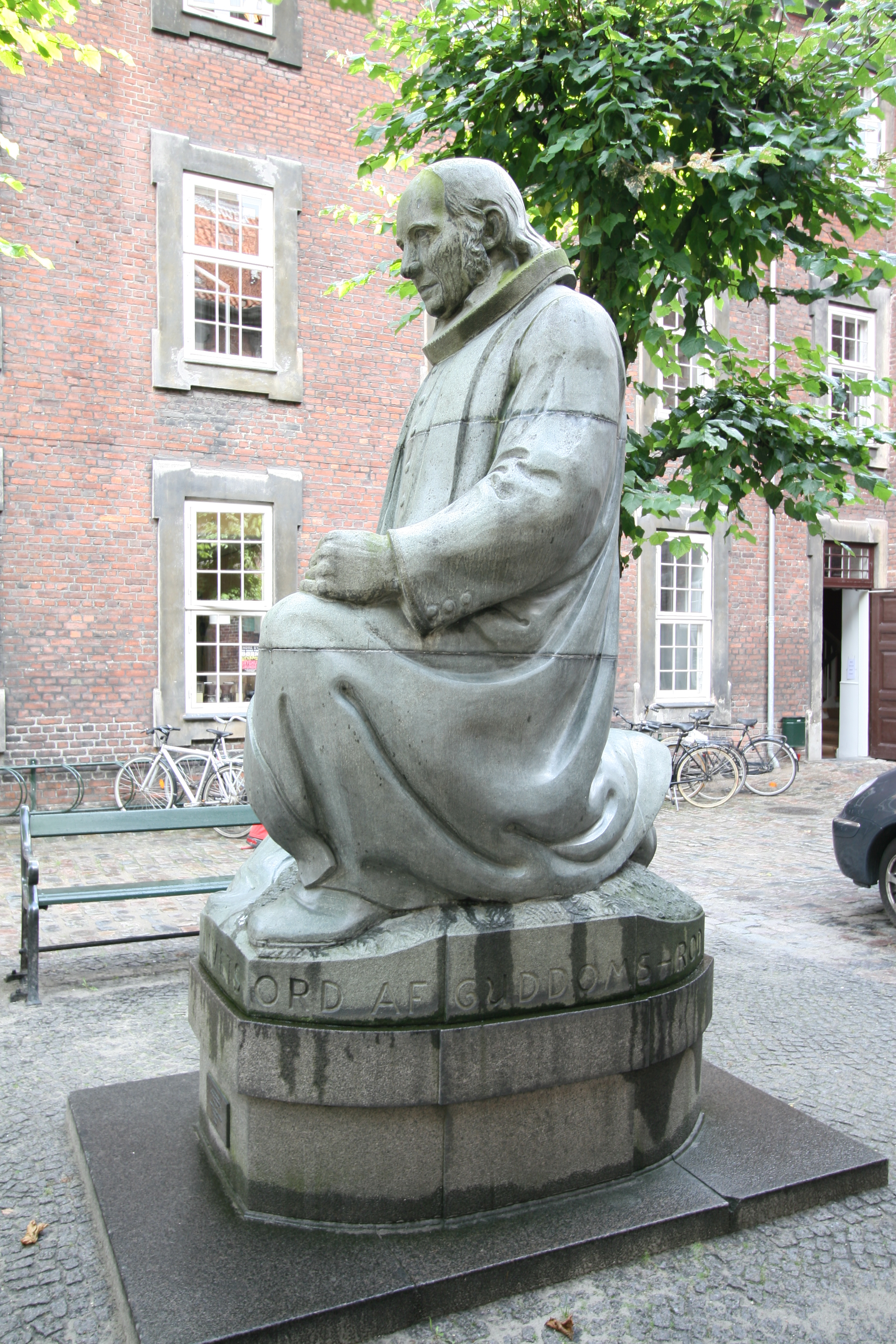
The statue.

The Statue of N. F. S, Grundtvig, situated in the central courtyard of Vartorv, close to the City Hall Square in central Copenhagen, Denmark, was created by Niels Skovgaard. It depicts N. F. S. Grundtvig kneeling by the Spring of Life.

== Description ==
Grundtvig is depicted kneeling by the Spring of Life. Skovgaard has signed the sculpture with his monigram (NKS) and the inscription Grundtvig og Livskilden (Grundtvig and the Spring of Life) on the sole of his back-facing left shoe.

Niels Skovgaard based his portrait of Grundtvig on his father P. C. Skovgaatrd's 1847 portrait drawing of Grundtvig. It is believed that P. C. Skovgaard's drawing was inspired by a three years older drawing by Johan Vilhelm Gertner.

== History ==
=== Background ===
Niels Skovgaard was the son of P. C. Skovgaard and Georgia Skovgaard. Grundtvig was a close friend of the family. He conducted the ceremony at the parents' wedding and their children Niels, Joakim and Suzette were also baptized by him. Niels Skovgaard and his brother Joakim were also good friends of Grundtvig's two sons. Throughout his career, Skovgaard received numerous commissions from independent Grundtvigian congregations and folk high Schools.

Grundtvig died in 1872. A statue of him by Vilhelm Bissen was installed at the Frederick's Church construction site in 1894. In 1904, Rasmus Bøgebjerg proposed another Grundtvig statue. His proposal depicted Grundtvig with a lark sitting on his left hand. The proposal was subject to a prolonged debate.

=== The two competitions ===
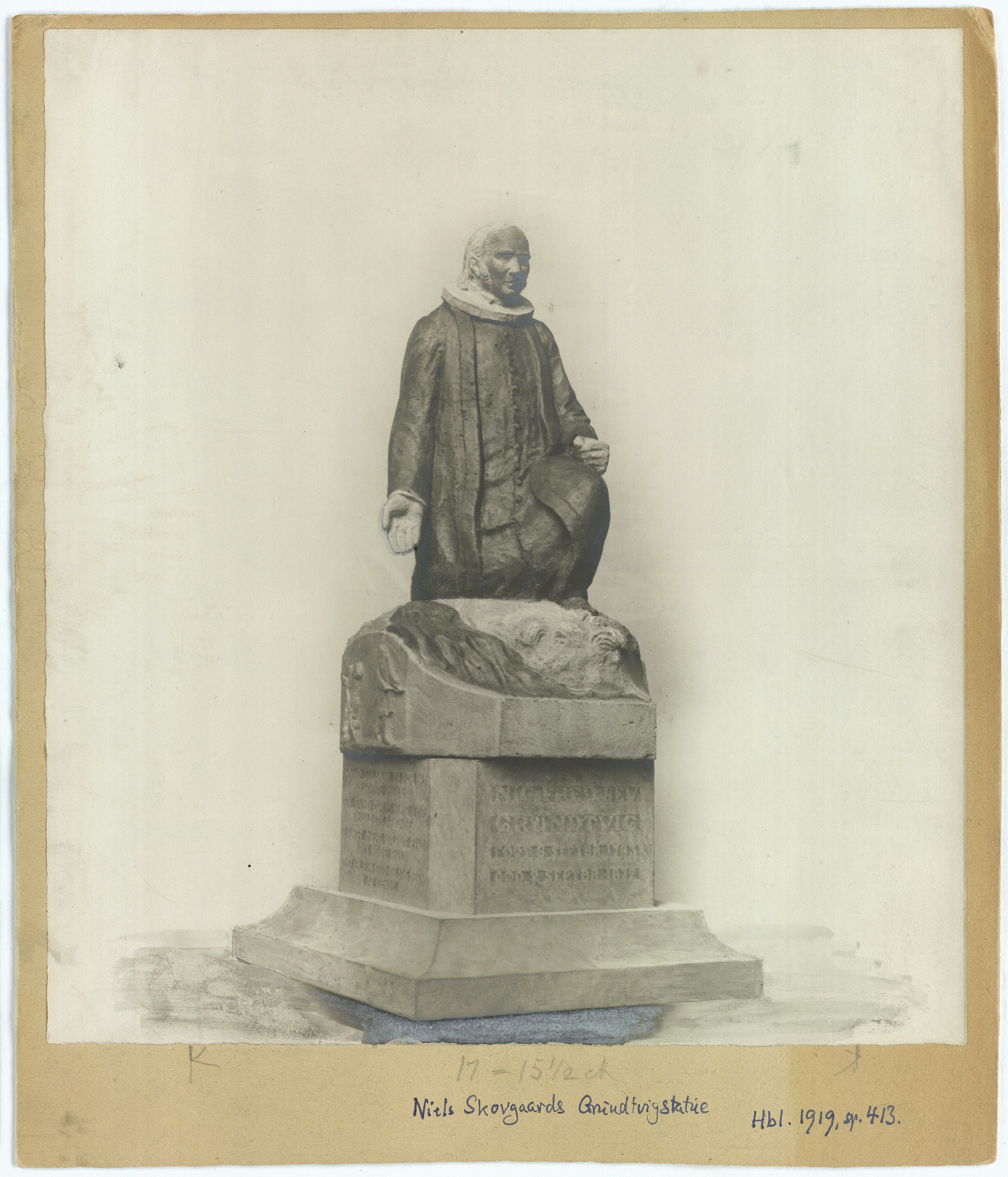
Skovgaard drawing from 1919.

In 1912, a competition for a Grundtvig monument was launched. Skovgaard's proposal received an award but none of the 32 submissions were selected as the final winner. Skovgaard was around the same time working on a portrait relief of Grundtvig for the Grundtvig House on Studiestræde. A new invited competition was launched in 1913. The new competition was won by Niels Hansen Jacobsen. Peder Vilhelm Jensen-Klint awarded second prize. It was later decided by the jury to go with Jensen-Klint's proposal. He had proposed a bell tower. It was later expanded into the monumental Grundtvig's Church (1921–1940).

=== Creating the sculpture ===
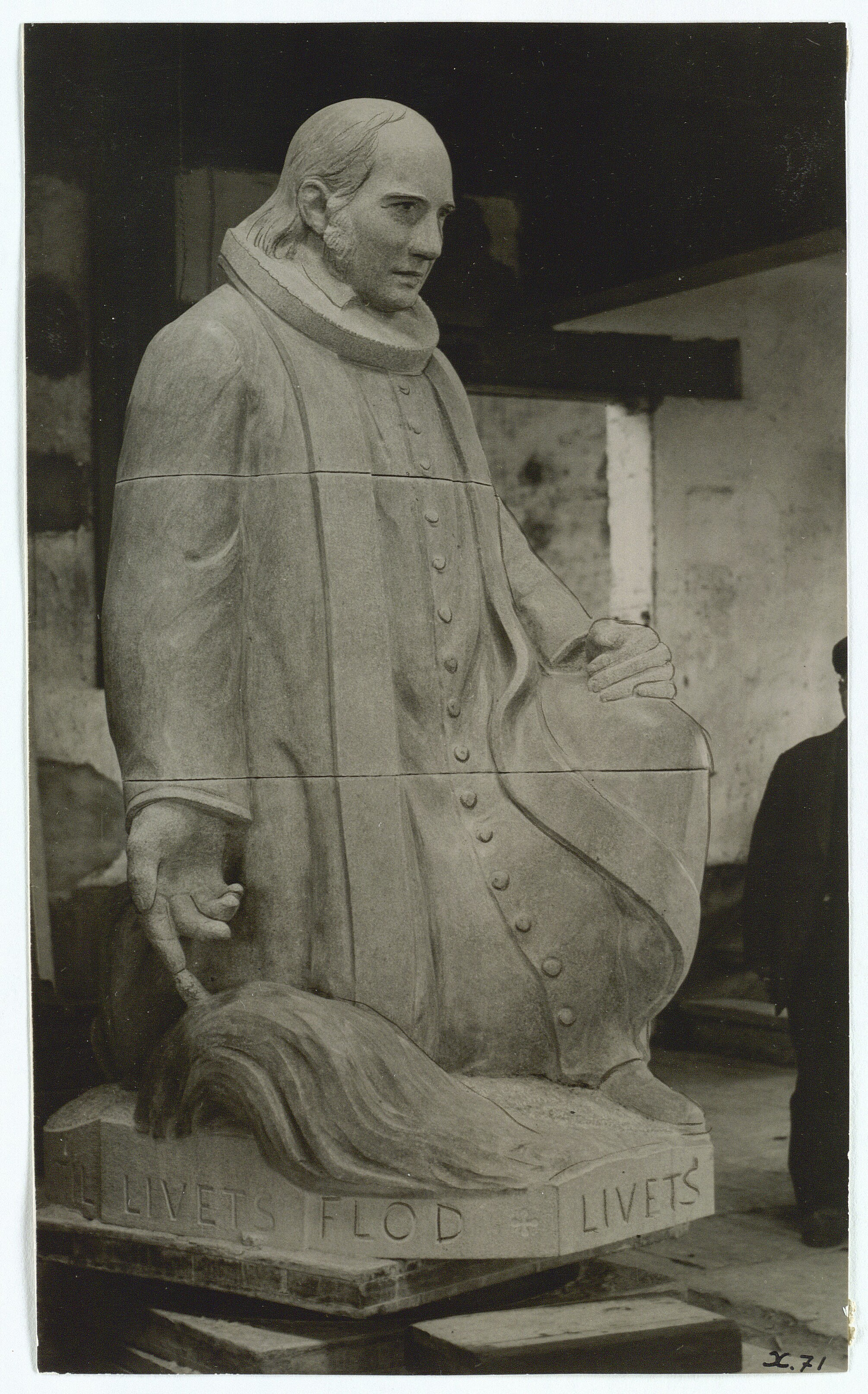
The completed statue at Lyngby Sugar Factory.

Skovgaard kept working on his 1912 proposal. In 1925 he was finally commissioned by the Nt Carlsberg Foundation to create a granite version of the sculpture for Vartov's courtyard. It was executed with fewer details than the original proposal. It was unveiled at Vartov in 1932.

== Preliminary works ==
Two preliminary models of the work are in the collection of the National Gallery of Denmark.

- Statuette of magnesite, cm (h) x c, (w) x 35 cm (d), acquired in 1919
- Statuette of plaster, acquired in 1925
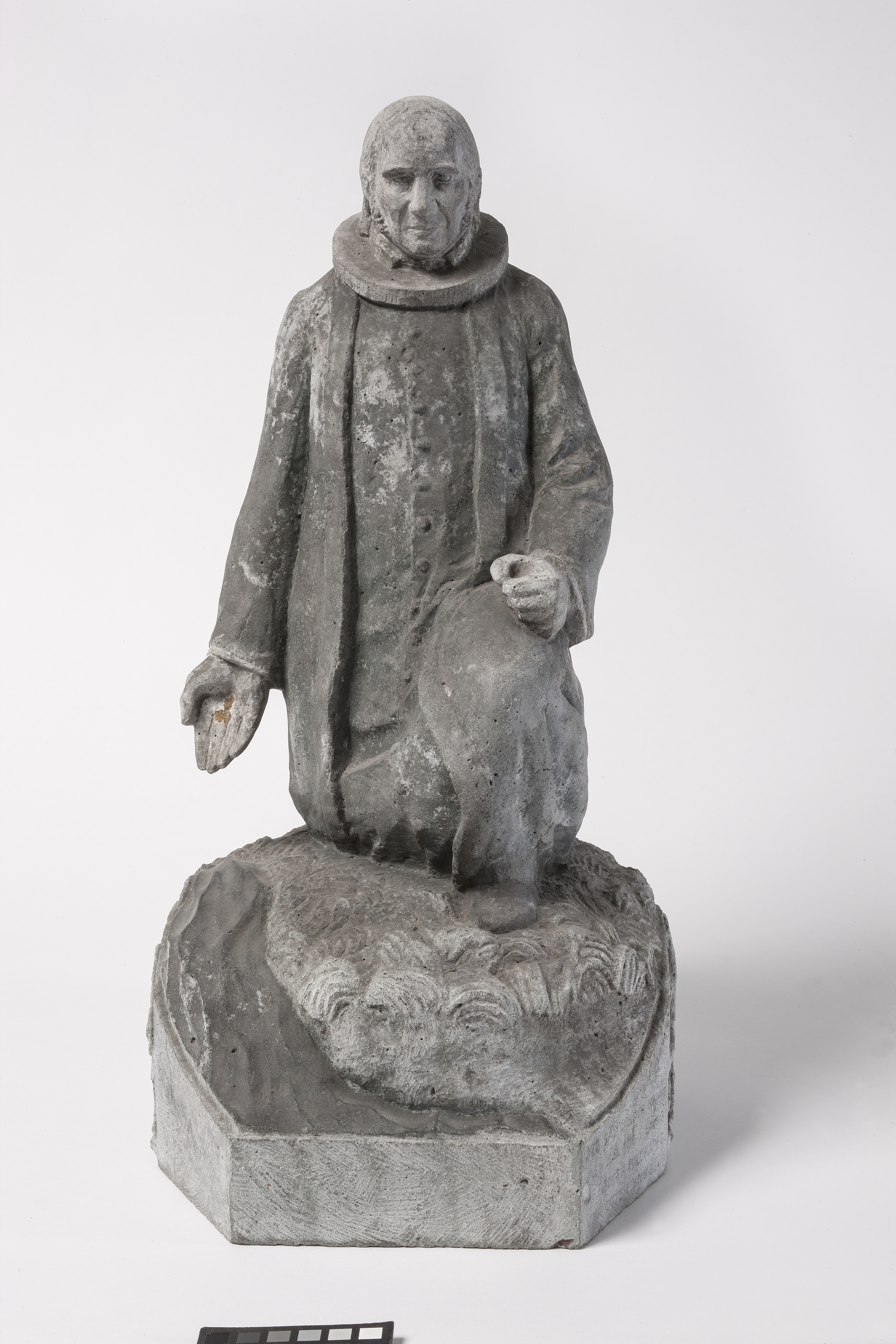
Statuette of magnesite, acquired by the National Gallery of Denmark in 1919.

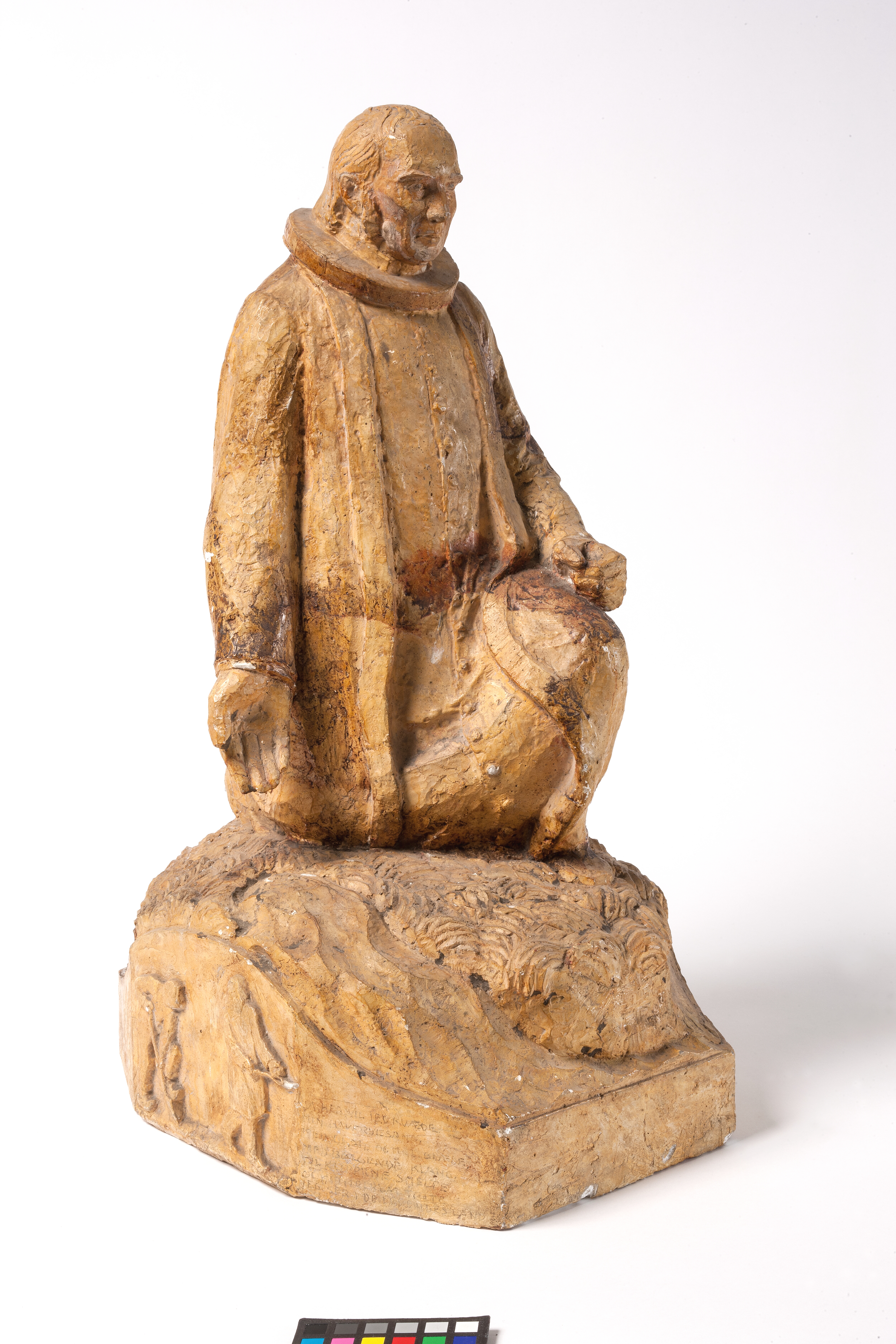
Painted plaster model, acquired by the National Gallery of Denmark in 1925.
