= Aggersborggade =

Street in Copenhagen, Denmark

Aggersborggade is a street in the Østerbro district of Copenhagen, Denmark. It runs from Classensgade in the south to Holsteinsgade in the north and is intersected by Willemosegade.

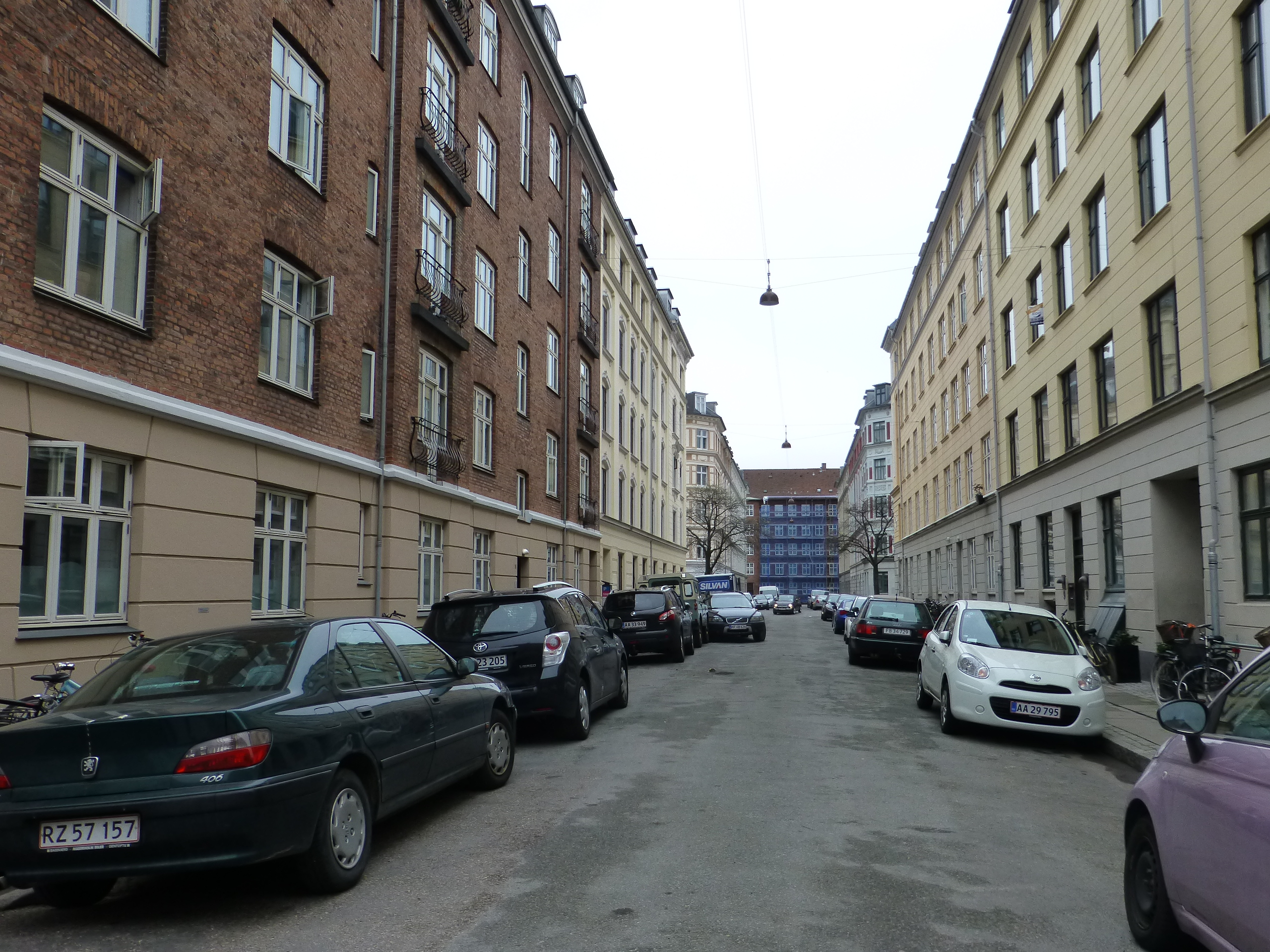
A photo of a street Aggersborggade in Østerbro in Copenhagen

== History ==
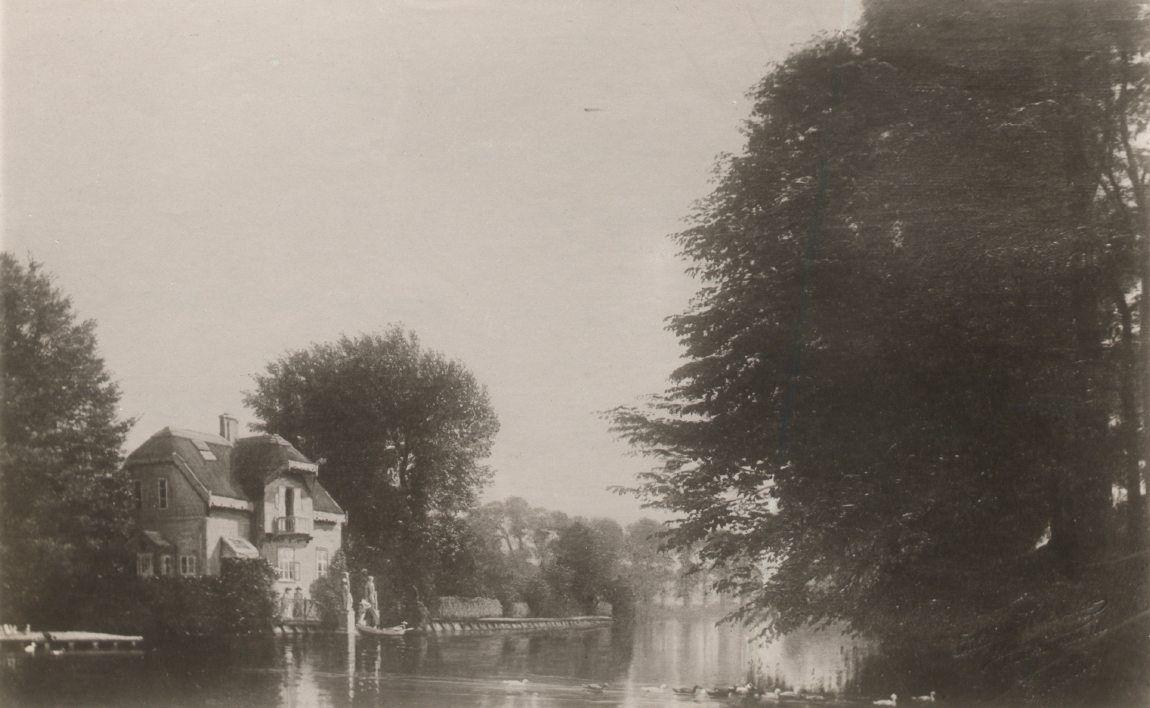
Villa Aggersborg in 1865

The street takes its name after broker Hans Christian Aggersborg (1812–1895), a founding partner of Bechgaard & Aggersborg, who purchased a piece of land at the site when Classen's Garden was sold off in lots in 1846.

A number of former fishing ponds connected by canals were located on the land. He constructed a country house on a small isle in one of the lakes, naming it Aggersborg. He lived in an apartment at Holmens Kanal 4 but spent the summers in Østerbro.

Aggersborg was the maternal uncle of the painter P. C. Skovgaard. Skovgaard, who was from North Zealand, had lived with Aggersborg when he just 14 years old moved to Copenhagen to study at the Royal Danish Art Academy. Skovgaard's children—Joakim, Niels, and Suzette—spent a lot of time at Villa Aggersborg.

Hans Christian Aggersborg kept Villa Aggersborg until his death in 1895 but it had by then fallen into a state of disrepair. The house was then demolished, the lakes filled and the land had three years later been sold off in lots. The street was originally a private road linking Classensgade with Holsteinsgade.

== See also ==
P. C. Skovgaard House
