= P. C. Skovgaard House =

Building in Copenhagen Municipality, Denmark

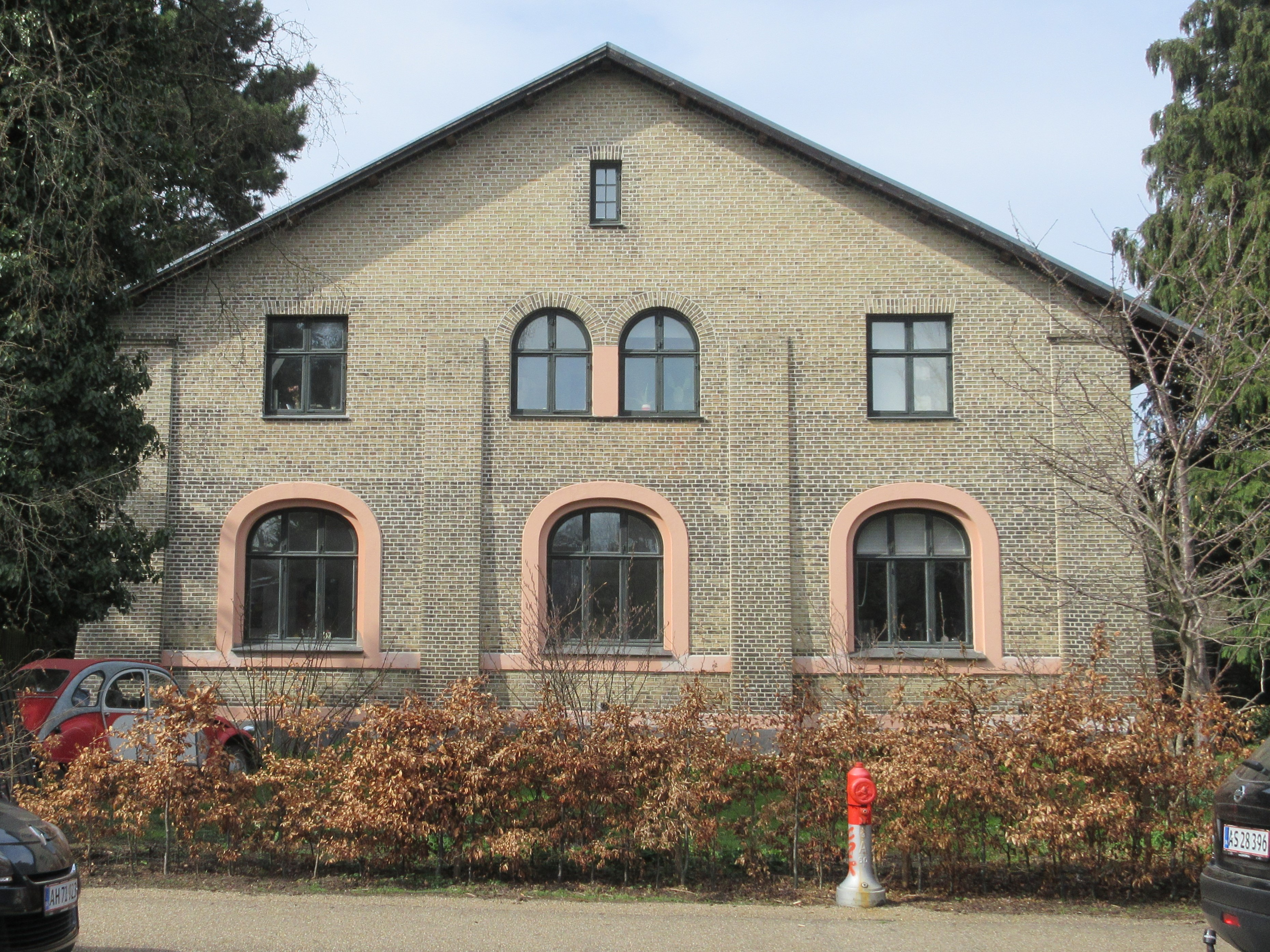
- Thott Mansion seen from the square
- Interactive map of the P. C. Skovgaard House area

General information
- Architectural style: Neoclassical
- Location: Copenhagen, Denmark
- Coordinates: 55°42′4.43″N 12°35′3.05″E
- Construction started: 1860
- Completed: 1862
- Client: P. C. Skovgaard

Design and construction
- Architect: Johan Daniel Herholdt

The P. C. Skovgaard House, located at Rosenvængets Hovedvej 27, is the former home of Danish Golden Age painter P. C. Skovgaard in the Rosenvænget Quarter of Østerbro in Copenhagen, Denmark. The house was completed to a Historicist design by Johan Daniel Herholdt in 1862. After Sjovgaard's death, it served as the home and workplace of his son Joachim Skovgaard. It was listed on the Danish registry of protected buildings and places in 1977.

== History ==
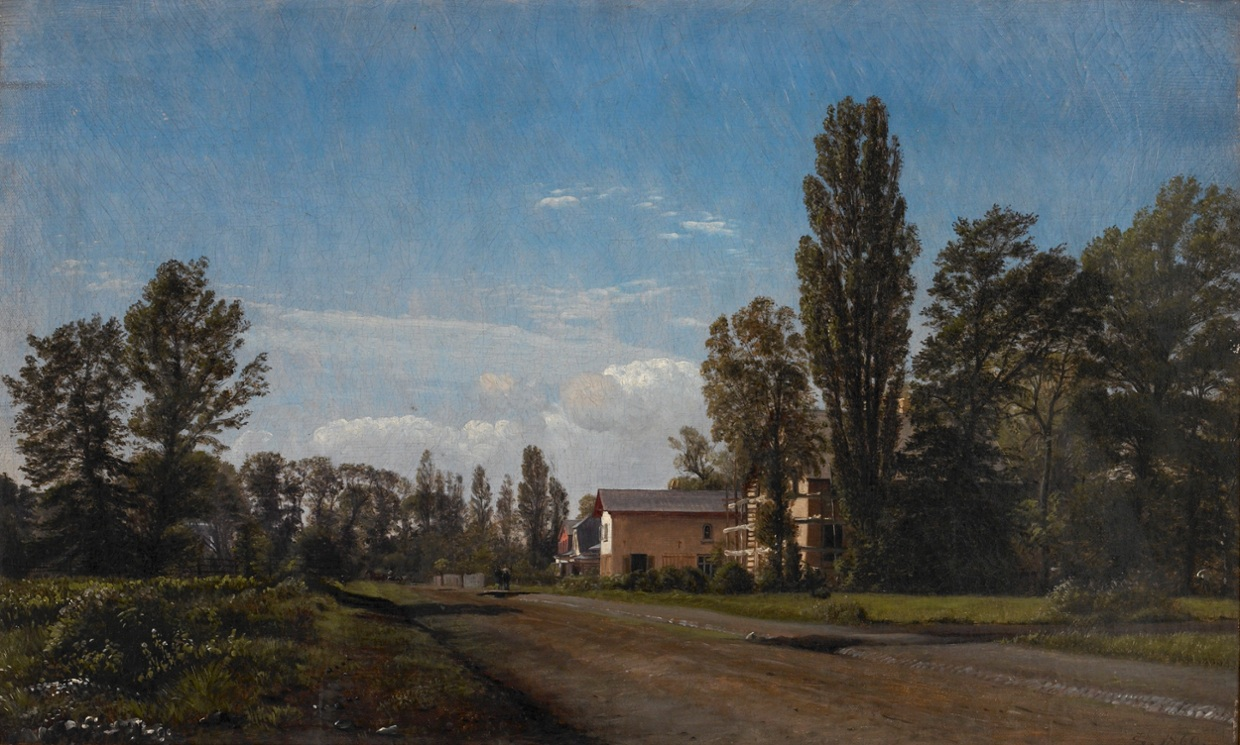
P. C. Skovgaard: The artist's house in Rosenvænget under construction, 1860

Skovgaard purchased one of the first lots when Mozart Waagepetersen started the redevelopment of the Rosendal estate in Østerbro. Skovgaard knew the area well since his uncle, Hans Christian Aggersborg, with whom he had lived when he first moved to Copenhagen to study at the art academy, was the owner of the country house Villa Aggersborg at a nearby site.

Skovgaard, who had that same year become a titular professor at the art academy, in 1860 commissioned the architect Johan Daniel Herholdt to design a house for the site.

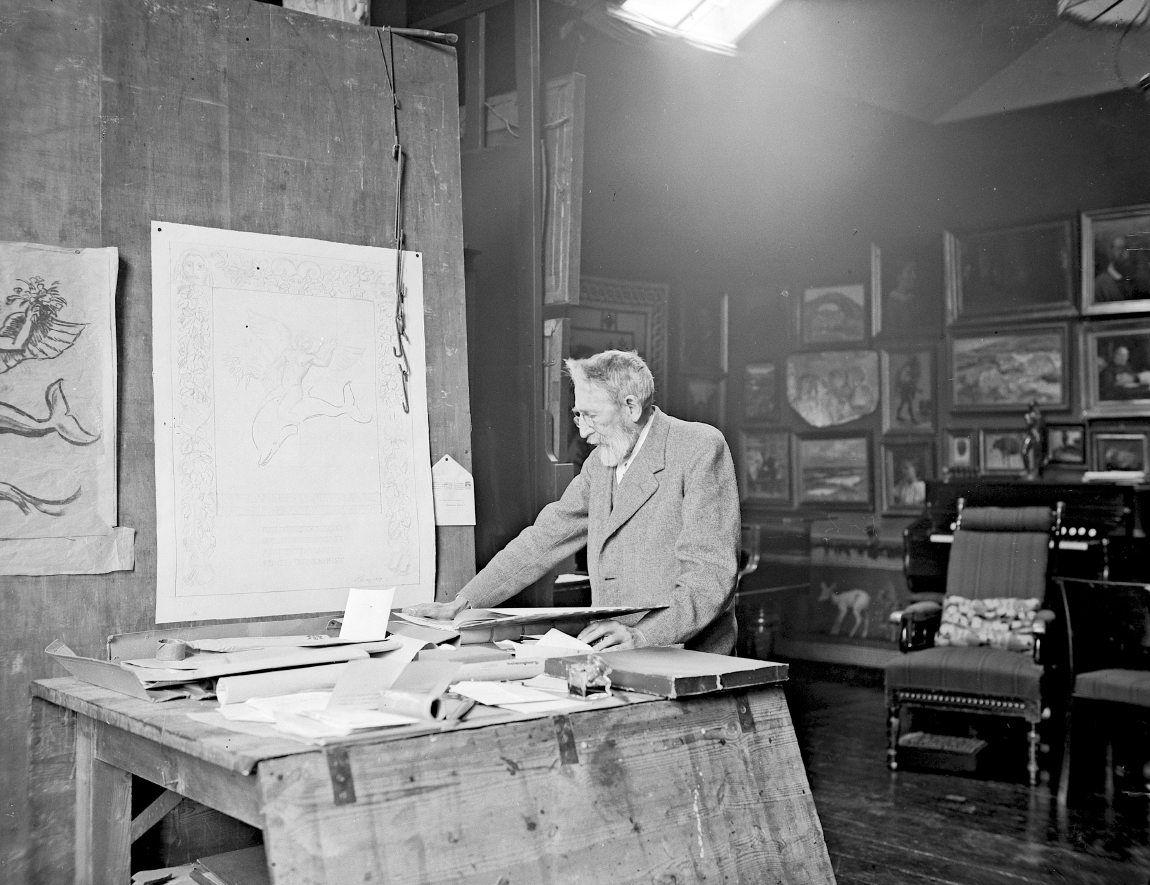
Joakim Skovgaard in his studio, c. 1926

Skovgaard moved into the house with his wifeGeorgia and their two sons Joakim an Niels, on its completion in 1862. The couple was expecting their third child, Suzette, who was born on 29 January the following year. Georgia Skovgaard died in Copenhagen on 15 July 1868 while giving birth to a stillborn daughter.

P. C. Skovgaard lived in the house until his death in 1875. It was then taken over by Joakim Skovgaard. He also had his studio at the site. He lived there until his death in 1933. The house stayed in the Skovgaard family until 1971.

== Architecture ==
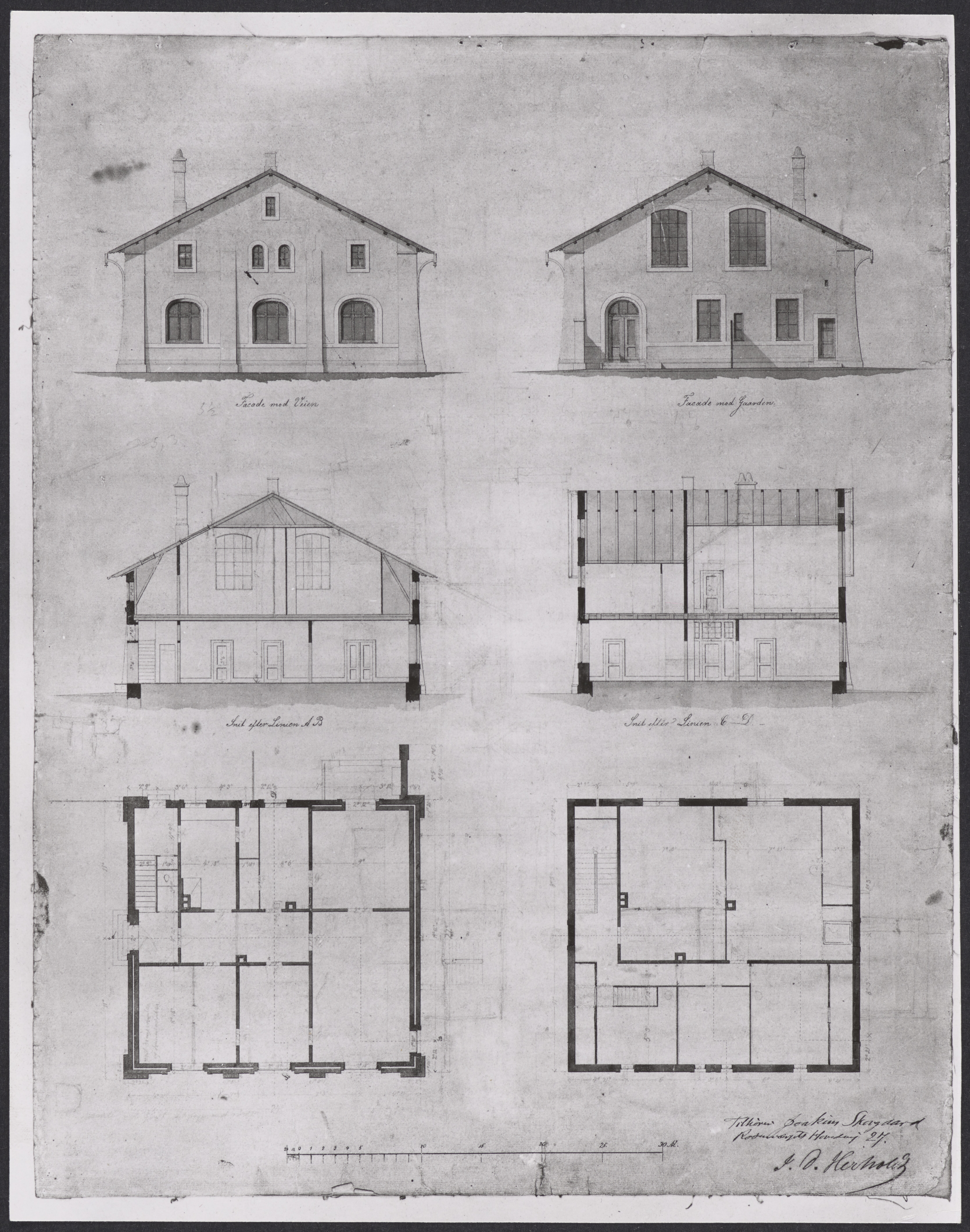
Architectural rendering.

The building was designed more as a practical workshop building for a painter than a home. It is built to a boxy design in yellow brick with ocher-coloured mortar. The walls were originally decorated with corner lesenes, bands and window frames in red earth coloured finishing. The roof is a saddle roof. The windows are symmetrically arranged but of varying shapes and sizes. Doors and windows are painted green.

The interior was originally painted in Pompeian colours with black panels decorated with flowers and animal figures.
