= Irene Skovgaard =

Irene Georgia Skovgaard (2 December 1902 - 12 March 1982) was a Danish writer, composer, and music educator who specialized in recorder music and canons, and belonged to the Skovgaard family of artists.

Skovgaard was one of eight children born to Ingeborg Luplau Møller and the painter Niels Kristian Skovgaard. Her grandfather was Peter Christian Skovgaard, the well-known Danish landscape painter. She studied piano and voice at the Royal Danish Academy of Music, finishing in 1930.

In 1939, Skovgaard and Werner Wolf Glaser opened a School of Music in Lyngbby, Denmark. Skovgaard collaborated with Glaser, as well as with her brother Hjalte Skovgaard, on several publications (see below).

Skovgaard’s works were published by Imudico and Skandinavisk Musikforlag. They include:

== Book ==
- Et Kunstnerhjem : Niels Skovgaards Hjem paa Karlsberg ved Hillerød (An Artist's Home: Niels Skovgaard's Home on Karlsberg near Hillerød)

== Music ==
- 150 Newer Canons
- 150 Older Canons
- Blokflojteskole (Recorder Method)
- Blokfløjteskole : Tillæg (Recorder Method Supplement)
- Fuglene synger : 20 Kanon'er (The Birds Sing: 20 Canons; with Werner Wolf Glaser and Hjalte Skovgaard; text by Irene Skovgaard)
- Tolv Juleviser (Twelve Christmas Poems; collected and translated by Irene Skovgaard edited by Werner Wolf Glaser)
- “Uret Siger Tiketakke” (The Clock Says Tick Tock)
