= Skovgaard Museum =

Coordinates: 56.4504°N 9.4116°E

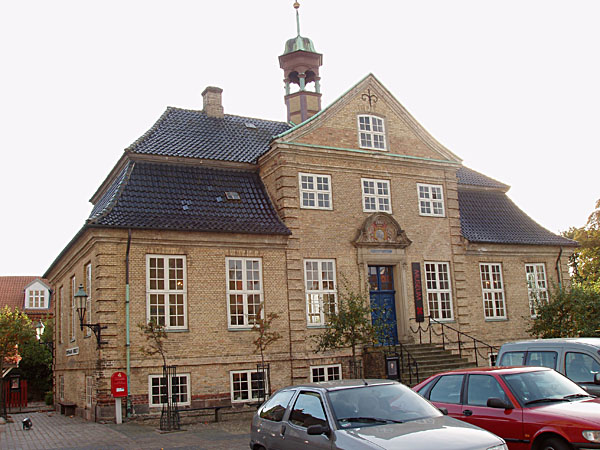
Old Town Hall in Viborg

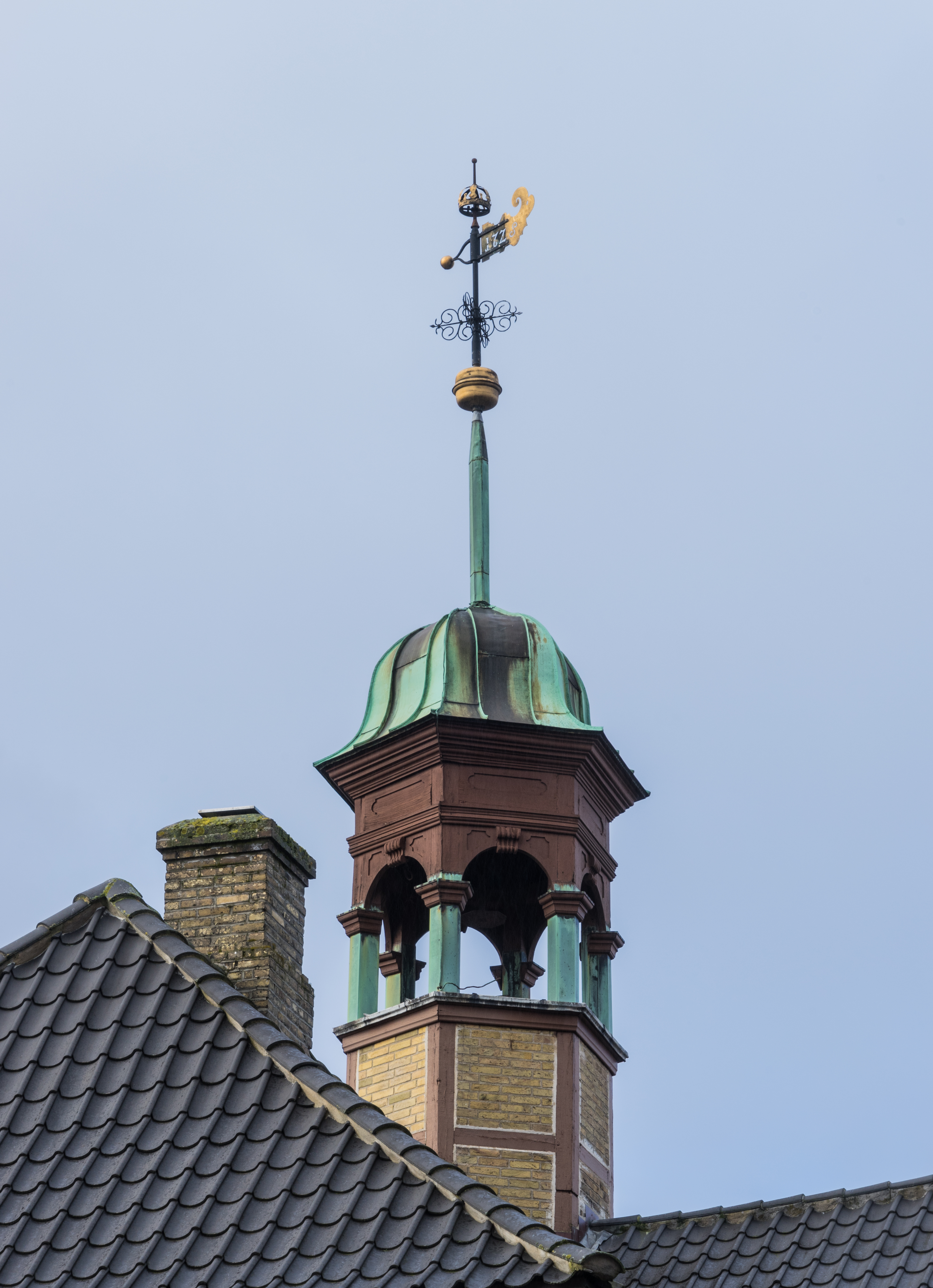
Belfry of the building housing the museum

The Skovgaard Museum is an art museum in Viborg, Denmark. It is situated in the former town hall from 1728 next to Viborg Cathedral and holds a collection of works by four generations of the Skovgaard family of artists.

== The Permanent Collection ==
The main feature of the permanent collection is the work of the members of the Skovgaard family. Peter Christian Skovgaard (1817–1875) was the principal representative of national romantic landscapes of the Golden Age of Danish painting.

P. C. Skovgaard married Georgia Skovgaard (1828-1868). Their sons, Joakim Skovgaard (1856–1933) created the mural decorations in Viborg Cathedral and Niels Skovgaard (1858–1938) also worked with landscape painting. However, their work is characterized rather by Symbolism and burgeoning Modernism. The collection holds exquisite examples of landscape painting as well as religious and mythological subjects.

The circle of artists surrounding the Skovgaard family is also represented in the museum's collections, with works by, among others, renowned Danish artists Niels Larsen Stevns, Viggo Petersen and Thorvald Bindesbøll.

== Exhibitions ==
The Skovgaard Museum shows three to four temporary exhibitions a year, ranging from art from the beginning of the nineteenth century to contemporary art. The permanent collection is on display all year round.

== Other sources ==
- Anne-Mette Villumsen, Camilla Lisby Boesen (2012) Historien om et museum : Skovgaard Museet 1937-2012 (Skovgaard Museet) ISBN 978-87-87191-23-4
