= Classensgade =

Street in Copenhagen, Denmark

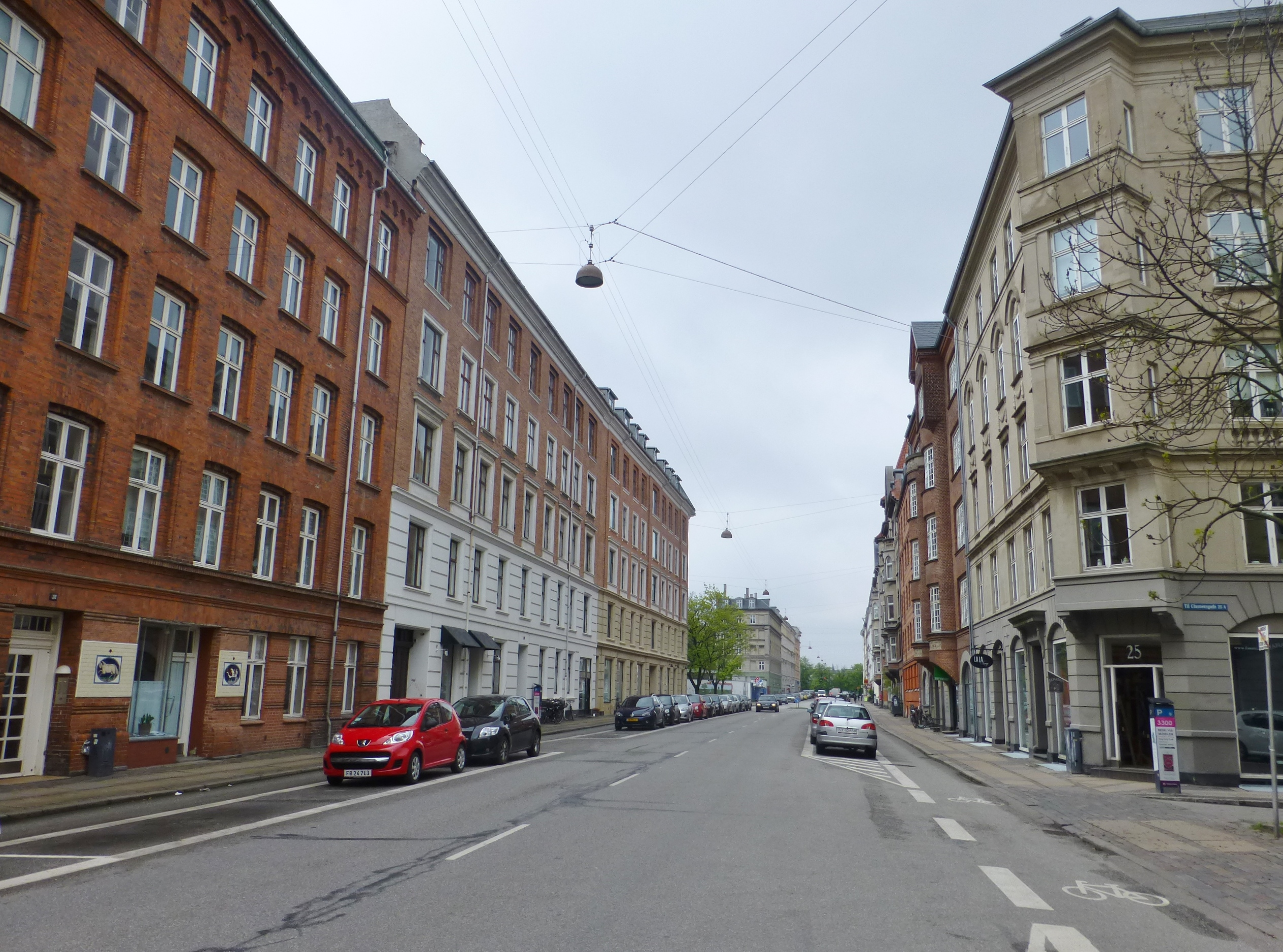
- Length: 800 m (2,600 ft)
- Location: Copenhagen, Denmark
- Quarter: Østerbro
- Postal code: 2100
- Nearest metro station: Østeråprt
- Coordinates: 55°41′50.98″N 12°35′4.98″E
- West end: Østerbrogade
- East end: Strandboulevarden

Classensgade is a street in the Østerbro district of Copenhagen, Denmark. It runs from Østerbrogade in the southwest to Østbanegade in the northeast.

== History ==
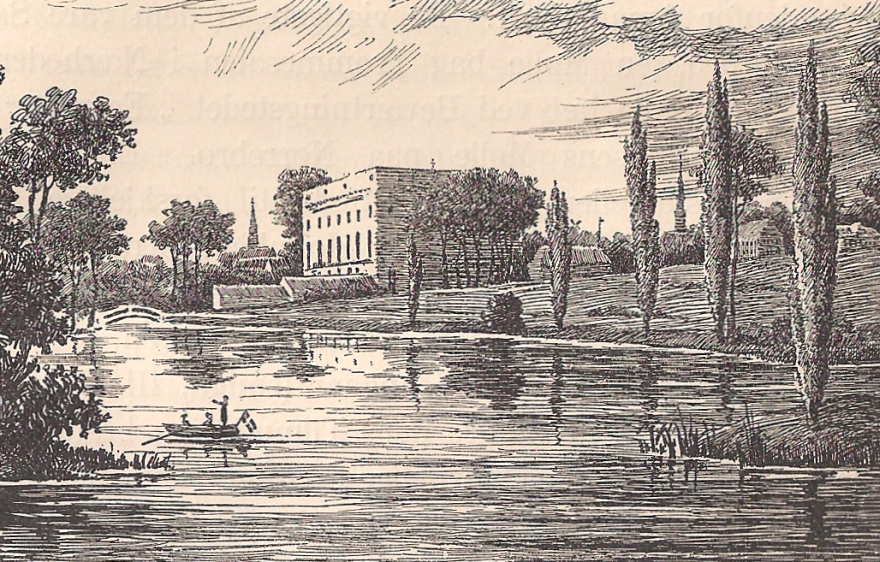
Justinenborg

The street is named after major-general and industrialist Johan Frederik Classen. whose summer retreat, Classens Have ("Classen's Garden") was located in the area. It had a vast garden as indicated by the name. Having no children, Classen endowed his estate to a foundation, Det Classenske Fideicommis.

Classensgade originates in the access road to a property, Justineborg, which was named after Classen's sister-in_law. The street was officially named Classensvej ("Classen's Road#) in 1860. The short section from Lille Triangle to Kastelsvej was then part of Kastelsvej. In 1889, Classensvej and the first short section of Kastelsvej were renamed Classensgade.

== Notable buildings ==
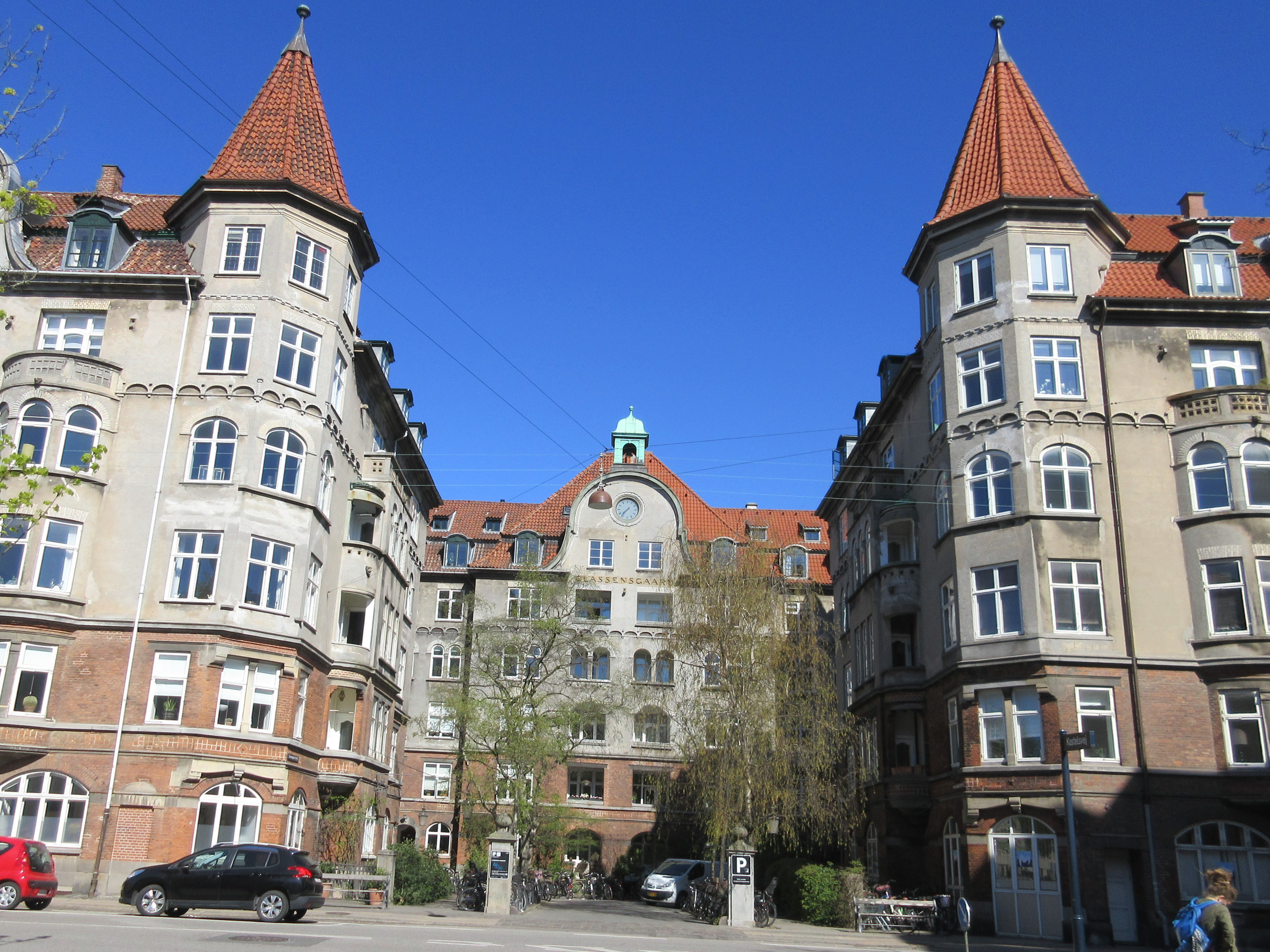
Np. 17-19: Classensgaard

One of the only surviving country houses in Østerbro, Øbrogård or Vennero, is located in the courtyard of No. 11. It dates from the 19th century.

Classensgård (Np. 17–19), located opposite Kastelsvej, is a high-end apartment building. The facade surrounds a small cul-de-sac, a solution chosen to make the most of the site without employment of the traditional courtyard buildings. The building features two corner towers and a small bell tower as well as a clock gface at the bottom of the cul-de-sac. The building is from 1909.

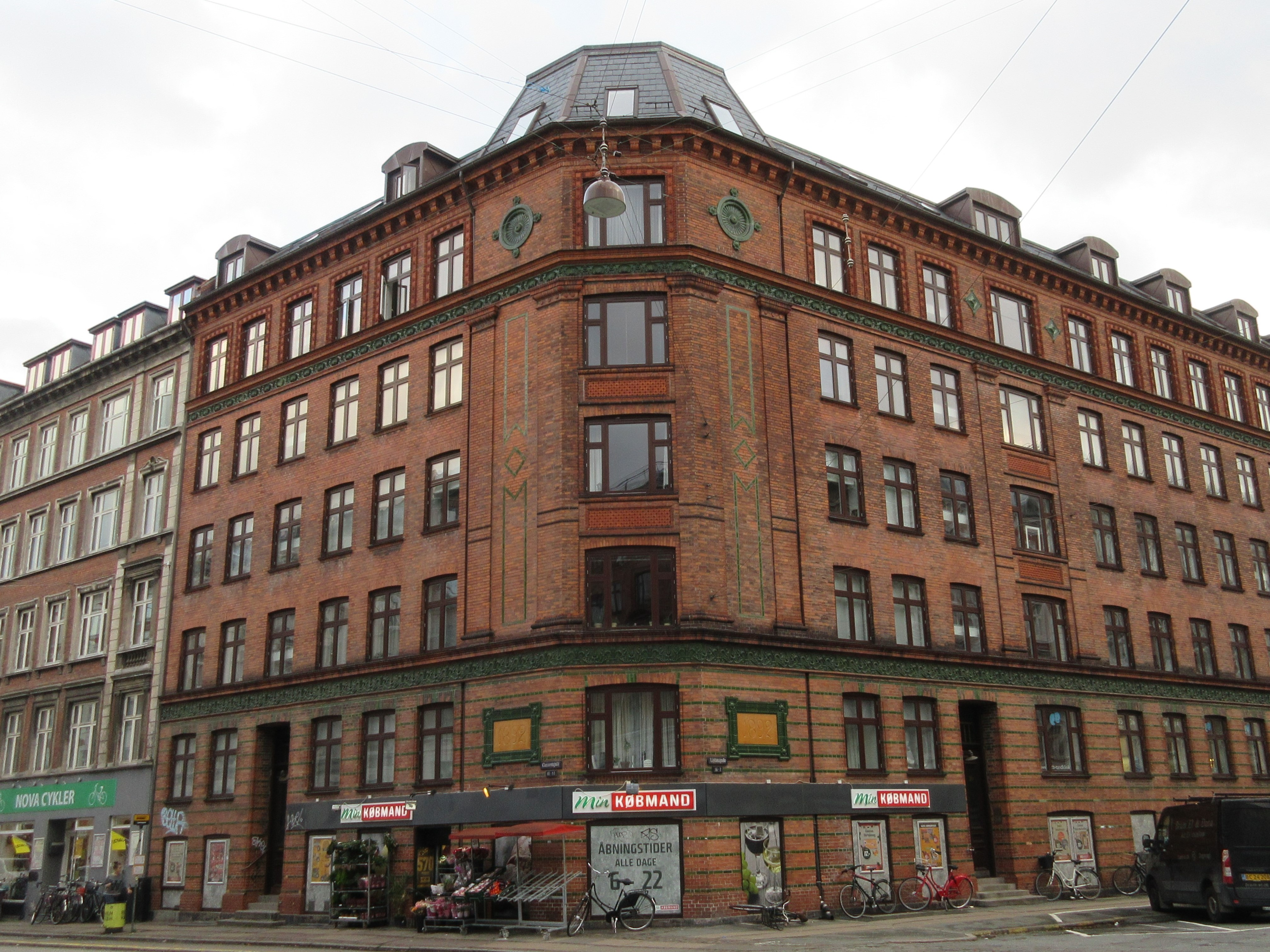
No. 44: Høkerforeningens Stiftelse

Høkerforeningens Stiftelse (No. 44) is from 1862. Classens Have (No. 52-68) is a large Neoclassical apartment complex from 1922 to 1924 designed by Povl Baumann, Peter Nielsen and Ole Falkentorp based on a project by Hans Koch og Carl Petersen. The perimeter block surrounds a large garden complex.

The Neoclassical property at No. 59-65 was designed by Henning Hansen. No. 70, a building from 1931 designed by Thorkild Henningsen, is an example of the transition from Neoclassicism to Modernism.

== Public art, monuments and memorials ==
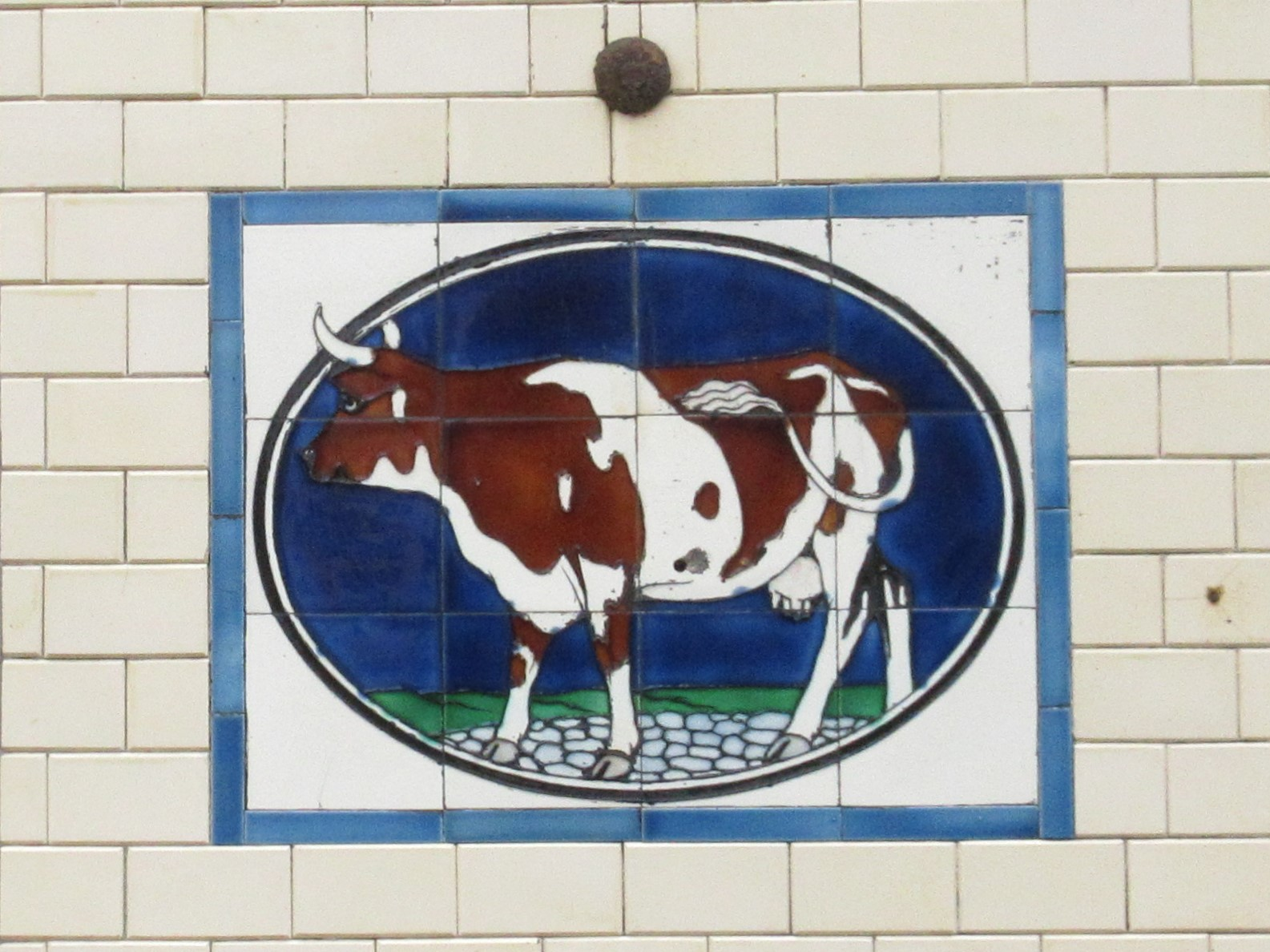
Np. 38: Cow

On a small mound in Classen's Garden stands a memorial to Johan Frederik Classen. The medallion with a portrait relief of Classen was designed by Johannes Wiedewelt.

A marble plaque on No. 40 commemorates that the entertainer Victor Borge was born in the building. The plaque features a portrait of Borge as well as a quote by him, stating that the smile is the shortest distance between two people.

== Transport ==
The nearest station is Østerport, served both by metro, S-trains, regional and intercity trains. Movia bus line 37 runs through the street.

== See also ==
- Aggersborggade
