= Lorenz Frølich =

Danish artist (1820–1908)

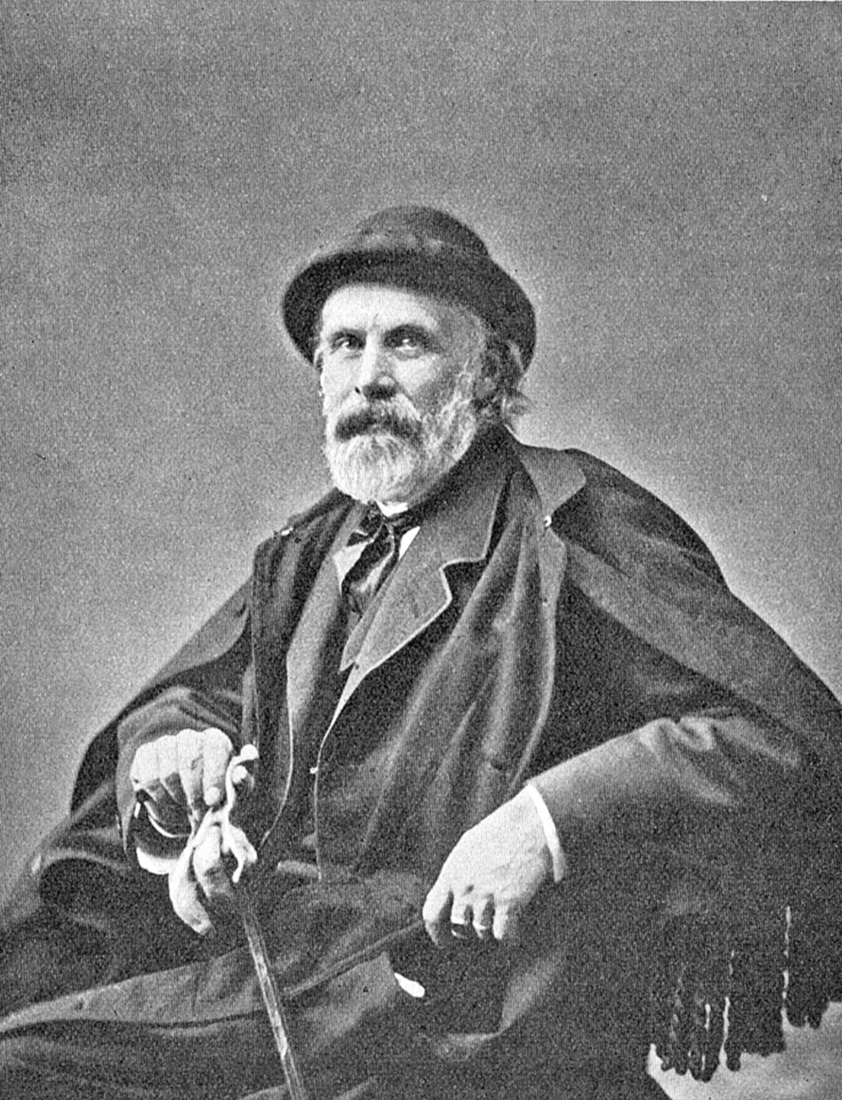
- Born: Lorenz Frølich; 25 October 1820; Copenhagen, Danish Unitary State
- Died: 25 October 1908 (aged 88); Hellerup, Denmark

Lorenz Frølich (25 October 1820 – 25 October 1908) was a Danish painter, illustrator, graphic artist and etcher.

== Early life and education ==
Frølich was born into a wealthy bourgeouis family in Copenhagen. The son of Johan Jacob Frølich (1777–1858) and Pouline Wilhelmine Tutein (1789–1881). His father owned a successful trading firm in partnership with his brother. His mother was the daughter of Friederich Tutein, another wealthy wholesaler and the Prussian consul in Copenhagen. Frølich's father and uncle owned the building at Store Kongensgade 81. He lived with his parents in the apartment on the first floor. The uncle lived with his wife in the ground-floor apartment. The family belonged to the city's German reformed congregation.

Frølich was fond of drawing from an early age. Another early influence was his father's maternal uncle, Johan Conrad Spengler, who in his capacity of inspector of Kunstkammeret was able to give him access to the royal galleries in Christiansborg Palace. He received instructions in drawing from Martinus Rørbye from 1833 and later also from Christen Købke and Christoffer Wilhelm Eckersberg.

He later continued his training abroad, first in Dresden under Eduard Julius Bendemann (1843–1846) and then in Paris under Thomas Couture (1852–1853).

== Career ==
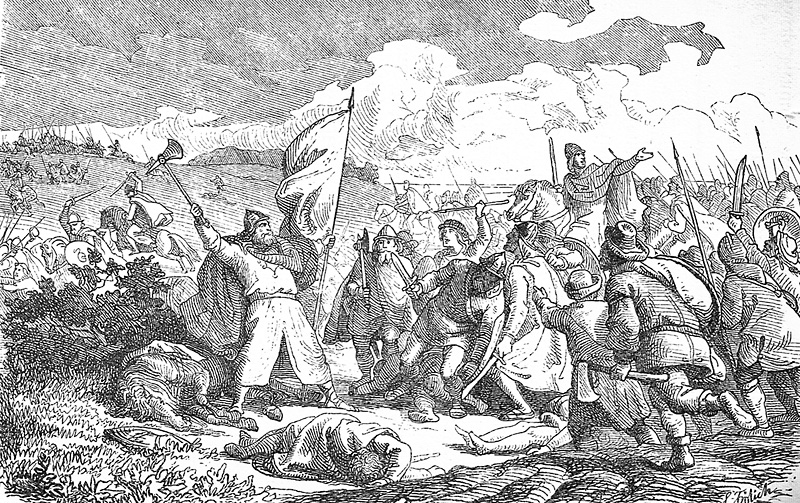
The Battle of Grathe Heath as envisioned by Lorenz Frølich

Afterward he lived much in Rome and in Paris, where he constantly exhibited at the salons. In 1877 he was appointed professor at the Royal Danish Academy of Art, Copenhagen. His illustrations, especially of children's books, are known everywhere and are more important than his paintings. His daughter Edma Frølich was his favorite model when a baby and a child for his French albums with Pierre-Jules Hetzel.

He also furnished original etchings for Illustreret Danmarkshistorie for Folket (1853–1855) by Adam Kristoffer Fabricius; Die Götter des Nordens (1845) and De tvende Kirketaarne (1844) by Adam Gottlob Oehlenschläger, and many other works. He painted a decoration in the Court of Appeals at Flensburg, Schleswig-Holstein, and in some public buildings of his native land.

Danish painter and tapestry artist Dagmar Olrik (1860–1932) and her assistants spent 18 years decorating a room in Copenhagen's City Hall with tapestries based on cartoons of Nordic mythology by Frølich.

== Personal life ==
In 1855, he married Carolina (Lina) Charlotta in de Betou (1823–1872). They were the parents of painter Edma Frølich (1859–1958).

Carl Nielsen composed the Kantate til Lorenz Frølich-Festen (CNW 103) for Frølich's eightieth birthday, celebrated in Koncertpalæet, Copenhagen, on 30 November 1900.

Lorenz Frølich died in 1908 in Hellerup, Denmark.

== Paintings ==
- King Harald Bluetooth (1840)
- Cupid and the Water-Sprite (1845, Leipzig Museum)
- Family of a Wood-God
