= Kastelsvej =

Street in Copenhagen, Denmark

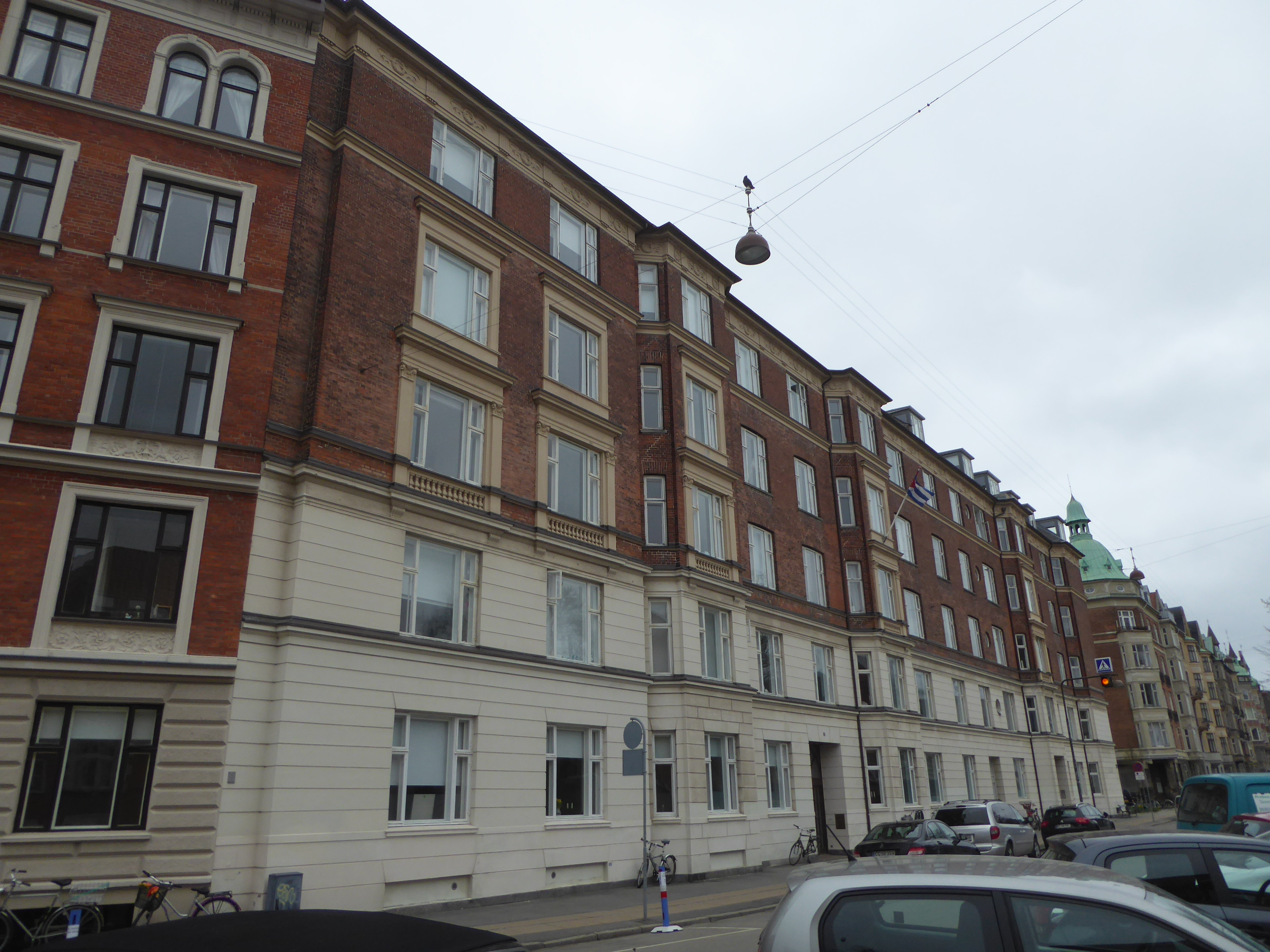
- Length: 2,150 m (7,050 ft)
- Location: Copenhagen, Denmark
- Quarter: Nørrebro
- Postal code: 2100
- Nearest metro station: Østerport
- Coordinates: 55°41′47.33″N 12°33′10.36″E
- West end: Classensgade
- Rast end: Strandboulevarden

Kastelsvej is a street in the Østerbro district of Copenhagen, Denmark. It runs from Classensgade to Strandboulevarden.

== History ==
Kastelsvej was originally called Citadelsvej. It continued to the northern entrance gate to Citadellet Frederikshavn (now Kastellet). A boom house was located approximately where Livjægergade. A fee for using was charged and the provenue went partly to maintenance of the road and partly to the poorly paid servants at Kastellet.

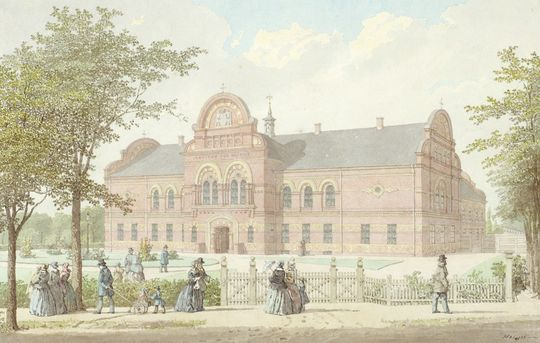
The Institute for the Blind in 1858, watercolour by H.G.F. Holm

The Institute for the Deaf was built on the glacis in front of Kastellet in 1838. The Institute for the Deaf had been built as an arrowhead-shaped revelin which could easily be converted into a defensive structure in the event of a hostile attack. After Copenhagen's fortifications were decommissioned in the 1850s, it was joined by the Royal Institute for the Blind.

A number of large villas were built on the street in the after 1900. They were originally meant to line the fashionable new street Bergensgade but it was never continued beyond Kristianiagade,

== Notable buildings and residents ==
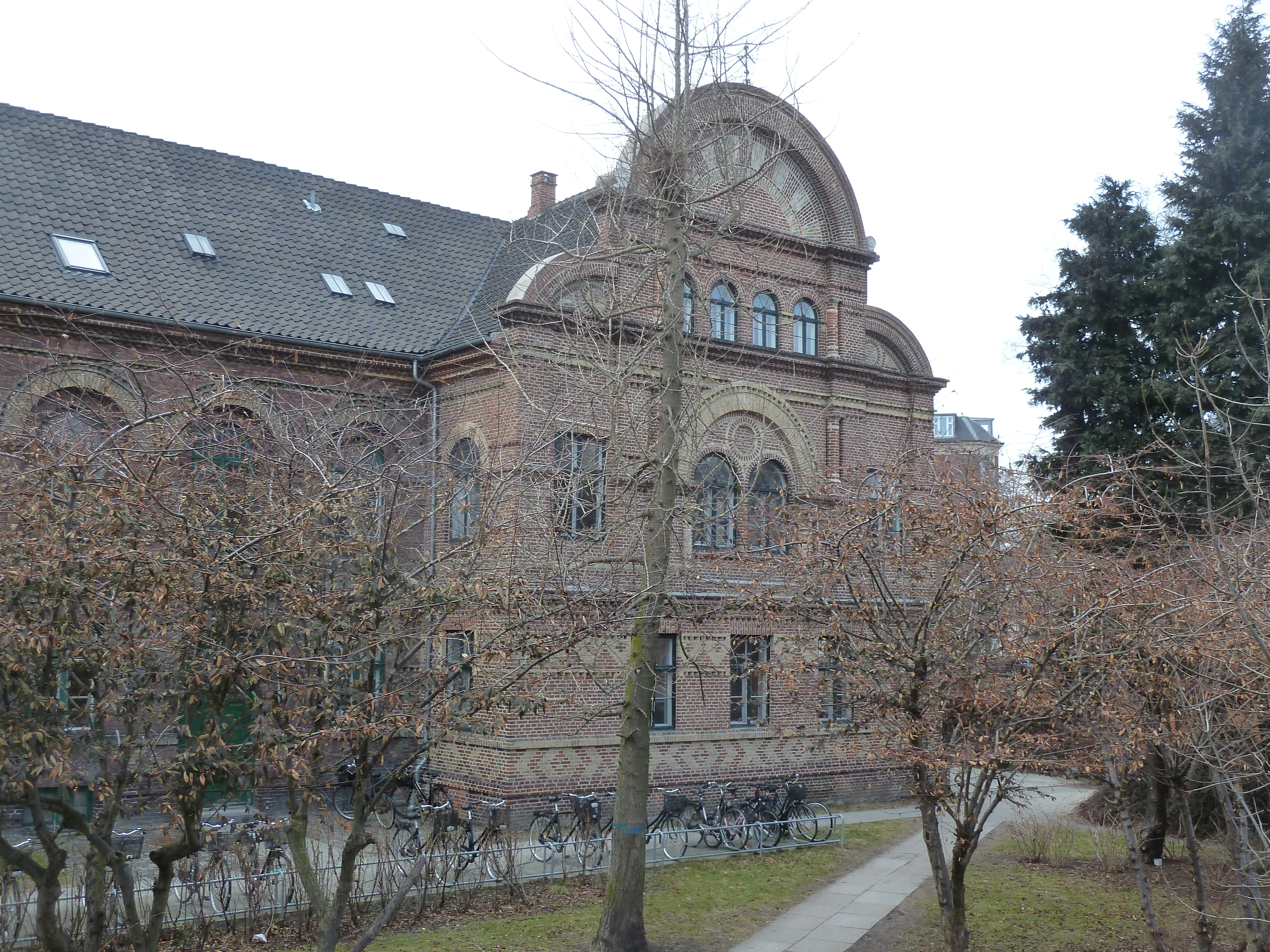
The former Royal Institute for the Blind

The former Institute for the Blind is now home to Copenhagen Municipality's children's centre. The building was constructed in two stages in 1857 and 1880 to designs by Ferdinand Meldahl.

The Museum Building (No. 19) was built in 1920 for shipping mogul Johan Hansen's extensive art collection. The Neoclassical building was designed by Einar Madvig and Poul Methling. It is now home to a commercial art gallery. It is flanked by two higher apartment buildings. The three-winged Kastelshaven (No. 8-16) is from 1928 and was designed by Peter Nielsen and Ivar Bentsen. The L-shaped Kastelsvænget (20–30) is from 1938.

Many of the old villas from the 1900s have been converted into embassies. The house at No. 32 is now home to the Spanish Embassy. The three houses at No. 36-40 are now home to the British Embassy.

== Public art ==
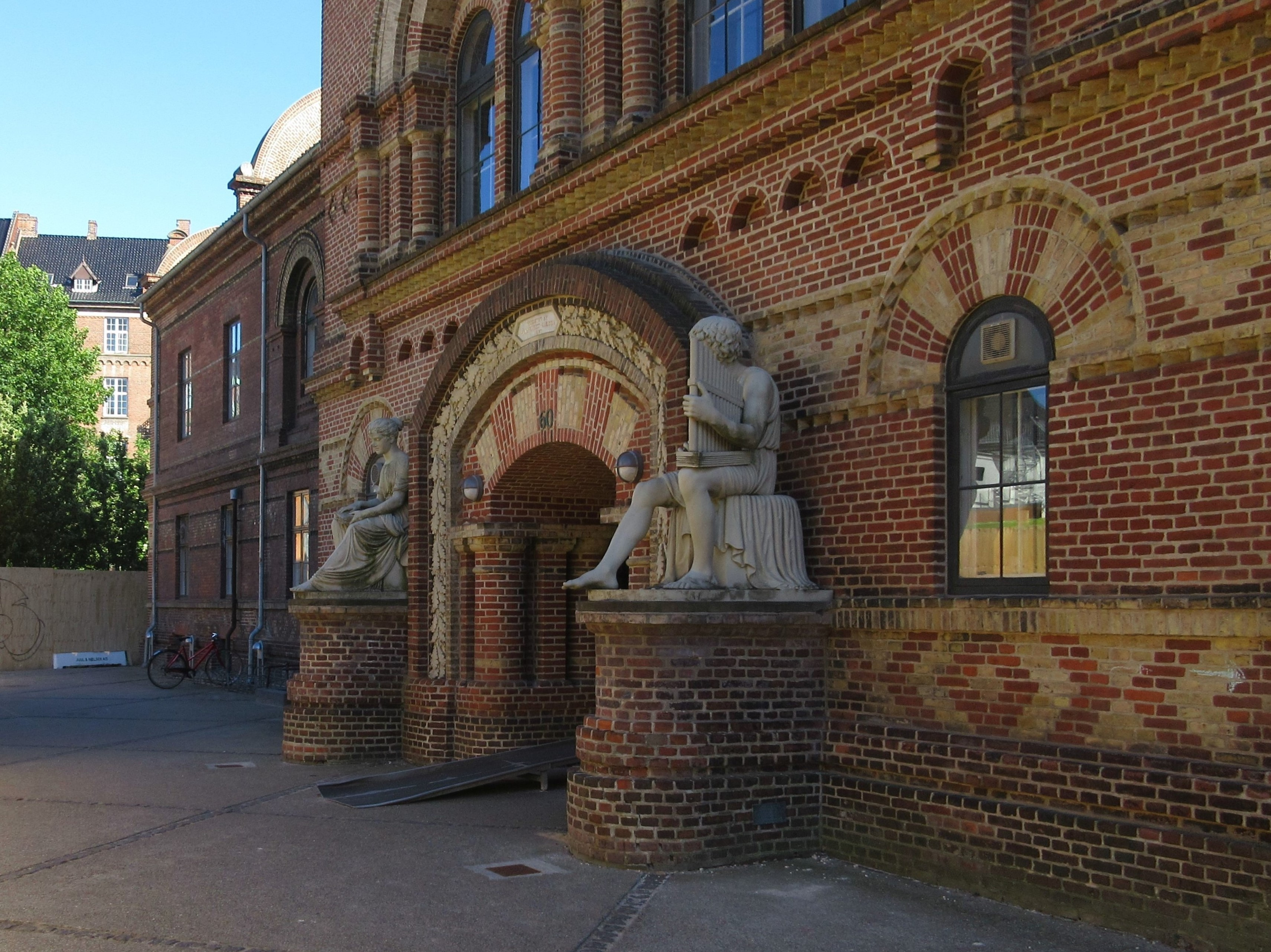
The two zinc sculptures flanking the main entrance to the former Royal Institute for the Blind

In front of the former Royal Institute for the Deaf stands a bust of Peter Atke Castberg who instigated the teaching of deaf children in Denmark in 1807. The bust was created by Viggo Chr. Hansen in 1922. The main entrance to the former Institute for the Blind is flanked by two zinc sculpture, depicting a blind boy and a blind girl.

== Transport ==
The nearest railway and metro station is Østerport.

== See also ==
- Johan Hansen (1838–1913)
