= Edma Frølich =

Danish painter

Edma Cornelia Vilhelmine Frølich Stage, also Edma Stage, (14 August 1859 – 3 November 1958) was a French-born, Danish painter who worked mainly in pastels.

== Biography ==
Born in Fontainebleau, France, and brought up in Paris, Frølich was the daughter of the Danish painter Lorenz Frølich (1820–1908) and the Swedish pianist Carolina Charlotta In de Betou (1823–1872). From an early age, her father used her as a model for his many illustrations in children's books published by the editor and publisher Pierre-Jules Hetzel, especially the Mlle Lili series including La journée de Mlle Lili (1862) and Voyage de découvertes de Mlle Lili (1866).

She was introduced to drawing and painting by her father who continued to advise her until his death in 1908. Her mother died when she was 13 but it was only when she was 16 that she moved to Denmark where she lived in the Copenhagen neighborhood of Rosenvænget at home of the artist Thorald Læssøe (1816–1878), one of her father's best friends. She returned to Paris to continue her studies, first under the traditional historicist Félix-Joseph Barrias (1879–1881) and then as a student of Alfred Stevens (1881–83) who had been influenced by Japanese art and Impressionism. While in Paris, she became a friend of Sofie Holten, Suzette Skovgaard and Elise Konstantin-Hansen, who were also studying painting there.

In 1885, she married the pastor Nicolai Christian Stage (1860–1938).

== Artistic style ==
Frølich created mainly portraits in pastels but also painted still lifes and floral works in oils. Her portraits tended towards Realism but still reflected the mundane influence of Stevens. She first exhibited at the Charlottenborg Spring Exhibition in 1883 but, despite her rather conservative style, became one of the founders The Free Exhibition (Den Frie Udstilling) in Copenhagen which offered a more open environment than the Academy's traditional approach. She presented her paintings there throughout her life, last exhibiting when in her nineties.
