= Suzette Skovgaard-Holten =

Danish painter (1863–1937)

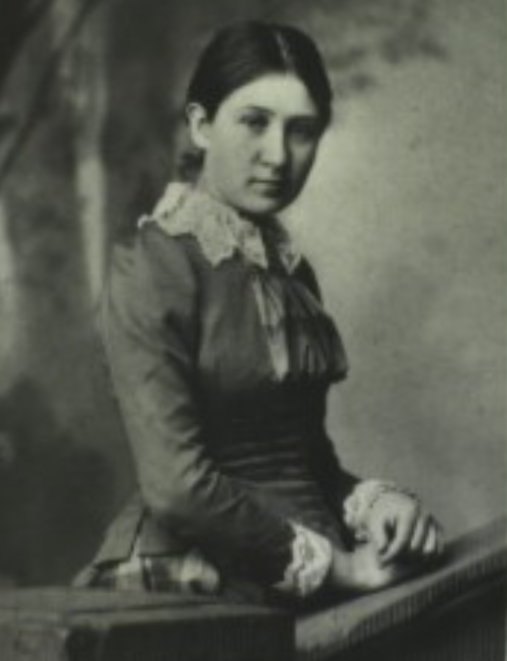
- Born: Suzette Catherine Skovgaard; 1863; Copenhagen
- Died: 1937; Copenhagen
- Occupations: Painter; Ceramist
- Organization: Kunstnernes Frie Studieskoler

Suzette Catherine Skovgaard-Holten born Suzette Catherine Skovgaard, 29 January 1863 – 11 February 1937) was a Danish painter and ceramist who belonged to the Skovgaard family of artists. In addition to landscapes, flower paintings and portraits, she created and decorated ceramics and also worked as an embroiderer.

== Early life and family ==
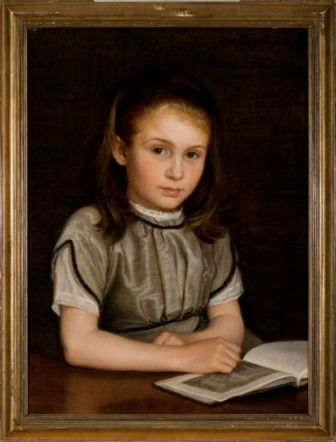
The artist in 1870, painted by her father P. C. Skovgaard

Born in Copenhagen on 29 January 1863, Suzette Catherine was the third child of artist P.C. Skovgaard and embroiderer Georgia Maria Luise Schouw (Schouw-Skovgaard). Like her brothers Joakim and Niels, she became a painter. After her mother died when she was only five years old, Suzette was brought up by her father in the affluent Østerbro district of Copenhagen. He took great care of her, introducing her to the works of the Danish Golden Age painters, thanks to his friendships with Lundbye, Marstrand and Constantin Hansen. He was also the first to encourage her to draw. After he died in 1875, she moved into the home of the painter Thorald Læssøe where she continued to have contacts with the artistic community. In 1894, she married the merchant Hans Nicolai Holten (1871–1937). They had a son Aage Holten (1897–1968).

== Artistic development ==
Suzette studied drawing under Carl Thomsen, Laurits Tuxen and Frans Schwartz but as a painter she was essentially self-taught. She continued her studies in Paris together with her friends Elise Konstantin-Hansen, Edma Frølich and Sofie Holten.

She also established a close friendship with the sculptor Anne Marie Brodersen who later married Carl Nielsen. She became one of the avant-garde artists associated with Kunstnernes Frie Studieskoler which had been established to provide an alternative to the traditional methods of the Royal Danish Academy of Fine Arts. From 1883 and during the 1890s, she worked as a ceramist with artists such as Thorvald Bindesbøll and Theodor Philipsen at Johan Wallmann's pottery in Utterslev and at G. Eifrig's workshop in Valby. Her creations were inspired by classical sculpture and, like those of her friend Konstantin-Hansen, by Japanese art but she also drew on her own imagination. Some of her pieces were exhibited at Copenhagen's Nordic Exhibition of 1888.

Suzette first exhibited at the Charlottenborg Spring Exhibition in 1885 with her pastel work En ung Pige (A Young Girl). In 1891, together with J. F. Willumsen, Vilhelm Hammershøi and Agnes and Harald Slott-Møller, she was a founder of Den Frie Udstilling (The Free Exhibition) which offered an alternative to the academy's exhibitions at Charlottenborg. She played an active part in establishing the institution and frequently exhibited her paintings there. Following her death in 1937, Den Frie Udstilling held a commemorative exhibition of her works.

In 1895, Suzette was the artistic director of the newly established Kvindernes Udstilling (The Women's Exhibition) where she exhibited a number of ceramics and paintings. She designed one of the rooms, installing the green furniture which can now be seen in Michael and Anna Ancher's House in Skagen and which forms part of her painting Interiør med Falk og læsende Dreng i grønne Møbler (1904).

After an extended stay in the United States, Suzette returned to Denmark in 1910 to work with ceramics at the Royal Porcelain Factory (1910–1914) and at Bing & Grøndahl (1915–1918).

== Creative style ==
Suzette painted mainly landscapes but she also created figure paintings, portraits and flower paintings, all with a rather ornamental approach. Her works tended to be more abstract than those of the Golden Age, often displaying a combination of blue and golden tones. She drew inspiration from Art Nouveau and Japanese art. Karl Madsen, who appreciated her painting, commented that there was nothing in her works to indicate they had been created by a woman. She also practised many other art forms including illustration, furniture decoration and embroidery. One of the embroidered altar cloths in Roskilde Cathedral is her work.

== Travels ==
Suzette spent most of her life in Copenhagen. She did however travel quite widely. While a teenager, she visited Germany, Austria, Switzerland, Italy and Paris, and in 1886 she travelled to Egypt. After further stays in Paris, from 1889 to 1893 she spent her summers in Norway. In the 1900s, she went to London and the Netherlands. From 1906 to 1910, with her husband, she lived in San Francisco and Seattle in 1906, returning to Denmark in 1910. Further trips through Europe and north of Norway followed.

== Exhibitions ==
Examples of her work can be seen at the Skovgaard Museum in Viborg. Samples of her ceramic designs are exhibited in the Danish Museum of Art & Design. A major exhibition of her work was held at Viborg Art Museum in 2013.

Suzette died in Copenhagen on 11 February 1937 and is buried in Solbjerg Cemetery.

Teresa Nielsen and Anne-Mette Villumsen published an exhibition catalogue entitled Susette Holten født Skovgaard – Den glemte søster ('Susette Nielsen née Skovgaard – the forgotten sister') in 2013.
