= Georgia Schouw-Skovgaard =

Danish artist (1828–1868)

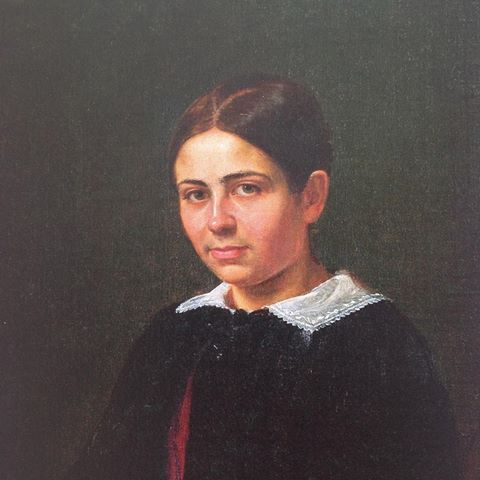
Georgia Skovgaard, painted by her husband P.C. Skovgaard

Georgia Maria Luise Schouw-Skovgaard born Georgia Maria Luise Schouw (1828–1868) was a Danish embroiderer who is remembered above all for works depicting Danish flora, many of which were based on the artwork of her husband, the Golden Age painter P.C. Skovgaard. After her early death, her designs lived on after her student Kristiane Konstantin-Hansen used them to develop her own embroidery business.

== Biography ==
Born on 27 September 1828 in Copenhagen, Georgia Maria Luise was the daughter of the botanist and politician Joakim Frederik Schouw (1789–1852) and his wife Susanne Marie Augustine Peschier Dalgas (1798–1844). Brought up in a lively Grundtvegian home among visitors from the Danish world of culture, she was not given a formal education but acquired skills in drawing, painting and needlework from the artists who were friends of her parents. She perfected her skills after marrying the painter P.C. Skovgaard (1817–75) on 3 September 1851. It was N. F. S. Grundtvig himself who conducted the marriage ceremony at which the bride wore a veil with honeysuckle and wild flowers which she had embroidered herself from a design by Skovgaard.

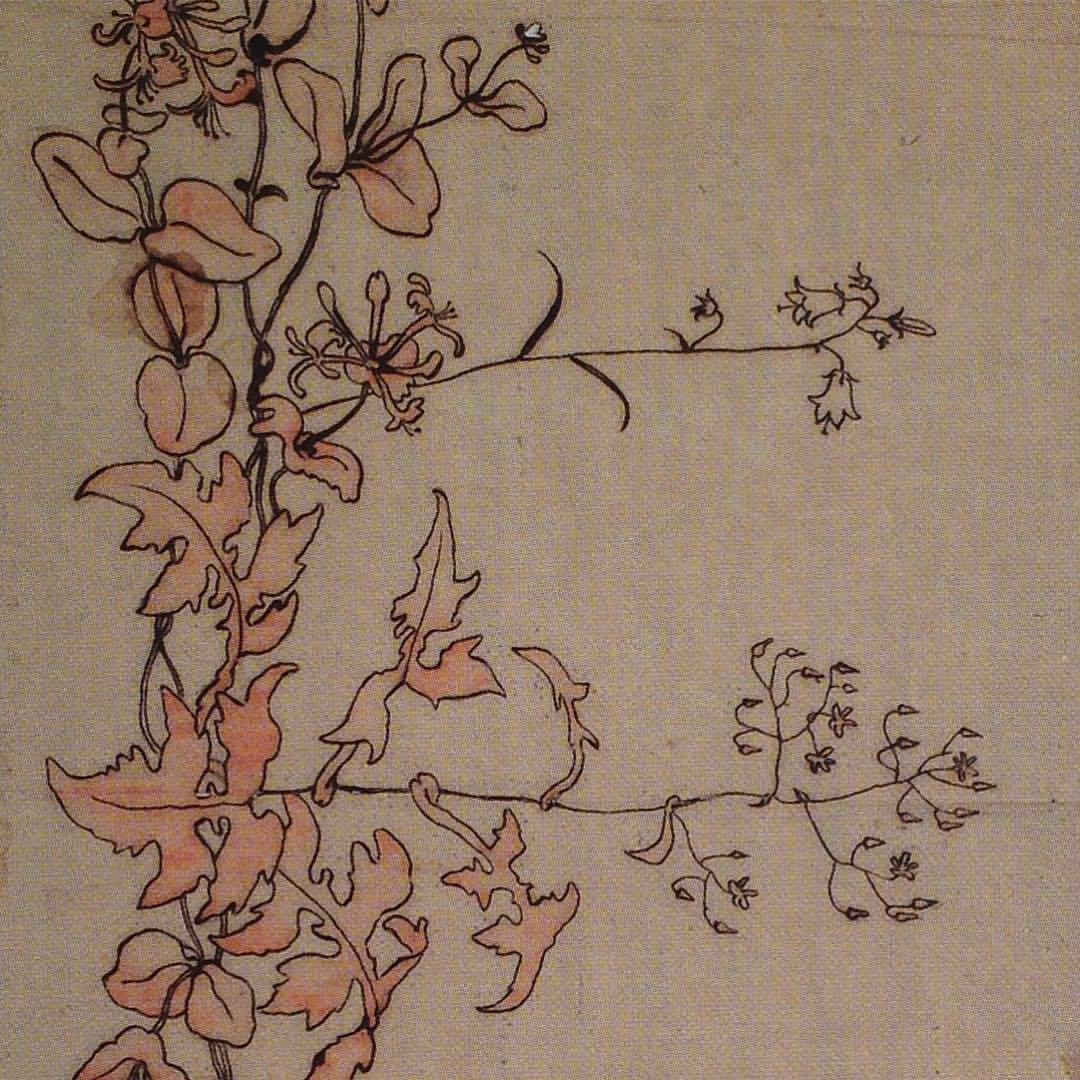
P.C. Skovgaard: Design for Georgia's bridal veil

The couple's artistic collaboration continued through their married life, frequently also inspired by artwork from their artist friends. Georgia sketched both classical monuments and naturalistic subjects while travelling in Italy with her husband in 1854–55. At the 1862 Scandinavian students meeting in Copenhagen, Georgia and her team sewed four banners as gifts for the various student associations. She instructed a number of other women in embroidery, first and foremost Kristiane Konstantin-Hansen who, after working for Skovgaard for a period, went on to open her own embroidery business together with Johanne Bindesbøll. It was Georgia who introduced the embroidery of Danish flora which was further developed at the beginning of the twentieth century by Gerda Bengtsson. Her husband also encouraged her to embroider depictions of animals including swans, dolphins, and deer which were often used in upholstery.

When only 39 years old, Georgia died in Copenhagen on 15 July 1868 while giving birth to a stillborn daughter. She is buried together with her husband in Copenhagen's Assistens Cemetery. Her patterns and designs continued to be used well into the 20th century by the embroiderers Konstantin-Hansen and Bindesbøll.

== Exhibitions ==
While Georgia's works were not exhibited during her lifetime, they featured at the 1895 Copenhagen Women's Exhibition and at the P.C. Skovgaard exhibition at the Kunstforeningen in 1917. More recently, they formed part of the P.C. Skovgaard exhibition at the Skovgaard Museum in Viborg (1967). Georgia was also represented in the embroidery exhibitions at the Danish Museum of Art & Design in 1983 and 1990.

== Family ==
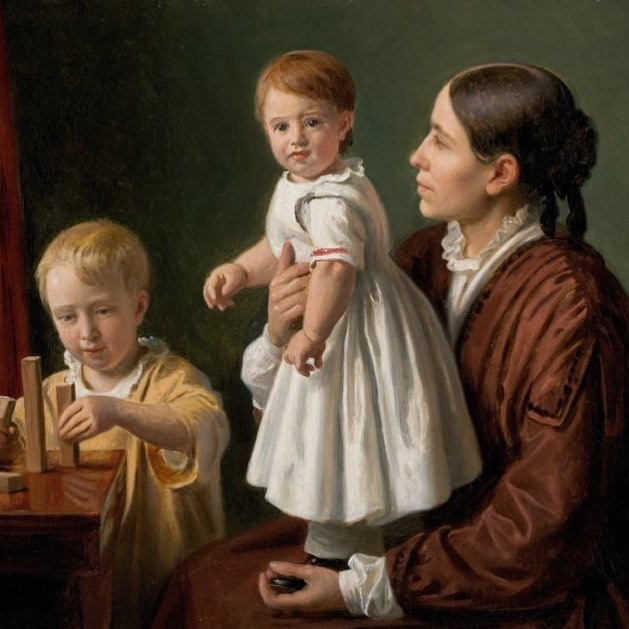
P.C. Skovgaard: Georgia Skovgaard with sons Joakim and Niels

Georgia was the mother of three artists: Joakim Skovgaard (1856–1933), Niels Skovgaard (1858–1938) and Suzette Holten (1863–1937). Today there is a museum dedicated to the Skovgaard family.
