= P. C. Skovgaard =

Danish artist (1817–1875)

P.C. Skovgaard
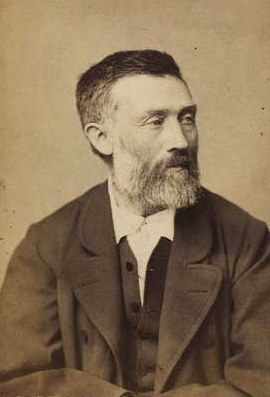
- Skovgaard photographed by Budtz Müller, c. 1870s
- Born: Peter Christian Thamsen Skovgaard; 4 April 1817; Ringsted, Denmark
- Died: 13 April 1875 (aged 58); Copenhagen, Denmark
- Resting place: Assistens Cemetery
- Education: Royal Danish Academy of Fine Arts
- Spouse: Georgia Schouw-Skovgaard (m. 1851; died 1868)
- Children: Joakim Skovgaard; Niels Skovgaard; Susette Holten
- Awards: Thorvaldsen Medal (1845); Order of the Dannebrog (1874)

Peter Christian Thamsen Skovgaard (4 April 1817 – 13 April 1875), known as P. C. Skovgaard, was a Danish national romantic landscape painter. He is considered one of the leading landscape painters of the 19th century and is one of the main figures associated with the Golden Age of Danish Painting. He is especially known for his large scale portrayals of the Danish landscape.

== Early life and education ==
Peter Christian Thamsen Skovgaard was born on 4 April 1817 near Ringsted to farmer Tham Masmann Skovgaard and his wife Cathrine Elisabeth. The family had to leave the farm when he was six years old. They moved to Vejby in north Sjælland where his father earned his living as a grocer.

Already as a young child he impressed his family with his artistic abilities. His mother, who had studied art under flower painter Claudius Ditlev Fritsch, gave him instructions in drawing until he was confirmed and could be sent to Copenhagen for training at the Royal Danish Academy of Art (Det Kongelige Danske Kunstakademi). He was also the man who painted the famous bøgeskov i maj.

=== Training at the Academy ===
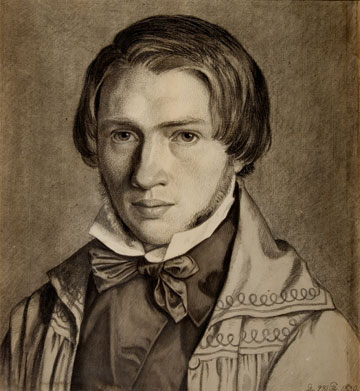
P. C. Skovgaard, Self-portrait, c. 1840

He started his training at the Academy in 1831. He did not think much of this training or of his private lessons starting in 1836 with J. L. Lund, romantic history painter. More advantageous to him, he felt, were the time he spent learning craft painting; the time he spent visiting the Danish Royal Painting Collection, now the National Museum of Art and studying the classical Dutch landscapes in their collection; the outdoors studies he did with friends Christian Gotfred Rump, J. Th. Lundbye, Thorald Læssøe, Dankvart Dreyer and Lorens Frølich; and the many evenings he spent with other young artists at sculptor and Academy professor Herman Ernst Freunds' fashionable house. Christoffer Wilhelm Eckersberg, Academy professor, former Director and long-standing rival of Lund, although not Skovgaard's teacher, played an influential role by encouraging and arranging field studies for Academy students to paint outdoors, including to Jægersborg Dyrehave, an area which Skovgaard featured several times in his mature work.

In 1836 he started at the Academy's School of Model Painting, and exhibited at Charlottenborg for the first time. His painting Måneskinsstykke med Motiv fra Langebro (Moonlight Piece with Motif from Langebro) was purchased by Crown Prince Christian Frederick and is now in the collection of the Copenhagen City Museum.

With the attention and encouragement of such highly regarded contemporaries as Niels Lauritz Høyen, art critic, historian and Academy professor whom he admired, and Christian Jürgensen Thomsen, noted archaeologist and museum administrator, Skovgaard got the nerve to focus his career goals on art, and turn away from craft painting.

== Career ==
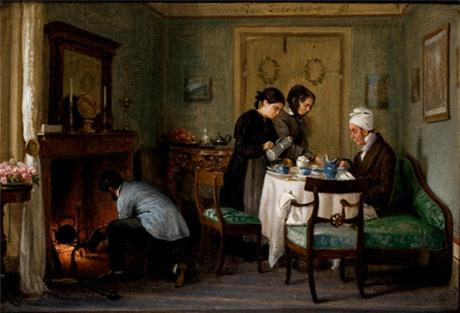
Professor and Mrs. N.L. Høyen with the Skovgaards, 1854

At first Skovgaard painted more than just landscapes; he also painted portraits, interiors with figures, as well as watercolor illustrations of Hans Christian Andersen's adventure tales, that are now in The Royal Engraving Collection (Den kongelige Kobberstiksamling).

But landscape painting took his attention. And with this focus he became recognised for his talents in depicting the nature of Denmark, based on careful study and on artistic and technical skills and training. He painted numerous paintings in and around Vejby, his family's home area, in these early years, and he showed many different influences before developing his own assured style.

In 1837 and 1838 the Copenhagen Art Union (Kunstforening), under the leadership of Høyen, purchased several of his paintings. And in 1839 the Danish Royal Painting Collection (Den kongelige Malerisamling) purchased the large scale Udsigt mod Frederiksværk fra Tisvilde Skov (View to Frederiksværk from Tisvilde Forest). This work distinguishes itself clearly from those landscapes painted by his contemporaries both by the harsh wildness of the subject matter, and by its dark moodiness. This was also atypical of his later work, which was much more peaceful.

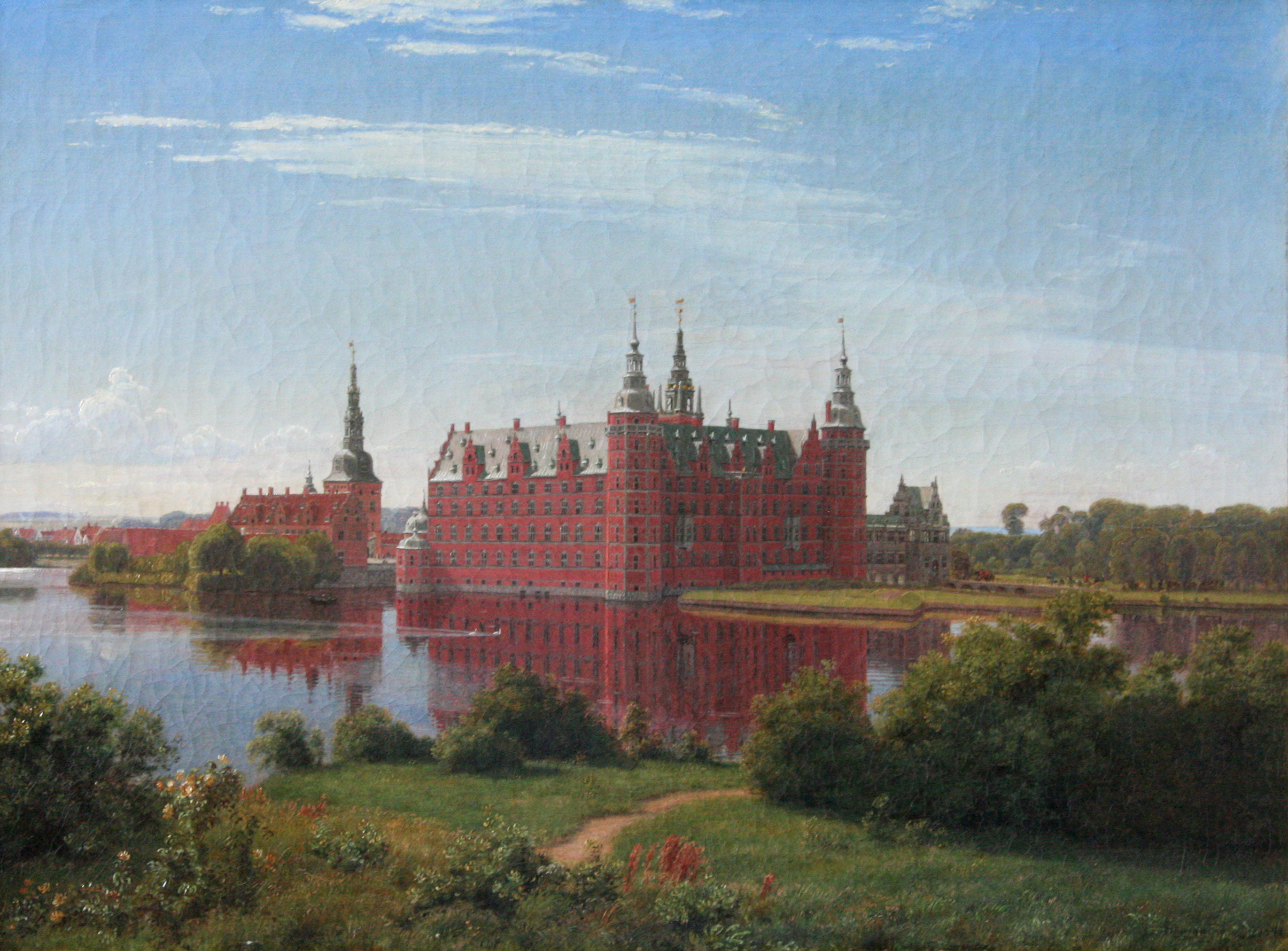
Frederiksborg Palace, 1841

In 1841 he made a painting of Frederiksborg Palace, which hangs there today.

During the 1840s he traveled around the country painting views of the landscape, often with friend and contemporary artist Lundbye. One of the landscapes from his home town I udkanten af landsbyen Vejby, Lundbye sidder ved vejkanten og tegner (On the Outskirts of Vejby Village, Lundbye Sits at the Side of the Road and Draws) painted in 1843 shows Lundbye at work. Lundbye and Skovgaard spent the summer of 1943 together in the area around Vejby. Another well-known work from this same period is Havremark ved Vejby (Oat Field near Vejby).

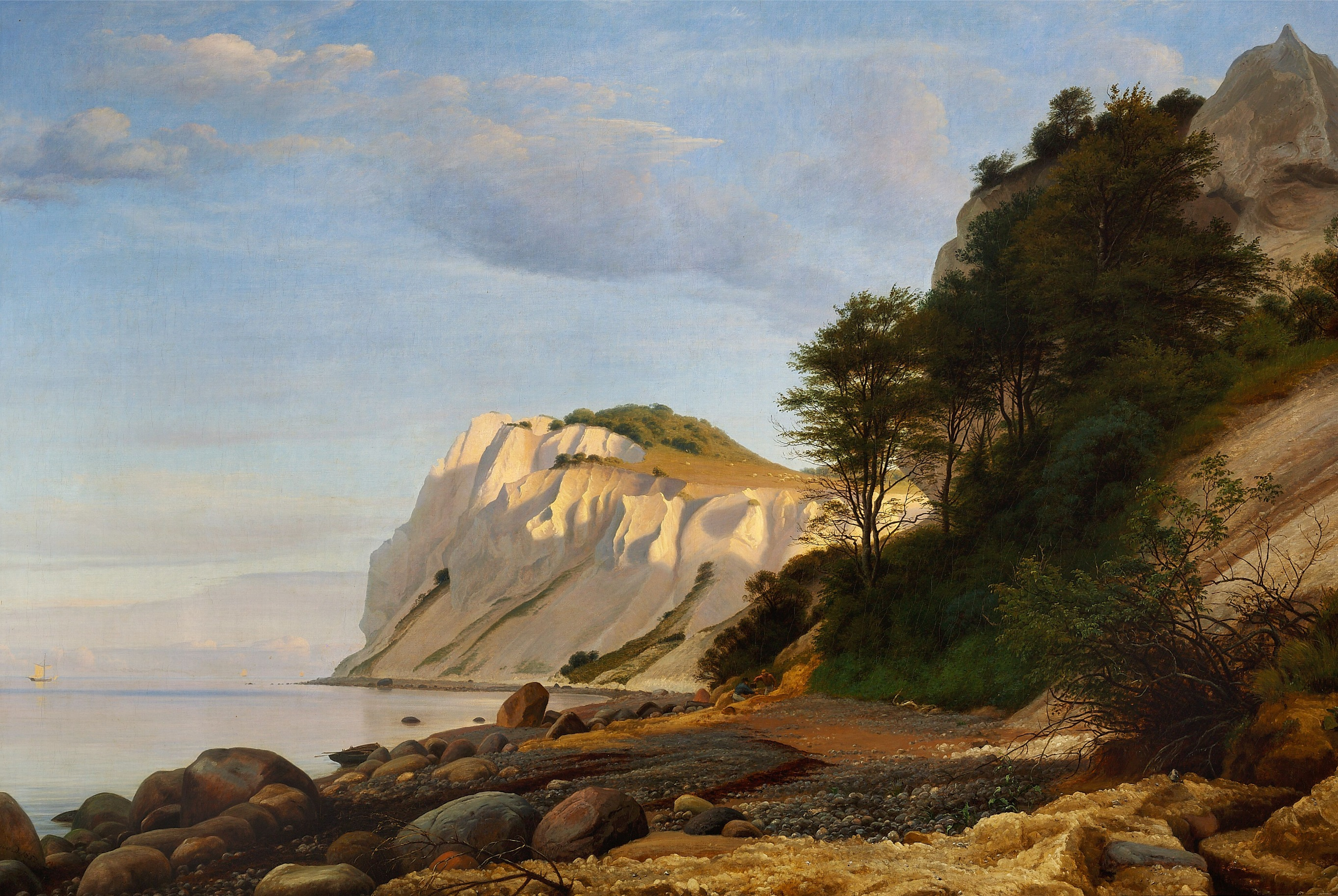
View from Møns Klint, 1852

That same year he traveled to Møn and painted Parti fra Møns Klint (View from Møns Klint), which features the island's unique, monumental white chalk cliffs. He depicted Møns Klint from various angles. The painting is in the collection of local Storstrøms Kunstmuseum (Storstrøms Art Museum).

That same year he exhibited at Charlottenborg and received the established art world's recognition by winning the Neuhausen prize (Neuhausenske Præmie) for the painting Det gamle Egetræ med Storkereden i Nordskoven ved Jægerspris (The Old Oak Tree with Stork Nest in the North Forest near Jægerspris), which also came into the Danish Royal Painting Collection. This painting shows a strong development in his landscape painting abilities. In 1844 he exhibited Parti af Sjællands Kyst ved Dronningemøllen, Foraarsdag med uroligt Vejr (View of Sjælland's Coast by Droningemøllen, Stormy Spring Day) also known as Åens Udløb (The Stream's Outflow), which also came into the royal collection.

In 1845 he won the Artists Exhibition Medallion for his large Udsigt over Skarrit Sø (View Over Lake Skarrit), which came into the National Collection, as the Danish Royal Painting Collection came to be known around this time. He also exhibited Parti ved Udkanten af Tisvilde Skov (View at the Edge of Tisvilde Forest), which was purchased by Høyen's Art Union.

=== Developing his craft ===
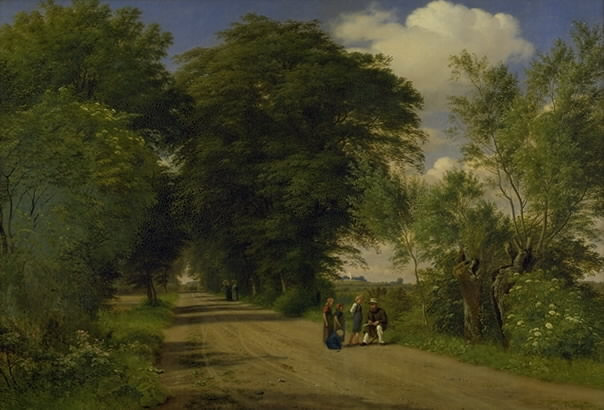
Landevej ved herregården Vognserup, 1849

Instead of seeking a travel stipend from the Academy, Skovgaard chose to follow his friend Høyen's advice and continue to develop his craft in Denmark using Danish landscapes as his subject matter. In the years to follow he traveled around in northern Sjælland every summer to do studies, which he then reworked as large paintings in his studio every winter. These have resulted in such works as Sommermiddag i Dyrehaven (Summer Day in Dyrehaven) painted in 1848, and Landevej ved Herregaarden Vognserup (Country Road near Vognserup Estate) painted in 1849. The latter was painted in memory of his friend Lundbye, who died in early 1848. After 1850 he developed a monumental form of expression that held great importance for the following generation of artists.

He was recognized as Denmark's foremost landscape painter, and received many orders for his works. He particularly enjoyed painting at Jægersborg Dyrehave, but often went further north on Sjælland, for example to Hellebæk where he painted Aften ved Bondedammen (Evening by the Farm Pond).

=== Travel to foreign lands ===
He traveled out of the county with a stipend from the Academy first in 1854. He spent the winter in Italy, along with both his wife, Høyen and Wilhelm Marstrand. He produced several paintings based on this trip, including two views of Venice, a Roman landscape and a portrait of Høyen preparing to meet the Pope.

=== Career development ===
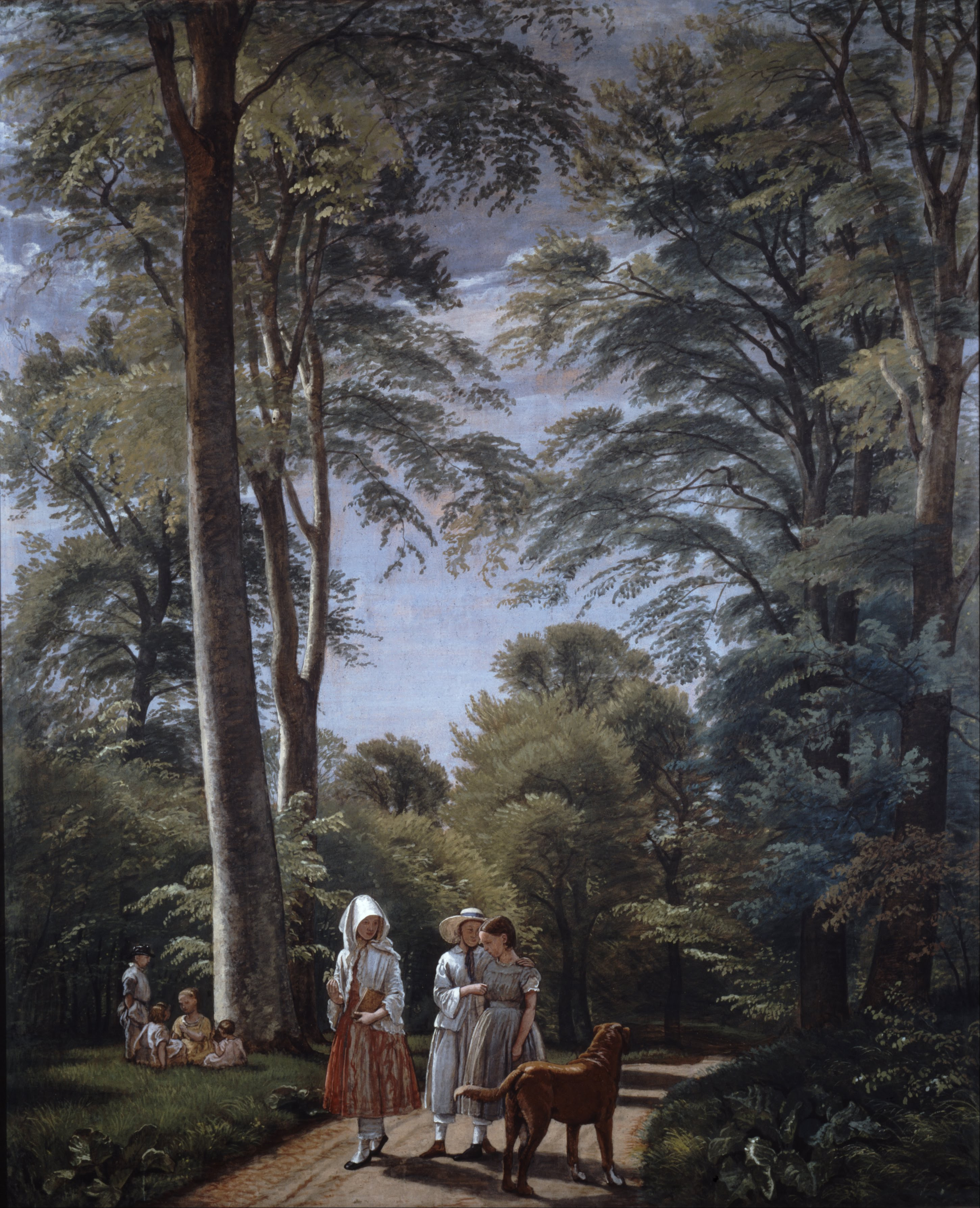
Beech Wood in May, c. 1856

Shortly after his homecoming in 1855 he painted his well-known Bøgeskov i maj (Beech Forest in May) featuring the quintessential Danish beech forest.

In 1860 he became titular professor at the Academy. He traveled to London and Paris in 1862 along with Høyen; his work was exhibited at the World's Exhibition in London that year. He was accepted as member of the Academy in 1864. He traveled again to London and Paris in 1866.

His wife died in 1868, and shortly afterwards he suffered a case of apoplexy. He recovered rather quickly, being able to continue painting soon afterwards with no ill effects.

In 1869 he returned to Italy together with Marstrand under an award from the Ancker Fund (Anckerske Legat), and painted several Italian landscapes. That same year he painted En Skovsø, Sommeraften (A Forest Lake, Summer Evening) and in 1874 En Sommerdag i Dyrehaven; et Tordenvejr er trukket forbi og Solen atter kommen frem (A Summer Day in Dyrehave; a Thunderstorm has Passed and the Sun Comes Out Again), two paintings considered among his most important and harmonious works. The latter was his last large work, and was an important study example of his technique for his students.

He painted portraits of each of his three children between 1871 and 1874. His work was exhibited in the World's Exhibition in Paris in 1878 and 1889, and at the international Art Exhibition in Vienna in 1882.

== Legacy ==
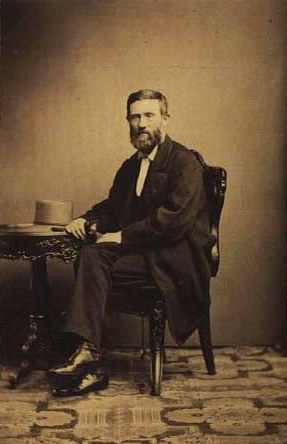
Portrait of P.C. Skovgaard by Thora Hallager, c. 1870s

Skovgaard is primarily known for his landscape paintings, and for the special role he played in portraying Denmark's nature; not the spectacular but the ordinary and typical. He mastered both the smaller formats with realistic, impasto depictions of nature and bigger, monumental and detailed compositions. He helped develop a unique Danish art form and sensibility. He had a deep sympathy for the Danish landscape and its uniqueness, especially Denmark's beloved beech forests. Animal life and locals that belonged to the land populated these landscapes. He studied nature diligently, and tried to portray it faithfully, yet ideally, and with a love of his country. He was a master of composition, and in his later works he developed an increasing interest in portraying atmosphere and light. The scale of his paintings was a breakthrough in Danish art.

He occasionally painted portraits. These skillful works include paintings of his family and children, of fellow artists such as Lundbye (1841), of friends such as Amelie Elisabeth Freunds (1860), H. E. Freunds' wife, and of society's important people such as N.F.S. Grundtvig (1847), whom Skovgaard greatly admired.

His work has been shown both in Denmark and internationally in numerous exhibitions of Danish art, and especially art representative of the Golden Age of Danish Painting. These include exhibitions in London (1907, 1948), Paris (1928, 1984–1985), New York City (1960–1961, 1964), and Rome (1974).

His works are in the collection of many Danish museums including the Danish National Gallery (Statens Museum for Kunst), the Hirschsprung Collection, the Ny Carlsberg Glyptotek, Copenhagen's City Museum, Thorvaldsens Museum, Ordrupgaard, and local art museums in Aarhus, Horsens, and Ribe.

The Skovgaard Museum in Viborg is dedicated to the artistic production of the entire Skovgaard family. A number of paintings by P. C. Skovgaard are in the museum's collection.

Another Danish national romantic landscape painters of his generation, in addition to lifelong friend J.T. Lundbye, was Vilhelm Kyhn.

His art production and academic career had a large influence on landscape painting's future in Denmark.

== Personal life ==
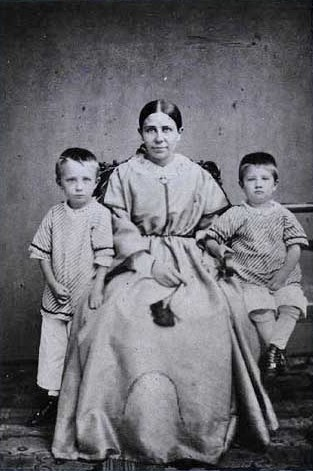
Photo of Georgia Schouw-Skovgaard and their sons Joakim and Niels, c. 1862

P. C. Skovgaard married Georgia Marie Louise Schouw (1828–1868) in 1851. She was the daughter of professor J.F. Schouw, botanist and politician, and was also an artist. She is primarily known for her embroideries, many of which were based on drawings by the leading artists of the day, including Lundbye, Constantin Hansen as well as her husband. They were the parents of Joakim Skovgaard (1856–1933), Niels Skovgaard (1858–1938) and Suzette Holten (1863–1937).

Skovgaard died on 13 April 1875 in Copenhagen at the age of 58. A religious man, he died quickly after suffering another apoplexy attack as he came out of church with his children. He was buried in Assistens Cemetery in Copenhagen. His children would follow in he and his wife's footsteps and become artists.

== See also ==
- Art of Denmark
- List of Danish painters
- Skovgaard Museum
