= Niels Skovgaard =

Danish painter and sculptor (1858–1938)

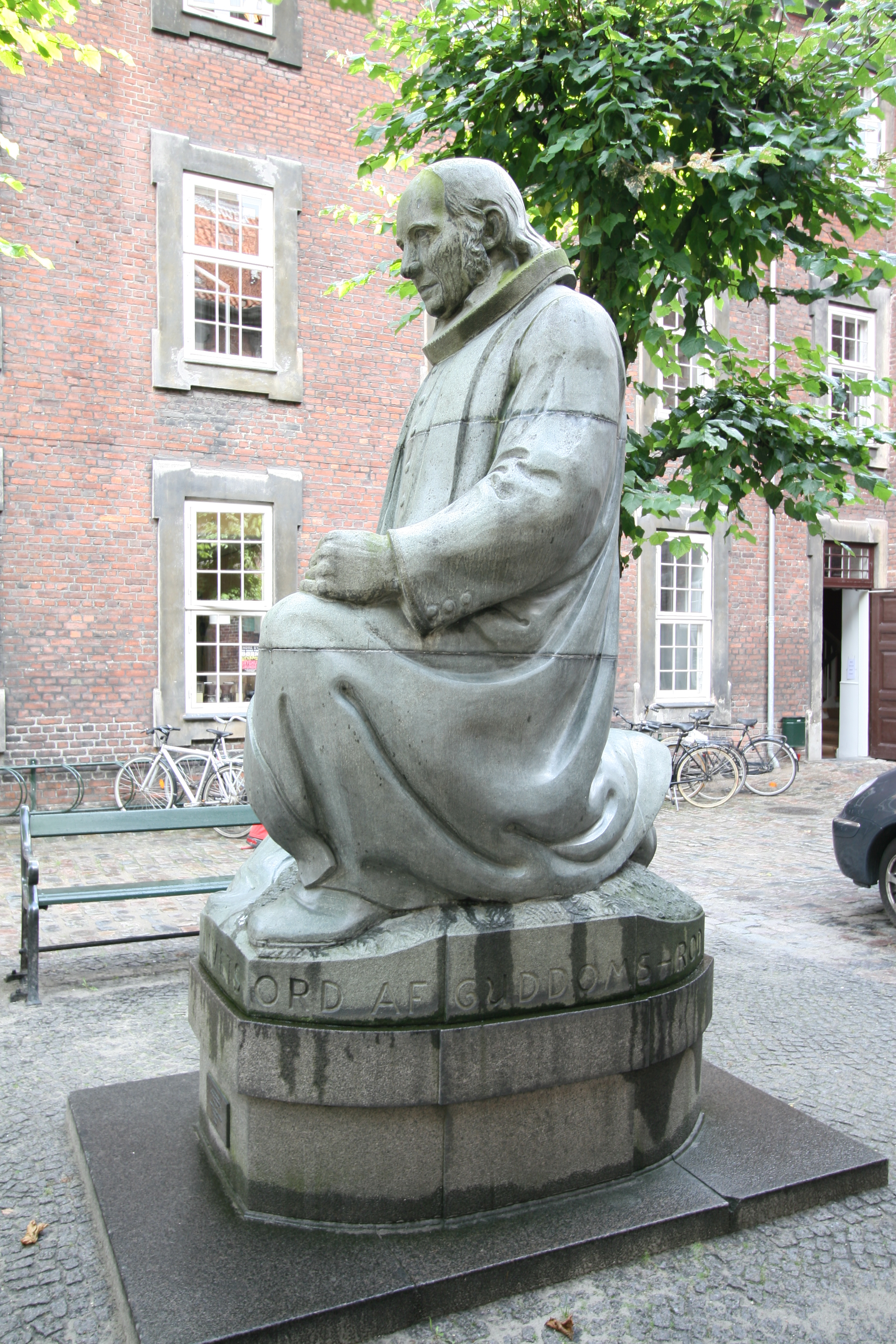
Niels Skovgaard: Statue of Grundtvig, Copenhagen (1931)

Niels Kristian Skovgaard (2 November 1858 – 3 February 1938) was a Danish painter and sculptor. His statue of N.F.S. Grundtvig is considered to be a masterpiece of Danish sculpture.

== Biography ==
Born in Copenhagen, Skovgaard was the son of the notable Danish Golden Age painter P.C. Skovgaard (1817–75). Like his brother Joakim Skovgaard (1856–1933), he was introduced to art by his father who encouraged him to paint in the open air. Artist Janus la Cour (1837–1909) who lived in the Skovgaard home, was also a source of inspiration. He attended the Royal Danish Academy of Fine Arts from 1874 to 1879 but left without receiving a diploma.

Unlike his brother, he was not attracted by the modern painting trends in France despite a visit to Paris in 1883. He was more interested in the styles of painting he experienced in the Netherlands which induced him to paint landscapes on the North Sea coast which showed his mastery of light and air together with a sensitive approach to colour. Nevertheless, he was to some extent influenced by the Barbizon School. His Svære dønninger ved Jyllands vestkyst depicting waves on Jutland's west coast can be considered an example of Symbolism although he generally adopted the Naturalist idiom.

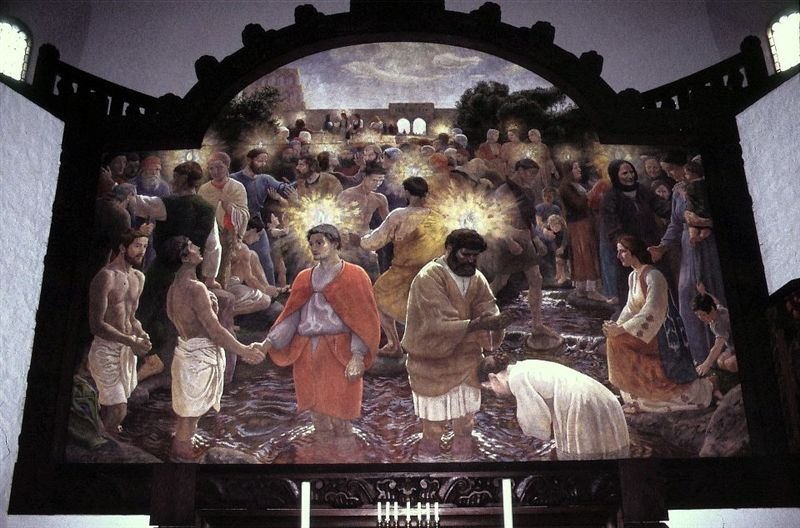
Altarpiece at Immanuel Church, Frederiksberg (1905)

From 1884, together with romantic ornamental artist Thorvald Bindesbøll (1846–1908) and his siblings, he began to design glazed ceramics while he developed his interest in sculpture from 1887 with Aage og Else (1887) and Magnusstenen (1898). He became increasingly interested in classical Greek sculpture, spending years trying to reconstruct the figures from the west pediment of Olympia's Temple of Zeus. He also worked on female figures dancing in Megara as can be seen in his painting Trata - Kvindedansen i Megara (1923) in the Skovgaard Museum. Like his brother Joakim, he also created a number of religious works including the altarpiece Dåben på pinsedag (1905) in the Immanuel Church, Frederiksberg. In 1931, he created the statue of N.F.S. Grundtvig in Vartov, Copenhagen, considered to be a masterpiece of Danish sculpture.

Skovgaard married Ingeborg Luplau Møller and had eight children, including author and composer Irene Skovgaard, who published a book about her father entitled Et Kunstnerhjem : Niels Skovgaards Hjem paa Karlsberg ved Hillerød (An Artist's Home: Niels Skovgaard's Home on Karlsberg near Hillerød). Skovgaard died during 1938 at Kongens Lyngby and was buried at Sorgenfri Cemetery.

== Awards ==
In 1937, Skovgaard was awarded the Thorvaldsen Medal.

== See also ==
- Hippocampus Well
