= Joakim Skovgaard =

Danish painter (1856-1933)

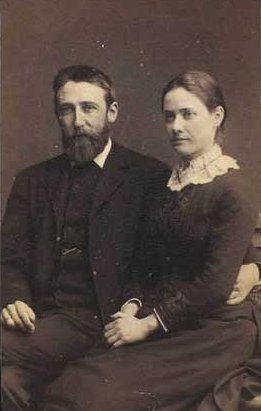
Joakim Skovgaard and his wife, Agnete, the daughter of Johan Lange (c.1890)

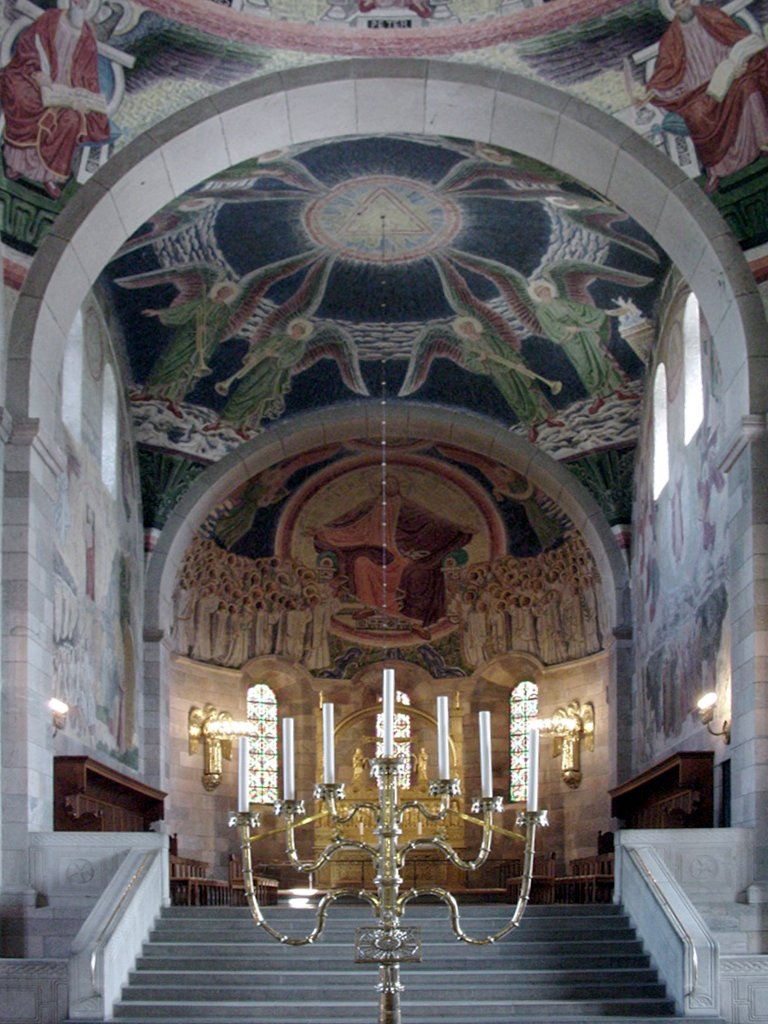
Skovgaard's frescos in Viborg Cathedral

Joakim Frederik Skovgaard (18 November 1856 – 9 March 1933) was a Danish painter. He is notable for working in the medium of buon fresco, examples of which decorate Viborg Cathedral.

== Biography ==
Born in Copenhagen, from an early age he was trained in drawing and painting by his father P.C. Skovgaard in the Danish Golden Age tradition and had close contacts with N.F.S. Grundtvig. He studied at the Royal Danish Academy of Fine Arts from 1871 to 1876 and attended Léon Bonnat's school in Paris in the winter of 1880-81 where he was influenced by the trend towards Realism. In the 1880s, he travelled to Italy and to Greece, where he was accompanied by Kristian Zahrtmann, developing an interest in Symbolism. In Rome, he was influenced by the Impressionist approach to painting taken by Theodor Philipsen.

In 1891, Skovgaard was a co-founder of Den Frie Udstilling where he subsequently exhibited. From 1884, he experimented with decorating ceramics as can be seen in his dish Eva med slangen (Eve with the Snake). He designed ceramics for J. Wallmann in Utterslev where he became acquainted with Thorvald Bindesbøll. Often depicting animals, his designs later led to sculptures completed together with Bindesbøll, including Dragespringvandet (1888-1923) and Bjørnespringvandet (1888-1901) at Copenhagen City Hall.

From 1885, Skovgaard developed religious motifs in his paintings, as in Kristus fører Røveren ind i Paradis (1890) and Kristus i Dødsriget (1894). His frescos in Viborg Cathedral took him five years to complete (1901–06), even though he had several assistants. In the medieval tradition, the frescos represent the principal Bible stories from the Old and New Testaments. He later redecorated the church ceiling (1912–13). The frescos in Viborg Cathedral are considered to be one of Denmark's major works of art.

== Awards ==
In 1923, Joakim Skovgaard was awarded the Thorvaldsen Medal.
