= Slott-Møller =

Slott-Møller is a surname. Notable people with the surname include:

- Agnes Slott-Møller (1862–1937), Danish Symbolist painter
- Harald Slott-Møller (1864–1937), Danish painter and ceramist
