= Den Frie Udstilling =

Danish artists' association

Coordinates: 55°41′29″N 12°35′13″E

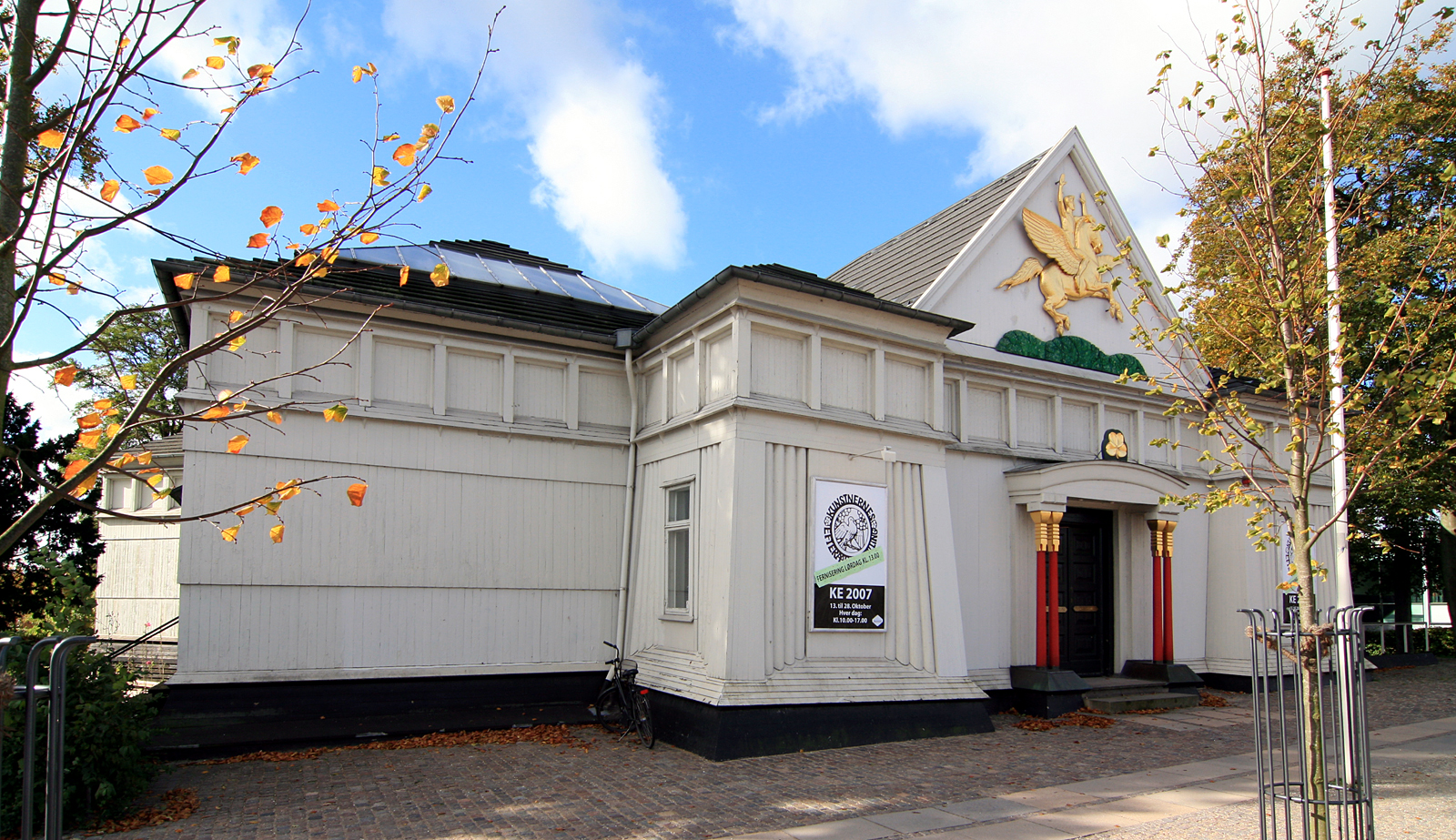
Den Frie Udstilling

Den Frie Udstilling (transl. The Free Exhibition) is a Danish artists' association, founded in 1891 by artists in protest against the admission requirements for the Kunsthal Charlottenborg. Modeled on the Salon des Refusés, it is Denmark's oldest association of artists. Now located on Copenhagen's Oslo Plads next to Østerport Station, it works as an arts centre, continuing to exhibit works created and selected by contemporary artists rather than those chosen by cultural authorities.

== History ==
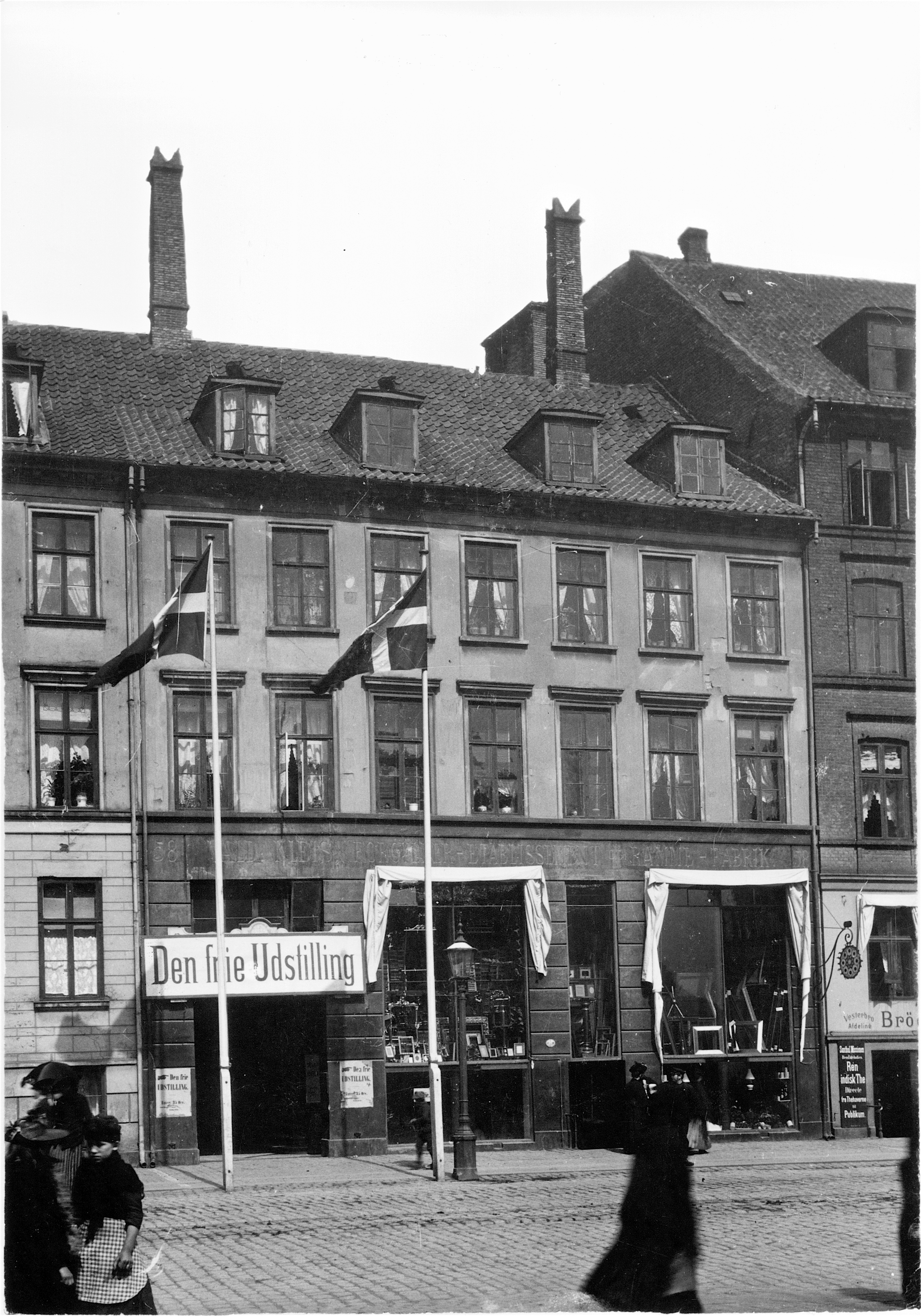
Kleis' Kunsthandel on the opening day of Den Frie Udstilling, 26 March 1891.

The organization was initiated by the painter Johan Rohde (1856–1935) and included several founding members: Jens Ferdinand Willumsen, Anne Marie Carl-Nielsen, Vilhelm Hammershøi, Johanne Cathrine Krebs, the couple Harald and Agnes Slott-Møller, Christian Mourier-Petersen and Malthe Engelsted.

The first exhibition in 1891 presented 100 works by 18 artists, including Peder Severin Krøyer, Julius Paulsen and Kristian Zahrtmann, who were among Denmark's greatest painters of the period. The first exhibition was hosted by Kleis' Kunsthandel, a combined art gallery and gilder's business situated at Vesterbrogade 58 in Vesterbro. It opened on 27 March 1891.

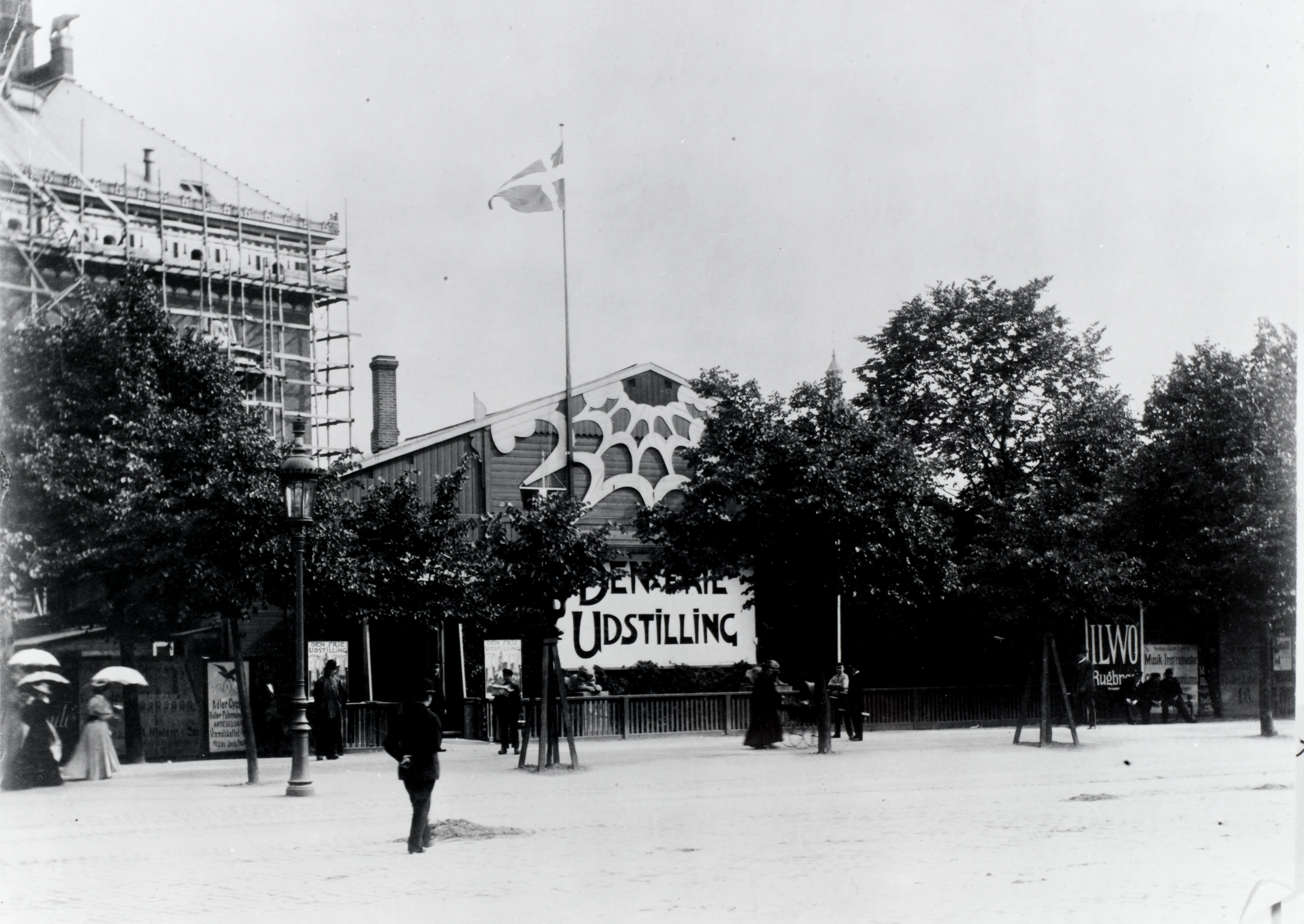
Bindesbøll's building on the new City Hall Square.

In 1893, Thorvald Bindesbøll designed a wooden pavilion for the association on a plot near City Hall Square in the very centre of Copenhagen. That year, international painters such as Paul Gauguin and Vincent van Gogh exhibited works there. In 1898, Den Frie Udstilling moved to Aborreparken where a new pavilion inspired by Egyptian and Greek temples was designed by Willumsen who added an octagonal extension in 1905. As today, the facade was decorated with a relief of Pegasus, a symbol of freely inspired art drawn from Greek mythology. In 1913, the building was moved to its present location on Oslo Plads, maintaining sections of Willumsen's work. In 1915, disagreements among its members led to the establishment of Grønningen but Den Frie Udstilling has nevertheless maintained its central place in Danish art. Since 1950, exhibitors have included such famous names as Ole Schwalbe, Richard Mortensen, Ejler Bille and Wilhelm Freddie, Willy Ørskov, Hein Heinsen and Bjørn Nørgaard.

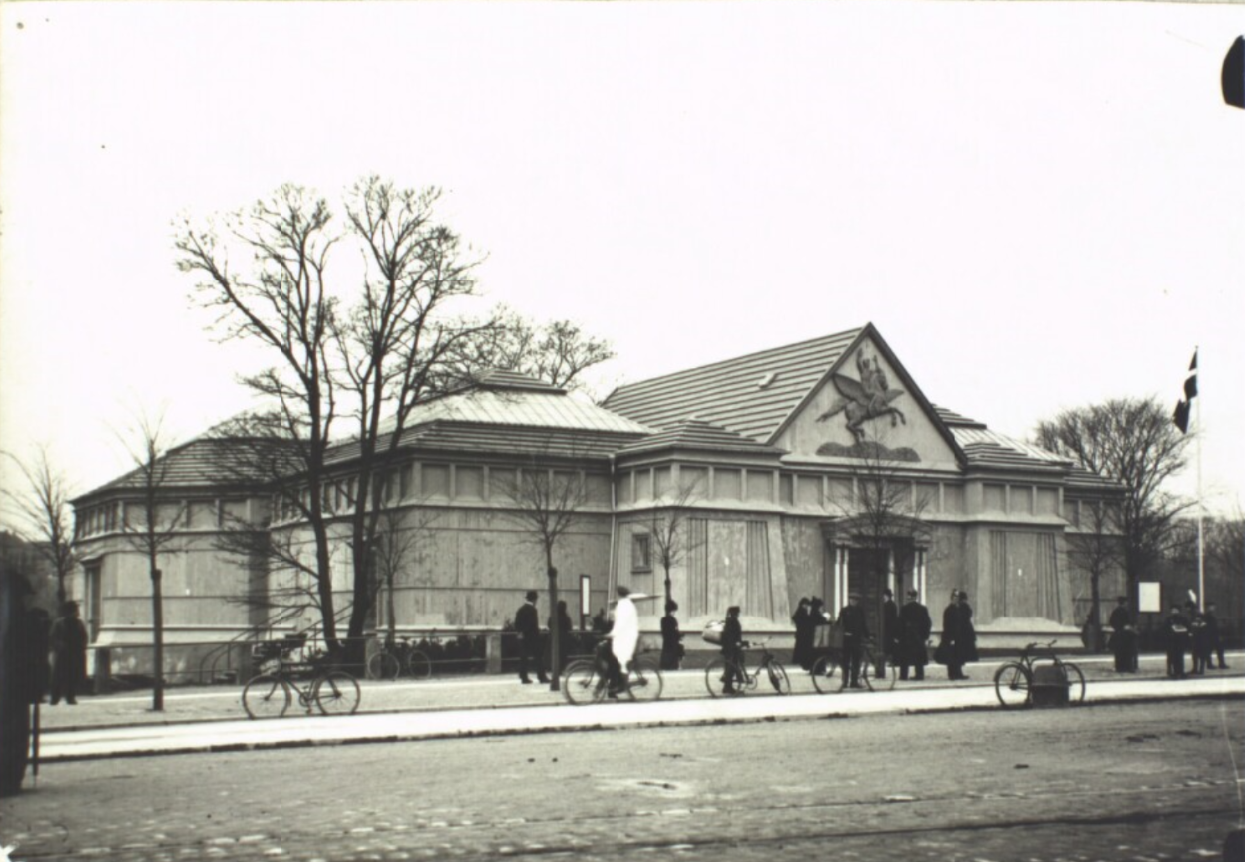
Den Frie at its present location at Østerport photographed by Julius Aagaard

In 1987, Den Frie Udstilling became a listed building. Although comprehensive restoration work was completed in 2006, further improvements reflecting Williumsen's original designs will be completed in 2014. There will also be significant extensions.

== Current exhibitions ==
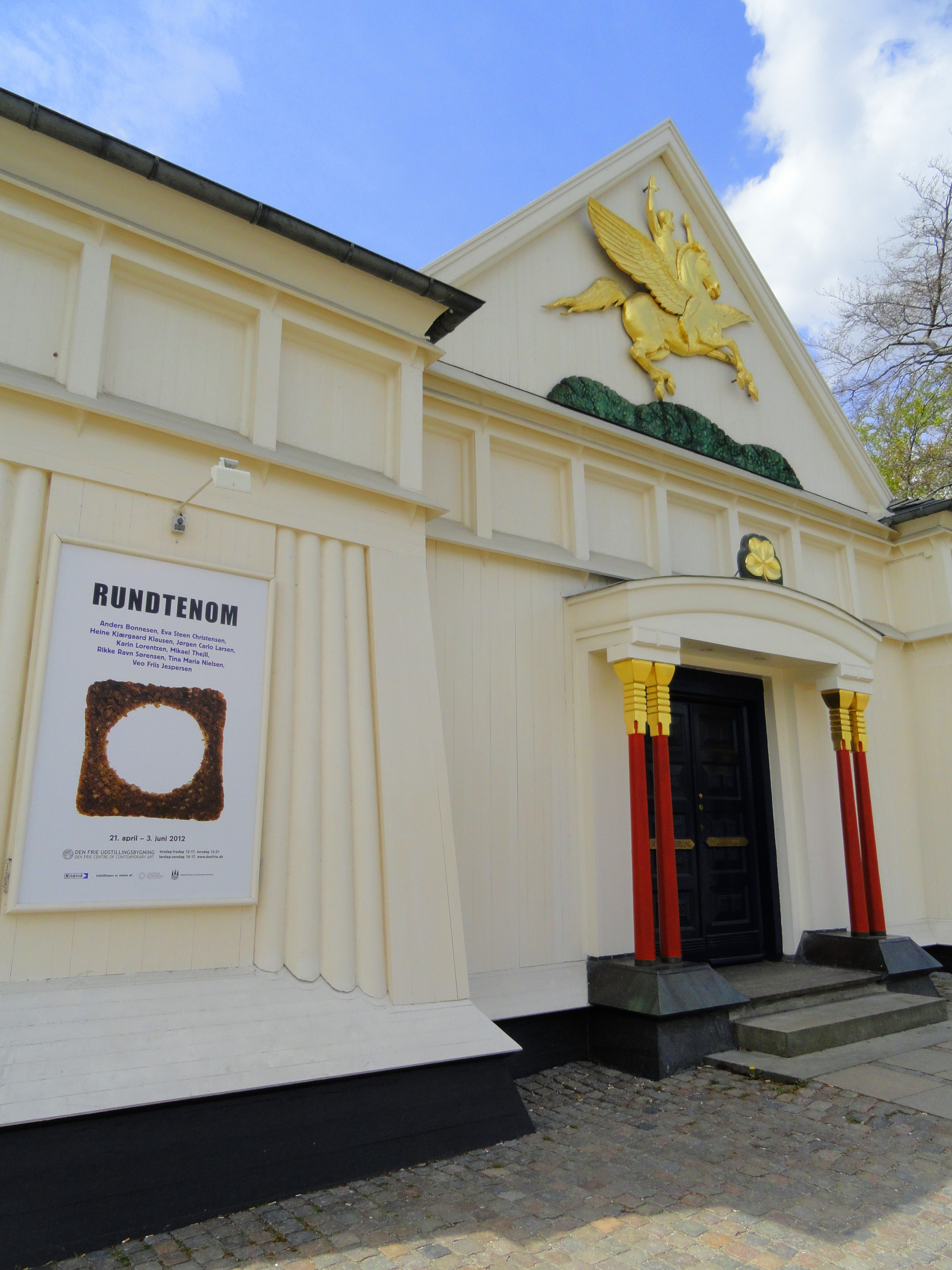
Entrance to Den Frie Udstillingsbygning

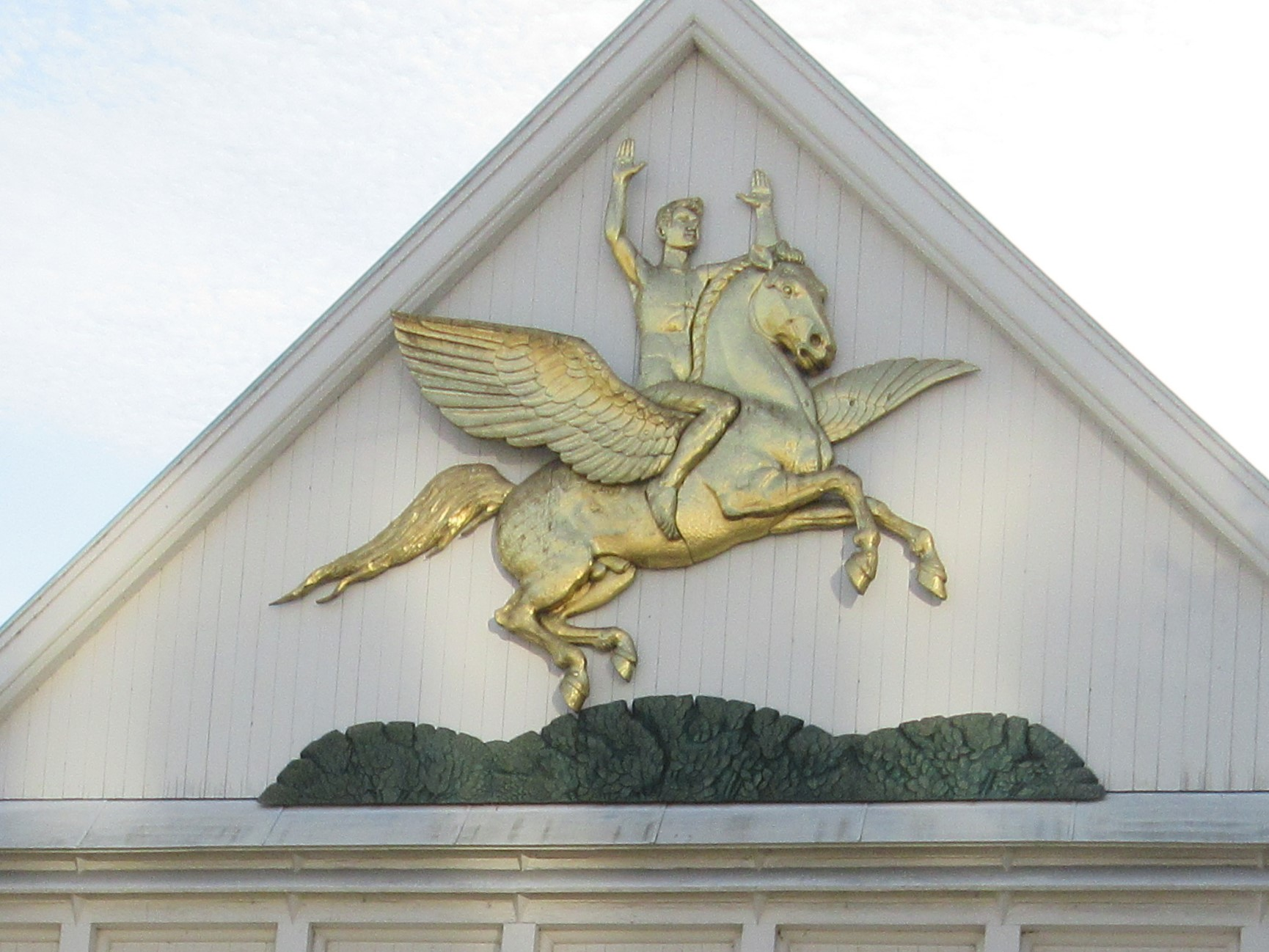
Pegasus

Den Frie Udstilling continues to exhibit contemporary art selected by the artists who are members of the association. As a result, the building hosts exhibitions of experimental art and related activities. The association's goal is to act as a platform for artistic divergence, reducing the gap between tradition and innovation. While a focus on artists' collectives and experimental groups is maintained, there are also exhibitions devoted to promising new artists or those who have made an important contribution to the history of art.

The Artists' Autumn Exhibition (Kunstneres Efterårsudstilling) has been held at Den Frie since 1915. It is an open exhibition, allowing anyone to submit works to be judged by a committee consisting of earlier exhibitors.

== Gallery ==
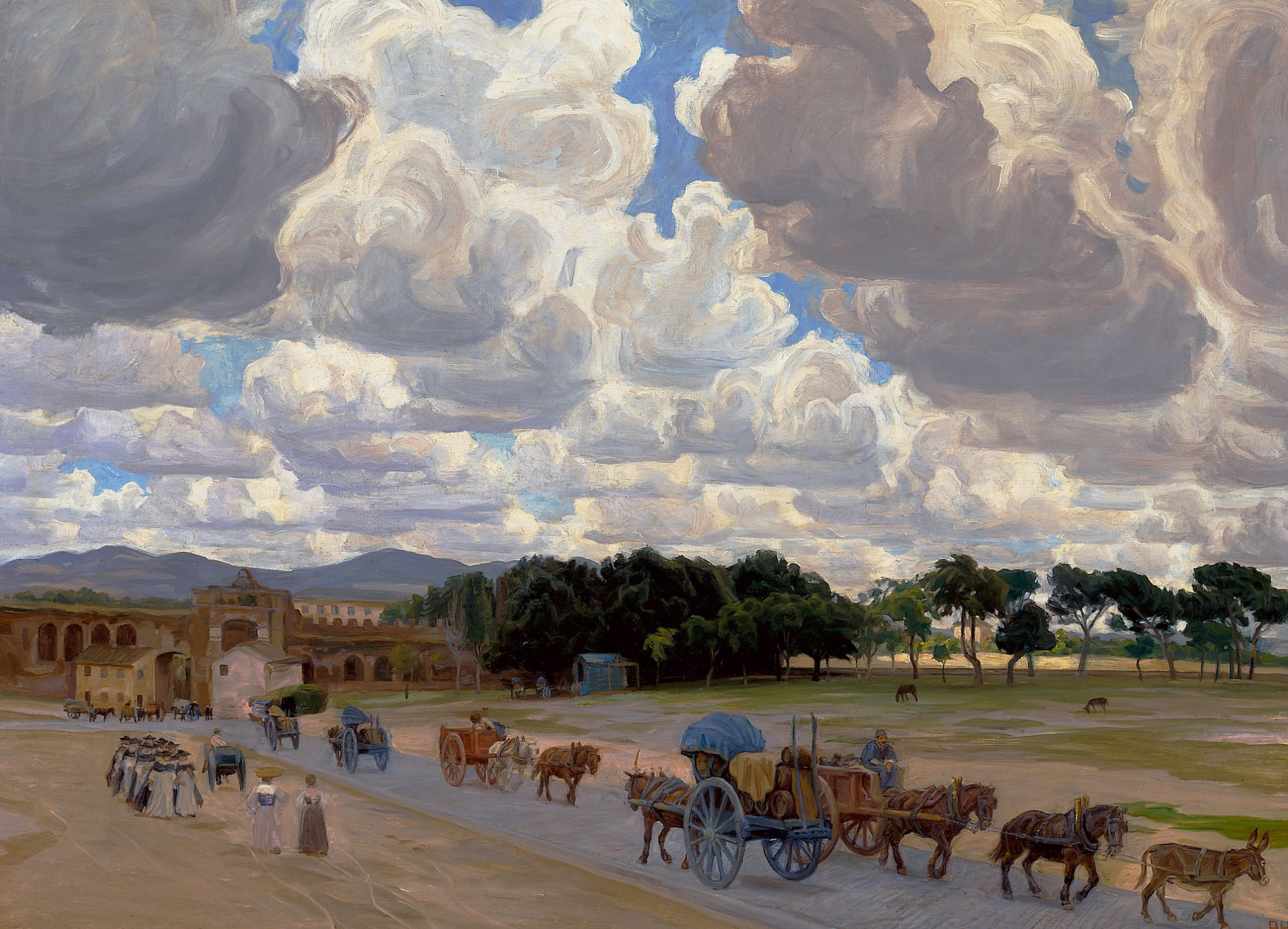
Fra pladsen San Giovanni i Rom
Peter Hansen

Sædemand. Frederiksværk
Laurits Andersen Ring

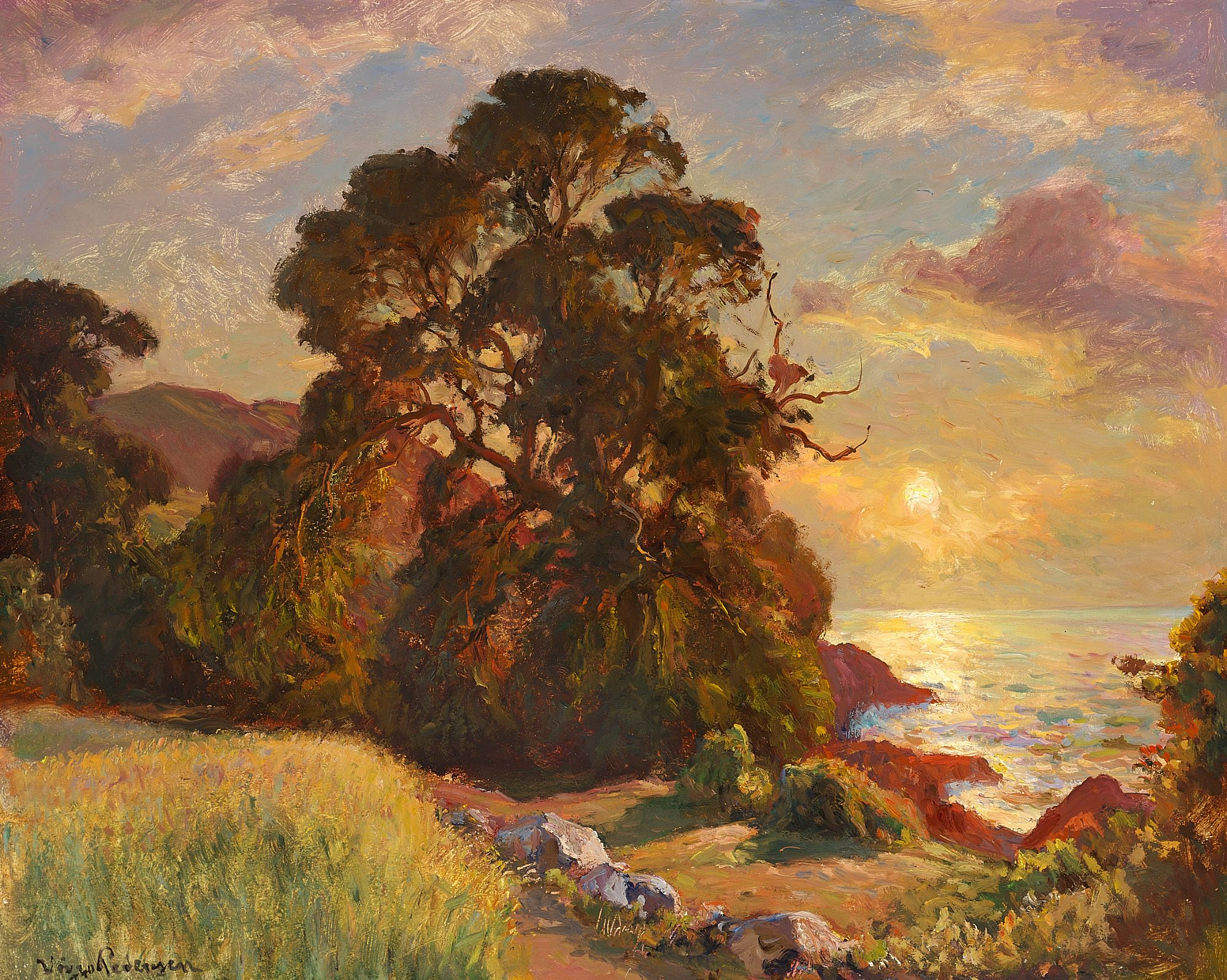
Solnedgang over Havet. Haga
Viggo Pedersen

== See also ==
- Grønningen
- De Tretten

== Bibliography ==
- Bente Lange (2011): Den Frie – Kunstnernes Hus, Copenhagen, Den Frie Udstillingsbygning. ISBN 9788799317837.

== Other Sources ==
- Den Frie Udstillingsbygning FKD
