= Midsummer Night near Vejle Fjord =

1904 painting by Harald Slott-Møller

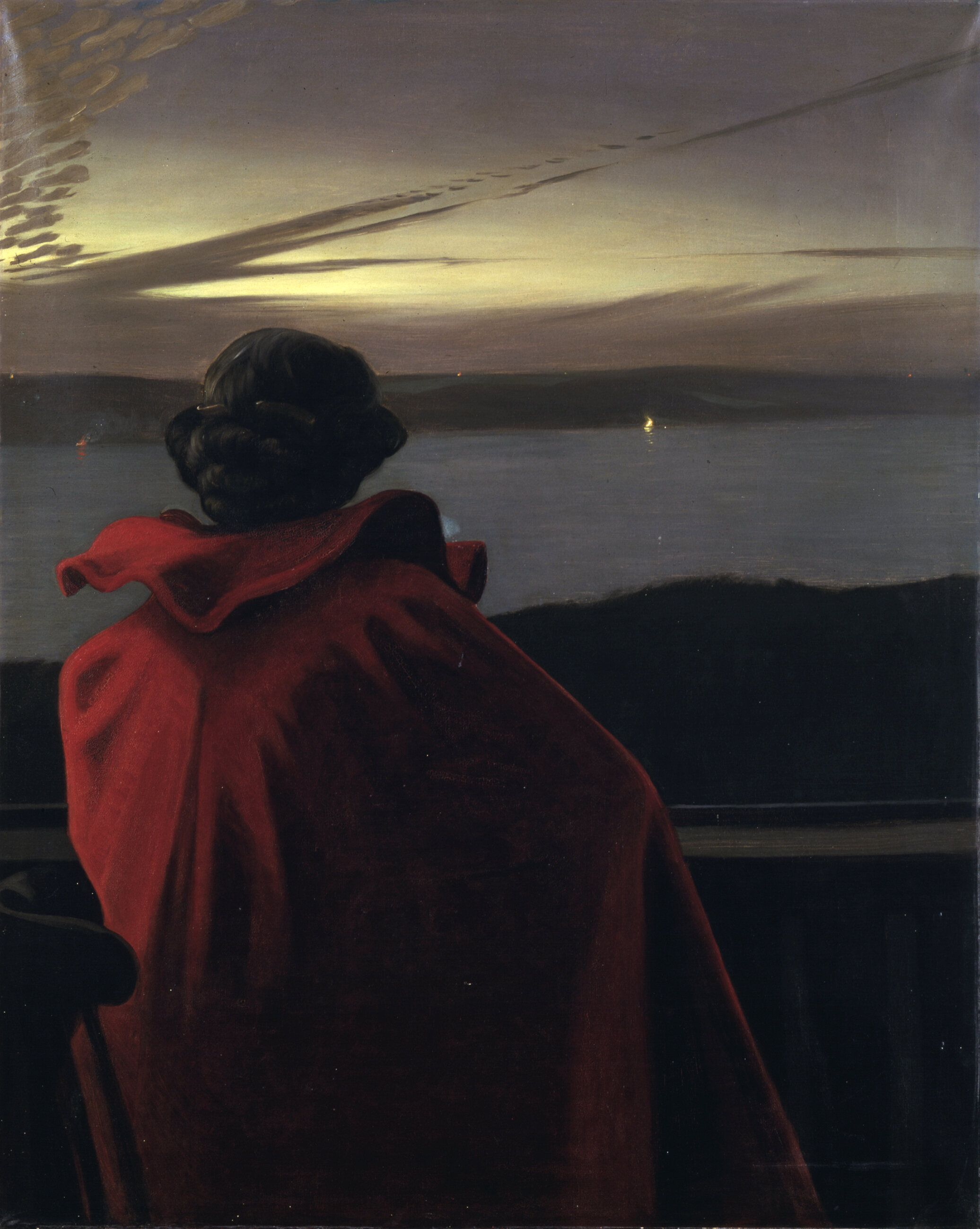
- Artist: Harald Slott-Møller
- Year: 1904
- Medium: oil on canvas
- Dimensions: 139.6 cm × 114.4 cm (55.0 in × 45.0 in)
- Location: Vejle Kunstmuseum, Vejle

Midsummer Night near Vejle Fjord is a painting by Harald Slott-Møller, dated 1904.

== Analysis ==
It is a landscape painting, but can also be regarded as a portrait painting, since the artist's wife, Agnes Slott-Møller, certainly is the seated woman looking out over the Vejle Fjord on Midsummer night.

This painting is characterized by an unusual use of color, especially in the woman's prominent red cape. While Harald Slott-Møller's work was based on naturalism and symbolism, the surface and the colors are also considered to have symbolic significance in this painting.

== Europeana 280 ==
In April 2016, this painting was selected as one of the ten most important artistic works from Denmark for the Europeana project.
