= Kleis' Kunsthandel =

Danish art gallery and gilder

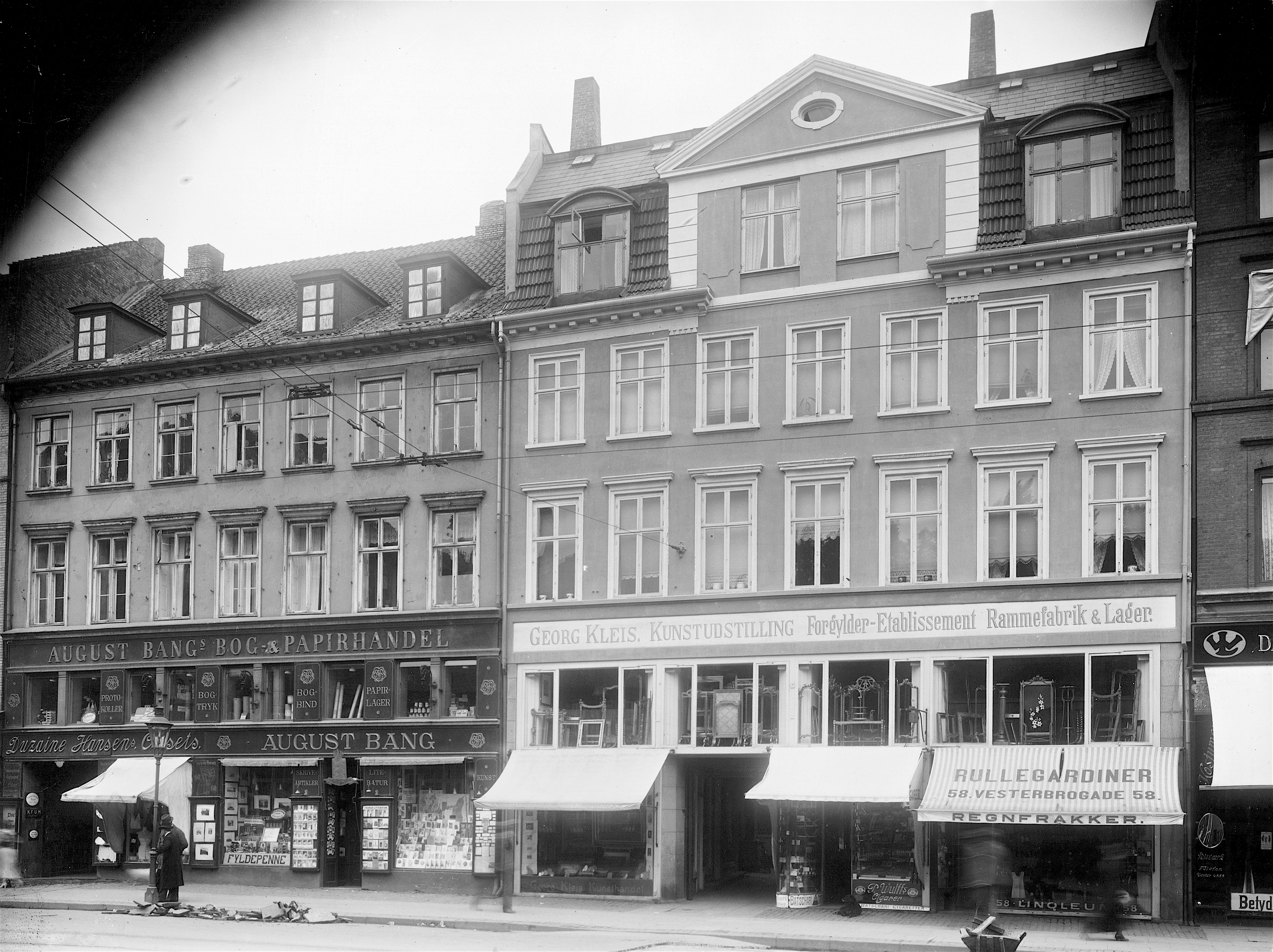
The building in 1919.

Kleis' Kunsthandel was a commercial art gallery, frame shop and gilder's business in Copenhagen, Denmark. It developed into one of the leading art dealers in the city under the management of Valdemar Kleis, its owner from 1878 until 1918. It was based at Vesterbrogade 58 from 1878 until 1972. It hosted the first Den Frie Udstilling (Free Exhibition) in 1891. Another branch was located at Østergade 4. It closed in 1988.

== History ==
=== Origins ===
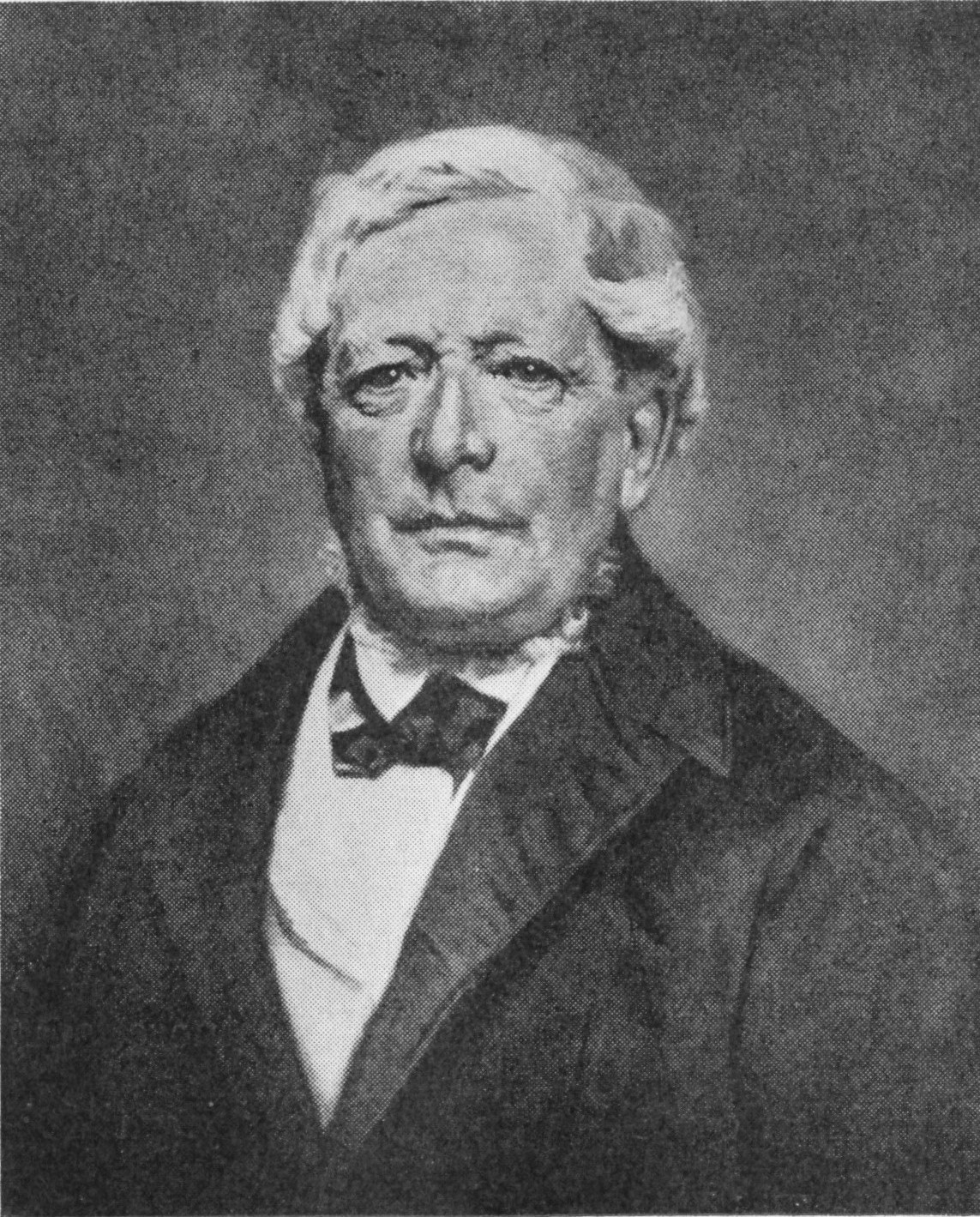
Jeppe Jensen Kleis..

The company was founded in 1831 when Jeppe Jensen Kleis (1804-1882) established a glazier's business and frame shop in Vesterbro.

Little is known about his early life. It is believed that he came from Lemvig. His reason for assuming the name Kleis(s) remains unknown. He was married to Ane Mathea Severin (1817-1905) Four of their eight children survived to adulthood. They resided at Udenbys Vester Quarter outside Copenhagen's Western City Gate at the time of the 1840 and 1845 census-

=== Valdemar Kleis, 1868–1918 ===
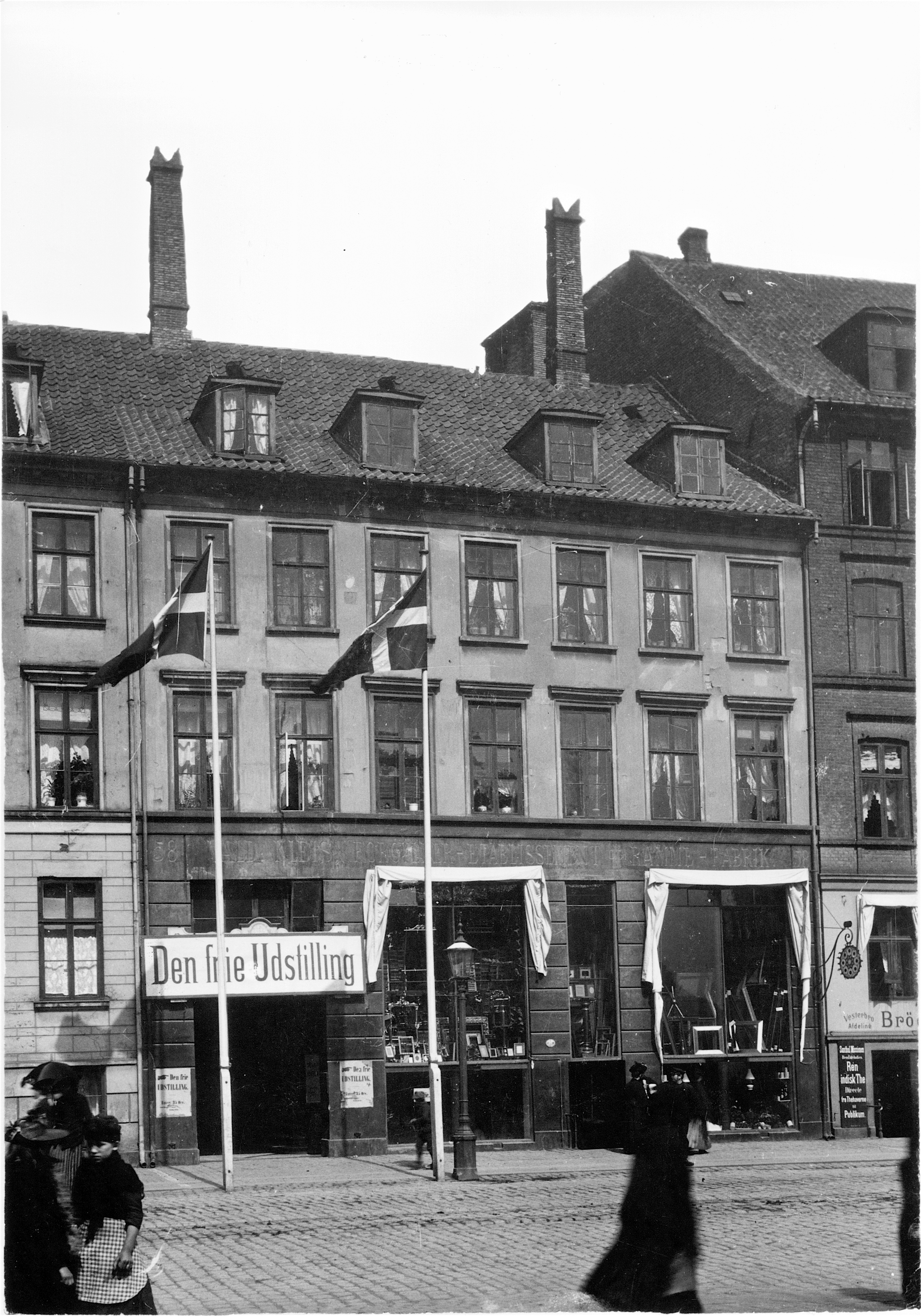
Kleis' Kunsthandel on the opening day of Den Frie Udstilling, 26 March 1891.

In 1868, Jeppe Jensen Kleis passed the company to his son, Valdemar Kleis (1845-1918), under whose management it would later develop into one of the leading art dealers in the city. Valdemar Kleis expanded the activities with a gilding business, specializing in the gilding of artistically carved frames. The company was based at Vesterbrogade 58 from 1878 and onwards. The building was identical to the adjacent Wegener House at No. 60. Kleis would later also open a branch at Østergade 4 in the city centre. He was the owner of both buildings.

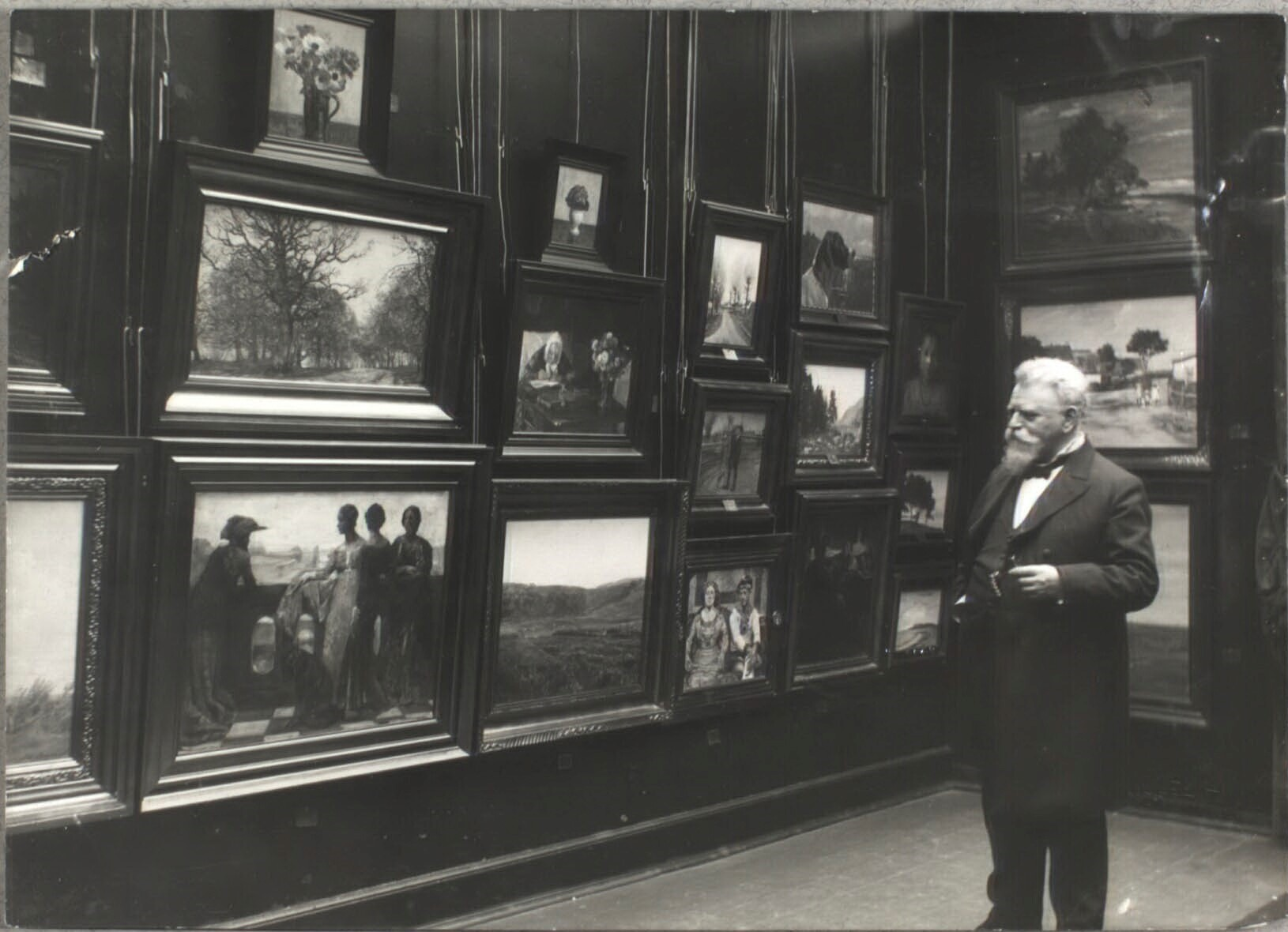
Valdemar Kleis in Kleis' Kunsthandel at Vesterbrogade 58 in Copenhagen.

Kleis' Kunsthandel hosted the first Den Frie Udstilling- It opened on 27 March 1891.

Svend Hammershøi had his debut as an artist at an exhibition in Kleis' Kunsthandel in 1893.

In 1893, Kleis arranged a large exhibition with young French artists with assistance from Mogens Ballin. The artists represented on the exhibition included Vuillard, Bonnard, Sérusier, Banson, Bernard and Félix Vallotton. Kleis had to guarantee DKK 1,000 worth of sales and also paid for the fraight. The exhibition was no commercial success, partly because the works that were sent very small to the extent that Ludvig Find described it as #almost like a stamp collection".

The Vesterbrogade building was at some point expanded with a Mansard roof with a three-bay gabled wall dormer. Kleis resided with his family in the apartment on the first floor of his Vesterbro building at the time of the 1880 and 1885 census. He later bought a villa at Strandmøllen in Springforbi north of Copenhagen. He also owned a villa in Vedbæk and later Villa Strandbakken on Nordre Strandvej in Rungsted. His daughter Ekba married on 4 September 1909 the Nørrebro-based furniture maker Rudolph Rasmussen.

=== Georg Kleis ===
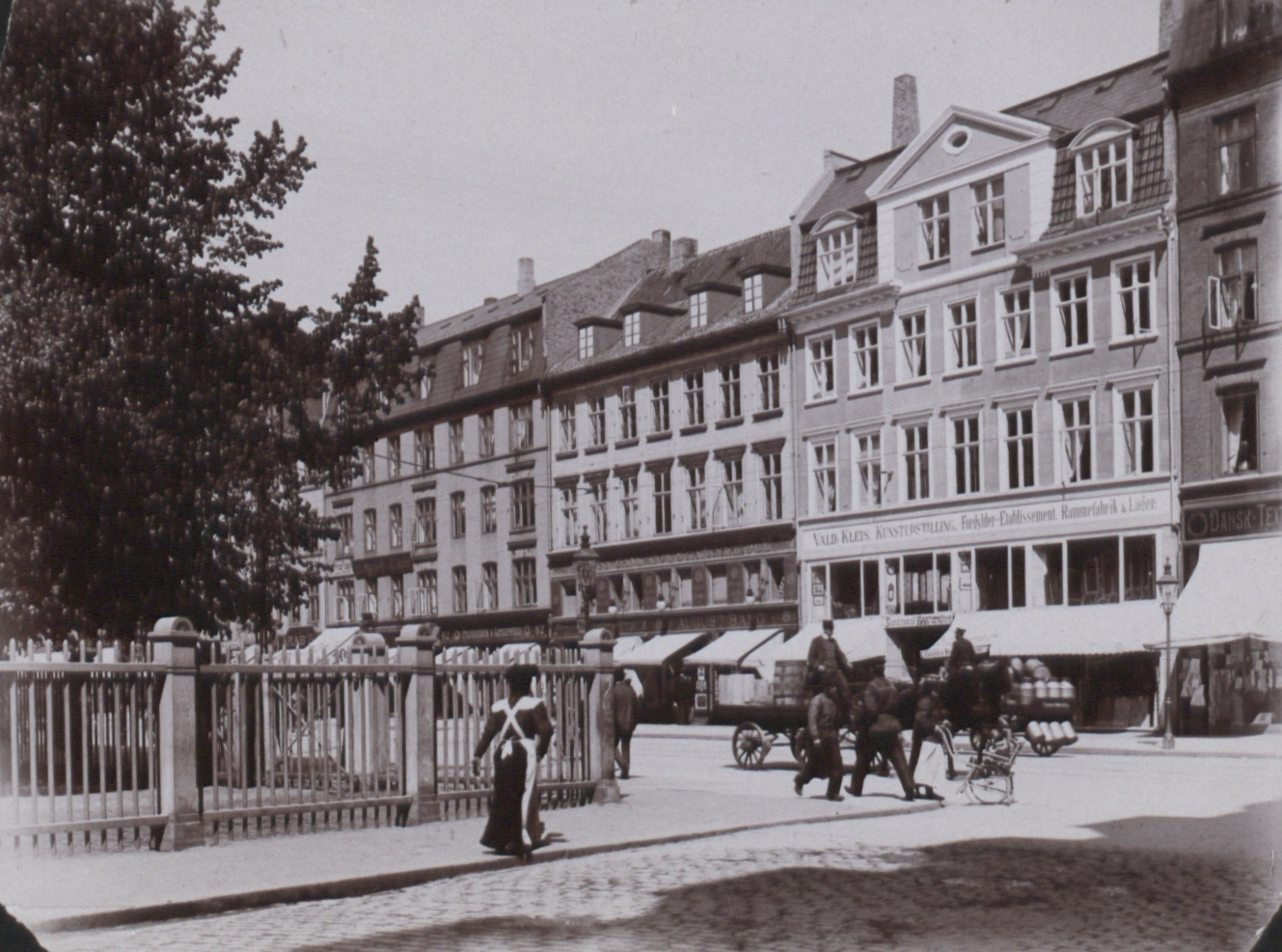
Kleis' Kunsthandel (right) after the building was heightened in c. 1900.

The firm was after Valdemar Kleis' death in 1918 handed down to his son Georg Kleis (1893-1980). Another son, sculptor Hjalmar Kleis (1883-1965), managed a branch on Strøget. In 1918, Kleis' Kunsthandel played host to Herwarth Walden's Der Sturm. International Kunst. Ekspressionister og kubister.

He owned Sjælsøvang north of Copenhagen. He was an enthusiastic fruit grower and beekeeper. He also owned a house in Hornbæk.

=== Closure ===
The branch on Vesterbrogade closed after Georg Kleis' death in 1972. Its former building was destroyed by fire on 17 October 1973 and was later reconstructed to a different design.

The Strøget branch was at some point ceded to Vagn Aage Axelsen (1919-96). It specialized in classical art.
