= Oslo Plads =

Public square in Copenhagen, Denmark

Coordinates: 55.6923°N 12.5867°E

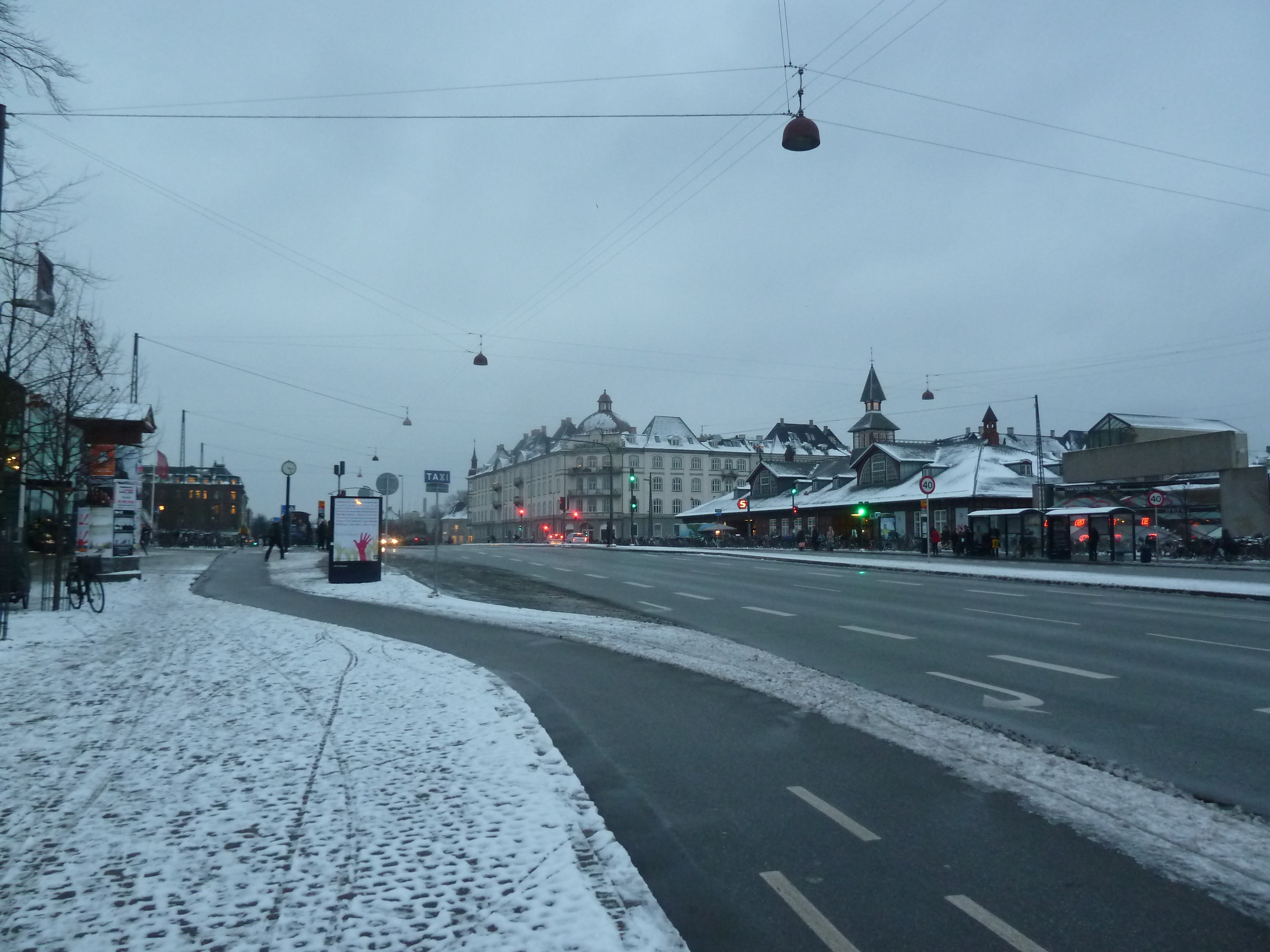
Oslo Plads in winter.

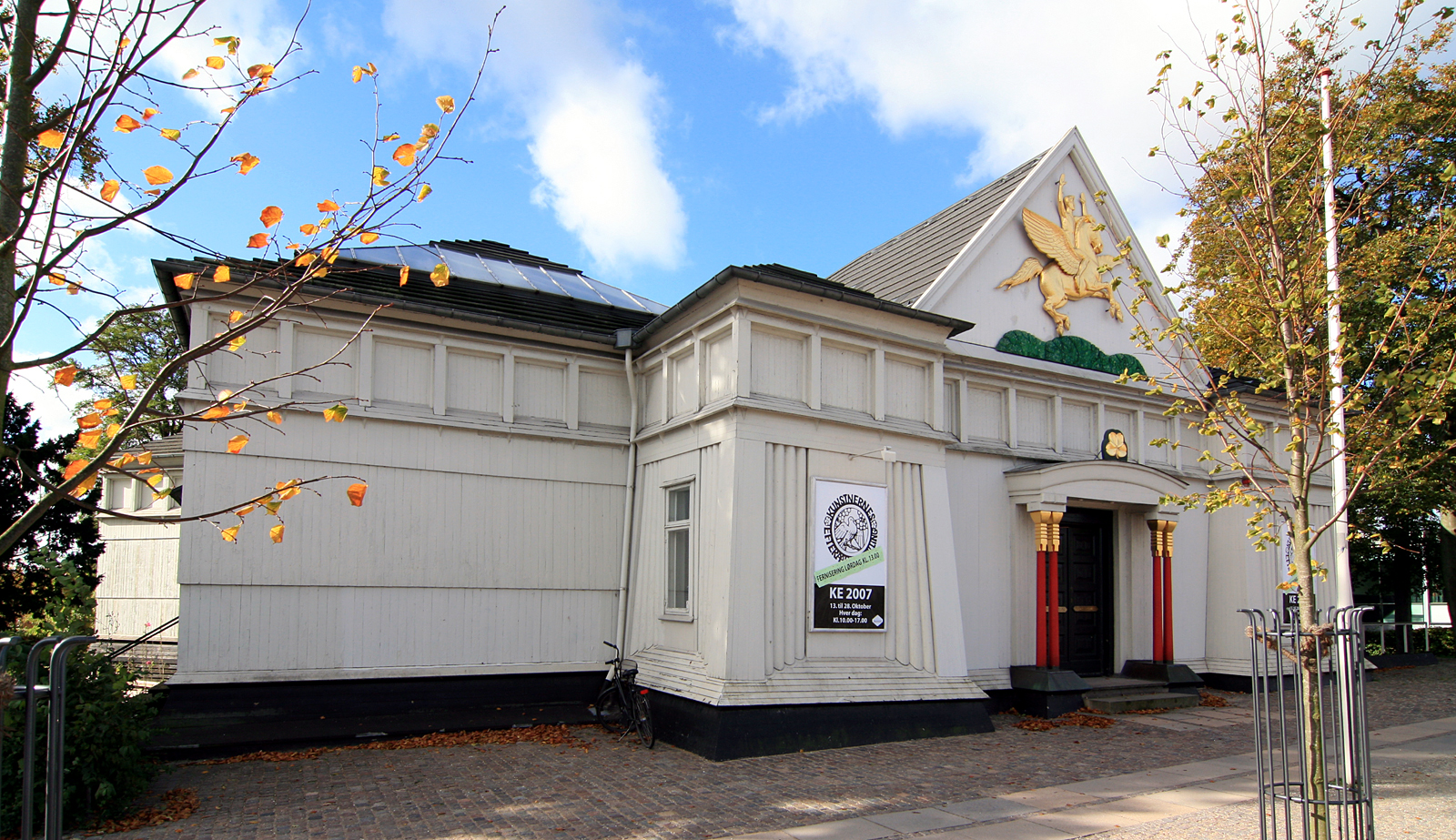
Den Frie Udstilling, Oslo Plads.

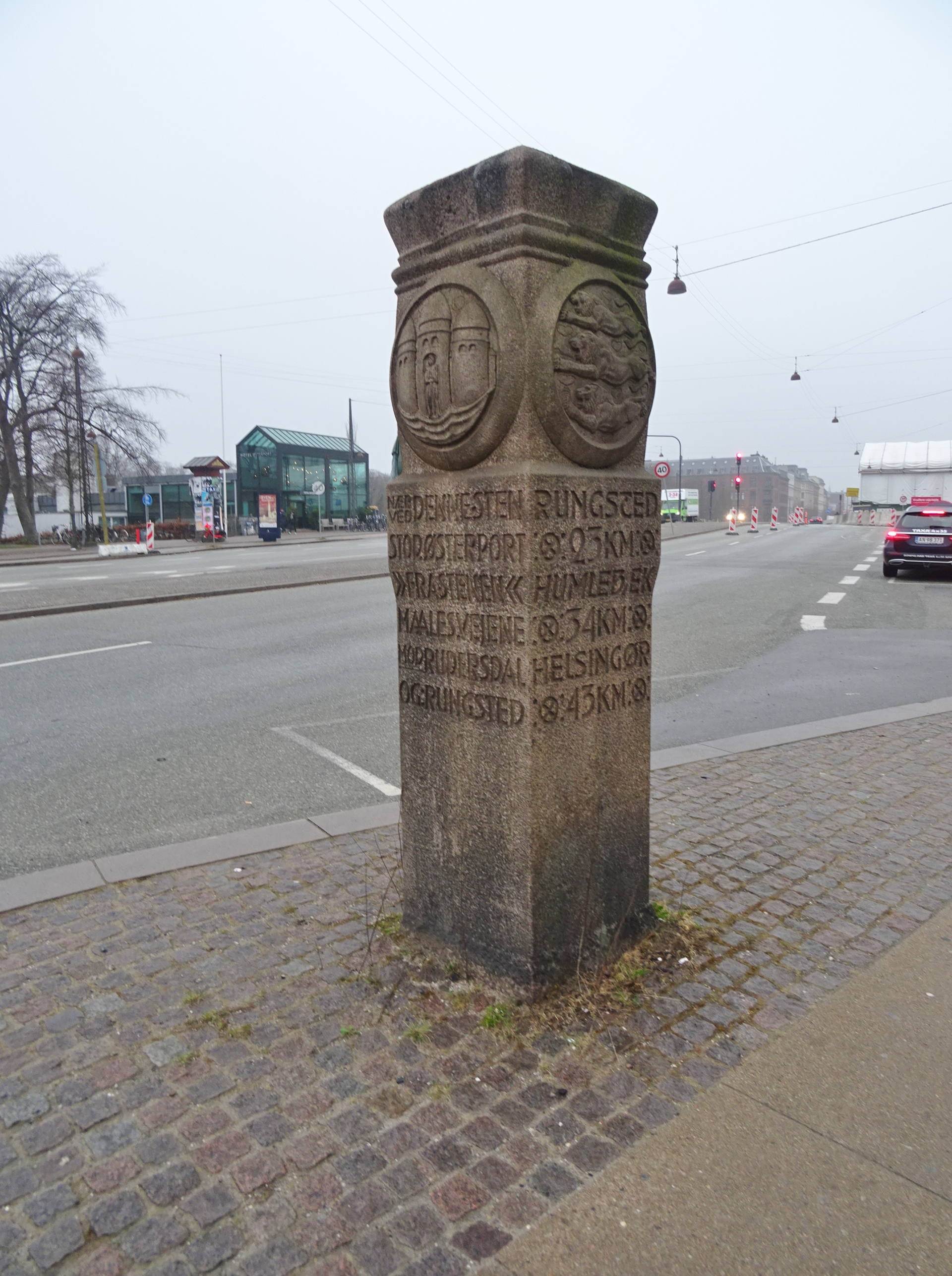
Nulpunktstenen ("the zero point stone")

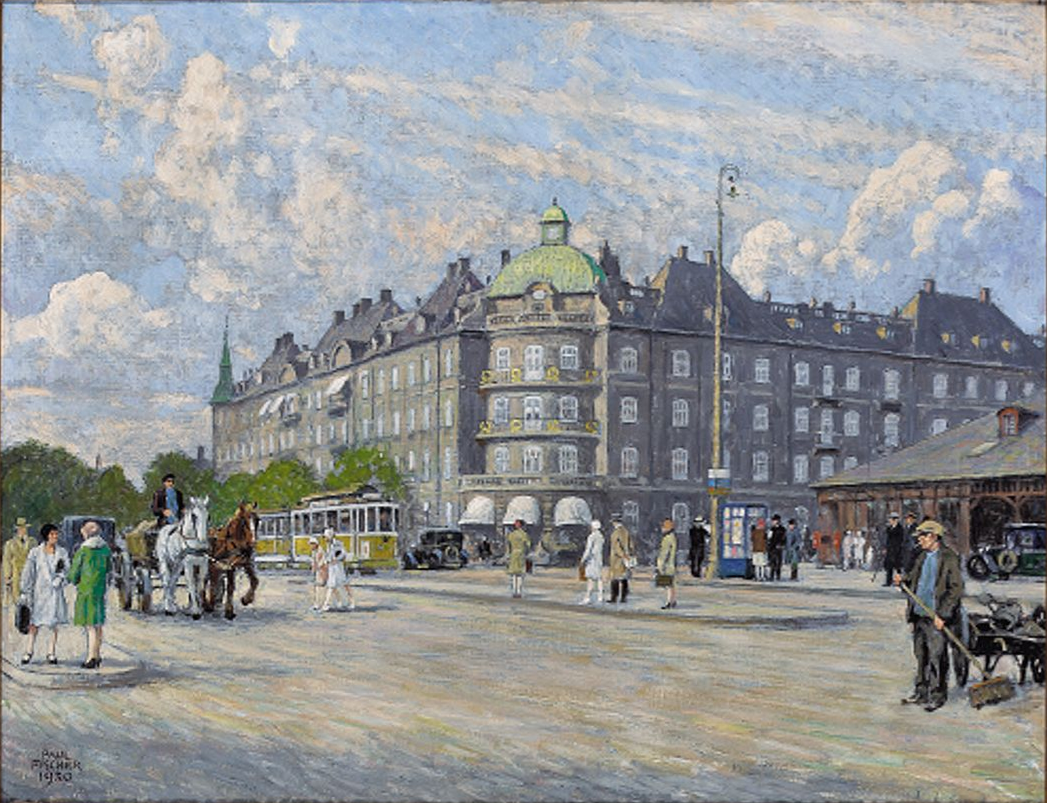
Oslo Plads painted by Paul Gustav Fischer in 1930

Oslo Plads ("Oslo Square") is a public square in the Østerbro area of Copenhagen, Denmark. The square received its name in 1962. Before then, the square was part of the street Østerbrogade. In 1962, the part of Østerbrogade that stretched from Kristianiagade to Lille Triangel ("Little Triangle") was renamed Dag Hammarskjölds Allé (named after the United Nations' recently deceased Secretary-General), while the inner part of Østerbrogade was named Oslo Plads. The name also extends to the neighborhood north of Østbanegade, where many of the streets are named after Norwegian cities.

Where Oslo Plads now lies, there used to be the old Østerport city gate, which was demolished between 1857 and 1858 as the last of Copenhagen's old city gates in the Fortifications of Copenhagen. Now in its place lies Østerport Station, which was erected between 1894 and 1897 by the architect Heinrich Wenck. Across the square from the station lies the Den Frie Udstilling building, an exhibition hall that was originally the old Copenhagen Waterworks. Designed by the painter and sculptor J.F. Willumsen, the building was moved to its present location in 1914 and is protected.

Another building here is the Hotel Østerport, originally built as a poverty hotel after World War II, but completely rebuilt in 1955 and 1990. On the corner of Østbanegade at Oslo Plads 12-16 is a large residential and office property in a mansion style, named Glacispalæet ("Glacis palace"). It was erected between 1900 and 1903 by architect Andreas Clemmensen, who also designed similar houses on Stockholmsgade as well as Otto Benzon's villa on the corner Kristianiagade.

Opposite Østerport Station is Nulpunktstenen ("the zero point stone"). From this stone pillar, which was designed by the architect Peder Vilhelm Jensen-Klint and installed in 1925, measures the distance from where the old Østerport stood to various North Sjælland destinations. There are three other similar zero point stones in Copenhagen: at Nørreport, at Rådhuspladsen and at the end of Torvegade at Christianshavns Vold.
