= Agnes Slott-Møller =

Danish Symbolist painter

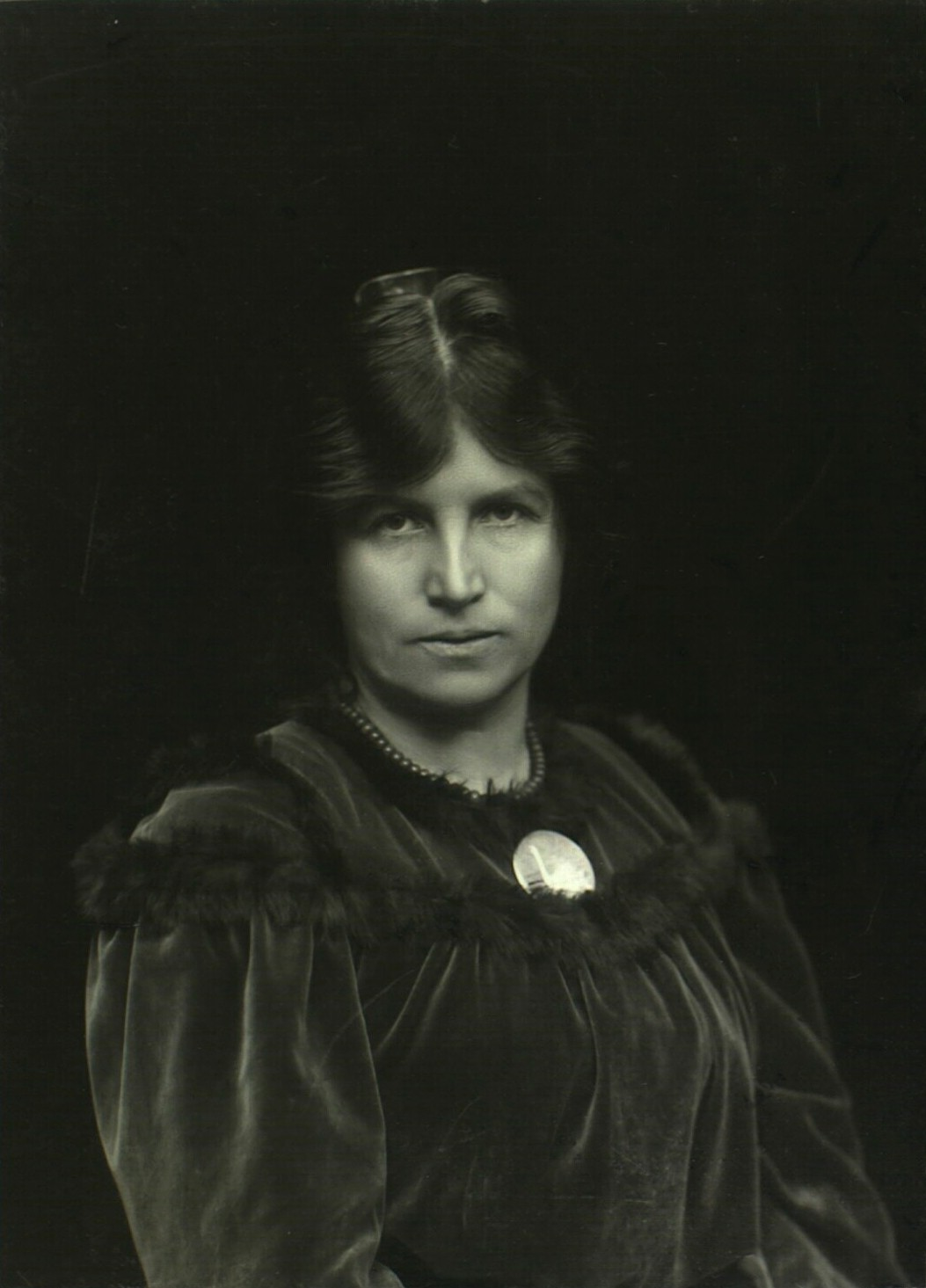
- Agnes Slott-Møller, 1900 by Frederik Riise
- Born: Agnes Rambusch; 10 June 1862; Copenhagen, Denmark
- Died: 11 June 1937 (aged 75); Assens Municipality, Denmark
- Known for: Painting
- Movement: Symbolism
- Spouse: Harald Slott-Møller (m. 1888)

Agnes Slott-Møller, née Rambusch (10 June 1862 in Nyboder – 11 June 1937 in Løgismose, Assens Municipality), was a Danish Symbolist painter; influenced by the Pre-Raphaelites. She is known for works inspired by Danish history and folklore. Her husband was the painter Harald Slott-Møller.

== Biography ==
Her father, Jacob Heinrich Victor Rambusch (1825–1886), was a navy officer who was eventually promoted to Commander. As a child, she was fascinated by the Illustreret Danmarkshistorie for Folket by Adam Fabricius, with drawings by Lorenz Frølich. In 1878, she began taking lessons at the "Industrial Art School for Women". She graduated in 1885 and took additional lessons from P.S. Krøyer, followed by more with Harald Slott-Møller, whom she married in 1888 and embarked with on a tour of Italy.

In 1891, she and her husband helped their friend, Johan Rohde, establish the artists' association known as "Den Frie Udstilling". She had her first daughter in 1893. A second daughter, born in 1901, died in infancy. In 1894, she won a competition to provide decorative works at the Copenhagen City hall. Despite her fervent Danish nationalism, this would be her only official commission.

In 1904, following some disagreements at Den Frie Udstilling, she resumed her showings at the Charlottenborg Spring Exhibition. Two years later, she was awarded the Eckersberg Medal. In 1907, a feud with the Funen Painters, known as the "Bondemalerstriden" (Peasant painter conflict) led to her and Harald's increasing isolation from the contemporary art scene.

She also wrote articles and gave lectures on Danish medieval history and nationalistic subjects. In 1917, she published Nationale Værdier (National Values) and, in 1923, Folkevise Billeder (Folk Images). In 1932, she was awarded the Ingenio et arti medal.

== Selected paintings ==
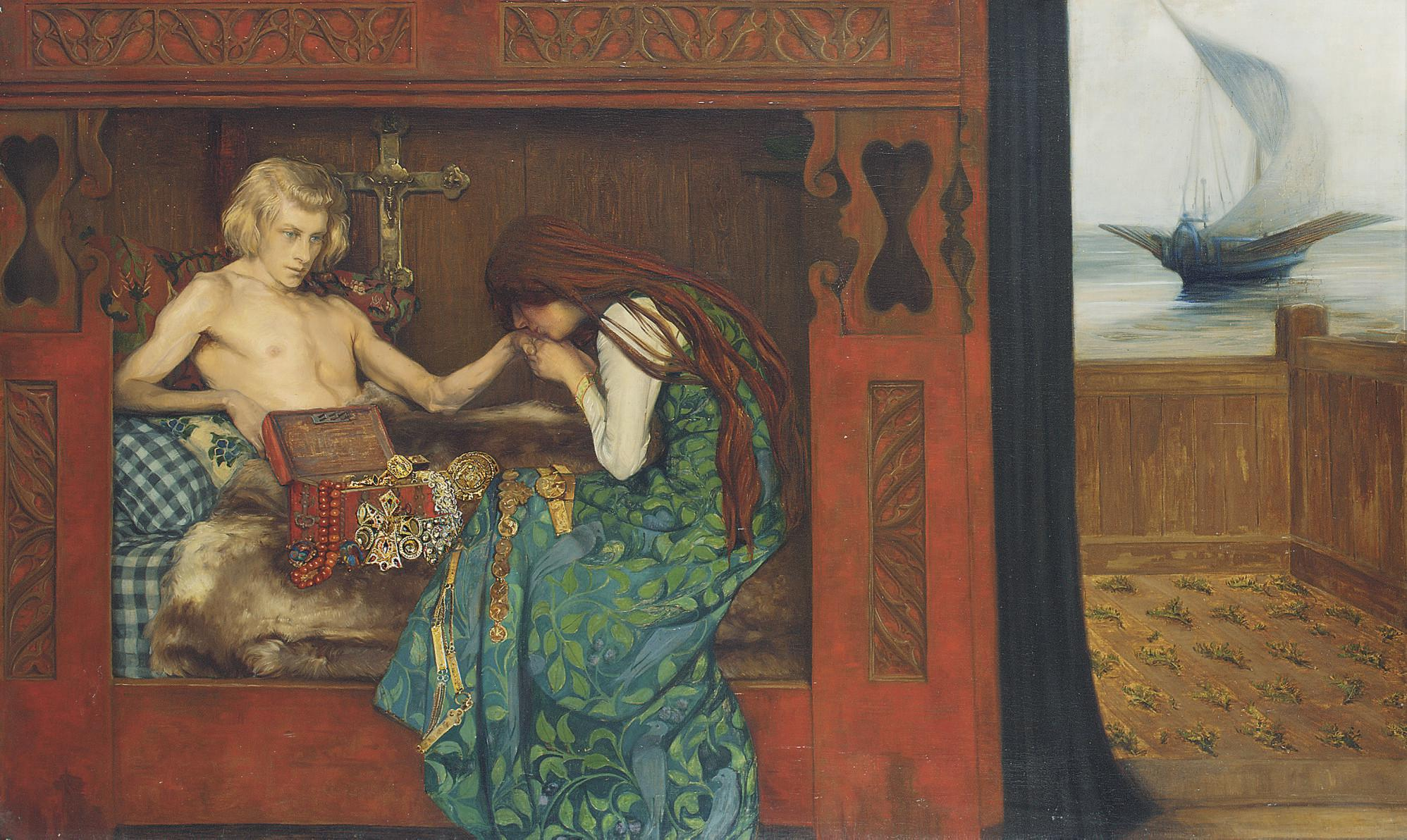
The Dying Betrothed, 1906

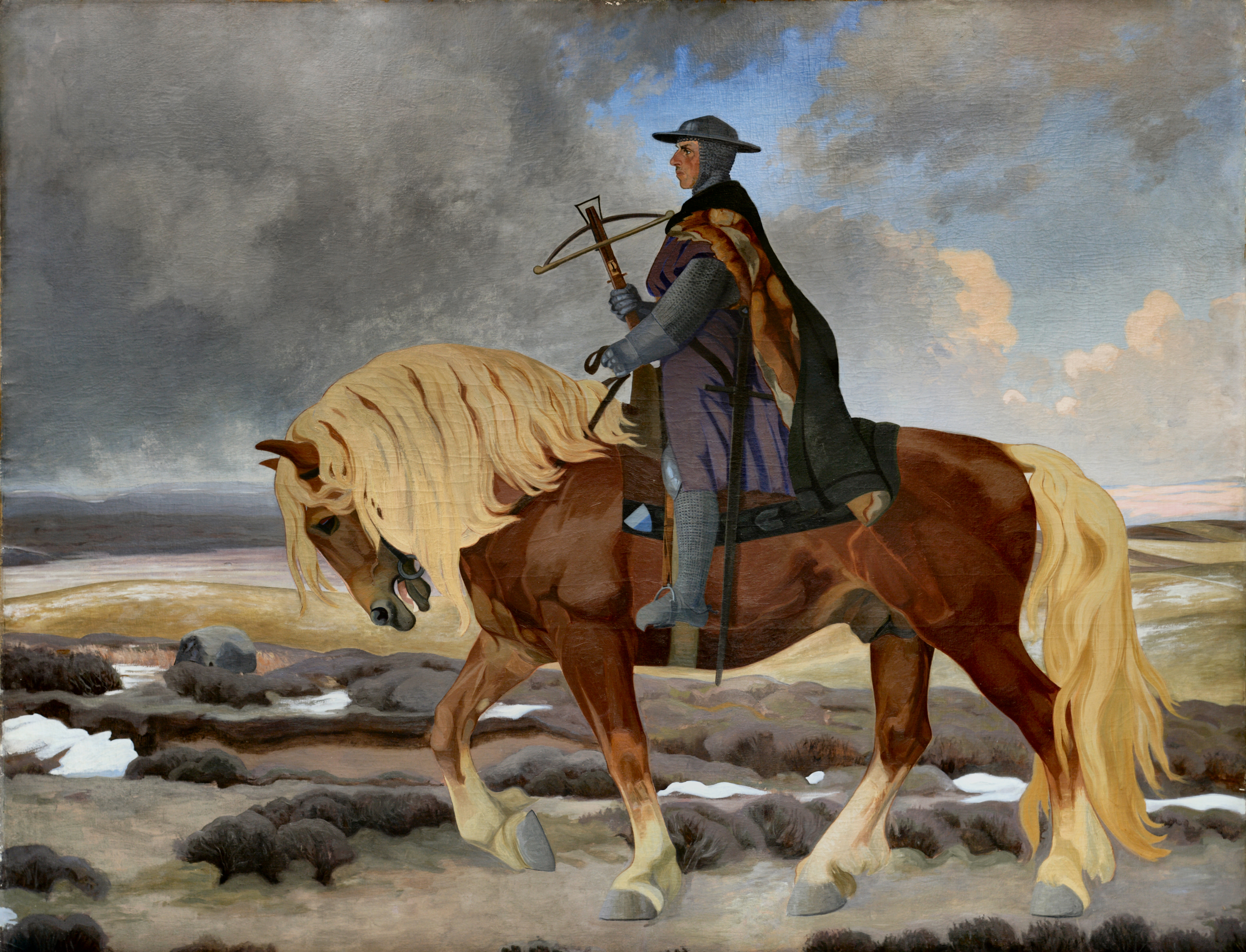
Niels Ebbesen

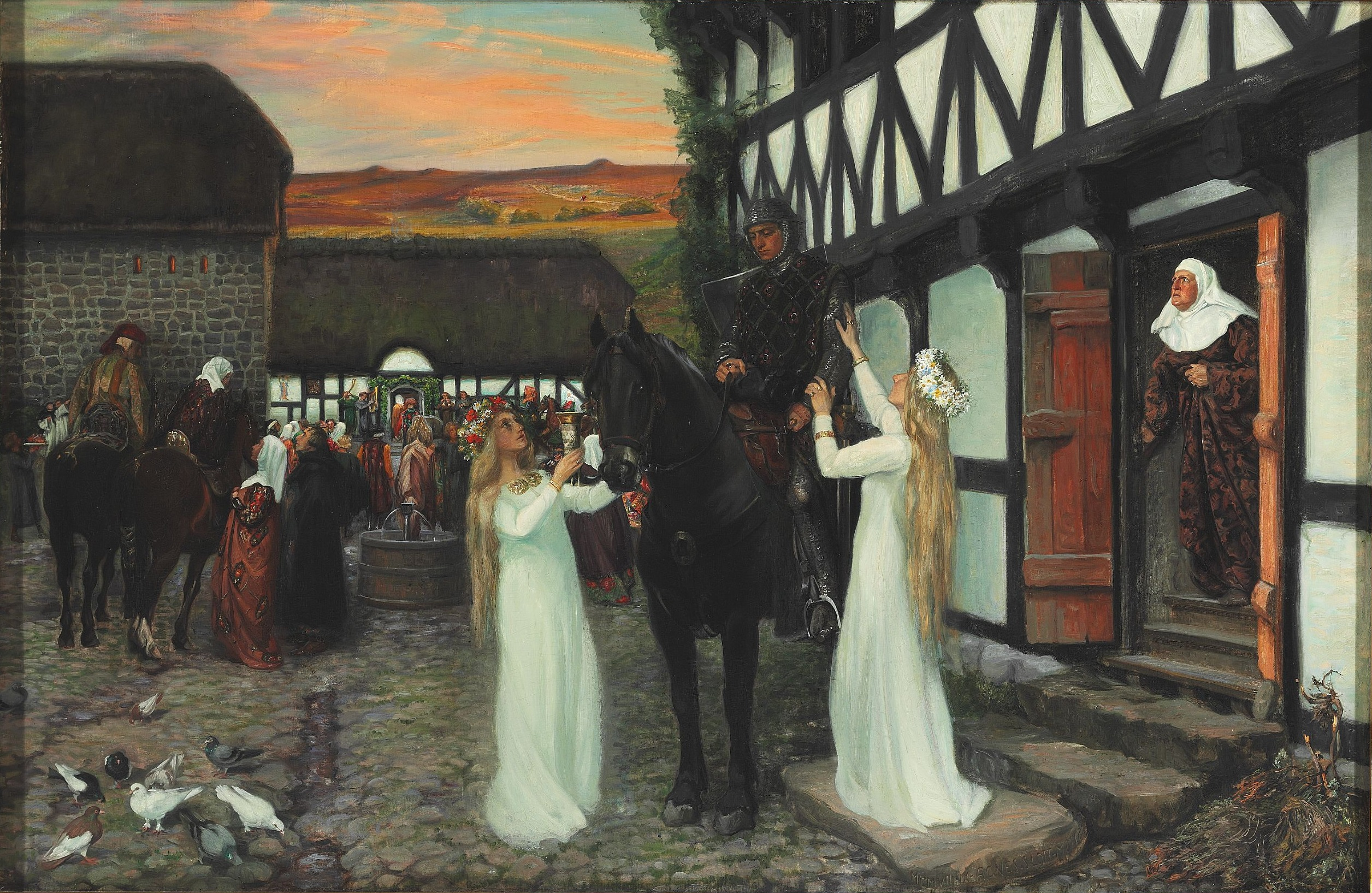
Ebbe Skammelsøn in the Wedding Yard (from a folk song)
