= Harald Slott-Møller =

Danish painter and ceramist

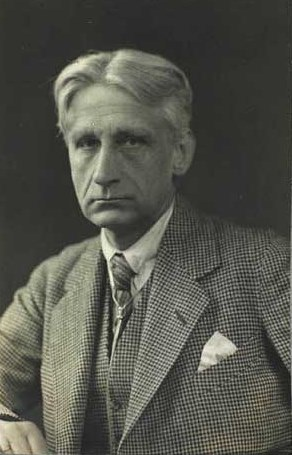
Harald Slott-Møller

Harald Slott-Møller (Danish: [ˈhɑːˌʁɑlˀ ˈslʌt ˈmølˀɐ]; 17 August 1864 – 20 October 1937) was a Danish painter and ceramist. Together with his wife, the painter Agnes Slott-Møller, he was a founding member of Den Frie Udstilling (The Free Exhibition). In May 2026, his 1888 painting ‘‘Summer Day’’ (Danish: ‘‘Sommerdag’’) sold at Phillips in New York for US$1.29 million. The sale set a new auction record for a work by Slott-Møller.Downes, Annabel (22 May 2026). "17 New Artist Auction Records Set in May 2026". Artsy."Harald Slott-Møller: Works for Sale, Upcoming Auctions & Past Results". Phillips.

== Early life ==
Born in Copenhagen, Slott-Møller was the son of merchant Carl Emil Møller and Anna Maria née Møller. After completing the preparatory course at the Royal Danish Academy of Fine Arts (1883), he painted for three years under Peder Severin Krøyer.

== Career ==
Slott-Møller first exhibited in 1886 at the Charlottenborg Spring Exhibition and attracted attention in 1888 with his large lively work Fattigfolk i Fattiglægens Venteværelse (Poor People in the Poor Doctor's Waiting Room). He exhibited at Kunsthal Charlottenborg and Den Frie Udstilling with individual portraits, such as that of Georg Brandes (Georg Brandes at the University in Copenhagen, 1889), and landscapes, which often featured a prominent spot. A change in style occurred in the early 1890s as can be seen in his portrait of the sculptor Anne Marie Brodersen, in which her fair hair is covered with gold, as are the cornfields in one of his landscapes. Then followed a series of painting which ensured him a place as one of the principal participants in 1890 painting: Tre kvinder (Three Women), Foraaret (Spring), and his strikingly symbolic work Primavera (1901). Slott-Møller is remembered for his portraits of well-known figures from Southern Jutland and South Schleswig, often characterized with customized backgrounds such as a landscape or appropriate buildings.

He also worked at the faience factory Aluminia from 1902 to 1906 designing a number of notable items together with Christian Joachim. As a result, Slott-Møller gained wide recognition as one of the leading craftsmen of the turn of the century. Although he continued to paint, opinions about his work became ever less supportive, partly on artistic grounds but also as a result of his attitude towards the public.

In 1919, he became a Knight of the Dannebrog. He was a founding member of Den Frie Udstilling (The Free Exhibition). He is buried at Holmens Cemetery.

Slott-Møller is portrayed in a double portrait: Ude eller Kammerater (Out or Comrades, 1886) in which he and his wife have painted each other. Another self-portrait based on a study drawing was Trækfuglene (Migratory Birds, 1909). There is also a self-portrait in Florence's Uffizi Gallery (1924).

== Selected paintings ==
Nude Girls, c. 1910

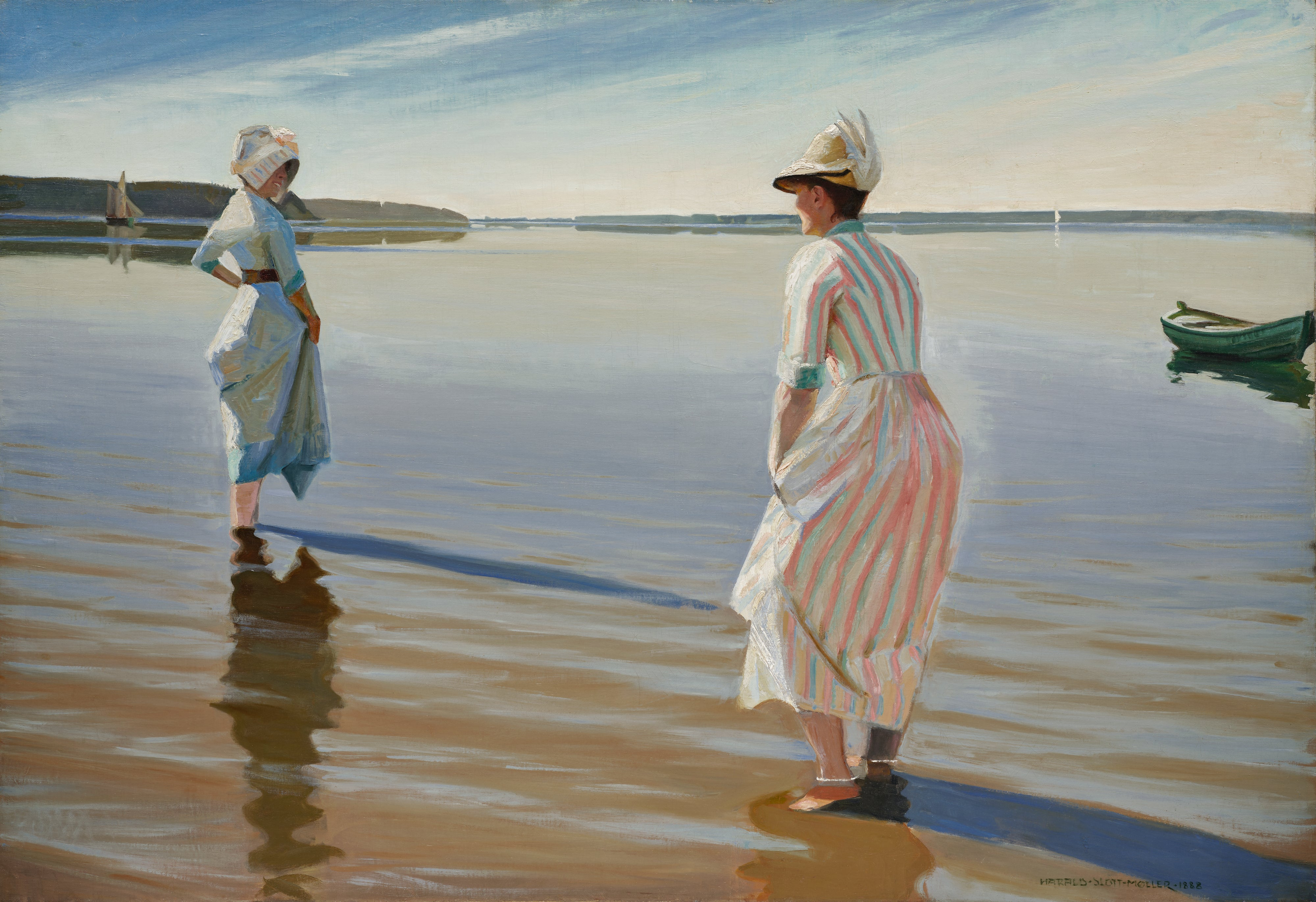
Summer Day, 1888

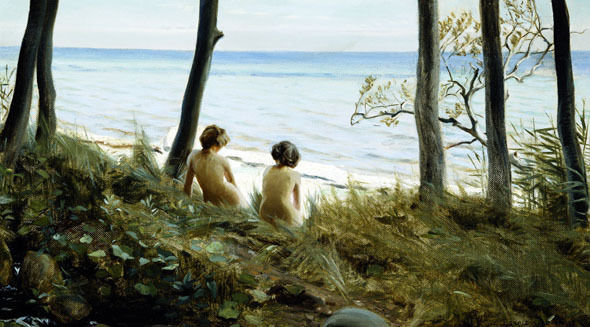
On the beach, 1907

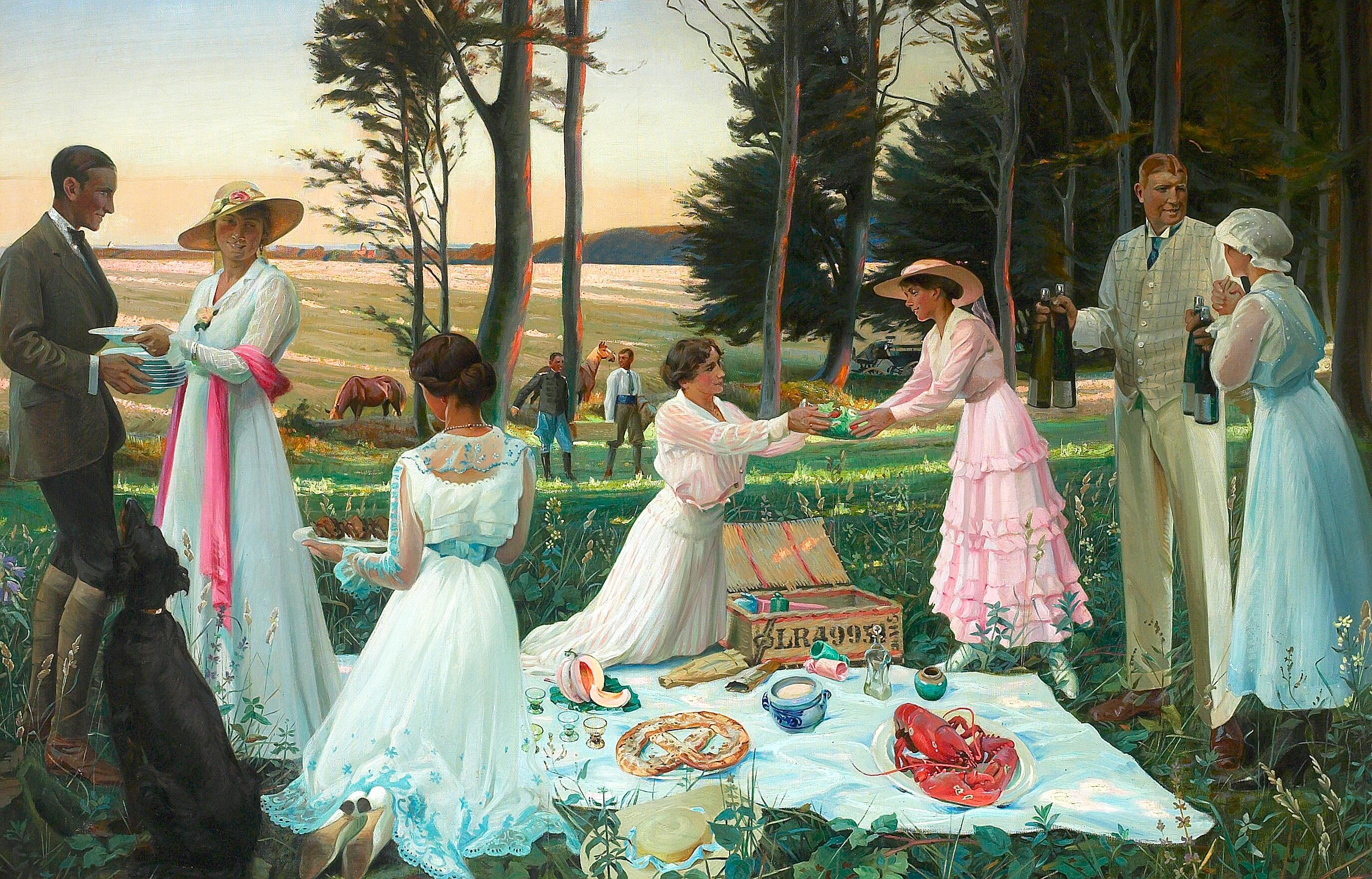
Picnic, 1919

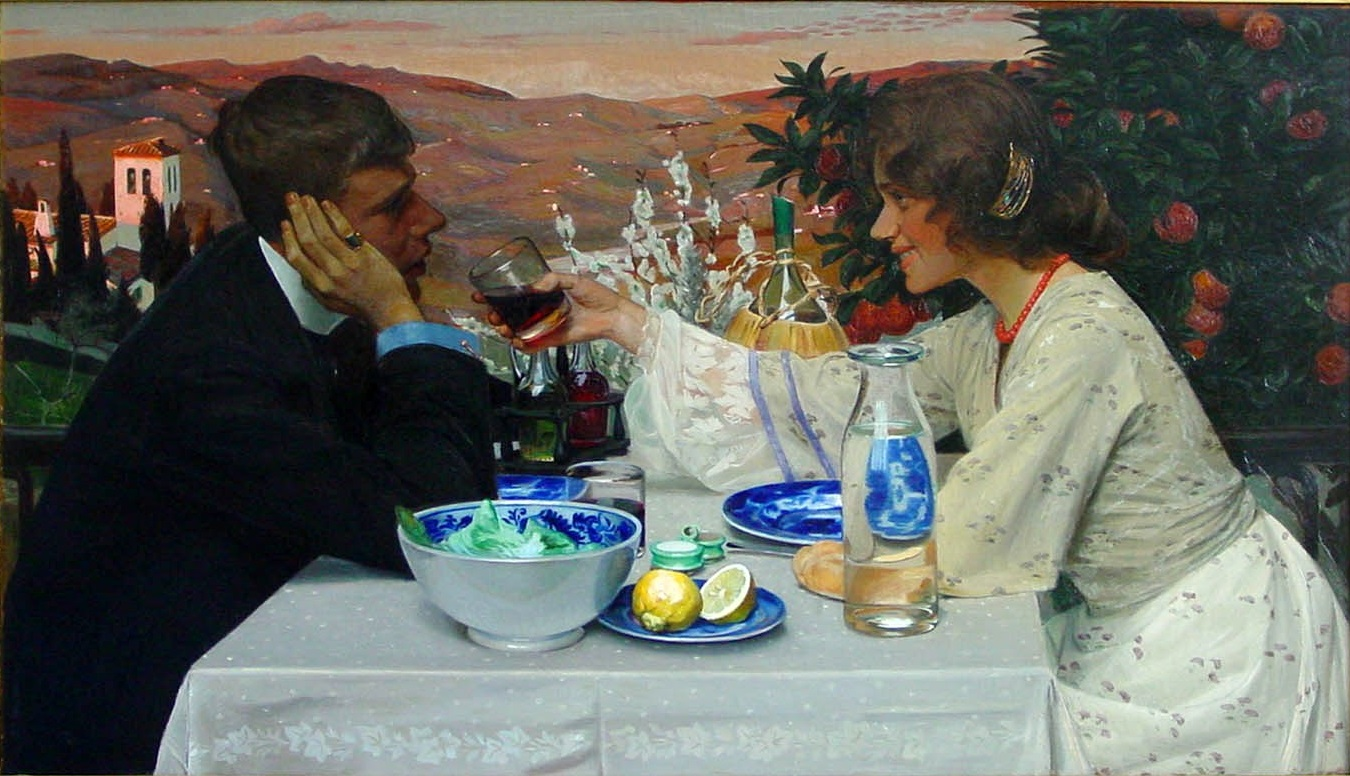
Primavera, 1901

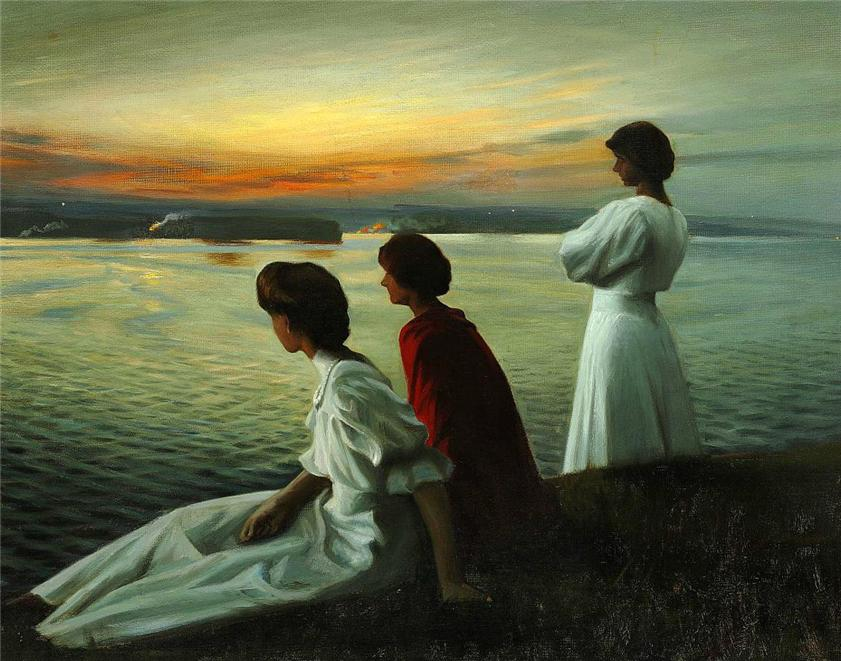
Midsummer's Eve, 1904

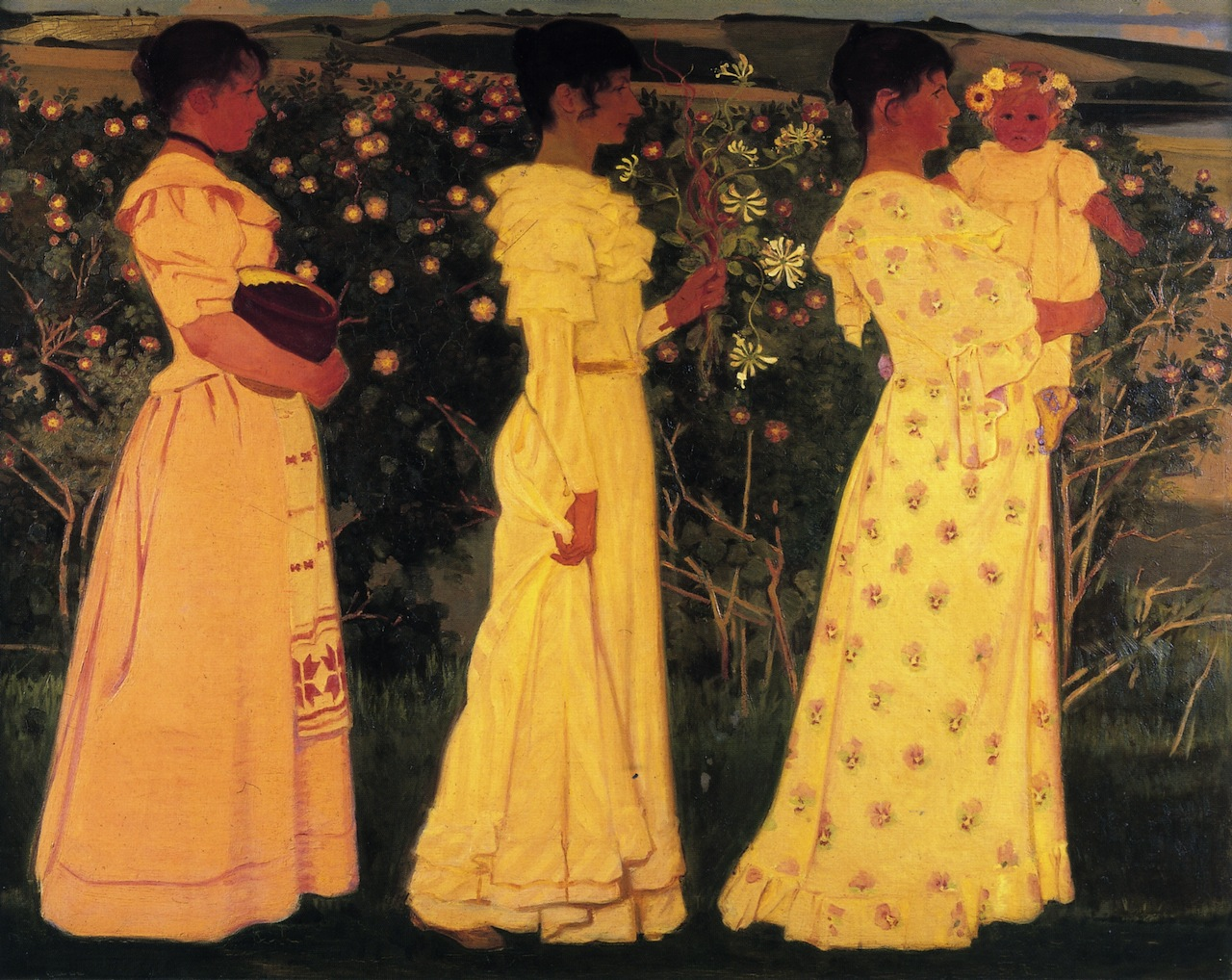
Three Women, 1895

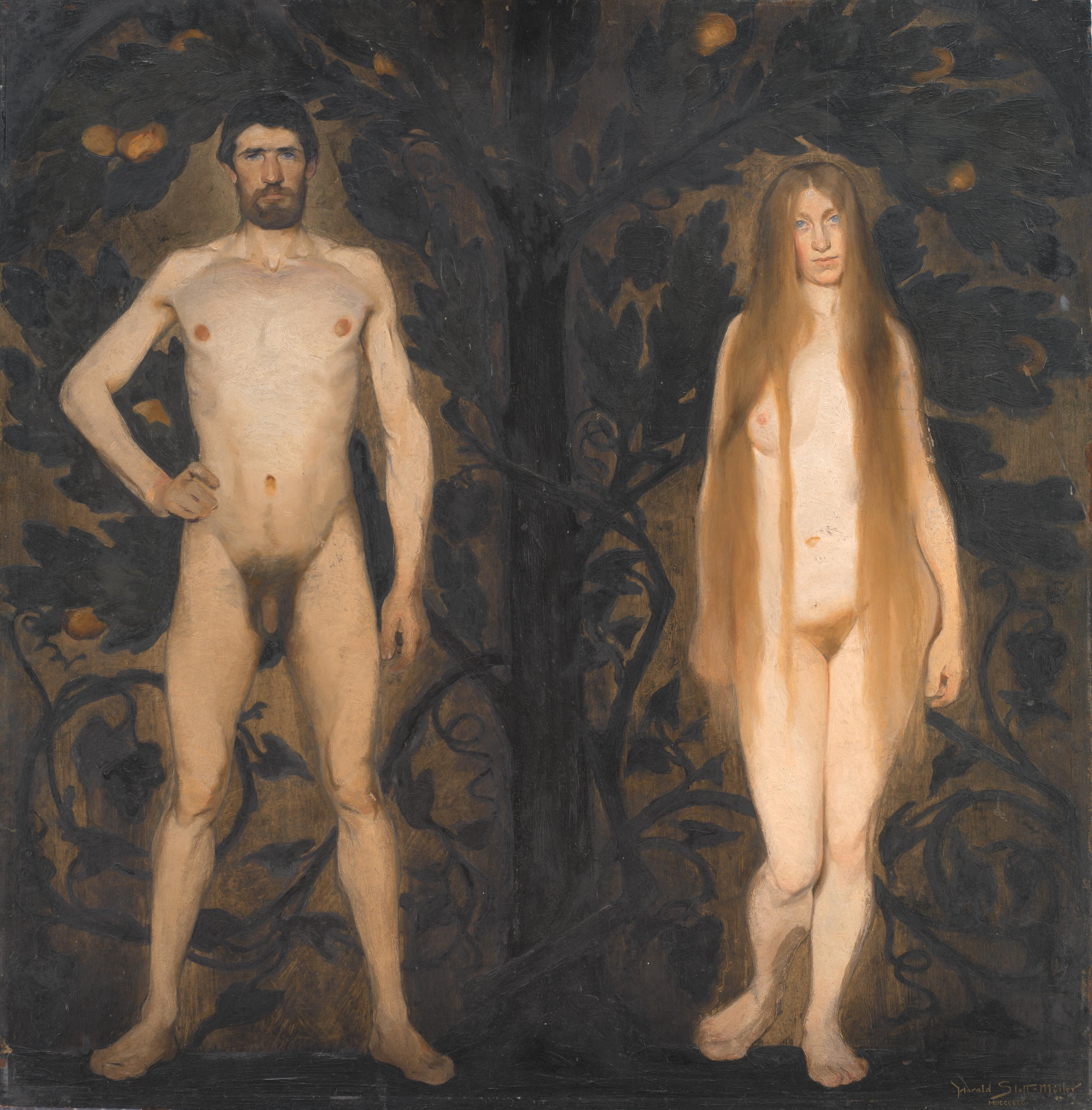
Adam and Eve, 1891

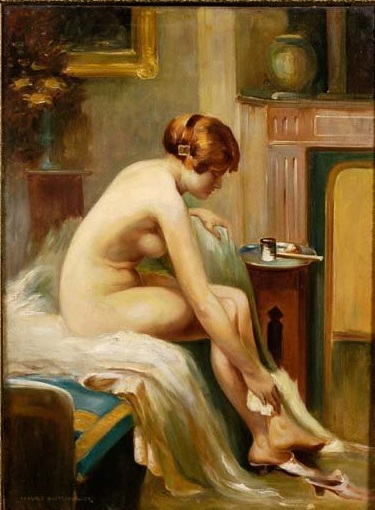
Nude, 1910

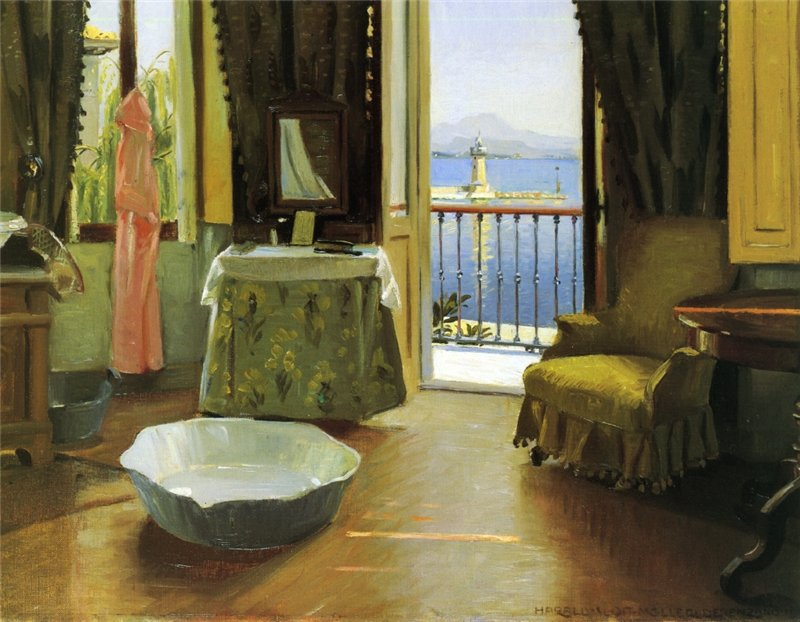
At the Garda Lake, 1910

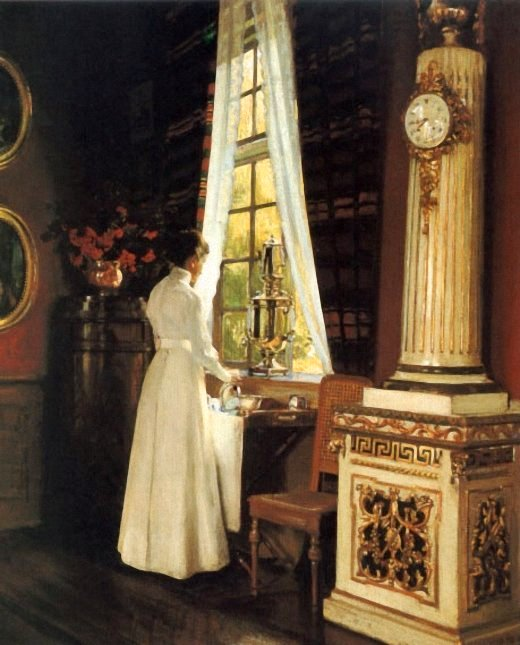
Morning Coffee, c. 1910

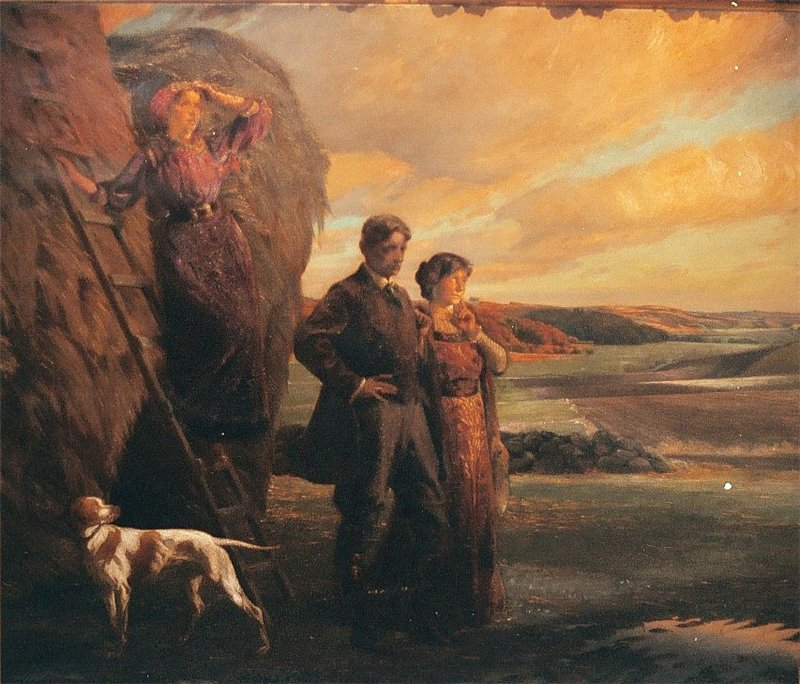
Birdwatching, 1909

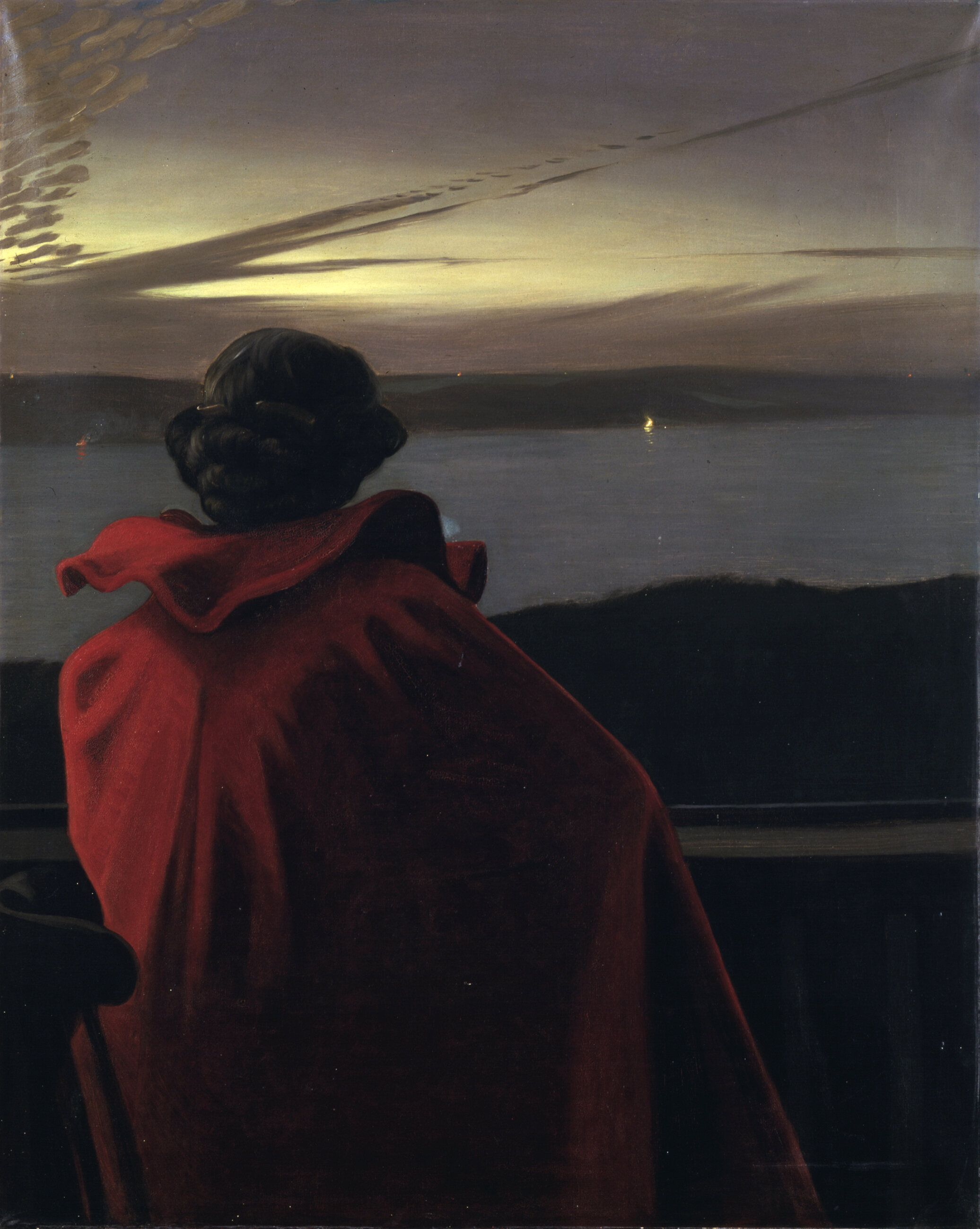
Midsummer Night near Vejle Fjord, 1904
