= Bindesbøll =

Bindesbøll is a surname. Notable people with this surname include:

- Gottlieb Bindesbøll (1800–1856), Danish architect
- Johanne Bindesbøll (1851–1934), Danish textile artist
- Thorvald Bindesbøll (1846–1908), Danish architect and sculptor
