= Anna Sarauw =

Danish artist (1839–1919)

Anna Elisabeth Sarauw née Elberling (1839–1919) was a Danish textile artist who collaborated with Kristiane Konstantin-Hansen and Johanne Bindesbøll in running a successful embroidery business in Copenhagen. She designed sewing patterns, with naturalistic motifs and stylized Egyptian, Indian and Pompeiian figures.

== Biography ==
Born in Frederiknagore (now Serampore) in Danish India, Anna Elisabeth Elberling was the daughter of the Danish government representative Frederik Emil Elberling (1804–80) and Harriet Anna Fjellerup (1821–59). The oldest of nine children, she was brought up in the west of India. She learnt to sew as a child, completing a finely embroidered gown for her mother before she was 10 years old.

The family moved back to Denmark in 1851. She helped to bring up her sisters, teaching them embroidery, especially after her mother's early death in 1859. In 1870, she married the estate administrator Carl Harald Sarauw (1839–1909) with whom she had four children.

As an embroiderer, Sarauw was noted for her light touch and her talent for creating her own designs, some of which she sold commercially. She befriended Constantin Hansen and his daughters Elise and Kristiane. After they opened a needlework shop and studio together with Johanne Bindesbøll, she joined them to create their Kunstbroderiforretningen Konstantin-Hansen, Bindesbøll & Sarauw, commonly known simply as Boden. It is difficult to know which of the embroiderers created the various items but from Sarauw's sketchbooks it can be seen that many of her designs were inspired by her travels abroad. They include stylized figures from Egypt, Pompeii and India. She also created geometrical designs as well as rosettes and lilies.

In 1878, she represented Boden at the Paris World Fair and in 1888 she participated in the Nordic Exhibition in Copenhagen where she received a medal for an embroidered box. In 1881, she left Boden and moved with her husband to Sorø.

Anna Sarauw died in Vissenbjerg Sogn near Assens on 11 September 1919 and is buried in Sorø Cemetery. Her family maintains a large collection of her embroidered textiles, drawings and sewing patterns.
