= Kristian Møhl =

Danish painter

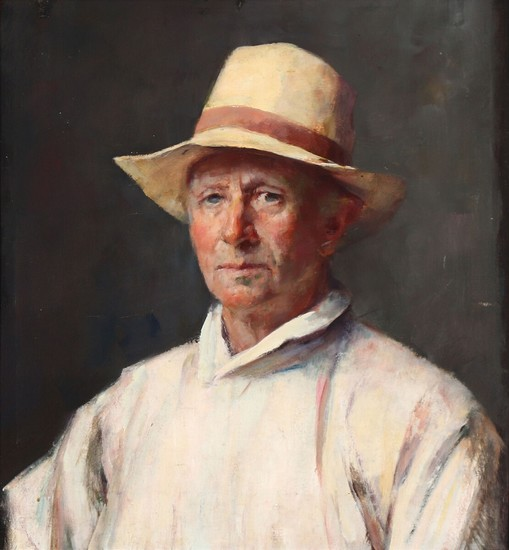
- Portrait of Møhl by Herman Vedel.
- Born: Carl Christian Hansen; 20 February 1876; Ibsker, Denmark
- Died: 7 December 1962 (aged 86); Copenhagen, Denmark
- Education: Kunstnernes Frie Studieskoler
- Known for: Painting, decorative arts
- Awards: Eckersberg Medal

Karl Kristian Møhl(-Hansen) (20 February 1876 – 7 December 1962) was a Danish painter and decorative artist.

== Biography ==
Møhr was born on 20 February 1876 in Ibsker on Bornholm to provost Lauritz Christian Hansen (1822–1907) and Hanne Charlotte Marie Møhl (1831–1905). He changed his last name to Møhl-Hansen on 23 February 1929 and to Møhl 1957. He was the brother of theologian Peter Olaf Ryberg Hansen.

Møhl apprenticed as a building painter and attended technical school before enrolling at the Royal Danish Academy of Fine Arts n April 1895. In June 1896, he dropped out of the academy in protest against the outdated teaching methos. In 1896–1899, he studied at Zartmann's School. He was awarded stipends from the academy in 1895, 10+6 and 1912. In 1911, he received the Raben-Levetzau Grant. In 1914 and 1925, he received the Bernhard Hirschsprungs Grant. Møhr travelled to Italy in 1904, London in 1907, Spain in 1920, Netherlands in 1926 and 1929 and Paris in 1926 and 1937. He had his debut at Charlottenborg Spring Exhibition in 1899 but would later mainly exhibit his work at Den Frie Udstilling where he became a member in 1901. His paintings and decorative arts were also represented at the Baltic Exhibition in Malmö (1914), the exhibition of contemporary Danish art in Liljevalch's Gallery in Stockholm (1919), the international exhibition in Paris in 1925 and in Helsinki in 1928. The Danish Museum of Arts and Caradta (1909), Den frie Udstilling (1923), Kunstforeningen (1928, 1935) and i Kunsthallen (1950) have hosted special exhibitions of his works. In 1920, he was awarded the Eckersberg Medal for one of his paintings. In 1925, he was awarded a gold medal in Paris for some of his textile designs.

On 31 December 1903, he married Gerda Ragnhild Hansen (1878–1972). She was the daughter of Supreme Court attorney and politician Octavius Hansen (1838–1903) and Ida A. Wulff (1845–1924). He died on 7 December 1962 and is buried at Ramløse Cemetery.

== Works ==
In Weilbachs Kunstnerleksikon, Jan Zibrandtsen describes Møhr's style of painting as rooted in traditional Danish landscape painting, such as that of P. C. Skovgaard, with some inspiration from Jean-Baptiste-Camille Corot. His in-depth nature studies, often in watercolour, are generally more interesting than the larger paintings. The latter are represented in the collections of the National Gallery of Denmark, Fuglsang Art Museum and Kunsten in Aalborg.

Møhr was already early in his career active as a decorative artist. In the 1890s, he drew embroidery designs for Johanne Bindesbøll and Kristiane Konstantin-Hansen's embroidery business and later also for Clara Wæver. He also created weaving designs for Mette Vestergaard, ceramics designs for Bing & Grøndahl and silver designs for both Georg Jensen, Birgitte Eriksen and A. Dragsted. Other works included book covers for Gyldendal, wallpapers and textiles. Many of his designs featured plant and animal life. Stylistically, Møhr began in an Art Nouveau-influenced idiom, which in Denmark became known as Skønvirke, and in the 1920s followed the decorative trendsof the time. His works are represented in the Danish Design Museum.

== Memoirs ==
- Zartmann, Kristian: En Erindring (1919)
