= HDMS Thetis (1840) =

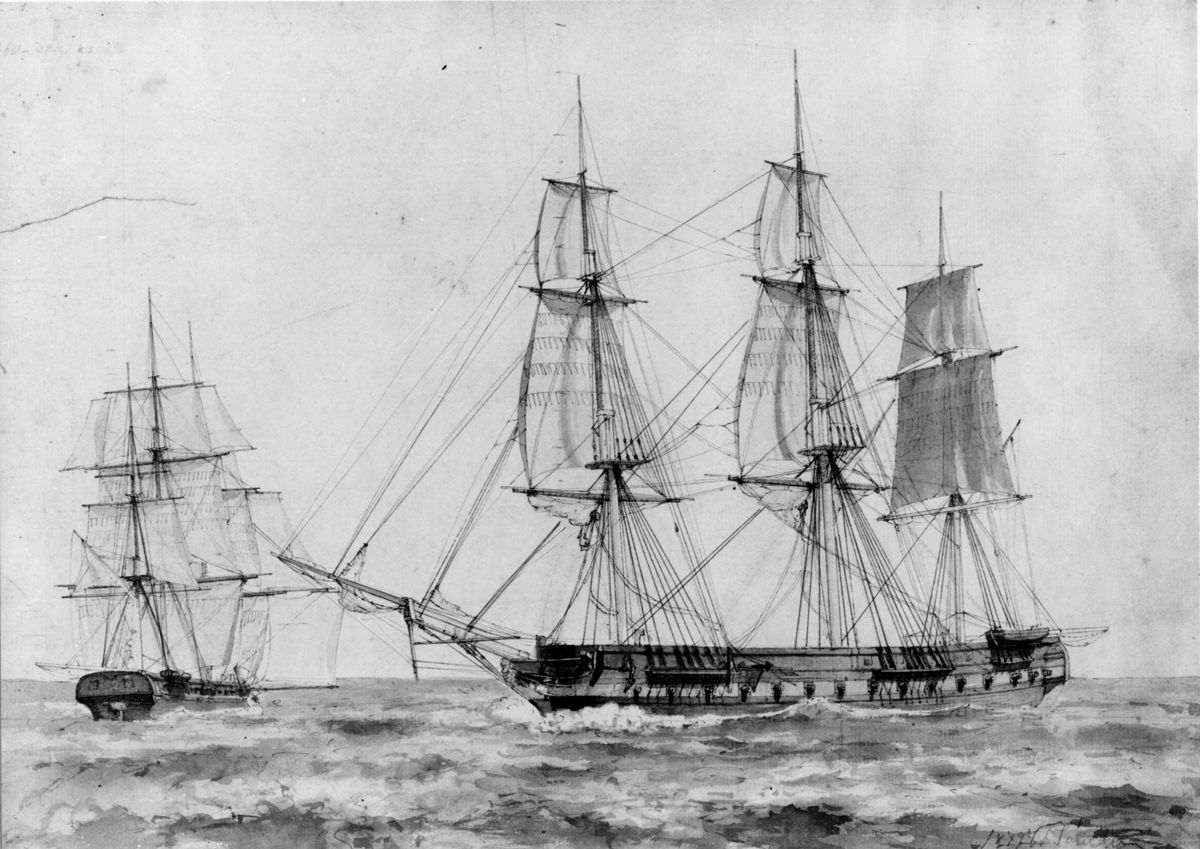
- Thetis in a drawing from 1850.

History

Denmark
- Name: Thetis
- Owner: Royal Danish Navy
- Builder: Royal Danish Naval Dockyard
- Launched: 30 April 1840
- Commissioned: 28 April 1842
- Fate: Sold in auction

General characteristics
- Class & type: Frigate
- Length: 48.73 m
- Beam: 12,08

HDMS Thetis was a frigate of the Royal Danish Navy, which she served from 1842 to 1864. She is best known for being one of the ships that picked up some of the sculptor Bertel Thorvaldsen's artworks and other belongings in Rome, some forty years after another Danish naval vessel by the same name had transported him the other way. In the meantime he had achieved international fame for his Neoclassical sculptures. Thorvaldsen, who had been back in Rome since September 1841, after moving back to Copenhagen in 1838, was also supposed to return with the ship. He did however, miss its departure by one day. The Royal Danish Navy's first music corps played its first performance on board the Thetis in 1857.

== Construction and design ==
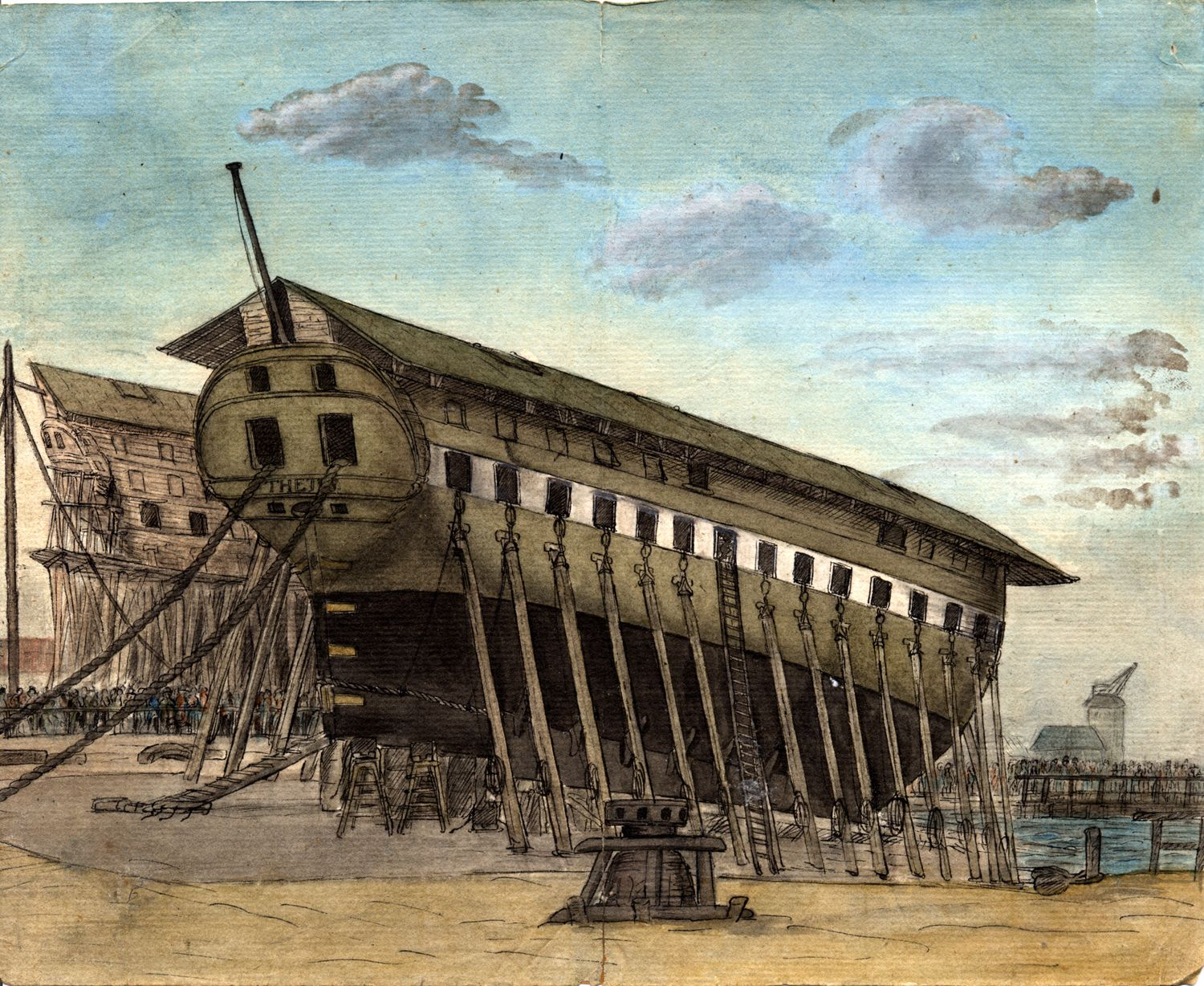
Thetis under construction at Nyholm..

Thetis was built at Nyholm to a design by Andreas Schifter. Diderich Funck was responsible for overseeing the actual construction. She was laid down in 1836 and the construction ended in 1841. She was launched on 30 April 1840.

Thetis was 48.73 metres (159 ft 11 in) long, with a beam of 12.88 metres (42 ft 3 in) and a draught of 5.59 metres (18 ft 4 in).She displaced 713 1/2 læster. Her complement was approximately 400 men and her armament was 48 × 18-pounder guns.

== Missions ==
=== The Mediterranean, 1842 ===
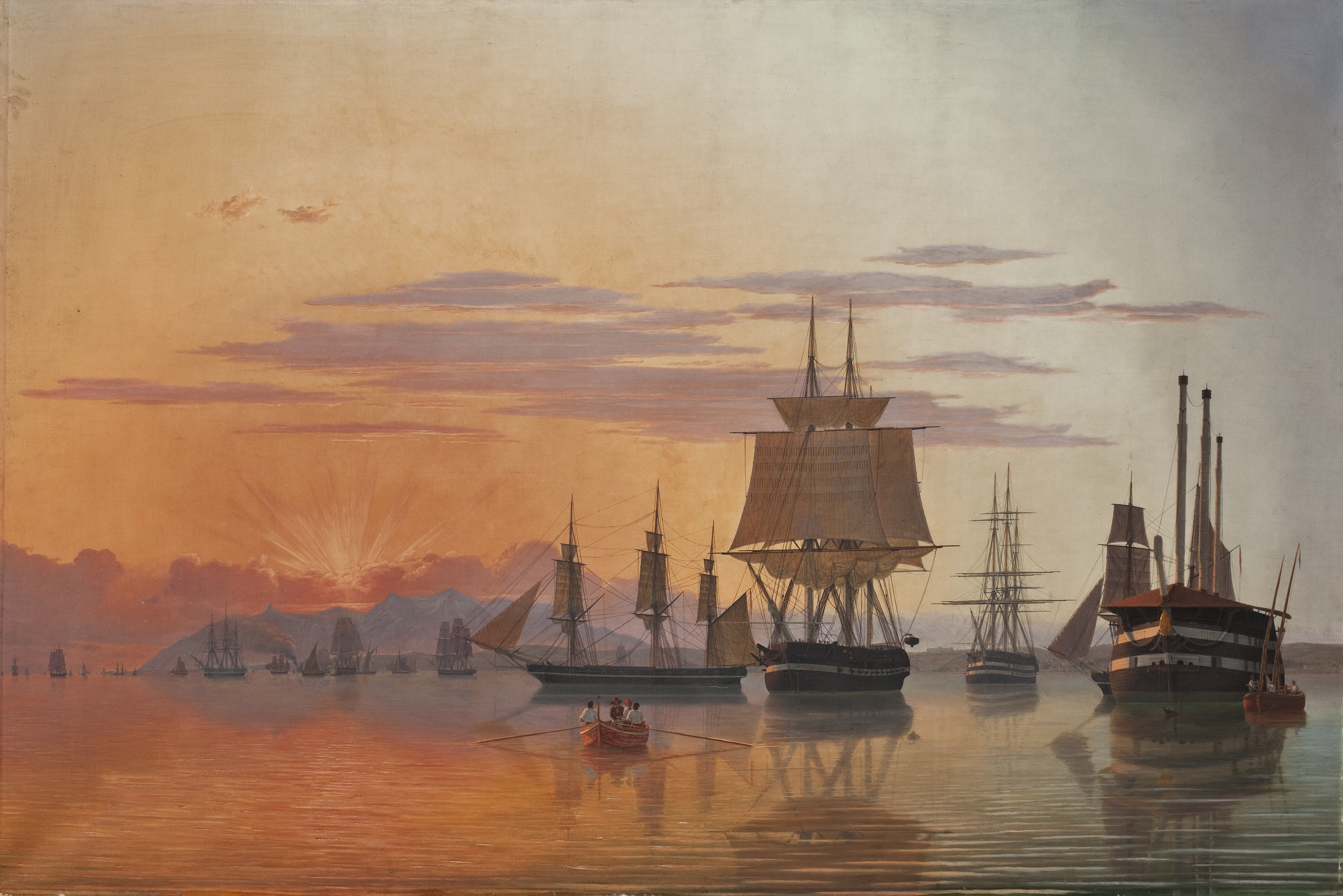
The Frigate Thetis and the Corvette Flora On the River Tagus (1844)

On her maiden voyage, Thetis was sent to the Mediterranean. On her way back. she was tasked with picking up the sculptor Bertel Thorvaldsen and some of his artworks and other belongings in Livorno. Thorvaldsen, who had moved back to Copenhagen in 1838, had returned to Rome in September 1841 to finish some unsettled affairs.

Thetis was under command of Christian Christopher Zahrtmann. Other officers included Carl Irminger (second-in-command), Peder Hersleb Classen Smidth (first lieutenant), Vilhelm Pedersen and Georg Emil Tuxen (first lieutenant). Prince Frederick William of Hesse-Kassel was on board the ship as a passenger. He and his escorting officer, Harald Peter Oxholm, would board the ship in Naples and later return to Denmark over land. The marine artist Frederik Theodor Kloss was, thanks to the patronage of Christian VIII, also admitted to the ship as a passenger.

Thetis departed from Copenhagen on 28 April 1842. She anchored at the Roads of Livorno on 26 September 1842. The stowing of the ship was completed three days later. A total of 120 boxes was transported to Copenhagen on board the ship. The boxes contained some of Thorvaldsen's own sculptures and reliefs as well as his personal collections of copperplate engravings, drawings, coins, caskets, antique vases, jewelry, fragments, paintings and books. Johan Bravo, who had assisted him with the arrangement, escorted his belongings on the voyage.

Thorvaldsen left Rome for the last time on 1 November 1842. On 2 November, he boarded the steam ship Maria Christina in Civitavecchia . It reached Livorno on 3 November, one day after Thetis had left the harbour. He therefore ended up continuing with Maria Christina to Marseille and completing the rest of the journey over land.

Thetis set sails from Livorno on 1 November. She arrived back in Copenhagen on 27 December.

=== The Faroe Islands and the Mediterranean, 1844 ===
In 1844, now under command of captain H. Aschehoug, Thetis was sent back to the Mediterranean for inclusion in the Mediterranean squadron. On the way, Thetis and Gefion (Captain: H.G. Garde) were tasked with transporting Crown Prince Frederick (VII) to the Faroe Islands with a stop in Scotland on the way. This was the first time a Danish royal visited the Faroe Islands.

The two frigates departed from Copenhagen on 6 May. Gefion grounded at Trelleborg on 9 May and therefore had to Copenhagen for repairs. She was not ready to set sail from Copenhagen again until 22 May. The two frigates continued to the Mediterranean after having completed their affairs on the Faroe Islands.. The Mediterranean squadron consisted of Thetis and Gefion as well as the steam ship Hekla and the brig Mercurius. It was supposed to back on J. A. Carstensen in the negotiations with Marocco about the discontinuation of the annual bribes paid by Denmark.

In September, Thetis was sent back to Denmark. Gefion continued to Livorno to pick up the rest of Thorvaldsen's works. Thetis arrived back in Copenhagen on 15 October.

=== First Schleswig War ===
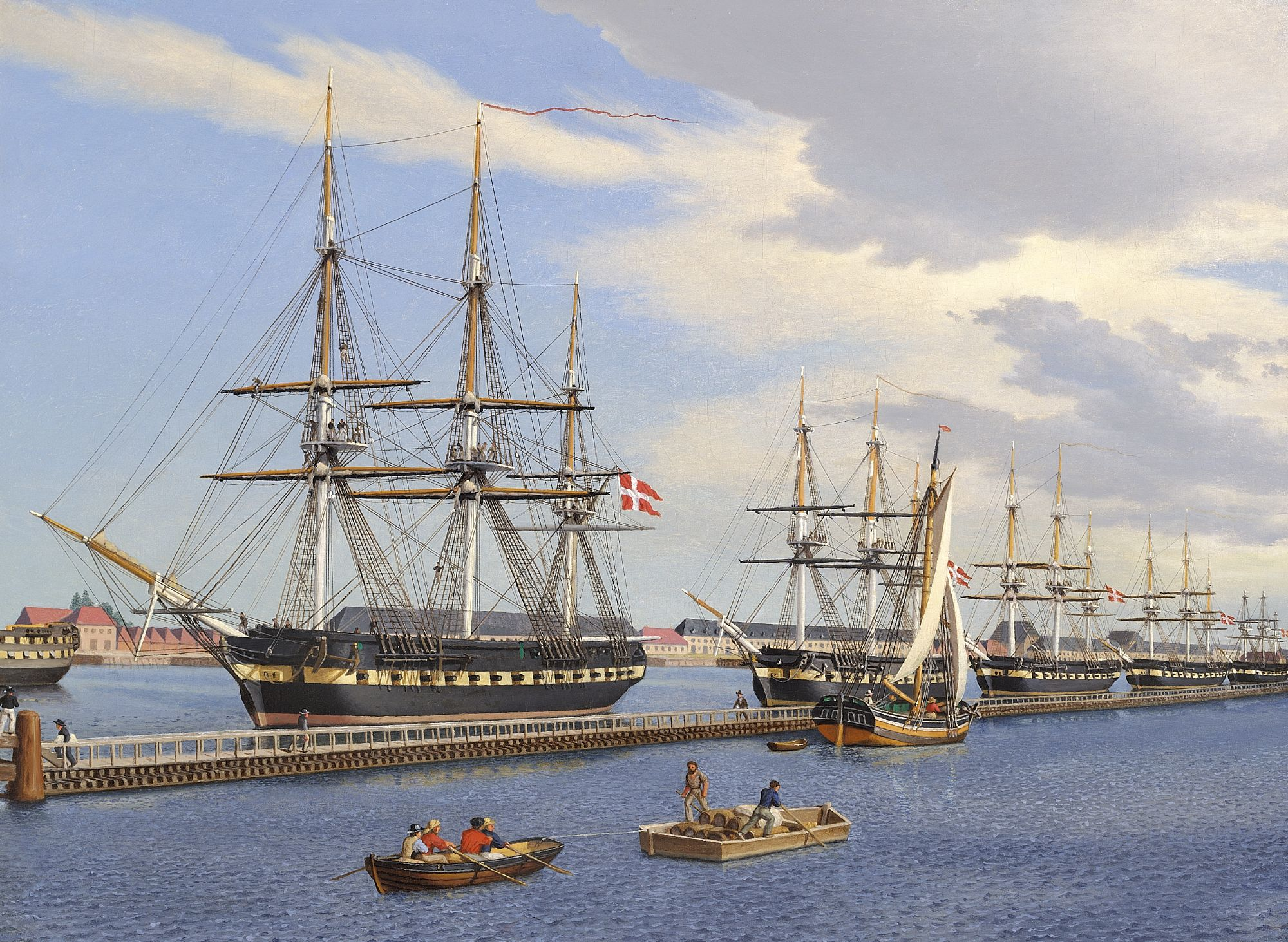
C. W. Eckersberg: Gefion, Thetis, Bellona, Havfruen and Rota. in Copenhagen, 1849.

In 1848–50, Thetis was fitted out for active service in the First Schleswig War. She was under command of first A. C. Polder (13 April 1849 – 21 October 1849), yjrm M. P. Secher (15 March 1849 – 4 September 1849) and then again Kaptajn A. C. Polder (17 March 1850 – 9 January 1851).

=== Naval training ship, 1854–1860 ===
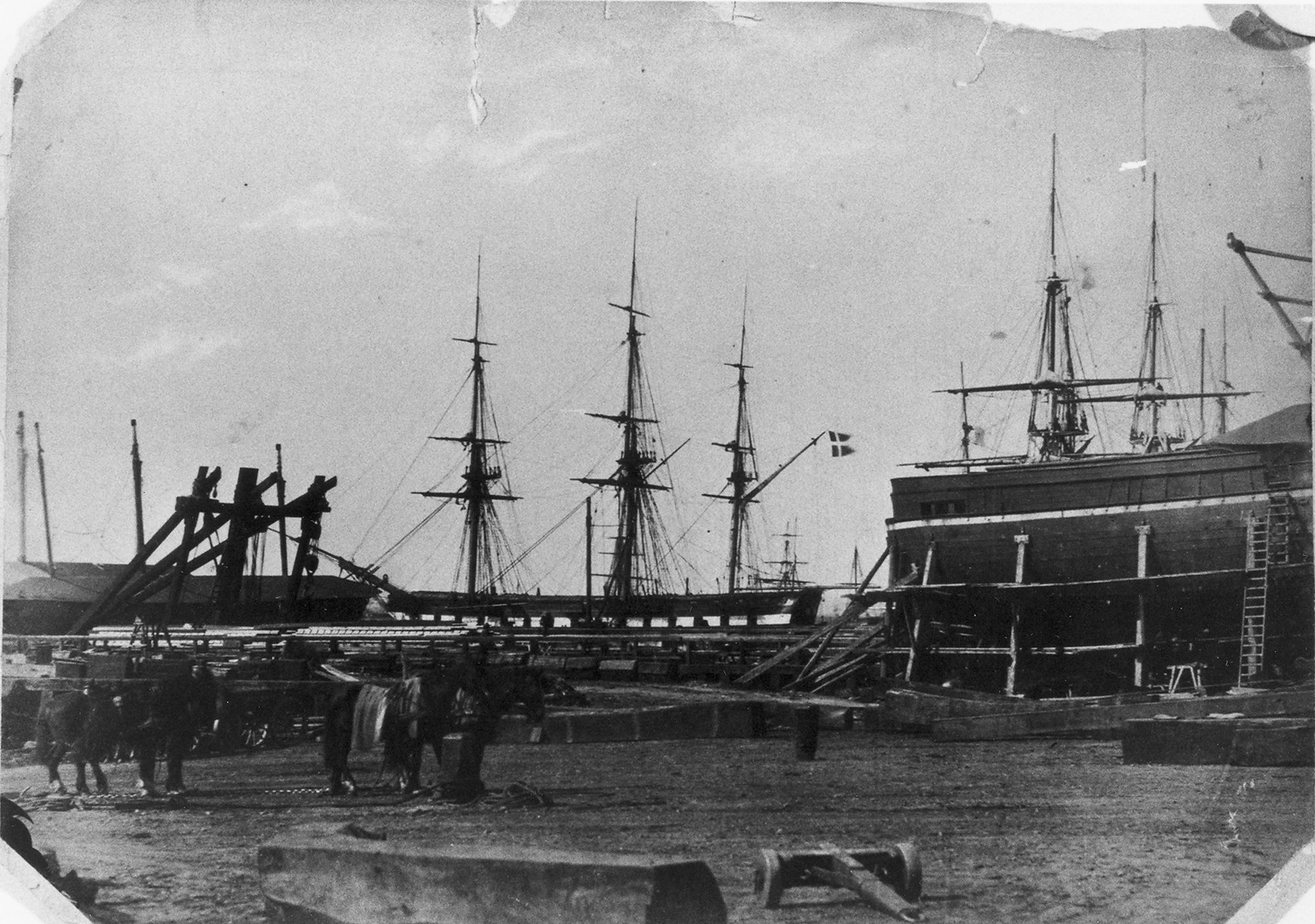
Thetis docked at Holmen in Copenhagen.

In 1854, Thetis was used as a naval training ship. She was under command of captain E. Raffenberg. She departed from Copenhagen on 13 March and arrived back in Copenhagen on 4 September.

In 1857, under the command of Captain Harald Fæster, she was again used as a naval training ship. She departed from Copenhagen on 14 May and arrived back in Copenhagen on 29 August. The Royal Danish Navy's first music corps played its first performance on board Thetis in 1857.

In 1858, under command of Peter Christian Holm, she was again used as a naval training ship. She departed from Copenhagen on 11 June and arrived back in Copenhagen on 11 October. In 1860, under command of P. C. Holm, she was again used as a naval training ship. She departed from Copenhagen on 7 June and arrived back in Copenhagen on 11 October.

=== Second Schleswig War ===
In 1861, in anticipation of an escalation of the conflict with Prussia, Thetis was again fitted out for active military service. She was now under command of Captain C. M. Meinertz.

In 1862, under command of Captain F. L. F. Sommer, she was again used as a naval training ship. She departed from Copenhagen on 11 June and arrived back in Copenhagen on 27 September.

In 1864, still under command of Captain F. L. F. Sommer, she was again fitted out for active military service. She departed from Copenhagen on 5 March and arrived back in Copenhagen on 20 September.

== Fate ==
She was decommissioned on 19 December 1864. She was subsequently broken up.

== Legacy ==
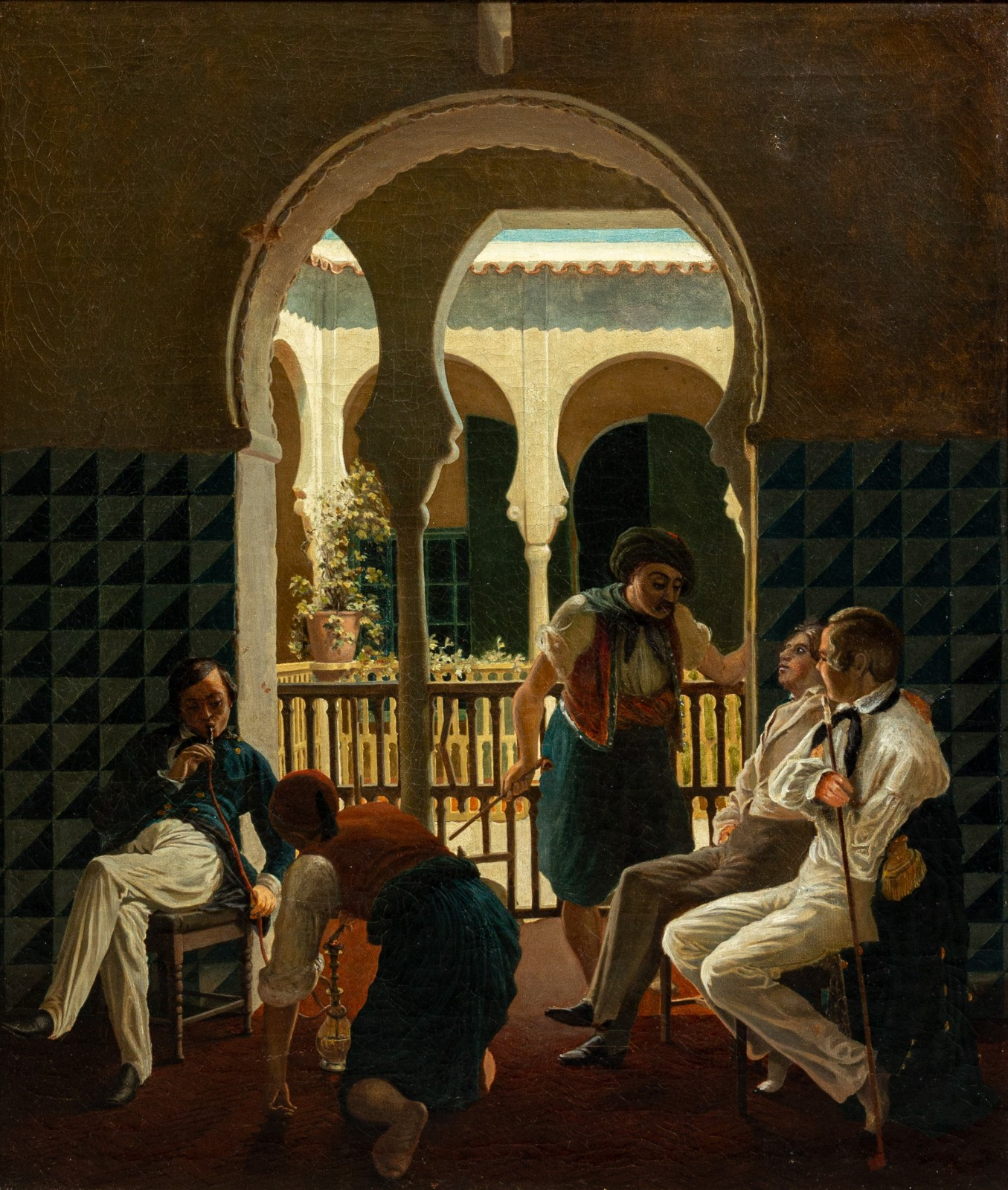
Vilhelm Pedersen: The Artist and Some of His Fellow Officers on Land Leave from the Thesis, 1842

Vilhelm Pedersen created a drawing of all the officers of the 1842 voyage. It is now on display in the Museum of National History at Frederiksborg Castle in Hillerød. He has also created a painting of himself and some of his fellow officers on land leave in what is believed to be Constantinople. The people seen in the picture are himself, F. Theodor Kloss and Harald Peter Oxholm as well as two Turks. The composition was no doubt inspired by that of Constantin Hansen's 1838 group portrait painting A Group of Danish Artists in Rome.

Carl Dahl created a painting of The Frigate Thetis and the Corvette Flora On the River Tagus (1844). Thetis is seen in at least two drawings by Christoffer Wilhelm Eckersberg. One of them shows her under construction at the Rotal Danish Dockyard. The other one, entitled Danish Frigates Fitting Out in the Spring of 1849, shows her with Gefion, Bellona, Havfruen and Rota in Copenhagen.
