= Clara Wæver =

Danish artist (1855–1930)

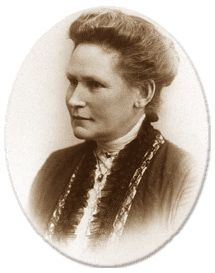
Clara Wæver

Clara Marie Wæver (7 April 1855–18 August 1930) was a Danish embroiderer who in 1890 opened a successful business in Copenhagen. Recognized for its high quality, it also provided instruction and training in needlework for young women. In 1903, Wæver enhanced her wares by acquiring the studio where Kristiane Konstantin-Hansen, a daughter of the painter Constantin Hansen, and Johanne Bindesbøll, a sister of Thorvald Bindesbøll had worked, including all its artworks, models and designs. In 1917, she transferred ownership of the business which then became known as Eva Rosenstand Clara Wæver. It survives today in the centre of Copenhagen as Eva Rosenstand.

== Biography ==
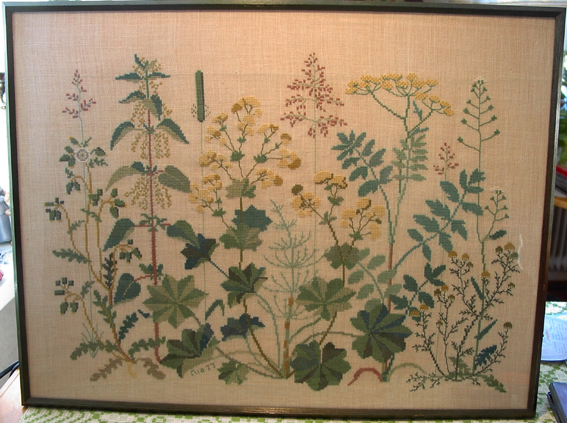
Clara Wæver: Embroidered panel depicting Wayside flowers

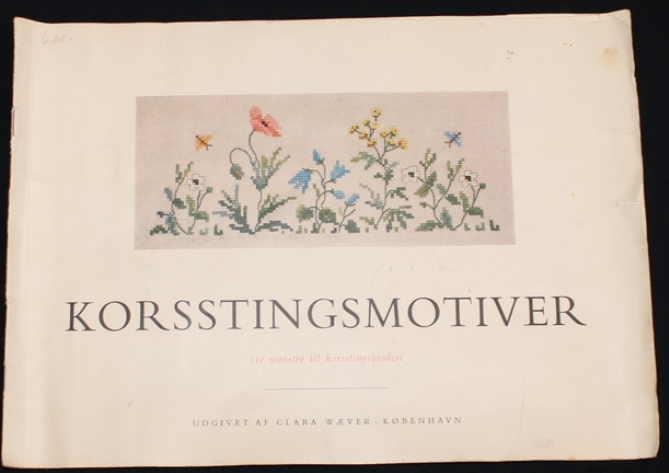
Cross-stitch patterns by Clara Wæver

Born in Stubbekøbing on the island of Falster on 7 April 1855, Clara Wæver was the daughter of Christian Pedersen Wæver (1821–1905), a skipper, and his wife Hanne Elizabeth Fester (1827–1913). The family name stemmed from her great-grandfather who was a weaver. In 1875, her father retired from the sea and moved to Copenhagen with his wife and his two daughters (Clara and Augusta). Clara Wæver took up needlework, taught in a girls school and worked in S.B. Wiegand's embroidery shop.

In 1890, she opened a retail needlework business on Vesterbrogade together with her younger sister who had just qualified as a teacher at N. Zahle's School. The business prospered, attracting customers from both the city and the countryside. By the end of the 19th century, it had gained a reputation for its high quality workmanship, in contrast to most of the other textile businesses in the city which were often associated with shoddy goods. Augusta ran the retail business while Clara became one of the city's few experts who were able to teach young women the art of needlework. At the time, it was important for fine young women to learn how to sew as when they married, they were expected to provide napkins, table cloths, bed linnen, shirts and handkerchiefs, all with embroidered rims and the family initials. Alternatively, the bride's parents could order embroidered articles from the Wævers' shop. As a result, in addition to those working in the shop, they employed a number of women who worked from home.

The Wævers undertook all kinds of needlework but they were particularly adept at cross-stitch work. Many of their patterns were inspired by designs developed by Kristiane Konstantin-Hansen and Johanne Bindesbøll for their own needlework business on the basis of artwork created by the master painters of the Danish Golden Age. When they sold the business in 1903, Clara Wæver bought most of the designs and patterns which became part of her own developments. She also drew on the work of Kristian Møhl, Knud V. Engelhardt and Margrete Drejer. Her business began to supply embroidered goods to churches throughout the country, especially altar cloths and carpets. In 1903, the business moved into new premises, also on Vesterbrogade. In the face of difficulties in obtaining materials during the First World War, in 1917 Clara Wæver sold the business to N.C. Dyrlund.

Wæver died in Hellerup on 18 August 1930 and was buried in Vestre Cemetery.
