= Hanna Hoffmann =

Norwegian-born Danish sculptor, silversmith and weaver

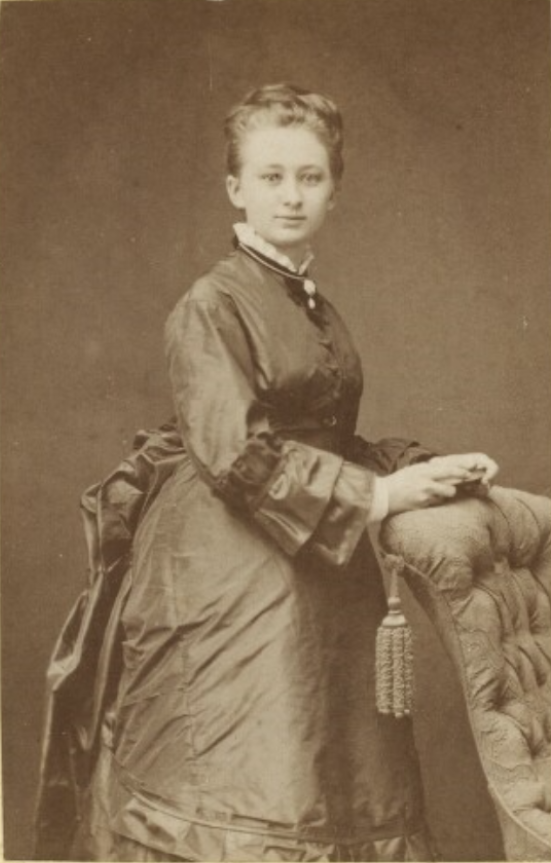
Hanna Hoffmann (1900)

Hanna Gabrielle Hoffmann (1858–1917) was a Norwegian-born Danish sculptor, silversmith and weaver. In 1892, Hoffmann became the first woman in Denmark to graduate as a sculptor after attending the women's department (Kunstakademiets Kunstskole for Kvinder) of the Royal Danish Academy of Fine Arts. After an extended stay in Paris where she worked as a silversmith, she returned to Denmark in 1905 and practised weaving under Kristiane Konstantin-Hansen and Johanne Bindesbøll. In 1913, she established a wool-colouring business in Birkerød.

== Early life and education ==
Born on 9 May 1858 in Molde, Norway, Hanna Gabrielle Hoffmann was the daughter of the Norwegian merchant Gottfred Anthon Hoffmann (1826–1905) and his Danish wife Clara Emilie Constance née Bützow (1824–1917). From the age of six, she was raised in Denmark. After her confirmation, she was trained by the painter Vilhelm Kyhn. From 1885, she attended the Tegne- og Kunstindustriskolen for Kvinder until 1888 when she became one of the first students of sculpture under August Saabye and Theobald Stein in the newly established women's section at the Royal Academy, receiving her diploma in 1892. As a result, she became the first woman to graduate as a sculptor in Denmark.

== Career ==
In 1893, she exhibited a bust at the Charlottenborg Spring Exhibition. After training as a silversmith under Vilhelm Christesen, she took advantage of her travel scholarship and moved to Paris in 1894 where she spent several years working for French companies. She attempted to make a career in London but although she managed to sell some artefacts to the South Kensington Museum, she found her prospects too limited. In France, she hoped in vain to become a metalwork designer, nevertheless associating with the sculptor and metalworker Jean Dampt. She soon realized however that the best she could hope for was to work as a decorator and engraver.

On her return to Denmark in 1905, she trained as a weaver with Konstantin-Hansen and Bindesbøll who had themselves gained experience with the Gobelins Manufactory in Paris. In 1912, she learnt wool colouring in Sweden. The following year, she opened a wool-colouring business in Birkerød, Denmark.

Hanno Hoffmann died in Birkerød on 26 February 1917 and was buried in Copenhagen's Vestre Cemetery.
