= Margrete Drejer =

Danish textile artist

- Born: 13 October 1889
- Died: 15 May 1975 (aged 85); Frederiksberg

Margrete Tora Drejer (13 October 1889 – 15 May 1975) was a Danish painter and textile artist who is remembered for the important part she played in teaching the art and history of sewing and textile decoration to women of all ages. Her own creations include textiles for churches as well as flags and banners.

== Biography ==
Born on 13 October 1889 in Copenhagen, Margrete Tora Drejer was the daughter of the timber merchant Jens Nielsen Drejer (1845–1914) and Marie Hansen (1859–1943). She was brought up in a home on Amager, where both her mother and her grandmother were skilled embroiderers. Her elder sister, Valborg, was trained by Kristiane Konstantin-Hansen and Johanne Bindesbøll. In 1921, she moved with her mother and sister to Brønshøj where she lived for the rest of her life.

From 1904, Drejer spent four years at the Tegne- og Kunstindustriskolen for Kvinder (Women's School for Drawing and Craftmanship) where she learned both painting and embroidery, including goldwork, hedebo and fiber work. After matriculating from highschool, she was admitted to the Royal Danish Academy of Fine Arts in 1910 where she studied painting and decorative art under Joakim Skovgaard, graduating in 1914. She then taught embroidery in Clara Wæver's studio, also undertaking embroidery work on commission, especially flags and banners. From 1921 she taught both embroidery and painting at the Tegne- og Kunstindustriskolen for Kvinder. Together with the architect Gunnar Biilmann Petersen (1897–1968), she headed the school from 1924 to 1929.

Drejer was a major contributor to the three-volume needlework lexicon Berlingske Haandarbejds-Bog in which she naturally covered goldwork and hedebo but also, rather surprisingly, crochet. Together with Johanne Arnbech-Jensen, she also published Sting og Mønstre for Skole og Hjem (Stitches and Patterns for School and Home).

Margrete Drejer died in Frederiksberg on 15 May 1975 and is buried in Sundby Cemetery.
