= Wæver =

Wæver is a surname. Notable people with the surname include:

- Clara Wæver (1855–1930), Danish embroiderer
- Lotte Wæver (born 1942), Danish actress and television presenter
- Ole Wæver (born 1960), American international relations scholar
