= Elise Konstantin-Hansen =

Danish painter and ceramist

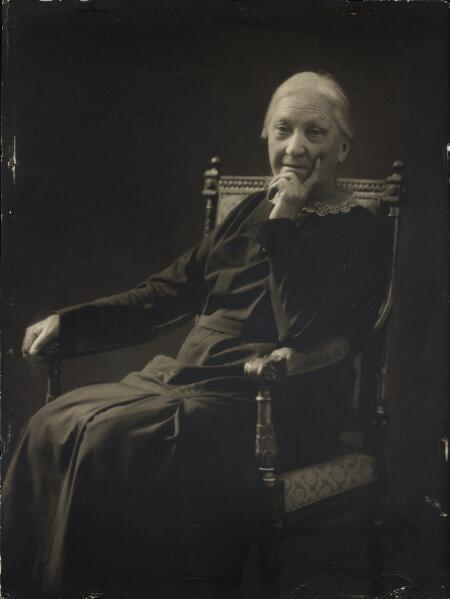
- Elise Konstantin-Hansen, photographed by Sophus Juncker-Jensen
- Born: 4 May 1858; Frederiksberg, Denmark
- Died: 25 February 1946 (aged 87); Ågård, Denmark
- Known for: Painting

Elise Konstantin-Hansen (1858–1946) was a Danish painter and ceramist. She developed her own naturalistic style, often painting sea birds, animals, plants and beach scenes.

== Early life and education ==
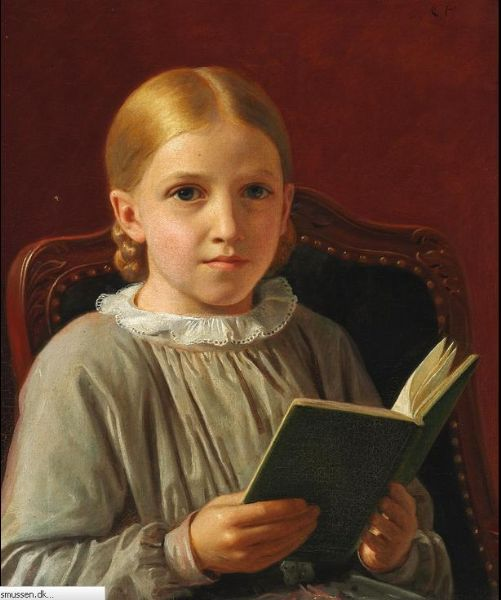
Konstantin-Hansen, painted by her father Constantin Hansen

Konstantin-Hansen was born in the Frederiksberg district of Copenhagen on 4 May 1858. She was the daughter of the Golden Age painter Carl Christian Constantin Hansen and his wife Magdelene Barbara Købke. She changed the spelling of her name to Konstantin-Hansen in 1908.

She grew up in an artistic milieu. Several of her eight siblings were artistically talented, especially her sister Kristiane who became an embroiderer. Konstantin-Hansen herself also began embroidering while young, often developing her own designs. Later, after her father died in 1880, she became Thorvald Bindesbøll's principal assistant.

In addition to being introduced to painting by her father, she attended Vilhelm Kyhn's painting school and was instructed by Christen Dalsgaard and Laurits Tuxen before studying in Paris in 1886.

== Artistic style ==
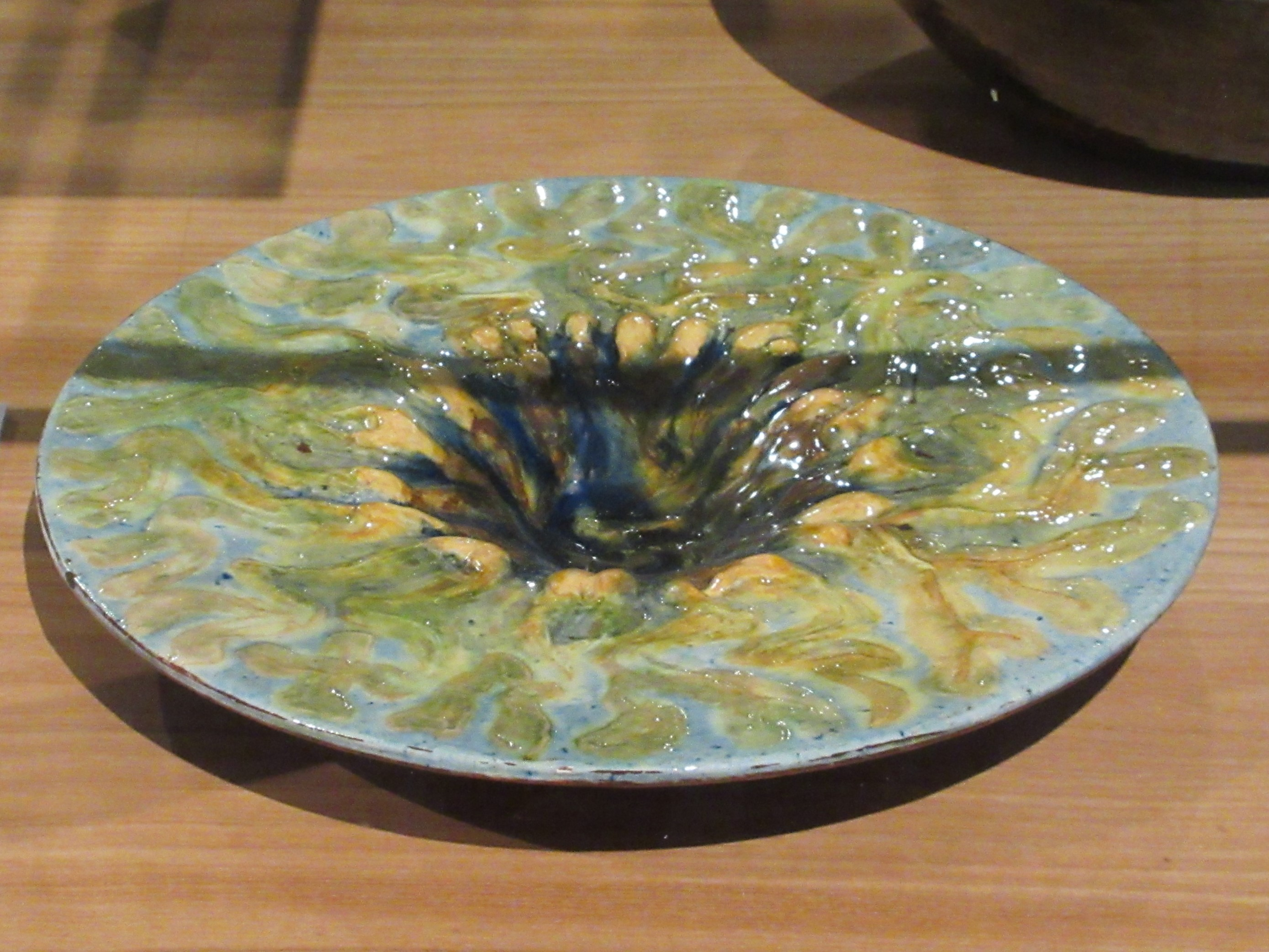
Dish with yellow bladderwrack decoration produced at J. Wallmann's Pottery in Utterslev in 1887. Danish Design Museum, 2018

In the early 1880s, she practised embroidery, adopting the Pompeian approach favoured by Thorvald Bindesbøll. She went on to work with ceramics at the Utterslev workshop with Bindesbøll and the Skovgaard brothers where she developed a freer, more personal style. Significantly influenced by Japanese art, she developed an ornamental approach to the seabirds, animals, plants and beach scenes she frequently painted. Some of her ceramic creations are among her most notable works, especially a plate depicting a starfish, a glazed relief with oyster catchers, and distinctive bowls with vultures.

Konstantin-Hansen painted her last major work in 1930, Svaneflok i våge, depicting a group of swans near Kolding Fjord.

== Exhibitions ==
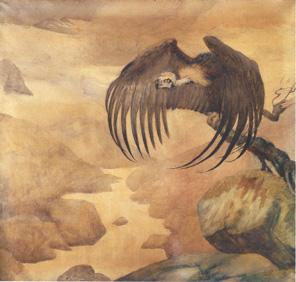
Konstantin-Hansen's painting Volture, which was exhibited at Den Frie Udstilling in 1893

From 1882, Konstantin-Hansen exhibited her paintings at Charlottenborg where in 1885 she won the Neuhausen Prize for her Drenge udenfor en Grønthandel (Boy Outside a Greengrocer's). In 1893, she started instead to exhibit at Den Frie Udstilling where she continued to display her works until 1928. Her works were also exhibited abroad, in Paris (1889), and Berlin (1910–11). Konstantin-Hansen exhibited her work at the Palace of Fine Arts at the 1893 World's Columbian Exposition in Chicago, Illinois. In 1917, she also exhibited at the Danish Art Trade show (Dansk Kunsthandel) and at the 1920 Women's Retrospective Exhibition (Kvindelige kunstneres retrospektive udstilling). More recently, examples of her work were exhibited in 2013 at Kolding Kunstforening.

== Selected paintings ==
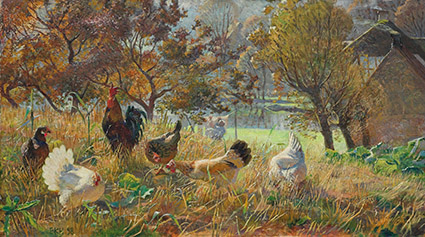
Hønsene på morgenudflugt (1898)

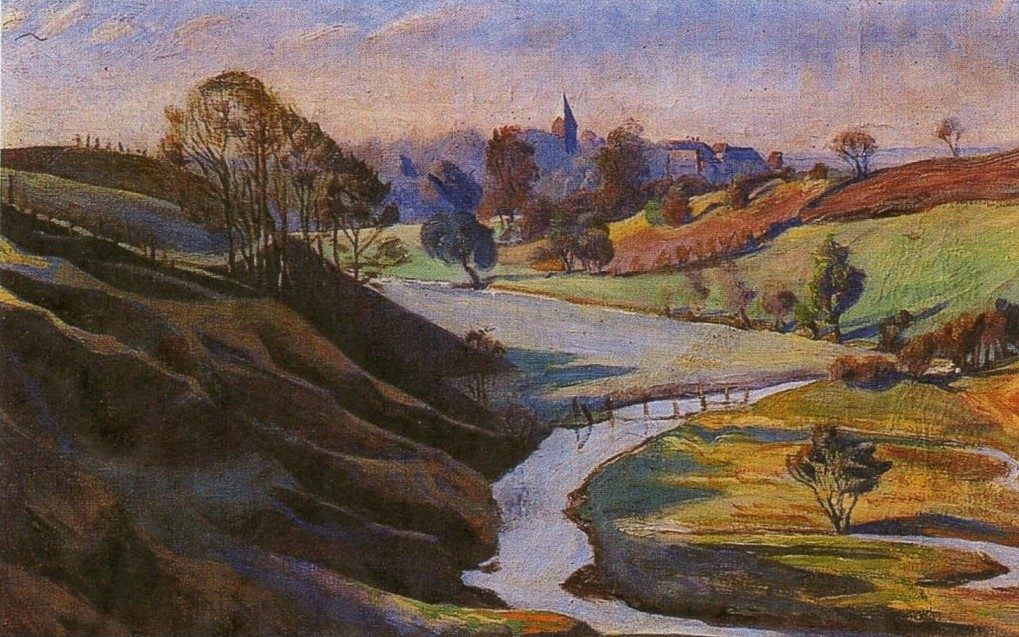
Ågård (ca. 1915)

== Written works ==
- Minder og Oplevelser (1929)
- Små kapitler af et langt liv (1935)
- Samliv med dansk Kunst (1937)
- Erindringsbillede af Constantin Hansen (1936)
