= A Group of Danish Artists in Rome =

1837 painting by Constantin Hansen

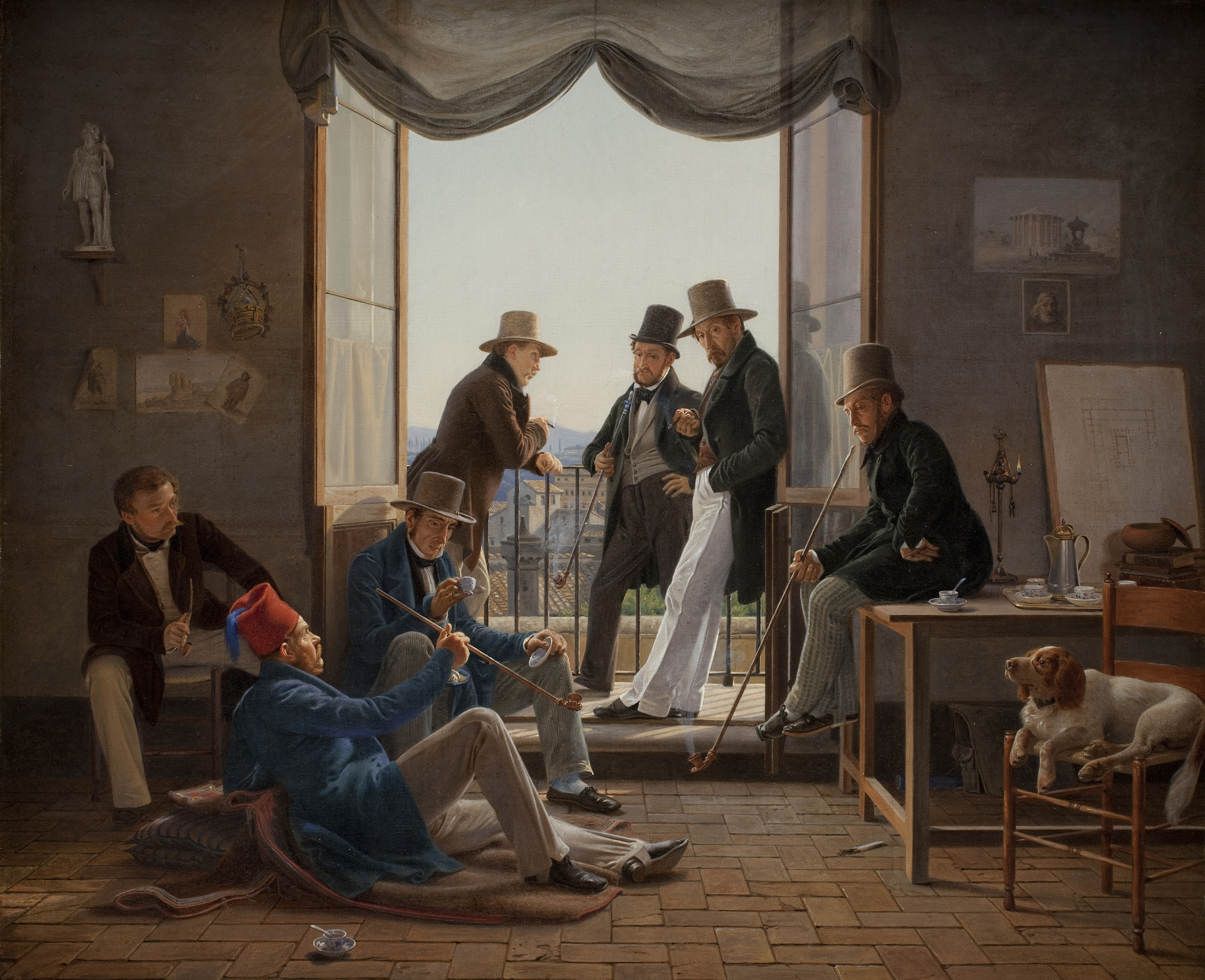
- Artist: Constantin Hansen
- Year: 1837
- Movement: Danish Golden Age
- Subject: Assemblage of Danish painters
- Dimensions: 62 × 74 cm
- Location: National Gallery of Denmark, Copenhagen
- Owner: National Gallery of Denmark

A Group of Danish Artists in Rome is an 1837 oil painting by the Danish Golden Age artist Constantin Hansen. The work depicts a group of Danish painters, architects, and other artists in a Roman hotel room; those painters depicted are Hansen himself, Michael Gottlieb Bindesbøll, Martinus Rørbye, Wilhelm Marstrand, Albert Küchler, Ditlev Blunck, and Jørgen Sonne.
