= Kristiane Konstantin-Hansen =

Danish artist (1848–1925)

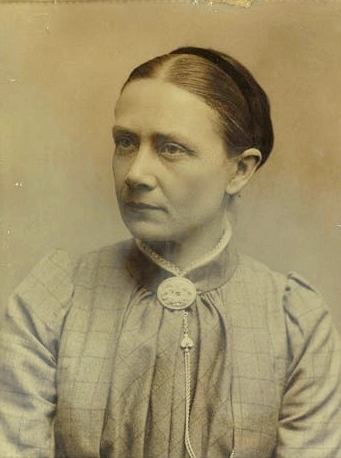
Kristiane Konstantin-Hansen

Kristiane Konstantin-Hansen, also Christiane Constantin Hansen, (16 September 1848 – 13 July 1925) was a Danish weaver, textile artist and retailer who specialized in embroidery. A daughter of the celebrated painter Constantin Hansen, together with the daughter of another Golden Age figure, she opened an embroidery shop in central Copenhagen in 1873. The business proved to be highly successful over the next 30 years, attracting custom from individuals, churches and schools, and receiving several international awards. It closed in 1903 to enable Konstantin-Hansen and her colleague Johanne Bindesbøll to create large tapestries for Frederiksborg Castle. Konstantin-Hansen was also active as a pioneering feminist.

== Biography ==
Born in Copenhagen on 16 September 1848, Christiane Constantin Hansen was the eldest child of the celebrated Danish painter Carl Christian Constantin Hansen (1804–80) and his wife Magdalene Barbara Købke (1825–98). She was brought up with her eight siblings in a home reflecting her father's interest in fine furniture and decorative art. It was Georgia Skovgaard (1828–68), the wife of the painter P.C. Skovgaard, who taught her embroidery but she developed her drawing skills in 1873 as she travelled with her father to Rome, Naples and Pompei, sketching the classical monuments.

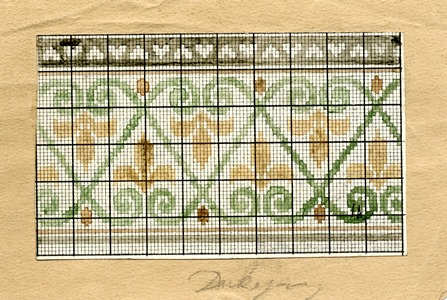
Pattern designed by Konstantin-Hansen and Johanne Bindesbøll

Konstantin-Hansen first practised embroidery at home but in 1873, together with Johanne Bindesbøll, daughter of the architect Thorvald Bindesbøll, she opened a shop on Købmagergade in central Copenhagen. For a number of years, they were joined by the embroiderer Anna Sarauw. Thanks to Konstantin-Hansen's orderly approach and the skills of the artists, the business ran successfully for a full 30 years. Georgia Skovgaard had introduced them to the embroidery of wild flowers, complemented by Johanna Bindesbøll's skilled depictions of flora and fauna in the classical Greek and Roman styles. Many of their patterns were based on the artwork of P.C. Skovgaard, Constantin Hansen, and Thorvald Bindesbøll. They transferred their designs to wool-on-canvas cross-stitching patterns which could be more easily mastered by their customers. The artists themselves, however, produced a variety of textiles decorated with even the most complex embroidery techniques.

The business took part in several international art exhibitions, receiving awards at Amsterdam's Industry Exhibition (1877), the World Exhibition in Paris (1878) and Copenhagen's Nordic Exhibition of 1888.

When it closed in 1903, the embroiderer Clara Wæver acquired most of the designs and patterns, using them to enhance her own work and the goods offered by her embroidery business.

== Feminist pioneer ==
From 1889, Konstantin-Hansen was also an early member of the feminist movement in Denmark, becoming a board member of the Danish Women's Society until 1892 and of the Copenhagen branch until 1897. In addition, she was one of the first three board members of the women's organization Fru Rovsings Mindelegat in 1889. She served on the committee specializing in women's job training. She was particularly interested in encouraging women to stand on their own feet and fought for women's suffrage. Believing it was important for women to dress appropriately for work, in 1890 she proposed setting up facilities for sewing so-called reform clothes which until then had been imported from Germany. She contributed to the selection of Danish exhibitors to the 1893 Chicago World's Fair and served on the committee behind the 1895 Copenhagen Women's Exhibition.

Kristiane Konstantin-Hansen died in Copenhagen on 13 July 1925.
