= Thorvald Bindesbøll =

Danish National romantic architect, sculptor and ornamental artist

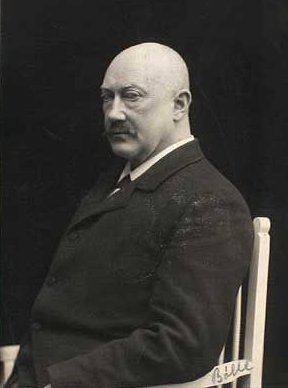
Thorvald Bindesbøll

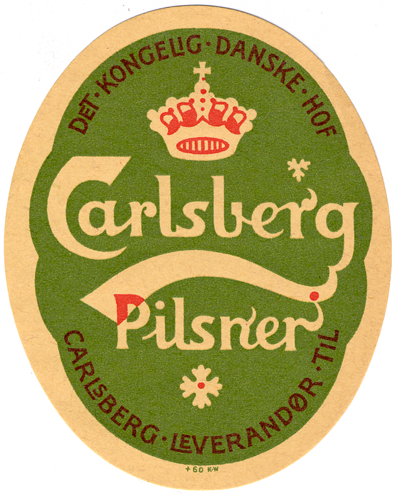
Label for Carlsberg Pilsner, 1904

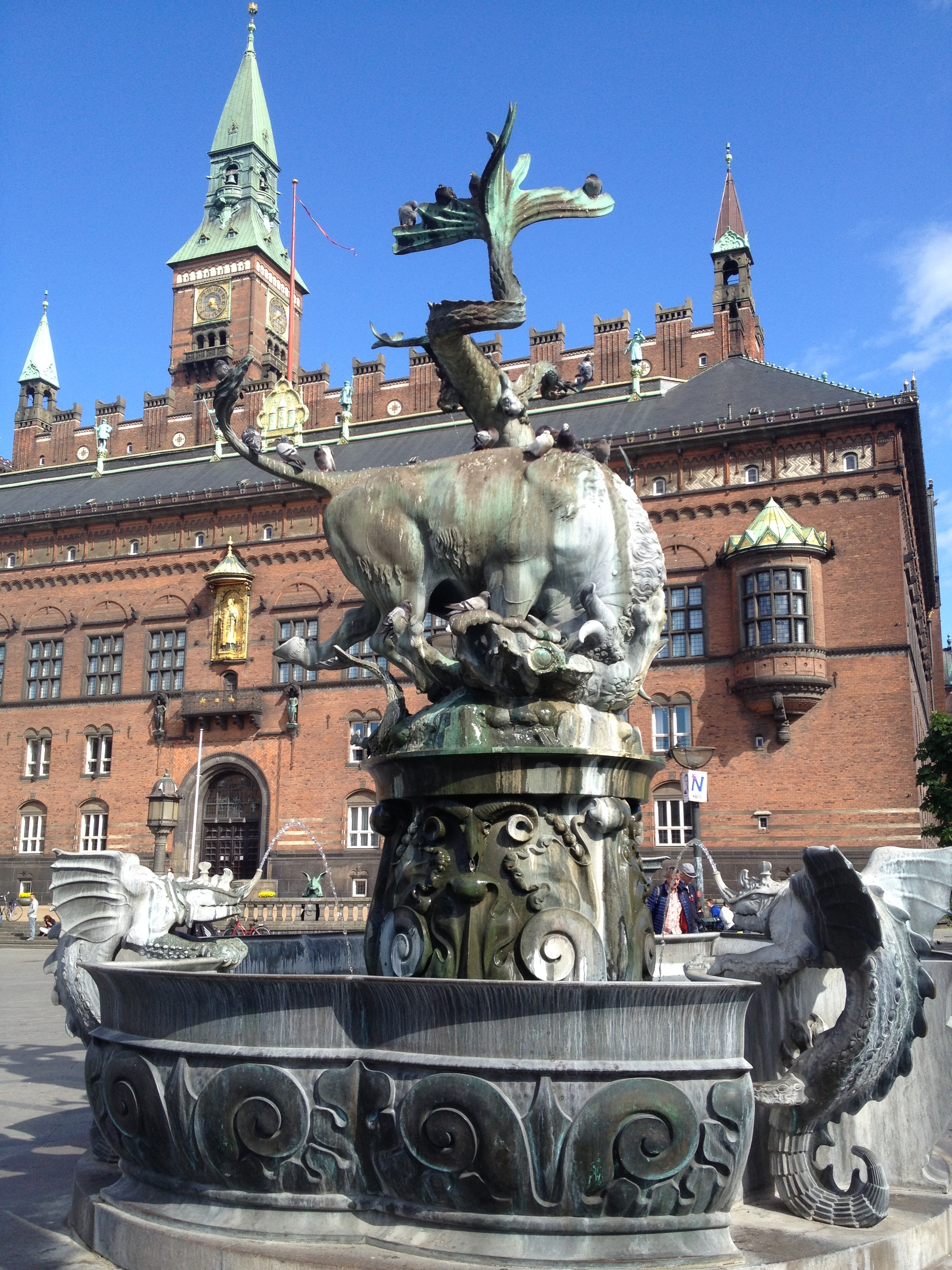
Dragon Fountain, Copenhagen

Thorvald Bindesbøll (21 July 1846 – 27 August 1908) was a Danish National romantic architect, sculptor and ornamental artist. He designed the Dragon Fountain, Copenhagen (Dragespringvandet) and is probably best known as the creator of the Carlsberg beer label, which has remained unchanged since it was introduced.

== Biography ==
Bindesbøll was born in Copenhagen, Denmark. Born into an artistic family; he was the son of architect Michael Gottlieb Bindesbøll (1800–1856) and wife Andrea Frederikke Andersen (1819-1899). His sister Johanne Bindesbøll was a successful textile artist.

He attended the Royal Danish Academy of Fine Arts and left as an architect in 1876. Marginalized as an architect, Bindesbøll turned increasingly towards the art of craftsmanship. As early as 1880, he came into the field of pottery encouraged by the friend and architect Andreas Clemmensen. He began producing ceramics at Frauens Levarefabrik. He worked at Johan Wallmann in Utterslev 1883–90, between 1890 and 1891, he worked with faience at Kähler in Næstved and at G. Eifrig in Valby 1891–1904. By 1904 he was working with Danish gold and silversmith Holger Kyster (1872–1944). Throughout the years Bindesbøll had an intimate collaboration with August Jerndorff and Joakim Skovgaard. He received international notice at the Paris Exposition Universelle (1900) where he won the gold medal for his décor of the Danish exhibition. With A. Michelsen, he designed a number of cutlery piece. Bindesboll had a preference to decorate the entirety of the handle of his pieces in broad scrolling floral patterns, or heavy geometric patterns.

Bindesbøll died at Frederiksberg and was buried at Frederiksberg Ældre Kirkegård.

== See also ==
- List of Danish architects
- Thorvald Bindesbøll Medal
