= Johanne Bindesbøll =

Danish artist (1851–1934)

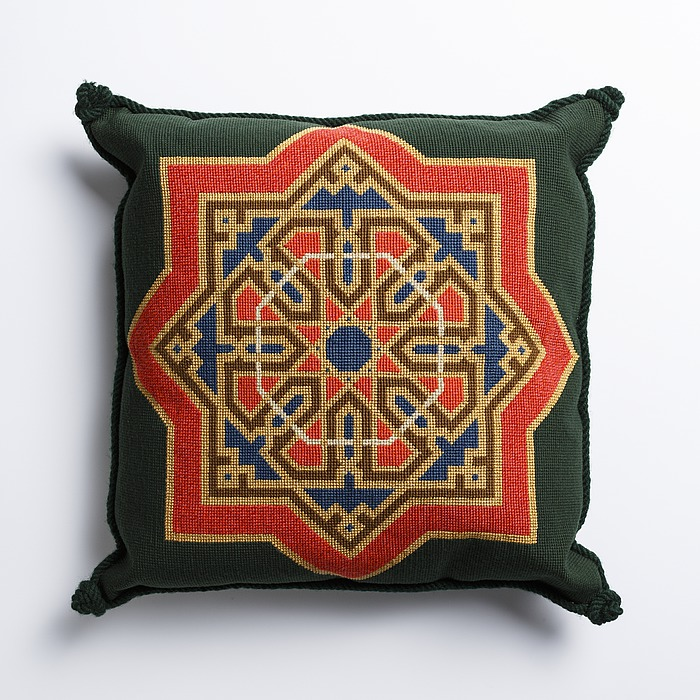
Cushion embroidered by Johanne Bindesbøll based on design by her father M.G. Bindesbøll

Karen Johanne Bindesbøll (5 January 1851 – 9 July 1934) was a Danish textile artist who specialized in embroidery. Together with Kristiane Konstantin-Hansen, from 1873 she ran a retail business in Copenhagen, selling embroidered goods and training young women to sew. The business proved to be highly successful over the next 30 years, attracting custom from individuals, churches and schools, and receiving several international awards. It closed in 1903 to enable Bindesbøll and her colleague Konstantin-Hansen to create large tapestries for Frederiksborg Castle.

== Biography ==
Born on 5 January 1851 in Aarhus, Karen Johanne Bindesbøll was the daughter of the Golden Age architect Michael Gottlieb Birckner Bindesbøll (1800–56) and Andrea Frederikke Andersen (1819–99). She was brought up in an architectural environment in which decorative art and textiles played an important part. She was taught drawing and embroidery at home, frequently with the help of the artistic women who came to visit. After her father's early death, it became necessary for Johanne and her elder sister Maria (1849–1915) to develop their sewing skills as a means of earning an income. Her younger brother, Thorvald (1846–1908), who became a designer and an architect, often prepared their designs and patterns. The family continued to enjoy close contacts with the cultural families of the day, especially those who befriended the painter P.C. Skovgaard.

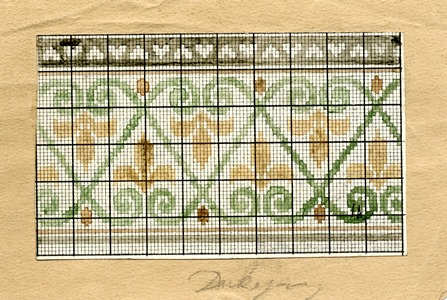
Pattern designed by Johanne Bindesbøll and Konstantin-Hansen

Together with Konstantin-Hansen, in 1873 she opened a business on Købmagergade in central Copenhagen. They were later joined by Anna Sarauw and by Johanne's sister, Marie. The shop thrived on its good selection of patterns and materials, complemented by the expertise of the women who ran it. Bindesbøll was recognized for the efficient way she dealt with difficult customers. She was also a strong supporter of Danish embroidery traditions in comparison with those from Germany. Many of their patterns were based on the artwork of P.C. Skovgaard, Constantin Hansen, and Thorvald Bindesbøll.

In 1900, Bindesbøll and Konstantin-Hansen were commissioned to recreate the tapestries from Frederiksborg Castle which had been destroyed in the 1859 fire. After carrying out substantial research, they embarked on the task in 1903. After Konstantin-Hansen died in 1925, Bindesbøll completed the work in 1928.

Johanne Bindesbøll died on 9 July 1934 in Copenhagen and is buried in Frederiksberg Ældre Kirkegård.
