= Constantin Hansen =

Danish artist (1804–1880)

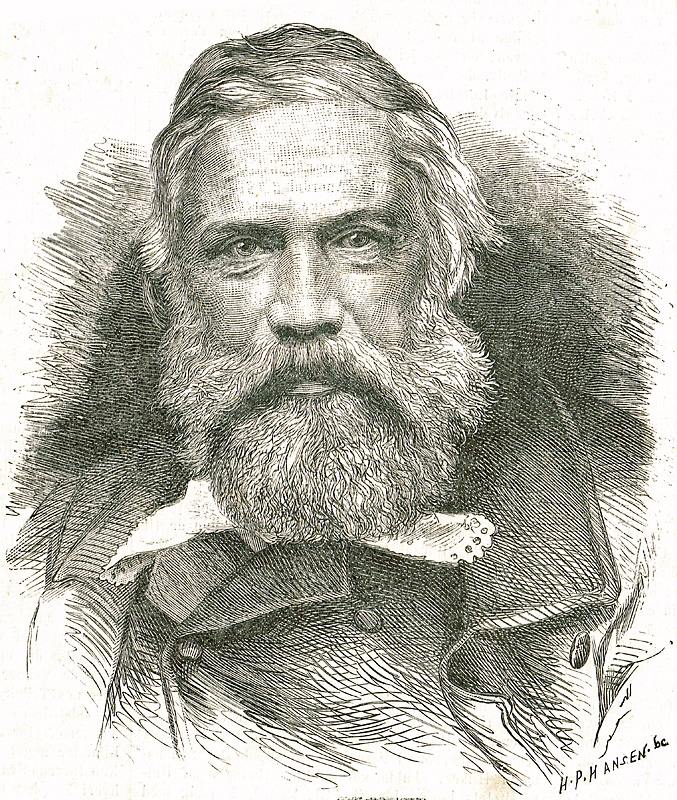
- Constantin Hansen; Illustreret Tidende, 4. april 1880
- Born: 3 November 1804; Rome, Papal States
- Died: 29 March 1880 (aged 75); Copenhagen, Denmark
- Education: Royal Danish Academy of Fine Arts
- Known for: Painting
- Notable work: A Group of Danish Artists in Rome (1837); The Danish Constituent Assembly (1861-1865)
- Movement: Danish Golden Age, Romanticism

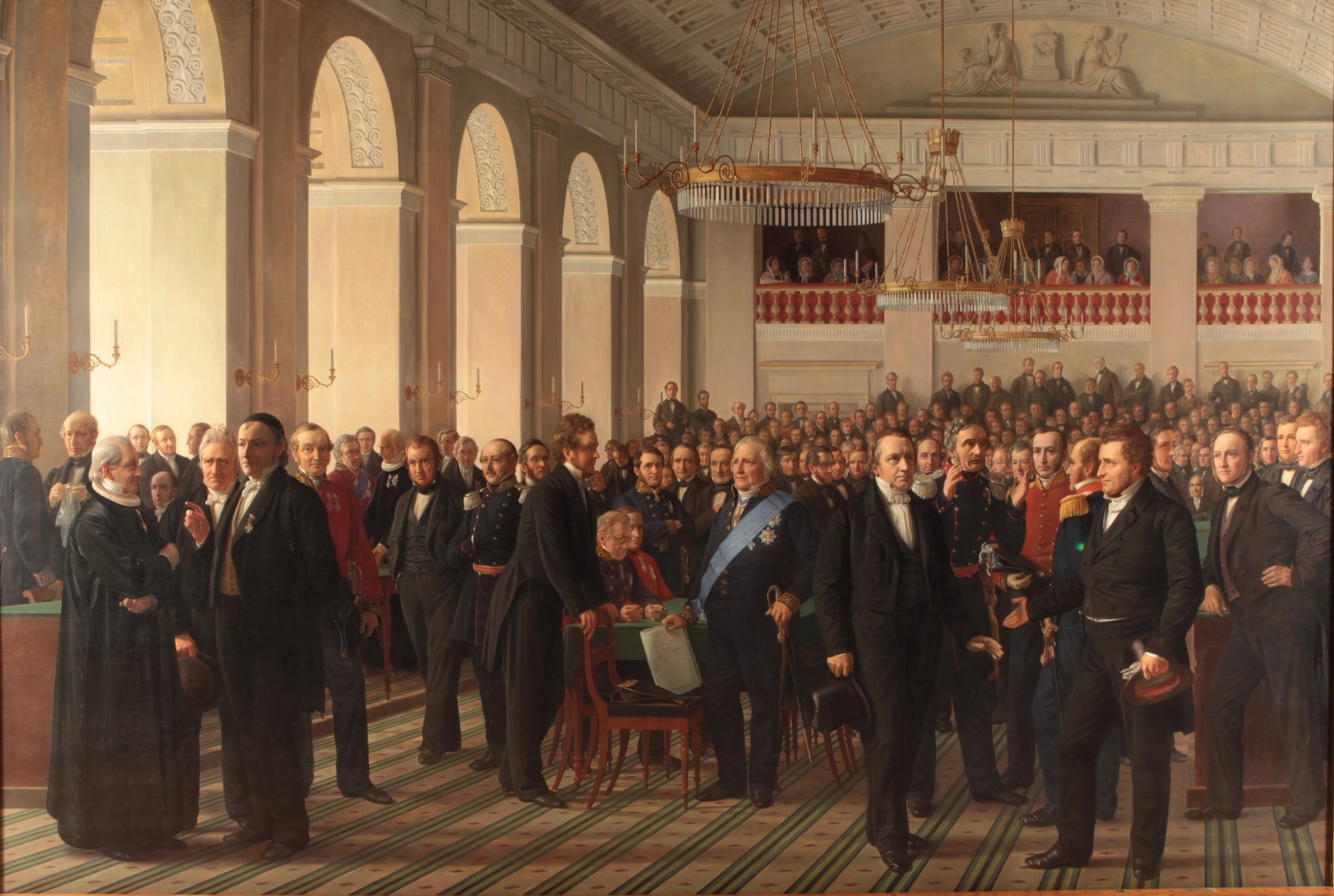
The Danish Constituent Assembly (1861-1865)

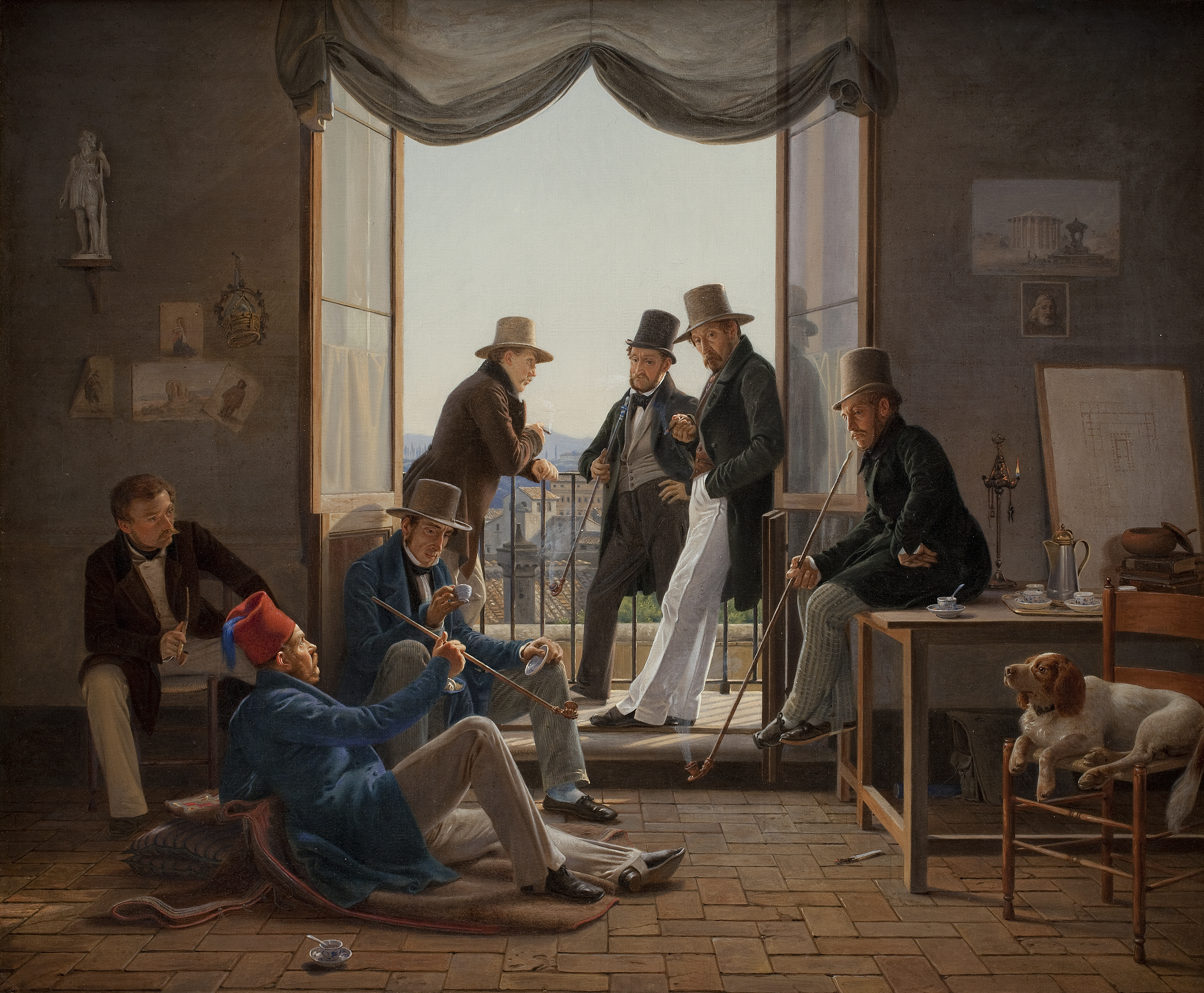
A Group of Danish Artists in Rome (1837)

Carl Christian Constantin Hansen (Constantin Hansen) (3 November 1804 – 29 March 1880) was one of the painters associated with the Golden Age of Danish Painting. He was deeply interested in literature and mythology, and inspired by art historian Niels Laurits Høyen, he tried to recreate a national historical painting based on Norse mythology. He painted also many altarpieces and portraits, including the monumental oil painting The Danish Constituent Assembly (Den grundlovgivende Rigsforsamling) between 1861 and 1865.

== Early life ==
He was born in Rome, the son of portrait painter Hans Hansen. The family soon relocated to Vienna, where Constanze Mozart, the widow of Wolfgang Amadeus Mozart, became godmother at his christening and he was named after her. Within his first year, the family moved to Copenhagen, where he was raised.

== Education ==
He entered the architecture school of the Royal Danish Academy of Art (Det Kongelige Danske Kunstakademi) at 12 years of age, but changed his course of study to painting at the age of 21. He began his training under Christoffer Wilhelm Eckersberg in 1828. He lost both his parents at about this time to typhus, and became the sole supporter of his younger sisters. He took over several commissions that had belonged to his father, including some copies to the Portrait Collection at Frederiksborg Palace and decorative paintings to Christiansborg Palace.

== Foreign study ==
In 1835 he received a two-year stipend to travel abroad, which was followed up by an additional year's stipend. His travels took him through Berlin, Dresden, Prague, Nuremberg and Munich on his way to Italy, where he travelled extensively and stayed longer periods in Rome, Naples and Pompeii. In Italy he met fellow Dane, the sculptor Bertel Thorvaldsen. He travelled with other Danish artists, including Jørgen Roed, Christen Købke and decorative painter Georg Hilker (1807–1875).

The Copenhagen Art Union (Kunstforening) commissioned a painting from Hansen in 1837. He provided them with A Group of Danish Artists in Rome, (Et Selskab af danske Kunstnere i Rom). In addition he painted Italian folk scenes, and studies of Roman antiquities and architecture that reflect Eckersberg's spirit.

After eight years in Italy he finally returned to Denmark, staying briefly in Munich, where he studied the technique of fresco painting, in anticipation of a commission, along with Georg Hilker, to decorate the University of Copenhagen's vestibule on Frue Plads. This work continued from 1844 until 1853. Hansen painted the mythological figures, while Hilker painted the decorations and frameworks.

== Marriage ==
He married Magdalene Barbara Købke in 1846, and they had thirteen children. However, four children died within one year after being born and one of their sons, Hans Christian, was killed at the age of nineteen, when he fell overboard from the mast of the sailing ship on which he was a sailor.

In 1854 he was named professor at the Academy, but first became member of the Academy in 1864. One of his daughters, Elise Konstantin-Hansen, (1858–1946) became a recognized painter, and another Kristiane Konstantin-Hansen (1848–1925), became a tapestry weaver.

The Interior of St Bendt's Church at Ringsted (1829), National Gallery of Denmark, Copenhagen

The Piazza by San Pietro in Vincoli, Rome (1836), Nationalmuseum, Stockholm

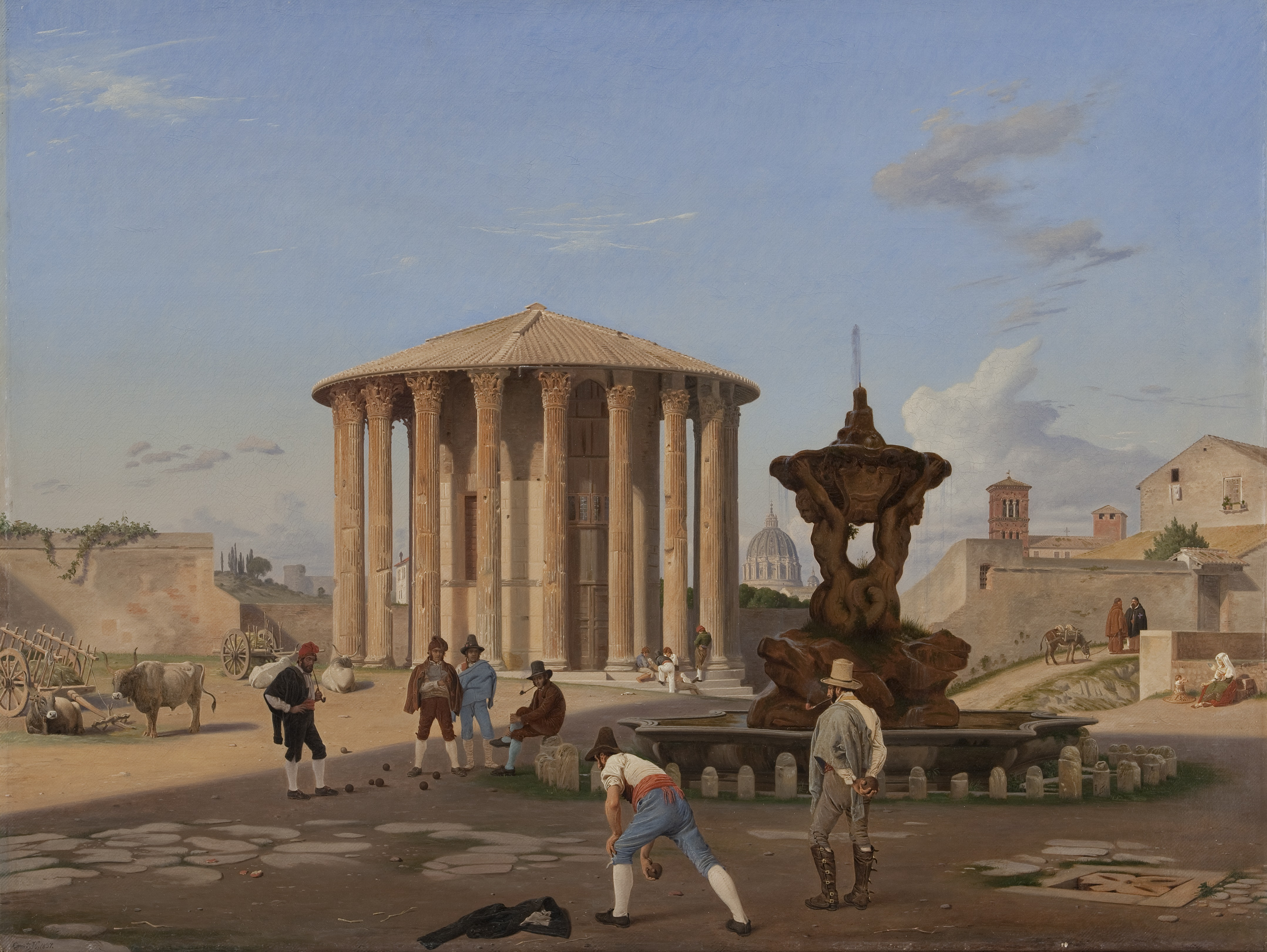
Piazza della Bocca della Verità with the so-called Vesta Temple in Rome (1837), National Gallery of Denmark, Copenhagen

The Temple of Athena in Paestum (1838), National Gallery of Denmark, Copenhagen

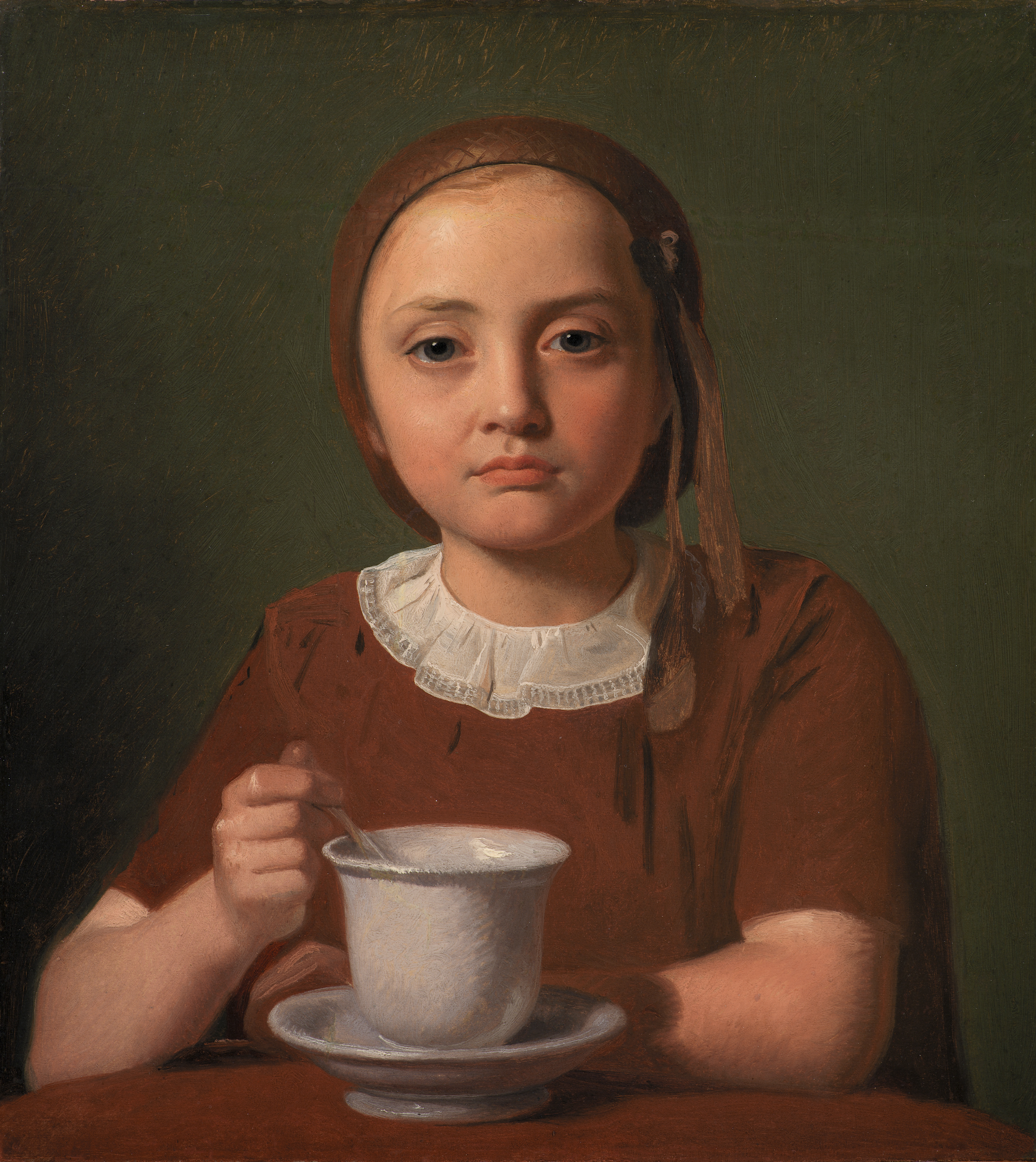
Portrait of a Little Girl, Elise Købke, with a Cup in front of her (1850), National Gallery of Denmark, Copenhagen

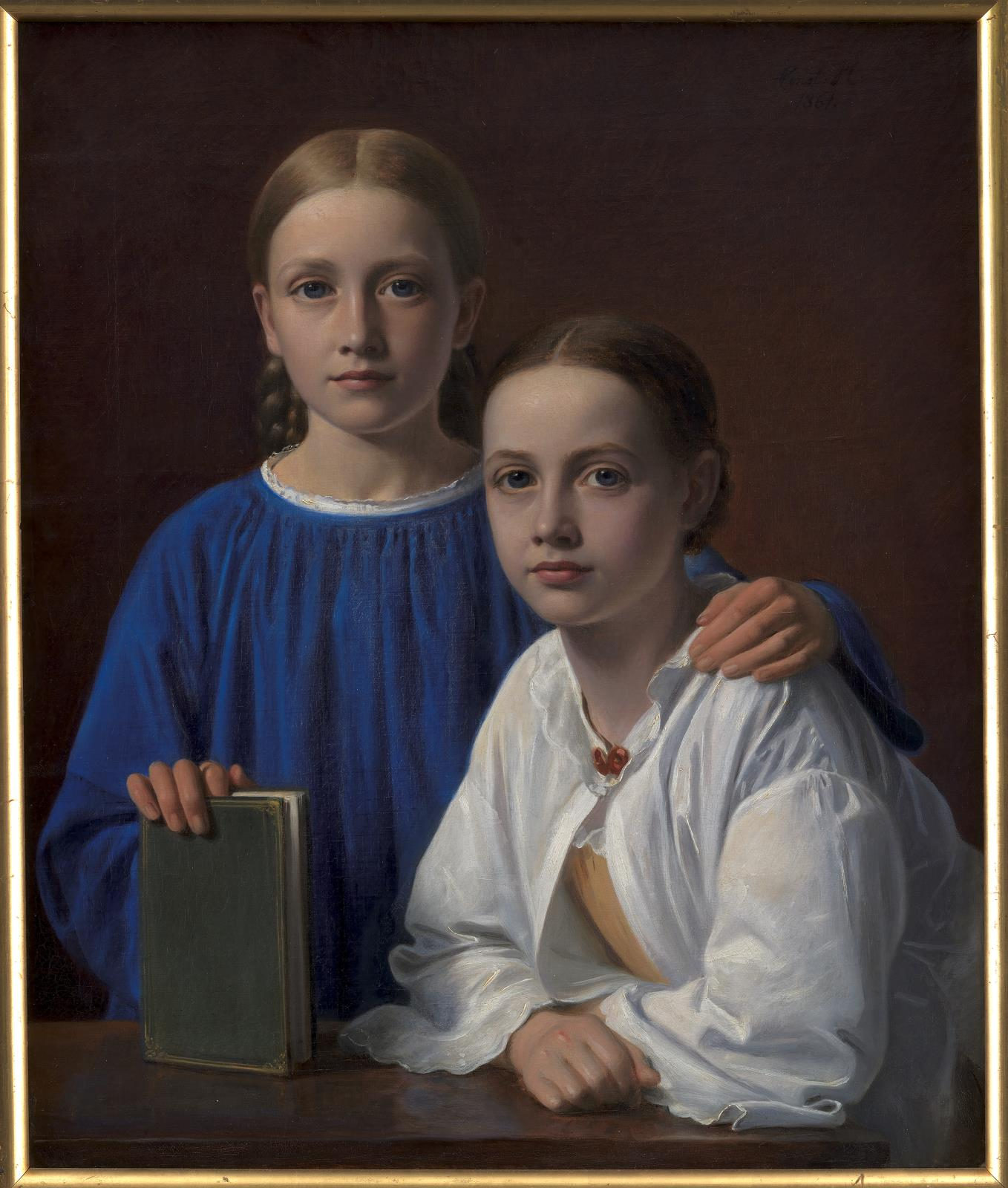
Meta Magdalene Hammerich and the Artist's Daughter Kristiane Konstantin Hansen (1861), National Gallery of Denmark, Copenhagen

== See also ==
- List of Danish painters

== Other sources ==
- KID Kunst Index Danmark ("Art Index Denmark")
- Danish Biographical Encyclopedia ("Dansk biografisk Leksikion")
- Images of the Old Norse Gods
- Wikimedia Commons
- Monrad, Kasper (1993). The Golden Age of Danish Painting. New York: Hudson Hills Press.
